= Lou Bastien =

American professional wrestler (1916–1979)

- Bastien, c. 1950s–1960s

Personal information
- Born: Louis John Klein; July 10, 1916 Detroit, Michigan, U.S.
- Died: October 11, 1979 (aged 63) Detroit, Michigan, U.S.
- Children: 1

Professional wrestling career
- Ring name(s): Lou Bastien; Lou Klein; The Green Hornet
- Billed from: Detroit, Michigan
- Debut: 1941
- Retired: 1977

Louis John Klein (July 10, 1916 – October 11, 1979), better known by his ring name Lou Bastien, was an American professional wrestler. He had major success in NWA-Detroit, the American Wrestling Association, and Capital Wrestling Corporation, where in the latter promotion, he was 3-Time WWWF United States Tag Team Champions with his kayfabe brother Red Bastien.

== Professional career ==
Lou Klein was born in Detroit, Michigan, in 1916. Growing up, Klein was an amateur wrestler who in the 1930s with hoped to qualify for the Olympics. When World War II broke out, in order to support his wife and child, he turned professional in 1942. In his early days he extensively wrestled in the Midwest region as a junior-heavyweight. There he primarily competed in the Midwest Wrestling Association. He defeated Johney Demchuk to win the MWA World Junior Heavyweight Title in 1948. He won the title again in 1953 defeating Ed Francis. He was dubbed as the "Atomic blonde from Detroit". His first big break came in 1960 when he debuted in the north-east region of Capital Wrestling Corporation (the precursor of the WWWF/WWF/WWE). There he was teamed up with Red Bastien as the Bastien brothers. They won the WWWF United States Tag Team Championship from the reigning champions Jerry and Eddie Graham (The Grahams) on a house at New Haven, Connecticut on April 2, 1960. Lou and Red dropped The Fabulous Kangaroos on July 21 at a house show. They won the titles a final time on August 8 eventually losing it back to the Kangaroos. After this he and Red went to the Indianapolis region where they became 2-time American Wrestling Alliance Indiana World Tagteam Champions. Lou also had success in Big-time Wrestling(Detroit) where he was also a 3-time NWA World Tag team champion. He retired from in-ring competition in 1977 after a career spanning nearly 4 decades. During his later days he helped in training many wrestlers like Art Neilson, Count Drummer, Jim Lancaster, Malcolm Monroe Sr., Rujet Woods, Sandy Parker and Tanya West. Lou Klein's Gym, called "The Doorway to Wrestling", produced many future wrestling stars. He died in 1979 from a heart attack.

== Championships and accomplishments ==
- American Wrestling Alliance
  - AWA Indiana World Tag Team Championship (2 times) - with Red Bastien
- Big Time Wrestling
  - NWA World Tag Team Championship (Detroit version) (3 times) – with Roy Klein (2), and Ed George (1)
- Capitol Wrestling Corporation
  - NWA United States Tag Team Championship (Northeast version) (3 times) - with Red Bastien
- Midwest Wrestling Association (Ohio)
  - MWA World Junior Heavyweight Title (2 time)
