= Luke Graham (wrestler) =

American wrestler (1940–2006)

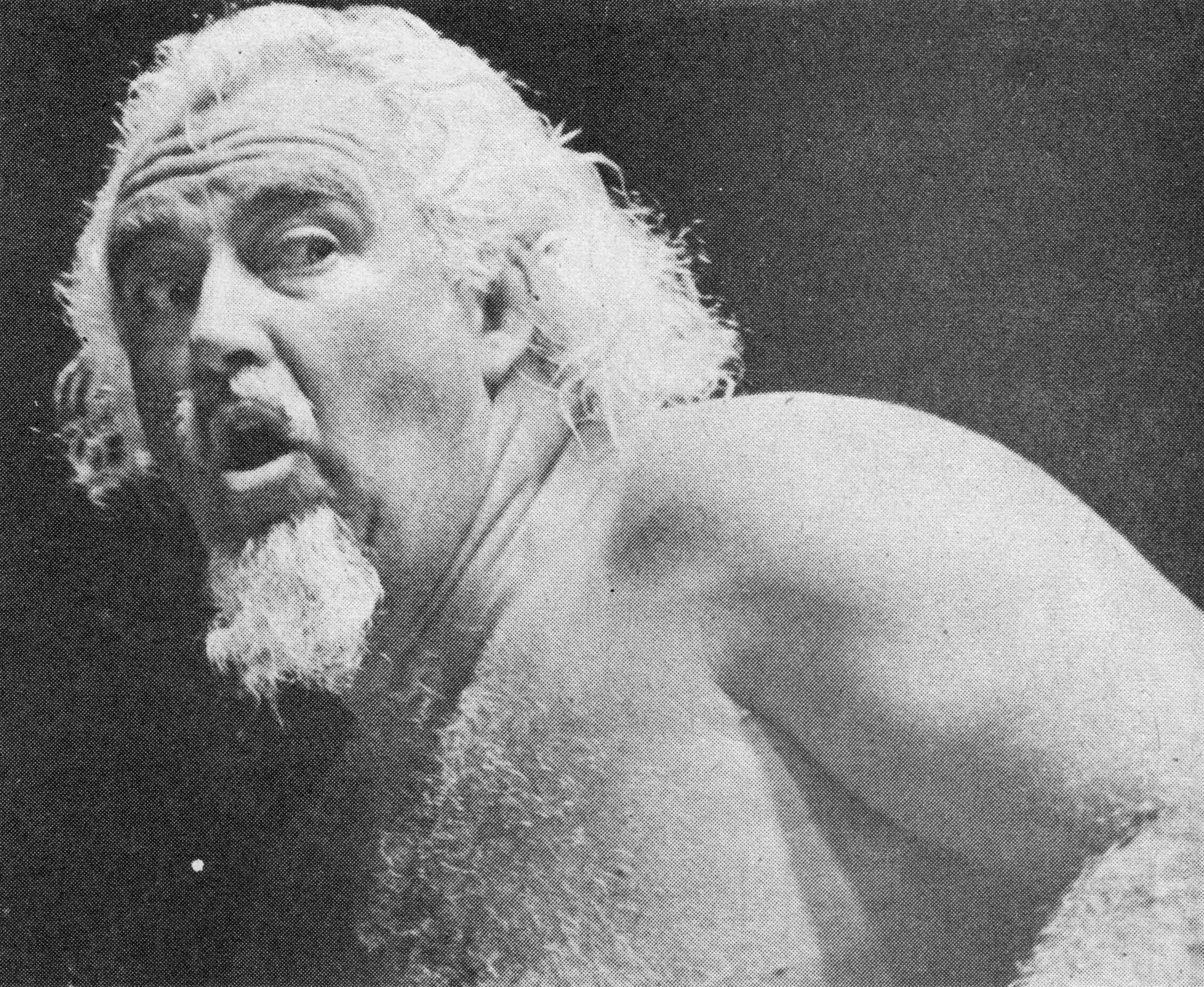

Personal information
- Born: James Grady Johnson; February 5, 1940 Union Point, Georgia, U.S.
- Died: June 23, 2006 (aged 66) Georgia, U.S.
- Children: 6

Professional wrestling career
- Ring name(s): Billy Calhoun; James Wolfe; El Lobo; Luke Graham; Mighty Yankee; Pretty Boy Calhoun; Wolfman Savage
- Billed height: 6 ft 1 in (185 cm)
- Billed weight: 277 lb (126 kg)
- Debut: 1961
- Retired: 1987

James Grady Johnson (February 5, 1940 – June 23, 2006) was an American professional wrestler, best known by his ring name, "Crazy" Luke Graham. As Luke Graham, Johnson was part of the Graham family, a stable of wrestlers. All members were billed as kayfabe brothers. He worked extensively for various National Wrestling Alliance territories as well as the World Wide Wrestling Federation, where he was a three-time tag-team champion and the inaugural WWWF World Tag Team Champion (alongside Tarzan Tyler).

== Professional wrestling career ==
Johnson made his debut in 1961 in National Wrestling Alliance's Mid-America territory. He began his career as the Kayfabe brother of Dr. Jerry Graham after fellow wrestler Frankie Cain (The Great Mephisto) suggested that they resembled each other. They began wrestling together in 1963 in Stampede Wrestling. Starting that summer, Graham would go on to have a series of matches against Chief Big Heart.

Beginning in 1964 he started wrestling for the World Wide Wrestling Federation (WWWF) with Jerry Graham . They won the WWWF United States Tag Team Championship from Don McClarity and Argentina Apollo, holding it for eight months, before losing the belts to another heel tagteam, Gene Kiniski and Waldo Von Erich. It was during this time that he became known as "Crazy" Luke Graham. Graham left the Northeast territory after the loss and returned to the WWWF as a singles wrestler from 1966-1969; feuding with Miguel Perez, Antonio Pugliese and Bruno Sammartino.

Graham enjoyed most of his success for the Los Angeles territory in the mid to late 1960s. During this period he held the WWA World Title once in 1965 which he won by defeating future WWE champion Pedro Morales at a house show on July 23. He held the title for 86 days before losing it . He dropped the belt back to Pedro Morales. For rest of the 1960s, he was a mid card performer for Verne Gagne's American Wrestling Association (AWA) out of Minneapolis. Failing to find any mainstream success he departed AWA for Vince McMahon's WWWF.

After leaving the AWA, Luke returned to WWWF and had a brief run with Tarzan Tyler as the inaugural WWWF Tag Team Champions in 1971. One story was that the team allegedly defeated Dick the Bruiser and The Sheik for the belts, however, no record of any match between the two teams has ever been documented. The other story is that they won it from Bepo and Geeto Mongol. Once champions, the team held the belts for six months while feuding with Chief Jay Strongbow, Gorilla Monsoon, and Pedro Morales. He and Tyler also went on to win the WWF International Tagteam Championship in November 1971 from Bepo and Geeto Mongol. They lost it back to the Mongols after a month. After losing the title he again left WWWF and went to on to wrestle in the Georgia territory.

He fought in Florida as El Lobo in 1970. In 1974, he was the United States Champion in the Pacific Northeast. After that he left for Georgia Championship Wrestling where he won the NWA Georgia Heavyweight championship in a tournament on April 20. In 1978, Graham return to the WWWF this time being managed by The Grand Wizard. He had epic feuds with Andre the Giant, Dino Bravo, Haystacks Calhoun, Ivan Putski and then WWWF champion Bob Backlund. He even teamed with his "brother" Superstar Billy Graham. After WWWF, Graham continued to work in the Southern states. He retired in 1987. He teamed with his son, Luke Jr., however, in 2001 and started Galaxy Championship Wrestling, Inc.

== Professional wrestling style and persona ==
Grady Johnson's Luke Graham persona was known for his "craziness". Whenever someone referred to him as "Crazy" Luke Graham, as part of his gimmick he would claim to be sane and cover his ears. He had bleached hair and goatee. His signature moves included the atomic drop and stabbing people with his taped thumb (which he called the "Golden Spike").

Graham's storyline brothers were "Doctor" Jerry Graham (Jerramiah Martin Mathews), Superstar Billy Graham (Wayne Coleman), former wrestler/promoter Eddie Graham (Eddie Gosset). Other Family members include: Tommy "T.G." Graham (William Pawlak), Troy "The Dream Machine/Warrior" Graham (Troy R. Tompson), Eddie Graham's son Mike Graham (Mike Gosset), and Luke Graham's son, "Crazy" Luke Graham Jr. (Donald J. Jolly), and nephew, Gerry "Chubby" Graham (M. Gerald Sadler). All Graham Family members are reported as retired. Dr Jerry, Eddie, Luke Sr, Billy and Mike are among the family members that are reported deceased.

== Death ==
Johnson, who had a pacemaker, died from congestive heart failure on June 23, 2006, at the age of 66.

== Championships and accomplishments ==
- 50th State Big Time Wrestling
  - NWA Hawaii Heavyweight Championship (1 time)
  - NWA Hawaii Tag Team Championship (1 time) – with Ripper Collins
- Central States Wrestling
  - NWA Central States Heavyweight Championship (1 time)
- Deep South Wrestling
  - DSW Brass Knuckles Championship (1 time, final)
- Eastern Wrestling Association
  - EWA United States Brass Knuckles Championship (1 time)
- Georgia Championship Wrestling
  - NWA Georgia Heavyweight Championship (1 time)
  - NWA Georgia Television Championship (1 time)
  - NWA Macon Tag Team Championship (1 time) – with Moondog Mayne
  - NWA Southeastern Heavyweight Championship (Georgia version) (1 time)
  - NWA Southeastern Tag Team Championship (Georgia version) (1 time) – with Al Galanto
- NWA Detroit
  - NWA World Tag Team Championship (Detroit version) (1 time) – with Ripper Collins
- NWA Mid-America
  - NWA Alabama Tag Team Championship (1 time) – with Ripper Collins
  - NWA Mid-America Heavyweight Championship (2 times)
  - NWA Tennessee Tag Team Championship (1 time) – with Ripper Collins
  - NWA World Tag Team Championship (Mid-America version) (1 time) – with Karl Von Brauner
- Worldwide Wrestling Associates
  - WWA World Heavyweight Championship (1 time)
  - WWA World Tag Team Championship (1 time) – with Gorilla Monsoon
- Stampede Wrestling
  - Stampede Wrestling International Tag Team Championship (1 time) – with Jim Wright
- World Wrestling Council
  - WWC Caribbean Heavyweight Championship (1 time)
  - WWC North American Heavyweight Championship (1 time)
  - WWC North American Tag Team Championship (2 times) – with Gorgeous George Jr. (1 time) and Bulldog Brower (1 time)
- World Wide Wrestling Federation
  - WWWF International Tag Team Championship (1 time) – with Tarzan Tyler
  - WWWF United States Tag Team Championship (1 time) – with Dr. Jerry Graham
  - WWWF World Tag Team Championship (1 time, inaugural) – with Tarzan Tyler
