= Spiros Arion =

Former professional wrestler (born 1940)

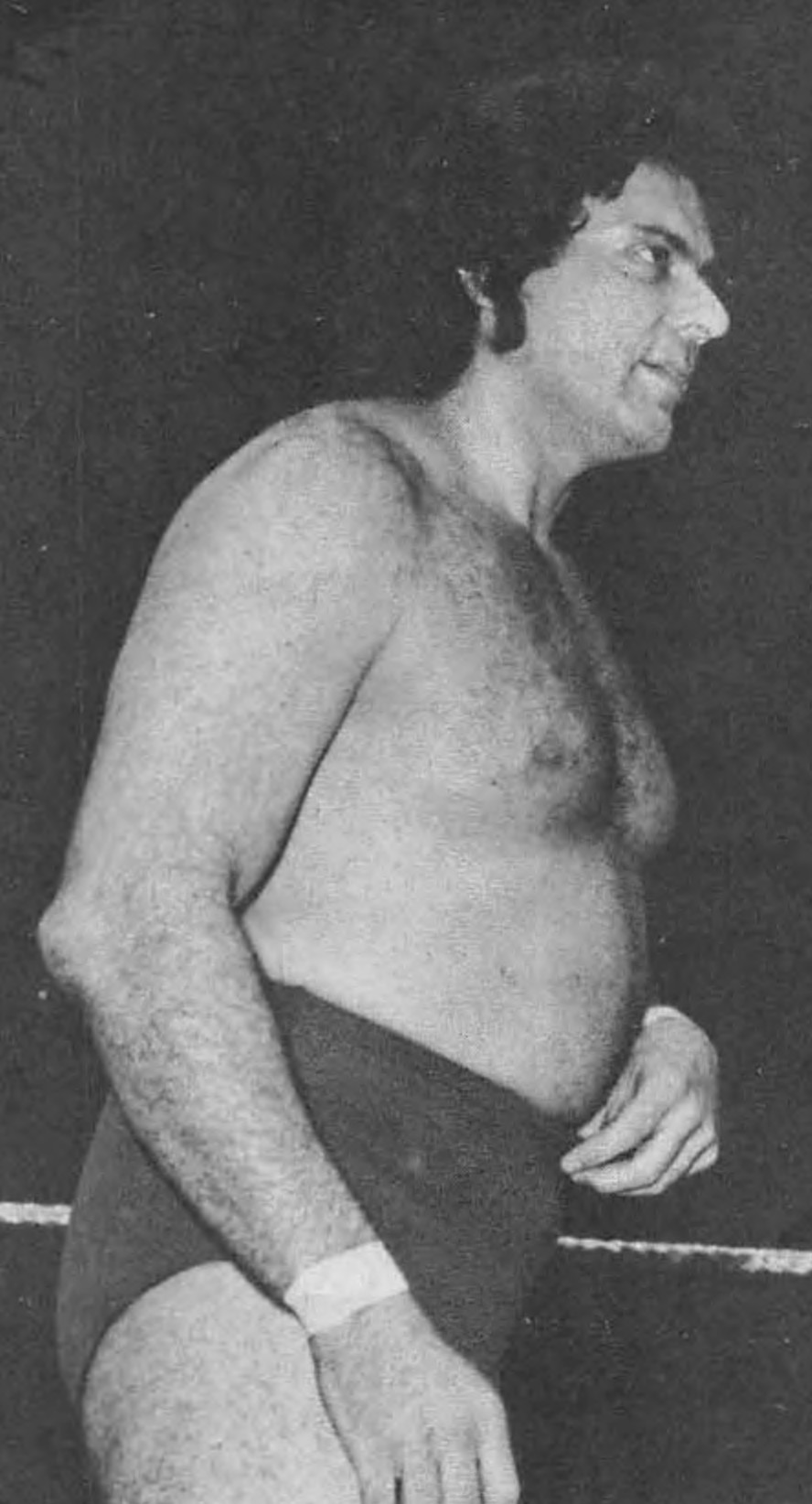
- Arion, circa 1979

Personal information
- Born: Spyridon Manousakis; September 3, 1940 (age 86) Cairo, Egypt

Professional wrestling career
- Ring name: Spiros Arion
- Billed height: 6 ft 5 in (1.96 m)
- Billed weight: 285 lb (129 kg)
- Trained by: Andre Bollet
- Debut: 1961
- Retired: 1980

Spiros Arion (Greek: Σπύρος Αρίων) born Spyridon Manousakis (Greek: Σπυρίδων Μανουσάκης) (born September 3, 1940) is an Egyptian-born Greek former professional wrestler who had an extensive and successful career, mainly in Australia and the United States. Known as The Golden Greek and The Iron Greek, he debuted in 1961 and retired in 1979.

== Professional wrestling career ==
=== Early life ===
Spiros Arion was born Spyridon Manousakis in September 1940 in the Egyptian capital, Cairo, to Greek parents, Stavros and Konstantina. He spent his early childhood in Egypt and migrated with his family in his teens to Athens, Greece. Here, he excelled in Greco-Roman wrestling. Charismatic and strong, he made an early mark on European mats, often billed as the son of his mentor, the veteran Greek wrestler Andreas Lambrakis.

=== Europe (1961–1964) ===
Arion was trained for professional wrestling by Frenchman Andre Bollet. He debuted in 1961 in Paris. For over four years, he wrestled around Europe before settling in Australia.

=== Australia (1964–1976) ===
In July 1964, Arion arrived on the Australian wrestling scene, nicknamed "The Golden Greek", and quickly became a fan favorite. He joined World Championship Wrestling and wrestled there until its end in 1978. He also wrestled in IWA Australia. In 1965, he won the IWA World Heavyweight Championship and IWA Tag Team Championship.

Arion finished 1965 as IWA World Champion. He dropped the belt to Killer Kowalski, then regained it. In 1966, he defended it from the 400-pound King Kong Czaja. He was a part of many angles in IWA and WCW. In 1974, he was awarded the IWA Austra-Asian Heavyweight Championship and defended it against Bobby Shane.

=== America (1966–1978) ===
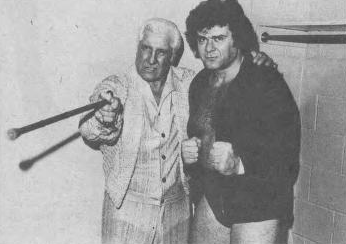
Arion (right) and his manager Freddie Blassie (left)

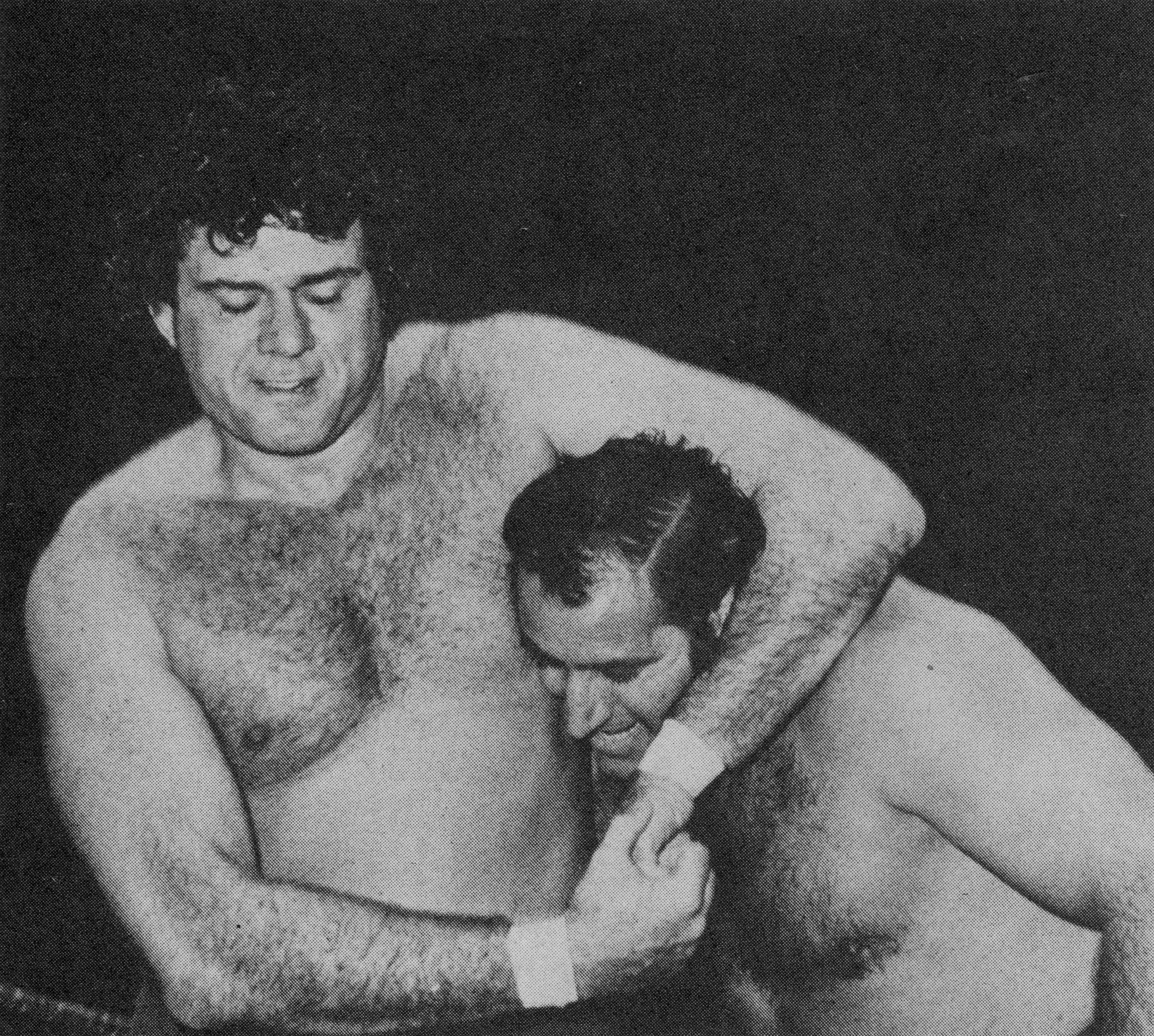
Arion with a headlock on Dominic DeNucci in a match at Madison Square Garden on November 17, 1975

In 1966, Arion went to America and debuted in the World Wide Wrestling Federation. He quickly became a star, defeating top opponents including Dr. Bill Miller, Cowboy Rocky Fitzpatrick (Bob Orton Sr.), Gorilla Monsoon, Johnny Valentine, Crazy Luke Graham, Bull Ortega, The Sheik and George Steele. His finishing move was often "the hotseat", later renamed "the Greek backbreaker". In his second match in the U.S., he teamed with Tony Parisi to defeat Baron Mikel Scicluna and Smasher Sloan on Washington, DC television for the WWWF United States Tag Team Championship. They were never defeated for the belts; in June 1967, Parisi gave his to Arnold Skaaland, beginning Arion's second reign. On 10 July 1967, they lost the title to The Sicilians (Lou Albano and Tony Altomare). He became a protégé of WWWF World Heavyweight Champion Bruno Sammartino and they both beat up The Sicilians, winning in two straight falls on 24 July to become the final U.S. Tag Team Champions.

Sammartino and Arion teamed up to main event at Madison Square Garden, twice against Gorilla Monsoon and Professor Toru Tanaka. Monsoon and Tanaka won the first match by disqualification; Arion and Sammartino won decisively in a Texas Death rematch, two falls to one.

Arion returned to the WWWF in 1974 and was instantly a fan favorite when he teamed with Chief Jay Strongbow. Before they faced The Valiant Brothers for the WWWF Tag Team Championship, there were signs they would not last. While Arion was struggling in a singles match with Killer Kowalski, Strongbow came to his aid, the outside interference costing him the match via disqualification. Arion was enraged after his first singles loss in the U.S. In their title match, he turned heel on Strongbow, soon taking Freddie Blassie as his manager. Various acts intensified the fans' hatred of him, including ripping Strongbow's headdress to shreds and pinning him in numerous arenas.

Before viciously beating Sammartino's protégé, Larry Zbyszko, at Madison Square Garden, Arion explained the apparent mismatch as an opportunity for the rookie, who he called a "friend". Sammartino ran in at the end, after the pin, to prevent further harm. He had a three-bout series at Madison Square Garden against Sammartino, whose focus on his singles title Arion blamed for losing their tag title.

In early 1976, Arion left the WWWF, and returned in late 1977. In 1978, he partnered with Blassie's newest turncoat, the once-popular Victor Rivera. Following a TV match in Hamburg, Pennsylvania, he was stabbed in the chest by a male spectator as he and Blassie were leaving the ring.

=== Britain (1979–1980) ===
In 1979 Arion, billed as "The Iron Greek", arrived in Joint Promotions claiming a version of the Mountevans Rules World Heavyweight Championship. The British wrestling press hyped him as the first foreign world heavyweight champion to enter the country since Lou Thesz in the 1950s. He made televised defences of his championship against such opponents as Colin Joynson, Lee Bronson and Romany Riley before losing it to Wayne Bridges at the Royal Albert Hall and leaving the country. The title he introduced was contested for over a decade afterward in Joint Promotions and All Star Wrestling, held by Bridges, Mighty John Quinn, Tony St. Clair and Kendo Nagasaki before final champion Bridges retired with it in 1990.

== Championships and accomplishments ==
- Joint Promotions
  - Mountevans Rules World Heavyweight Championship (1 time)
- Pro Wrestling Illustrated
  - PWI Match of the Year (1975) vs. Bruno Sammartino on 17 March
- World Championship Wrestling (Australia)
  - IWA World Heavyweight Championship (6 times)
  - IWA World Tag Team Championship (2 times) – with Mario Milano (1 time) and Mark Lewin (1 time)
  - NWA Austra-Asian Heavyweight Championship (3 times)
  - NWA Austra-Asian Tag Team Championship (1 time) – with Mark Lewin
- World Wide Wrestling Federation
  - WWWF United States Tag Team Championship (3 times, final) – with Tony Parisi (1 time), Arnold Skaaland (1 time), and Bruno Sammartino (1 time)
- Wrestling Observer Newsletter
  - Wrestling Observer Newsletter Hall of Fame (2025)
