= Red Bastien =

American professional wrestler (1931–2012)

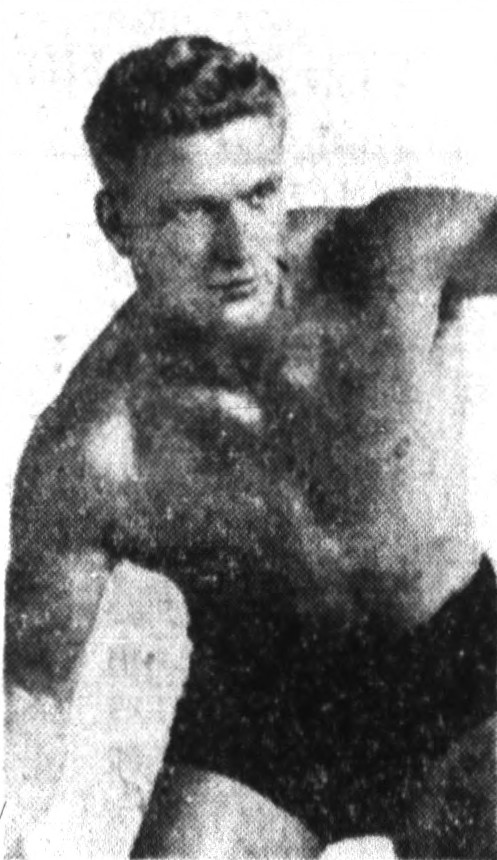
- Bastien, circa 1956

Personal information
- Born: Rolland Bastien; January 27, 1931 Bottineau, North Dakota, U.S.
- Died: August 11, 2012 (aged 81) Minnetonka, Minnesota, U.S.

Professional wrestling career
- Ring name(s): Flying Red Bastein; Red Bastien; Texas Red
- Billed height: 6 ft 0 in (183 cm)
- Billed weight: 242 lb (110 kg)
- Debut: 1956
- Retired: 1980

4th President of the Cauliflower Alley Club
- In office 2001–2007
- Preceded by: Lou Thesz
- Succeeded by: Nick Bockwinkel

Rolland "Red" Bastien (January 27, 1931 – August 11, 2012) was an American professional wrestler best known for his time in Capital Wrestling Corporation where he was a three-time WWWF United States Tag Team Champion with his kayfabe brother, Lou Bastien.

== Professional wrestling career ==
He took part in football and swimming in high school and broke in on Midwest carnivals, fighting local toughs and learning wrestling the hard way. Turning professional, he began in Chicago, Illinois and toured the United States with great success. Bastien was small for a wrestler at 185 pounds, but he was quick, vigorous, fast and employed a wide assortment of aerial moves. His teachers were Henry Kolln, Einar Olsen, Joe Pazandak and Verne Gagne, and his peak years were from 1959 to 1971. His favorite finishing moves were the dropkick, flying head scissors, atomic drop and abdominal stretch.

Bastien teamed up with Lou Klein to form the Bastien Brothers tag team and, in 1960, won the United States Tag Team Championship from Eddie and Jerry Graham in April 1960. They won the title twice more in 1960, from the Grahams and then from the Fabulous Kangaroos (Roy Heffernan and Al Costello). Bastien went on to win several more tag team championships.

Bastien was the frequent tag team partner of Billy Red Lyons. The duo unmasked wrestler Don Jardine in 1972.

Bastien was the booker in Dallas, Texas.

In 1964, Bastein appeared in the World Wide Wrestling Federation (WWWF) and teamed briefly with champion Bruno Sammartino. He returned for one match in Madison Square Garden in June 1970 (his last appearance there), being pinned by Professor Tanaka but prior to that, putting on an amazing performance, dominating most of the match.

He had a hot main event run in Florida in the late 1960s, including memorable bouts with Johnny Valentine.

In September and October 1971, Bastien wrestled in Japan for the International Wrestling Enterprise promotion as part of its Dynamite Series. In his debut match, he teamed with Bill Howard to defeat Rusher Kimura and Thunder Sugiyama for the vacant IWA World Tag Team Championship in a two-out-of-three falls match. They lost the titles to Kimura and Sugiyama several weeks later. Bastien made further tours with International Wrestling Enterprise in winter 1972 and winter 1973.

In the mid to late 1970s, he returned to the WWWF/WWF, wrestling under a mask as "Texas Red".

In his retirement, Bastien became a trainer and a promoter, and discovered future wrestlers Sting (Steve Borden) and the Ultimate Warrior (Jim Hellwig) at a Gold's Gym and convinced them to become professional wrestlers. Bastien and professional wrestling manager Rick Bassman formed an alliance of wrestlers called Powerteam USA, of which Borden and Hellwig were a part. The team debuted in November 1985, and after the other two members left the group, Borden and Hellwig continued to tag together.

== Personal life ==
Bastien was good friends with fellow wrestler Roddy Piper and was the best man at his wedding. Bastien served as president of the Cauliflower Alley Club for six years from 2001 to 2007, but was reported in 2010 to be suffering from Alzheimer's disease, his health progressively getting worse. Bastien died on August 11, 2012, at age 81.

== Championships and accomplishments ==
- American Wrestling Alliance

- AWA World Tag Team Championship (2 times) - with Lou Bastien

- American Wrestling Association

- AWA World Tag Team Championship (1 time) - with Hercules Cortez and replacement partner The Crusher (1)

- Capitol Wrestling Corporation

- NWA United States Tag Team Championship (Northeast version) (3 times) - with Lou Bastien

- Cauliflower Alley Club

- President (2001-2007)

- Championship Wrestling from Florida

- NWA Florida Heavyweight Championship (1 time)
- NWA Southern Heavyweight Championship (Florida version) (1 time)

- George Tragos/Lou Thesz Professional Wrestling Hall of Fame
  - Class of 2007
- International Wrestling Enterprise

- IWA Tag Team Championship (1 time) - with Bill Howard

- NWA All-Star Wrestling

- NWA Canadian Tag Team Championship (Vancouver version) (1 time) - with Jim Hady

- NWA Big Time Wrestling

- NWA Texas Heavyweight Championship (2 times)
- NWA Texas Junior Heavyweight Championship (1 time)
- NWA Texas Tag Team Championship (2 times) - with Billy Red Lyons (1) and Tex McKenzie (1)

- NWA Hollywood Wrestling

- NWA Americas Heavyweight Championship (2 times)
- NWA Americas Tag Team Championship (1 time) - with Victor Rivera
- NWA International Television Tag Team Championship (1 time) - with Bearcat Wright

- Pacific Northwest Wrestling

- NWA Pacific Northwest Tag Team Championship (2 times) - with Andre Drapp (1) and Roy Heffernan (1)
- Pacific Coast Junior Heavyweight Championship (1 time)

- Professional Wrestling Championship

- Lifetime Achievement Award (2006)

- Professional Wrestling Hall of Fame
  - Class of 2018 Inducted under Executive and under Tag Team as a member of The Flying Redheads.
- World Championship Wrestling (Australia)

- IWA World Tag Team Championship (3 times) - with Mario Milano
