= Fabulous Kangaroos =

Professional wrestling tag team

- Costello (left), Berry (middle) and Heffernan (right)

Tag team
- Members: Al Costello; Roy Heffernan; Wild Red Berry; Ray St. Clair; Don Kent; Tony Charles; Bruno Bekkar; Johnny Heffernan
- Name(s): Fabulous Kangaroos; The Kangaroos; Kangaroo Men
- Billed from: Australia
- Debut: 1957
- Disbanded: 1983
- Years active: 1957-1983

This team is not to be mistaken for the similarly named team The Royal Kangaroos of Jonathan Boyd and Norman Frederick Charles III

The Fabulous Kangaroos were a professional wrestling tag team who existed in various forms from 1957 until 1983. The first incarnation of The Fabulous Kangaroos was formed when Italian Australian Al Costello teamed with Australia native Roy Heffernan and adopted an "Ultra Australian" gimmick complete with boomerangs, bush hats, and the song "Waltzing Matilda" as their entrance music. Costello and Heffernan are arguably the most famous version of The Kangaroos, regarded as one of the top tag teams to ever compete in professional wrestling, and are often credited with popularizing tag team wrestling in the late 1950s and 1960s.

Later versions of The Kangaroos saw Al Costello team with Ray St. Clair in 1967, and then with Don Kent from 1968 until 1974. Don Kent went on to team with Bruno Bekkar, and later Johnny Heffernan (a storyline cousin of Roy Heffernan) to keep The Fabulous Kangaroos name alive until 1983.

The Fabulous Kangaroos made their last appearance in 1983, but almost a decade later, the then 72-year-old Al Costello managed a team known as "The New Fabulous Kangaroos" in the American Independent circuit. The New Fabulous Kangaroos consisted of little known wrestlers Mickey Doyle, Denny Kass and Al Snow; of the three, only Snow went on to national and international recognition.

Both Costello and Heffernan died before The Kangaroos were honored as the first tag team to be inducted into the Professional Wrestling Hall of Fame in 2003, which started a tradition of inducting a new team every year.

== Career ==
=== Al Costello and Roy Heffernan ===
"The Fabulous Kangaroos" were the brainchild of Al Costello, who had spent the first 18 years of his wrestling career as a fairly unsuccessful singles competitor. In 1956, Costello mentioned his idea of an "Ultra Australian" tag team to fellow wrestler, and future promoter, Joe Blanchard. Blanchard happened to be a good friend of Roy Heffernan, who had previously trained with Costello and became his choice for a partner. Costello and Heffernan made their debut as The Fabulous Kangaroos on 3 May 1957, for Stu Hart's Stampede Wrestling promotion of Canada, in a match against Maurice LaPointe and Tony Baillargeon. Only weeks after making their debut, The Kangaroos were working with the top tag teams of the promotion.

After working in Stampede for a while The Fabulous Kangaroos started to travel across the United States, headlining shows wherever they went due to their ability to rile up crowds with their heel (bad guy) tactics. On one occasion in August 1958, The Kangaroos, or "Kangaroo Men" as they were billed, nearly caused a riot in Madison Square Garden during a match against Antonino Rocca and Miguel Pérez; the fans began to throw fruit and stones at them. After the match ended without a decisive winner, the promoters stepped in, turned up the arena lights, and played the National Anthem to stop a potential riot. This was a common tactic used at the time by the New York promoters to prevent riots and help the heels leave the arena unharmed. Later that year, Costello and Heffernan started working for Dory Funk's NWA Western States promotion based in Amarillo, Texas. Here, The Kangaroos won their first title as a team when they defeated Pepper Gomez and El Medico to win the Texas version of the NWA World Tag Team Championship on 17 November 1958. Their first title reign was short lived, however, as Pepper Gomez and Rito Romero defeated them to regain the titles two weeks later.

The following year, The Fabulous Kangaroos won the main tag team titles in NWA New Mexico, as well as the Texas version of the NWA International Tag Team Championship. In 1960 the Kangaroos moved on to New York, where they worked for Capitol Wrestling (predecessor to the modern-day WWE). On 21 July 1960 The Fabulous Kangaroos defeated Red and Lou Bastien to claim the North East version of the NWA United States Tag Team Championship (which was later known as the WWWF United States Tag Team Championship). The Bastien brothers sought revenge and regained the gold during a rematch on 8 August 1960. This time, the Bastiens' title reign only lasted 16 days when The Fabulous Kangaroos beat them again in Washington, D.C. to become two-time United States champions. Their second tenure as champions lasted almost three months, before they were defeated by Johnny Valentine and Buddy Rogers on 19 November 1960. Costello and Heffernan won the titles for a third time only a week later and carried the gold into 1961. On 11 January 1962, The Kangaroos third title reign ended when they lost to the team of Johnny Valentine and Bob Ellis. This third reign is the longest reign with this championship by any team. It was also the longest reign by any team with any tag team championship in WWF/WWWF history until exceeded by WWF World Tag Team Champions Demolition on 12 May 1989. In 2016, the Kangaroos' reign was pushed down into third place by The New Day's reign with the WWE Raw Tag Team Championship and further sixth place by The Usos with the WWE SmackDown Tag Team Championship as of 2026.

As was common in their day, The Kangaroos began to move around between territories to avoid overexposure. The team arrived in Championship Wrestling from Florida billed as NWA Florida United States Tag Team Champions. It was a tag team title they never technically won, but were instead awarded by the promoter. The Kangaroos stayed in Florida, defending against all challengers until the duo of Eddie Graham and Dick Steinborn took the United States titles from them in a match on 1 November 1961. In 1962, The Kangaroos once again traveled across the United States, working for the Midwest Wrestling Association of Ohio where they held the Ohio version of the NWA United States tag team title. They also toured Japan with the Japan Wrestling Association and were the first to hold the Japanese version of the NWA International Tag Team Championship. In 1964, Costello and Heffernan made their west coast debut, working in Los Angeles, California for the World Wrestling Association (WWA) where they beat Édouard Carpentier and Ernie Ladd for the WWA World Tag Team Championship. The Kangaroos held the titles for three months before losing them to the Torres brothers (Alberto and Ramon) on 28 April 1964.

The Kangaroos never forgot their roots, and continued to work in Canada off and on through the years; in addition to Stampede Wrestling, the team also worked for NWA All-Star Wrestling based in Vancouver, British Columbia. While working for All-Star Wrestling, The Kangaroos were involved in a heated storyline with Don Leo Jonathan and Roy McClarty that sold-out arenas all across the territory. On 25 May 1964 The Kangaroos won the Vancouver version of the NWA Canadian Tag Team Championship, and immediately had to fend off the challenges of Jonathan and McClarty. During one infamous match in Winnipeg, The Kangaroos made Stan Stasiak an "honorary Kangaroo" for the night (complete with bush hat and all) for a six-man tag team match against Jonathan, McClarty and Karl Gotch. During the match The Kangaroos' cheating tactics aggravated the crowd so much that the fans threw chairs at the team. The Kangaroos attempted to hide under the ring to escape the flying chairs, but rabid fans tried to light the ring apron on fire to "smoke out" The Kangaroos. Peace was restored before anyone got seriously hurt and Jonathan and McClarty defeated The Kangaroos for the Canadian Tag Team titles, only to lose them back to the team from "Down Under" less than a month later. The Fabulous Kangaroos held the Canadian Tag team titles a total of four times while working for All-Star wrestling, losing them for the final time on 17 May 1965 to the team of Don Leo Jonathan and Jim Hardy. For the better part of a year The Kangaroos had been double champions, holding both the Canadian Tag Team titles and the All-Star version of the NWA International Tag Team titles.

Their time in NWA All-Star Wrestling was the last time the original Kangaroos teamed together. In June 1965, The Kangaroos lost to Don Leo Jonathan and Jim Hardy, and then split up. Heffernan had left Australia to tour the world in 1953 and wanted to return to his homeland, while Costello was determined to remain in the United States for a while longer.

=== Al Costello and Ray St. Clair ===
In 1967, after having wrestled with other partners, including a stint as The Internationals with Karl Von Brauner, Costello decided that he wanted to reform The Fabulous Kangaroos. He got in touch with a friend from Great Britain, Tinker Todd, and asked him to be his new partner and reform The Fabulous Kangaroos. Todd agreed, taking the name "Ray St. Clair" (unrelated to fellow Englishman Roy StClair, brother and tag partner of Tony St. Clair) and adopting an "Australian" persona. George "Crybaby" Cannon had managed Costello and Von Brauner when they wrestled as The Internationals, and he was brought in to be The Kangaroos new manager. Not long after Costello and St. Clair hit the circuit, they captured both gold and the hatred of the crowd, just like the original Kangaroos. A couple of months after reforming, Costello and St. Clair won the NWA Detroit version of the NWA World Tag Team Championship from Fred Curry and Billy Red Lyons, but lost the titles to Fred Curry and Dan Miller a few weeks later. Costello and St. Clair showed the same gift for riling up the fans as Costello and Heffernan had and even caused their own share of riots. One particular event in Cincinnati, Ohio saw the predominantly African American crowd start a riot after The Kangaroos spat in the eye of the African American Bobo Brazil during a match. The crowd rushed towards the ring when a fan fell from the balcony, causing a diversion that enabled Costello and St. Clair to escape the ring and get back to their dressing room. When fans started to break down the door to the dressing room, The Kangaroos ducked out the back, ran down an alley and hid in a half full dumpster overnight. The next morning when The Kangaroos returned to their car, they found all four tires slashed. Despite the success of the new version of The Fabulous Kangaroos, the Costello / St. Ray team did not last more than six tumultuous months. St. Clair missed his native Britain and was suffering from a debilitating knee injury that meant he had to retire from wrestling altogether.

=== Al Costello and Don Kent ===
Costello was not ready to give up on The Fabulous Kangaroos concept after St. Clair retired, and a few months later he found a new man to don the bush hat: Don Kent. Kent, who was from Michigan, adopted the Ultra-Australian gimmick (but retained his American accent) and the two formed the third overall and second most well-known version of the Fabulous Kangaroos. Costello and Kent continued in a tradition that was reminiscent of the original Kangaroos; when a federation needed a new tag team title, the Kangaroos were brought in and acknowledged as champions on arrival instead of holding a tournament to determine the champions. In 1967, the Japanese federation International Wrestling Enterprise (IWE) brought the Kangaroos in as the first Trans-World Wrestling Alliance World Tag Team Champions. They held this title until 10 January 1968 when IWE mainstays Toyonobori and Thunder Sugiyama beat them for the gold.

Their time in Japan was only the first of many international tours for these third generation Kangaroos; they worked all over Asia as well as in Costello's homeland of Australia. In 1969, the Kangaroos wrestled for the newly created Eastern Sports Association (ESA) out of Halifax, Nova Scotia, where they were once again recognized as champions on their arrival, becoming the inaugural holders of the ESA International Tag Team Championship. On 5 August 1969, the Kangaroos dropped the titles to Eastern Sports Association mainstays The Beast and Rudy Kay. In 1970, they joined Dick the Bruiser's World Wrestling Association (WWA), where they competed regularly for nearly two years. On 26 December 1970 Costello and Kent defeated WWA World Tag Team Champions Dick the Bruiser and Bill Miller to claim the tag titles. The Kangaroos used every dirty tactic to hold on to the gold for six months before losing the titles to Wilbur Snyder and Moose Cholak. On 18 June 1971, the Kangaroos regained the titles, and held them for just over two months before Wilbur Snyder and Paul Christy beat them for their straps. After leaving the WWA, Costello and Kent made a few appearances in New York for the World Wide Wrestling Federation (WWWF), a promotion the original Fabulous Kangaroos (Al Costello and Roy Hefferman) had previously worked for under the company's former name, Capitol Wrestling. In one of their headline appearances at Madison Square Garden, the Kangaroos wrestled to a 45-minute time limit draw against Terry and Dory Funk, Sr.

The Kangaroos were not only stars in the wrestling world, they also made a series of popular "celebrity baseball" appearances in 1971–1972. At one celebrity all-star game in Three Rivers Stadium, Pittsburgh, PA, the Kangaroos became the stars of the celebrity team by going 7 for 8 collectively and entertaining the fans with their horseplay and comedy antics.

On 18 December 1971, The Fabulous Kangaroos defeated Ben Justice and the Stomper in the tournament finals for the new Detroit version of the NWA World Tag Team Championship. The Kangaroos worked for NWA Detroit for most of 1971, defending the gold until Justice and the Stomper won the titles in July 1972. By the end of 1972, the Kangaroos began working for Nick Gulas’ NWA Mid-America promotion, based in the Southern United States, a promotion that Don Kent had worked for before becoming a Kangaroo. On 1 February 1973, the Kangaroos defeated "The Heavenly Bodies" (Don and Al Green; not to be confused with the 1990s team of the same name) to add yet another version of the NWA World Tag Team Championship, the Mid-America version, to their long list of title accomplishments. The Kangaroos held that title three times between February and 22 September 1973, when they lost to the team of Lorenzo Parente and Randy Curtis. During 1973 George Cannon was replaced as the Kangaroos manager by "Sir" Dudley Clements.

After a match in the Cincinnati Gardens in 1974, an enraged fan took a fire extinguisher off the wall and threw it at Costello and Kent from the balcony of the Gardens. The extinguisher hit Costello in the hip, damaging it so much that he needed hip replacement surgery later that year. The fan was arrested, served 15 days in jail, and fined $50 for damaging the fire extinguisher. The hip injury meant that Costello was unable to compete and The Fabulous Kangaroos split up once again. Don Kent returned to NWA Mid-America to work as a singles wrestler, while Costello had a full hip replacement, and was forced to retire from active competition. In 1975, Costello surprised everyone by returning to professional wrestling as the manager of a team known as "The Love Brothers" (Hartford and Reggie Love). He actually stepped into the ring on occasion as part of special six-man tag team matches.

After recovering from his hip surgery, Costello returned to active competition at the age of 56, teaming up with Tony Charles to form yet another version of The Fabulous Kangaroos. The team defeated Dominic DeNucci and Chris Markoff to win the Detroit version of the NWA World Tag Team title, the same title that Costello and Kent had previously held. The Kangaroos title run was short, however, and they lost their gold to "Crazy" Luke Graham and Ripper Collins. In 1977 Tony Charles was replaced by Don Kent and the two reunited for a tour of Puerto Rico with the World Wrestling Council (WWC). In Puerto Rico, the Kangaroos arrived billed as the WWC World Tag Team Champions, once more to give a newly created title legitimacy. They dropped the titles to Carlos Colón and Jose Rivera on 12 March 1977. The Kangaroos remained in the WWC till 1978, chasing, but never regaining the WWC World Tag Team Championship. After their tour in Puerto Rico ended, Don Kent returned to singles wrestling, and Costello refocused on managing.

=== Don Kent and Bruno Bekkar ===
In 1981, Don Kent donned the bush hat and picked up the boomerang once more after not having worked as a Kangaroo since 1974, except for the short run in 1977. Costello asked Kent to team up with Bruno Bekkar, who was mostly known from working in his native New Zealand and Australia. Kent and Bekkar worked a tour for the WWC while Costello served as their manager. The team won the WWC North American Tag Team titles from Jack and Jerry Brisco on 22 October 1981. They then lost the titles to Invader I and Super Gladiator but quickly gained them back before dropping the titles for good to Invader and Gladiator on 26 January 1982. The Kent and Bekkar team only lasted through one tour of the Caribbean, after which Bruno Bekkar returned to Australia and New Zealand to work for the local promotions there.

=== Don Kent and Johnny Heffernan ===
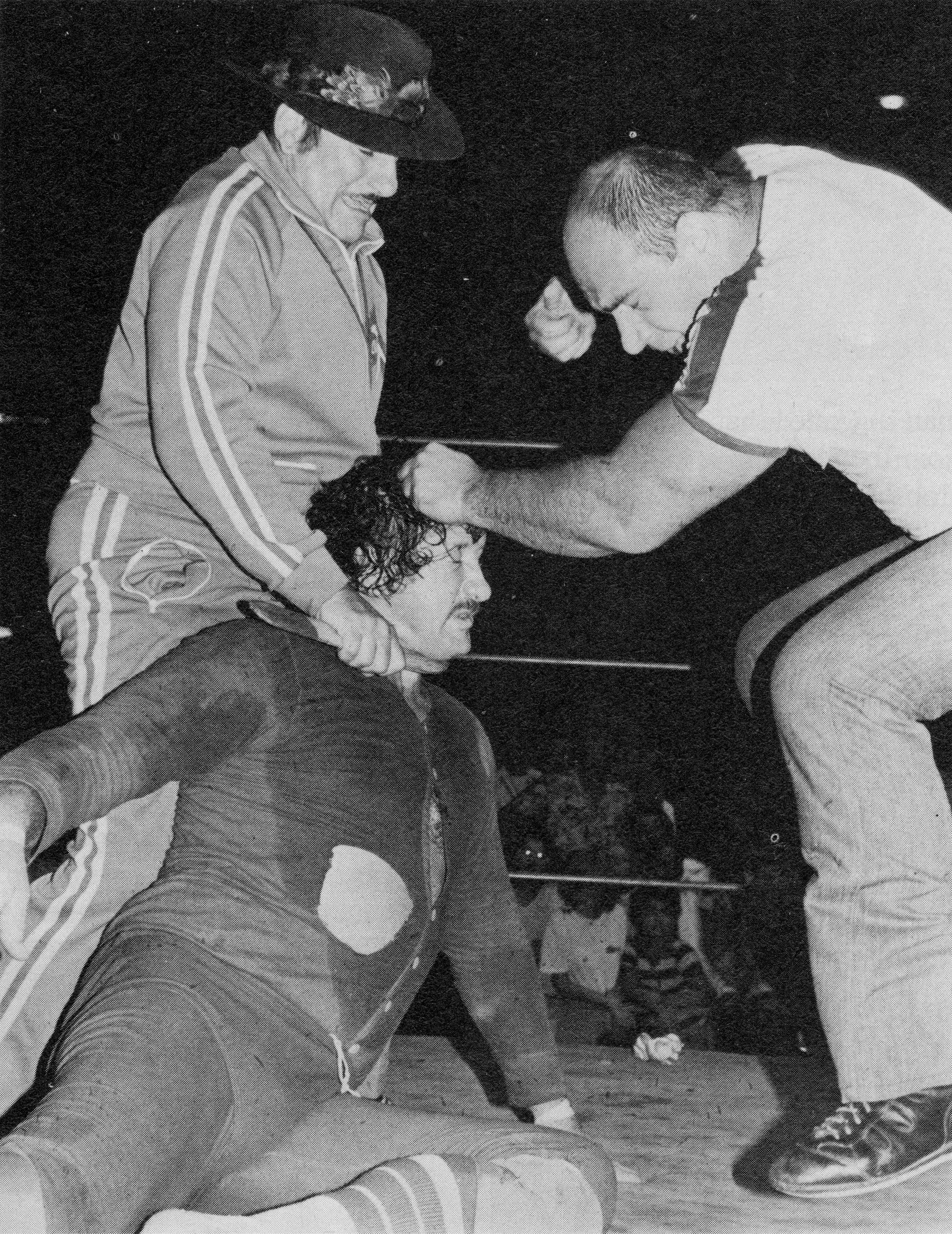
Costello holds Terry Funk with a boomerang around his neck while Heffernan attacks Funk

After Bekkar went back to Australia, Kent found a new partner to create yet another version of the Fabulous Kangaroos that turned out to be the last incarnation of the team. In mid 1982, Kent teamed up with Lutte Internationale mainstay Bob Della Serra, who took the wrestling name "Johnny Heffernan" (or "Bobby Heffernan" at times) - a storyline cousin of Roy Heffernan. The team ended Terry and Dory Funk, Jr.'s year and a half run with the WWC World Tag Team championship on 1 May 1982. Kent and Heffernan held the gold for less than two months before losing the WWC World Tag Team titles to Invader I and Pierre Martel. After a tour in Puerto Rico, Costello Kent and Heffernan returned to work for Championship Wrestling from Florida (CWF), a promotion the Kangaroos last worked for in 1962. On 5 January 1983, the Kangaroos defeated Barry Windham and Ron Bass to win the NWA Florida Global Tag Team Championship. They held the titles four times between January and 13 April 1983, losing to and winning titles from such teams as Terry Allen and Scott McGhee, Terry Allen and The Midnight Rider, and Terry Allen and Brad Armstrong. The final storyline involving The Fabulous Kangaroos saw Al Costello bring in J. J. Dillon to act as his short-term replacement while he was "away on business". When Costello returned from his business trip, Dillon (kayfabe) refused to give up the Kangaroos contracts and was backed up by both Kent and Heffernan. The angle was designed to write Al Costello out of The Fabulous Kangaroos' storyline, and allow him to retire from wrestling altogether. Not long after Costello retired, Kent and Della Serra went their separate ways. Don Kent retired in 1986, but made guest appearances in the ring from time to time as late as 1992.

The New Fabulous Kangaroos

Tag team
- Members: Al Snow; Denny Kass; Micky Doyle; Al Costello (manager)
- Name: The New Fabulous Kangaroos
- Billed from: From Australia
- Debut: 1993
- Disbanded: 1994

=== New Fabulous Kangaroos ===
After retiring from wrestling, Al Costello became the head of security at College Harbor, Florida. In 1992, at the age of 71, Costello retired from his job in Florida and began teaching wrestling. He also started to manage "The New Fabulous Kangaroos" in 1993 consisting of Mickey Doley and Denny Kass who worked for "Motor City Wrestling" (MCW). By the fall of 1993 Mickey Doyle had been replaced by a young wrestler by the name of Al Snow, and with Costello's help The New Fabulous Kangaroos defeated "Canadian Lighting" (Otis Apollo and "Irish" Bobby Clancy) on 29 December 1993 to win the MCW Tag Team Championship. On 14 May 1994, after Al Snow had started working for the World Wrestling Federation (WWF), Kass and Snow defeated Canadian Lighting to win the Border City Wrestling (BCW) Can-Am Tag Team Championship, unifying the two tag team championships. A week later, The New Fabulous Kangaroos lost both sets of titles to Scott D'Amore and "Irish" Bobby Clancy. After losing the unified MCW/BCW Tag Team championships, The New Kangaroos split up. Snow focused on his WWF career, while Costello retired for good.

=== Kangaroo legacy ===
The Fabulous Kangaroos are considered by many in the wrestling world as one of the best tag-teams in the history of wrestling. In fact, many people in the past held the mistaken belief that The Fabulous Kangaroos invented tag team wrestling, which was not true since tag team wrestling had been seen as early as 1936. The reason for this belief lies in the fact that The Kangaroos were one of the first teams to popularize tag team wrestling, and because tag teaming was often referred to as "Australian rules" or "Australian tag team". The Kangaroos themselves were not slow to play off this belief, often claiming (kayfabe) that they were such a well coordinated tag team because "Amateur team wrestling was very popular in Australia". The term "Australian rules" had been coined long before 1957 debut of The Kangaroos. Records indicate that tag team wrestling was already being referred to as "Australian rules" already in the mid-1940s. The Fabulous Kangaroos were among the first people in wrestling to play up the sports entertainment elements in professional wrestling; beyond being talented wrestlers, Costello especially was also very good at playing up their characters. The Kangaroos showed their "advertising" skills through promotional literature, which stated that The Fabulous Kangaroos had "fashioned a razor-edged aluminum boomerang to cut the jugular of a Kodiak bear from afar". They also frequently threw cardboard boomerangs with their name and pictures on them into the crowd as they walked to the ring. The team carried a huge Australian banner with the name "The Fabulous Kangaroos" on it as part of their entrance rituals as well.

=== Kangaroos today ===
Roy Heffernan died on 24 September 1992 in his home in Sydney, Australia from a heart attack. Don Kent died on 14 June 1993 after a long battle with Leukemia. On 22 January 2000, the last of the original Fabulous Kangaroos died. Costello had been suffering from pneumonia, and was diagnosed with heart problems, the combination of which took his life at age 80.

Only Bruno Bekkar and Johnny Heffernan remain alive, with managers Red Berry, George Cannon and Dudley Clement having passed on as well. Ray St. Clair, whose birth name was Ramon Napolitano, died on 14 July 2013.

In 2003, the Professional Wrestling Hall of Fame inducted Al Costello and Roy Heffernan collectively as The Fabulous Kangaroos, the first tag team to be inducted into the Hall of Fame. Since that time, the Hall of Fame has honored other tag teams, but The Fabulous Kangaroos were given the honor of being the first. In the tradition of The Kangaroos, they were "billed as champions on arrival" one last time. In 2013, Costello and Heffernan was inducted into the NWA Hall of Fame.

Denny Kass died on August 22, 2016, at 59 years old.

== Championships and accomplishments ==
=== Costello and Heffernan ===
- Alex Turk Promotions (Winnipeg)

- International Tag Team Championship (2 times)

- Capitol Wrestling Corporation

- NWA United States Tag Team Championship (Northeast version) (3 times)

- Championship Wrestling from Florida

- NWA Florida United States Tag Team Championship (1 time)
- NWA World Tag Team Championship (Florida version) (1 time)

- Japan Wrestling Association

- NWA International Tag Team Championship (1 time)

- Midwest Wrestling Association

- NWA United States Tag Team Championship (Ohio Version) (1 time)

- National Wrestling Alliance

- NWA Hall of Fame (Class of 2013)

- NWA All-Star Wrestling

- NWA Canadian Tag Team Championship (Vancouver version) (4 times)

- NWA Detroit

- NWA World Tag Team Championship (Detroit version) (2 times)

- NWA New Mexico

- Rocky Mountain Tag Team Championship (1 time)

- NWA Western States (Amarillo)

- NWA International Tag Team Championship (Texas version) (1 time) (Note: The NWA International Tag Team Championship (Texas version) was also recognized by World Class Championship Wrestling.)
- NWA World Tag Team Championship (Texas version) (1 time)

- World Wrestling Association (Los Angeles)

- WWA World Tag Team Championship (1 time)

- Professional Wrestling Hall of Fame

- Class of 2003

- Western States Sports
  - NWA World Tag Team Championship (Amarillo version) (1 time)
- Wrestling Observer Newsletter awards

- Wrestling Observer Newsletter Hall of Fame (Class of 1996)

=== Costello and St. Clair ===
- NWA Detroit

- NWA World Tag Team Championship (Detroit version) (1 time)

=== Costello and Kent ===
- Eastern Sports Association

- ESA International Tag Team Championship (1 time)

- International Wrestling Enterprise

- Trans-World Wrestling Alliance World Tag Team Championship (1 time)

- NWA Mid-America

- NWA World Tag Team Championship (Mid-America version) (3 times)

- World Wrestling Association

- WWA World Tag Team Championship (2 times)

- World Wrestling Council

- WWC World Tag Team Championship (1 time)

=== Kent and Bekkar ===
- World Wrestling Council

- WWC Caribbean Tag Team Championship (2 times)
- WWC North American Tag Team Championship (1 time)

=== Kent and Heffernan ===
- Championship Wrestling from Florida

- NWA Florida Global Tag Team Championship (4 times)

- World Wrestling Council

- WWC World Tag Team Championship (1 time)
- WWC North American Tag Team Championship (1 time)

=== New Fabulous Kangaroos ===
- Border City Wrestling

- BCW Can-Am Tag Team Championship (1 time)

- Motor City Wrestling

- MCW Tag Team Championship (1 time)
