= Mikel Scicluna =

Maltese professional wrestler (1929–2010)

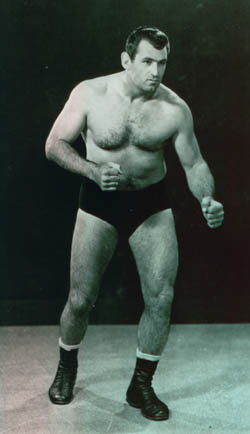
- Scicluna, c. 1970

Personal information
- Born: July 29, 1929 Balzan, Malta
- Died: March 20, 2010 (aged 80) Pittsburgh, Pennsylvania, U.S.
- Cause of death: Pancreatic cancer

Professional wrestling career
- Ring name(s): Baron Mikel Scicluna; Mikel Scicluna; Mike Valentino
- Billed height: 6 ft 3 in (191 cm)
- Billed weight: 256 lb (116 kg)
- Billed from: "Isle of Malta"
- Trained by: Waldo Von Erich
- Debut: 1953
- Retired: November 16, 1987

Mikel Scicluna (July 29, 1929 – March 20, 2010) was a Maltese professional wrestler who gained his fame during the 1960s and 1970s. He reached the peak of his success in the World Wide Wrestling Federation (WWWF), where he held the WWWF United States Tag Team Championship and WWWF World Tag Team Championship.

== Professional wrestling career ==
Scicluna started wrestling during the 1950s, and used the name Mike Valentino early in his career. Scicluna worked primarily in Canada until 1965, when he ventured to the World Wide Wrestling Federation (WWWF), now known as WWE, using his most famous moniker "Baron" Mikel Scicluna.

Scicluna was famous for entering the ring with a royal blue cape over his shoulders, indicating that he was of Maltese royal descent. Scicluna was also known for being a master of the "foreign object", mainly utilizing a roll of coins to bash opponents out of sight of the referee. He enjoyed success as a tag team wrestler, winning the WWWF United States Tag Team Championship with Smasher Sloan on September 22, 1966, in Washington, D.C. (though they eventually lost the belts in the same city to Spiros Arion and Antonio Pugliese), then the WWWF World Tag Team Championship with King Curtis Iaukea on February 1, 1972, in Philadelphia.

In singles competition, Scicluna defeated Spiros Arion for Australia's IWA World Championship on June 15, 1968, and would challenge Bruno Sammartino and Pedro Morales for the WWWF Championship from time to time. One of his biggest career wins was pinning Waldo Von Erich in six minutes at Madison Square Garden, prior to two Garden title matches with Sammartino. In the first match at Madison Square Garden against Sammartino he was disqualified; Sammartino scored the pin in a rematch. Scicluna went on to lose a series of matches to Spiros Arion. In June 1976, Scicluna found himself part of history, as the opponent for Gorilla Monsoon on the night Monsoon engaged in an impromptu tussle with boxing great Muhammad Ali. Scicluna was wrestling Monsoon in a televised match and was sent over the top rope to the floor after receiving a Manchurian Chop. Scicluna waved off his opponent and walked off, taking a count out loss. From there, Ali entered the ring from the audience and tried to jab at Monsoon. Monsoon responded by dropping Ali with an airplane spin. This angle was a part of the build-up toward the Muhammad Ali vs. Antonio Inoki bout later in the month.

Scicluna retired from active competition in 1983. On November 16, 1987, Sciculuna returned to the World Wrestling Federation for a one-night appearance at a house show in East Rutherford, New Jersey, participating in a Legends Battle Royal that was won by Lou Thesz. After that, he retired from wrestling. He was inducted into the WWE Hall of Fame as part of the class of 1996.

== Personal life ==
He was the son of Vincenzo Scicluna and Maria (née Catania) who were married in Mosta, Malta, on 27 August 1927. He was named after his paternal grandfather Michele Scicluna. In retirement, he lived in Pittsburgh, Pennsylvania. He also worked as a driver for the New York Times. He had a wife, Gloria, and one son. Scicluna died on March 20, 2010, from pancreatic cancer.

== Championships and accomplishments ==
- NWA San Francisco
  - NWA World Tag Team Championship (San Francisco version) (3 times) - with Gene Dubuque
- World Championship Wrestling
  - IWA World Heavyweight Championship (1 time)
  - IWA World Tag Team Championship (3 times) - with Ciclón Negro
- World Wide Wrestling Federation
  - WWF Hall of Fame (Class of 1996)
  - WWWF United States Tag Team Championship (1 time) - with Smasher Sloan
  - WWWF World Tag Team Championship (1 time) - with King Curtis Iaukea
- Wrestling Observer Newsletter
  - Most Washed Up Wrestler (1980)
