= Argentina Apollo =

Argentine professional wrestler (1938–1984)

Personal information
- Born: Vincent Denigris; April 28, 1938 Buenos Aires, Argentina
- Died: August 2, 1984 (aged 46) Atlanta, Georgia, U.S.
- Cause of death: Heart Attack

Professional wrestling career
- Ring name(s): Argentina Apollo; Vittorio Apollo; Vicente Denigris
- Billed height: 5 ft 10 in (1.78 m)
- Billed weight: 175 lb (79 kg)
- Billed from: Buenos Aires, Argentina
- Debut: 1960
- Retired: 1975

Vincent Denigris (April 28, 1938 – August 2, 1984) was an Argentine professional wrestler better known by his ring name Vicente Denigris or Argentina Apollo (often Vittorio Argentina Apollo). He was part of the Chicago Comiskey Park shows in 1961, teaming with Antonino Rocca, and a popular star on Studio Wrestling during the 1960s. He achieved his greatest success in WWWF where he was a 1-time WWWF United States Tag team Champion along with Don McClaritty.

== Professional career ==
Apollo made his debut in 1960 in northeastern territories of NWA. He made his debut against Jack Vancy on a house show in New York City under Capital Wrestling corporation. He wrestled extensively for Capital Wrestling Corporation the precursor to WWWF. Also worked for Studio Wrestling in Pittsburgh. His main work was for the World Wide Wrestling Federation 1963-1968 and various territories of the National Wrestling Alliance, most notably, Championship Wrestling from Florida and Georgia Championship Wrestling.

Just a few months in his stint in the CWC, he teamed up with Johnny Valentine to win the WWWF United States Tag Team Championship from the team of the Fabulous Kangaroos (Al Costello and Roy Heffernan). But due to the confines of the time limit curfew, the title did not change hands.

He was best known for his gymnastics in the ring, performing such feats as climbing onto the ropes, performing a back aerial somersault into a roll, then using a handspring to return to his feet and to throw a savate kick to his opponent's midsection. He eventually had to retire due to injuries from his explosive wrestling style. He had his last match in 1975 when he teamed up with Luiz Martinez, to challenge the IWA World Tag Team champions The Mongols (Geeto and Bolo Mongol) for the championship. Apollo and Martinez lost the match and Apollo retired shortly afterwards.

== Death ==
He died on 2 August 1984, due to a heart attack.

== Championships and accomplishments ==
- All-South Wrestling Alliance
  - ASWA Georgia Tag Team Championship (1 time, first) - with Dick Steinborn
- Championship Wrestling from Florida
  - NWA Florida Tag Team Championship (1 time) - with Jose Lothario
- Mid-South Sports
  - NWA Georgia Tag Team Championship (1 time) - with Dick Steinborn
  - NWA Macon Tag Team Championship (1 time) - with Tommy Seigler
  - NWA Southeastern Tag Team Championship (Georgia version) (1 time) - with Roberto Soto
- World Wide Wrestling Federation
  - WWWF United States Tag Team Championship (1 time) - with Don McLarity
- World Wide Wrestling Association
  - WWWA Tag Team Championship (1 time) - with Bruno Sammartino

== See also ==
- List of premature professional wrestling deaths
