= Smasher Sloan =

American professional wrestler (1935–2001)

Personal information
- Born: Eldon Lee Whittler; July 7, 1935 Alton, Illinois, U.S.
- Died: January 29, 2001 (aged 65) Tampa, Florida, U.S.

Professional wrestling career
- Ring names: Smasher Sloan; The Spoiler #2; The Beast; Don Whittler
- Billed height: 6 ft 2 in (188 cm)
- Billed weight: 275 lb (125 kg)
- Billed from: Butte, Montana
- Debut: 1956
- Retired: 1972

Eldon Lee Whittler (July 7, 1935 – January 29, 2001), better known by his ring name Smasher Sloan, was an American professional wrestler. He wrestled for the World Wide Wrestling Federation from the early-1960s till the early-1970s, where he achieved his most success being a 1-time WWWF United States Tag Team Champion along with Baron Mikel Scicluna.

== Professional career ==
Whittler was born on July 7, 1935, in Alton, Illinois. He was the oldest of three children of Margaret Laura (née Harsh; 1916–1995) and Eldon "Whitey" Lee Whittler (1913–1983), who was also a professional wrestler. He made his debut in 1956 as Don Whittler. He initially competed in Championship Wrestling from Florida.

Whittler started performing for the World Wide Wrestling Federation by the early-1960s, where he wrestled as Smasher Sloan. Here he formed a successful tag team with "Baron" Mikel Scicluna. They challenged the reigning champions, Johnny Valentine and Tony Parisi, on September 22, 1966, on a house show in Washington, D.C., in a traditional 2-out-of-3 falls match. Valentine and Parisi won the first fall, but then Johnny suddenly turned heel in the second round when he turned on Parisi and threw him out of the ring. As such, the team of Scicluna and Sloan were the new champions. They eventually lost the championship to the team of Antonio Pugliese and Spiros Arion in a house show on 8 December 1966.

By 1968, Sloan had left WWWF. He then joined the NWA Big Time Wrestling based in Dallas, Texas, which was then managed by Wrestler and promoter Fritz Von Erich. Sloan (Spoiler #2) teamed up with Don Jardine (Spoiler #1) becoming the team known as the Spoilers. They were managed by Gary Hart and went on to win the NWA American Tag Team Championship from the team of Fritz and Billy Red Lyons in 1968. He was eventually unmasked at a house show and left the territory. He also went on to win the NWA Tennessee Tag Team Championship in the NWA Mid-America territory with The Spoiler in 1970.

== Championships ==
- American Wrestling Association
  - Nebraska Heavyweight Championship (1 time)
- NWA Big Time Wrestling
  - NWA American Tag Team Championship (1 time) - with The Spoiler
  - NWA Brass Knuckles Championship (Texas version) (1 time)
- NWA Mid-America
  - NWA Tennessee Tag Team Championship (1 time) - with Spoiler
- World Wide Wrestling Federation
  - WWWF United States Tag Team Championship (1 time) - with Baron Mikel Scicluna
