= Tony Parisi (wrestler) =

Canadian professional and amateur wrestler (1941-2000)

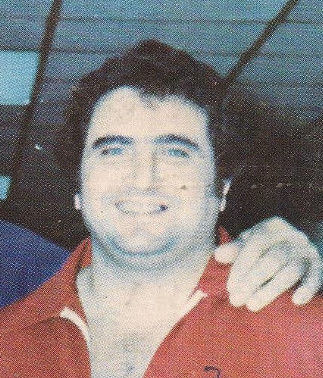
- Parisi, c. 1976

Personal information
- Born: Antonio Pugliese; January 22, 1941 Cosenza, Calabria, Italy
- Died: August 19, 2000 (aged 59) Niagara Falls, Ontario, Canada
- Spouse: Chiara Vaccaro (m. 1968)
- Children: 1
- Family: Johnny Swinger (nephew)

Professional wrestling career
- Ring name(s): Antonio Pugliese; Parisi; Tony Parisa; Tony Pug
- Billed height: 5 ft 11 in (180 cm)
- Billed weight: 241 lb (109 kg)
- Trained by: Bert Ruby; Harry Light
- Debut: 1961
- Retired: 1997

Antonio Pugliese (January 22, 1941 – August 19, 2000), better known by his ring name, Tony Parisi, was an Italian-Canadian professional wrestler. He won tag team championships in several professional wrestling promotions, including the World Wide Wrestling Federation (WWWF). With Louis Cerdan, he held the WWWF World Tag Team Championship from 1975 to 1976. As a singles wrestler, he also won the WWF International Heavyweight Championship. After retiring from wrestling, Pugliese continued to work in the industry and also operated a hotel and restaurant. He died in 2000 from an aneurysm.

== Professional wrestling career ==
=== Early career (1961–1966) ===
Pugliese made his professional wrestling debut in Detroit, Michigan in 1961. He soon began competing in Canada, where he was a popular babyface (fan favorite) wrestler. In one of his first matches, he faced Gino Brito, who later became his long-time tag team partner. Pugliese and Brito moved to Nashville, Tennessee in 1962 to wrestle in a promotion operated by Nick Gulas; they won the promotion's tag team title within two weeks of their arrival. Throughout his career, Pugliese formed many tag teams in various promotions with other wrestlers of Italian descent, including Dominic DeNucci, Tony Marino, and Bruno Sammartino.

Although Pugliese often wrestled in Ontario throughout his career, he also competed as far away as Australia and Japan.

Pugliese also wrestled as a heel (villain) at times. He competed as "Tenor" Parisi; in this gimmick, he wore a white tuxedo and sang opera to anger the crowd.

=== World Wide Wrestling Federation (1966–1969) ===
In 1966, Pugliese began wrestling for the World Wide Wrestling Federation (WWWF), where he was billed as the cousin of Bruno Sammartino. In this role, he was targeted by several heel wrestlers, who wanted to start feuds with the Sammartino family. On February 21, 1966, Pugliese teamed with Johnny Valentine to win the WWWF United States Tag Team Championship from Dan Miller and Dr. Bill Miller. They held the title belts for seven months before dropping them to the team of Baron Mikel Scicluna and Smasher Sloan on September 22. In this match, Valentine turned on Pugliese by awarding the championship to their opponents when Pugliese was injured.

Pugliese teamed with Miguel Pérez to challenge Scicluna and Sloan for the title on December 8, but Pérez sustained an injury during the match and was replaced by Spiros Arion. Pugliese and Arion won the match and the title; they held the belts for six months until June 1967. The team split up when Pugliese left the country briefly and Arnold Skaaland was named as co-holder of the championship in his place.

He returned to WWWF in 1968 where he teamed with fellow Italian Dominic DeNucci. Also he worked in Pittsburgh for Studio Wrestling. In 1969 scored victories over heels Toru Tanaka, Luke Graham, George Steele and Baron Mikel Scicluna. During that year he teamed with Victor Riviera and Haystacks Calhoun. By the end of 1969 Pugliese left WWWF.

=== Traveling wrestler (1967–1975) ===
In December 1967, Pugliese teamed with Pedro Morales in the California-based Worldwide Wrestling Associates (WWA). They won the WWA World Tag Team Championship by defeating Buddy Austin and Freddie Blassie. While defending the title, Pugliese also returned to the WWWF and began competing for the World Championship Wrestling in Australia. He teamed with Mario Milano to win the IWA World Tag Team Championship in April 1968. The team lost the belts to Skull Murphy and Killer Karl Kox in May, but Pugliese joined up with Dominic DeNucci to regain the title later that month. Although they dropped the title to Killer Kowalski and Bill Miller in June, Pugliese found a new partner in Don Leo Jonathan to regain the title on February 21, 1969. Two weeks later, The Spoiler and Pugliese's former partner Mario Milano (who had turned on Pugliese in the middle of a tag match with Spoiler and Kox to join their manager, Gary Hart) won the belts, but Pugliese and Jonathan regained them in a rematch later that month. Returning to the United States, Pugliese formed another tag team in Big Time Wrestling, a Texas-based division of the National Wrestling Alliance (NWA). He teamed with Wahoo McDaniel to win the NWA Texas Tag Team Championship. Records from the time period in this promotion are unclear about the dates and title lineage, but there is a record of Pugliese and McDaniel holding the belts in 1969. The following year, Pugliese held the IWA World Tag Team Championship for the final time, as he teamed with Mark Lewin to win the belts from Rip Hawk and Swede Hanson on May 15, 1970. They defended the title for just over a month before losing it to Kurt and Karl Von Steiger.

Pugliese then joined the Buffalo, New York-based National Wrestling Federation (NWF). Once again, he found success teaming with Dominic DeNucci. The pair competed in a tournament for the vacant NWF World Tag Team Championship in January 1972; they made it to the final round but lost to the team of Mitsu Arakawa and Yoshino Sato. Pugliese and DeNucci continued to challenge for the title, and they defeated Arakawa and Sato in March to win the belts. They dropped the belts to Don and Johnny Fargo in May but regained them in a rematch the same month. Later that month, however, the Fargos regained the belts. Pugliese and DeNucci were unable to regain them, but Pugliese teamed up with Luis Martinez to win the title in December. Records are unclear as to whom they won the belts from and how they lost them.

In 1973, he participated in the first annual Champion Carnival tournament promoted by All Japan Pro Wrestling. He lost in the first round to Hiro Matsuda.

Pugliese and DeNucci next traveled to Florida, where they competed for Championship Wrestling from Florida, an NWA territory. They defeated Toru Tanaka and Dick Slater to win the NWA Florida Tag Team Championship in December 1974. Slater teamed with Johnny Weaver to win the belts back from Pugliese and DeNucci, however in February 1975.

=== Return to the WWWF (1974–1976) ===
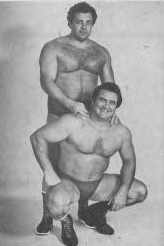
Parisi (bottom) and Gino Brito (top), c. 1983

Pugliese's next major success came in the WWWF, where he had been wrestling sporadically since 1970 under the ring name Tony Parisi. He teamed with Gino Brito, who was wrestling as Louis Cerdan, to win the WWWF World Tag Team Championship on November 18, 1975. They defeated The Blackjacks (Blackjack Mulligan and Blackjack Lanza) to win the belts and held them for over six months. They eventually dropped the titles in a match against The Executioners (a team composed of Killer Kowalski and Big John Studd, who wore masks to hide their identities) on May 11, 1976. Also in 1976, Parisi teamed with champion Bruno Sammartino (who was billed as Parisi's cousin) in Madison Square Garden to defeat Ivan Koloff and Superstar Billy Graham. Pugliese left the WWWF in 1976.

=== Georgia, Toronto, Detroit and New Japan (1976–1984) ===
After leaving the WWWF in 1976, Pugliese worked for Georgia Championship Wrestling. During this time, he mainly worked for Toronto's Maple Leaf Wrestling and Detroit's Big Time Wrestling into the 1980s. In 1983, he worked for New Japan Pro-Wrestling where he teamed with Adrian Adonis and Bob Orton Jr.

=== World Wrestling Federation (1982–1986) ===
When the promotion (which had since been renamed the World Wrestling Federation) decided to reactivate the WWF International Heavyweight Championship in 1982, Parisi became the new champion. He lost the belt to his former partner, Gino Brito, that August. Parisi continued working for the WWF when they come to shows in Buffalo, Rochester, Toronto and Ontario. In 1984 when WWF bought Maple Leaf Wrestling in Toronto, Parisi was under contract with them. He defeated Rene Goulet on television for WWF Prime Time Wrestling on October 13, 1985 taped in Toronto. In 1986 he defeated Rene Goulet, Steve Lombardi, and Barry O on house shows. He would lose to Nikolai Volkoff, Jim Neidhart, and Don Muraco. Parisi would leave WWF.

=== Lutte Internationale (1982–1986) ===
Much of Pugliese's later career was spent wrestling as Tony Parisi in the Montreal-based Lutte Internationale (also known as International Wrestling). He traveled throughout the province, competing primarily as a tag team wrestler. In 1982, he teamed with Gino Brito to win the Canadian International Tag Team Championship from Gilles Poisson and Sailor White. Although they dropped the title to Pierre Lefebvre and Michel Dubois, they were able to regain the belts the following January from Lefebvre and Pat Patterson. Lefebvre teamed with Billy Robinson to win the title back, but Parisi and Brito won the title for the third time on December 12, 1983 from then-champions Lefebvre and Patterson. Once again, Lefebvre took on a new partner, this time Frenchy Martin, to win the belts from Parisi and Brito the following month. Parisi's final reign with the title began on February 20, 1984, when he joined up with Dino Bravo to regain the belts. Their title reign lasted for several months before Lefebvre and Martin defeated Parisi and Bravo to win back the championship.

In 1985 WWF bought Lutte and continued to work in Montreal, New York state, and Ontario. He would team up with Brito's son Gino Jr. By the end of 1986, Parisi retired from the sport.

=== Later career (1994–1997) ===
In 1994, Parisi came out of retirement where he teamed with The Missing Link to defeat Joe E. Legend and Danny Johnson.

On June 7, 1996, he reunited with former partner Dominic DeNucci at World Championship Wrestling (WCW)'s Ilio DiPaolo Memorial Show where they defeated Danny Johnson and Bruiser Bedlam when Parisi pinned Johnson.

In 1997, Parisi had his last match at the second Ilio DiPaolo tribute show promoted by WCW. He reunited with Brito in a tag team match, and they defeated Greg Valentine and Terry Funk by disqualification.

=== Legacy ===
Pugliese promoted wrestling shows in Niagara Falls after retiring from the sport. He also ran an annual wrestling show at the CHIN Picnic in Toronto.

Pugliese is credited as the inspiration behind George "The Animal" Steele's gimmick of eating turnbuckle padding in the ring. A wrestler, who Steele believes was Pugliese, jokingly suggested the idea to Steele, who became well known for his fondness for turnbuckles.

== Personal life ==
Born in Italy, Pugliese moved to Thunder Bay, Ontario, when he was nine years old, then soon to Niagara Falls, Ontario. He joined the YMCA in Niagara Falls and began amateur wrestling at the age of 16. He enjoyed listening to opera music and once referred to his LP albums as his "prize possessions".

Pugliese met Chiara Vaccaro in Niagara Falls, and the couple married in 1968. They had a daughter named Ida in 1976. He operated the Niagara Family Inn and Big Anthony's Restaurant in Niagara Falls with his family until he died from an aneurysm on August 19, 2000.

He was related to Joseph Dorgan, who has wrestled under his relative's name as Johnny Parisi and is better known as Johnny Swinger.

== Championships and accomplishments ==
- Big Time Wrestling
  - NWA Texas Tag Team Championship (1 time) - with Wahoo McDaniel
- Championship Wrestling from Florida
  - NWA Florida Tag Team Championship (1 time) - with Dominic DeNucci
- Lutte Internationale
  - Canadian International Tag Team Championship (4 times) - with Gino Brito (3) and Dino Bravo (1)
- National Wrestling Federation
  - NWF World Tag Team Championship (3 times) - with Dominic DeNucci (2) and Luis Martinez (1)
- World Championship Wrestling (Australia)
  - IWA World Tag Team Championship (5 times) - with Mario Milano (1), Dominic DeNucci (1), Don Leo Jonathan (2), and Mark Lewin (1)
- Worldwide Wrestling Associates
  - WWA World Tag Team Championship (1 time) - with Pedro Morales
- World Wide Wrestling Federation / World Wrestling Federation
  - WWF International Heavyweight Championship (1 time)
  - WWWF United States Tag Team Championship (2 times) - with Johnny Valentine (1) and Spiros Arion (1)
  - WWWF World Tag Team Championship (1 time) - with Louis Cerdan
