= Tony Altomare =

American professional wrestler, trainer, manager (1928–2003)

Personal information
- Born: Anthony C. Altomare; July 24, 1928 Stamford, Connecticut, US
- Died: February 18, 2003 (aged 74) Stamford, Connecticut, US
- Children: 2

Professional wrestling career
- Ring name(s): Tony Altomare; The Stamford Stomper
- Debut: 1960
- Retired: 1983

Anthony C. Altomare (Note: Surname is occasionally misspelled Altimore, Altomore, or Altomaro.) (July 24, 1928 – February 18, 2003) was an American professional wrestler, trainer, and marketer. He is perhaps best known as one half of the tag team "The Sicilians" with Lou Albano, from his debut in 1960 to 1970.

== Early life ==
Altomare was born on July 24, 1928, in Stamford, Connecticut, to Frank and Pauline Altomare (née Vescio). He was the oldest of four children: brothers Peter and Robert and sister Madeline. At the age of 18, Altomare enlisted in the United States Army's 82nd Airborne Division, where he served for two years. It was during this time that his mother died, and he became something of a parent to his youngest brother Robert, who was only three at the time. Anthony and Peter later joined by Robert, became lifeguards for Stamford's West Beach, where he would eventually rise to become the city's chief lifeguard for a 25-year tenure. During this time, he instituted free swimming lessons to the public and saved at least several lives. He married Mollie Gawitt of Stamford, and had two children.

Altomare's work as a lifeguard led to a career in entertainment. He appeared in 1964's The Horror of Party Beach, which was shot at West Beach. More importantly, he was recruited into the world of professional wrestling by a promoter who noted his impressive physique.

== Professional wrestling career ==
As a wrestler, Altomare was paired with Lou Albano, another Italian, in a stereotypical Italian gangster duo known as "The Sicilians." The pair won the Midwest tag team championship on the undercard of the June 30, 1961 Comiskey Park event starring Pat O'Connor and Buddy Rogers that set the all-time record gate in the United States to that point. Their realistic depiction of gangster characters caught the attention of actual mafiosi in 1961. In Chicago, Tony Accardo and two associates "requested" that Albano and Altomare cease using the word "mafia." During their run as Midwest tag team champions, personal differences with bookers and other wrestlers resulted in the pair abandoning the territory quickly enough that they did not lose the title before leaving. In July 1967, they won the WWWF United States Tag Team Championship from Arnold Skaaland and Spiros Arion. Albano and Altomare held the championship for two weeks.

After Albano became a manager in 1970, Altomare continued as a singles wrestler, until retiring sometime before 1979. He then worked as a road agent and referee. In 1979, Vince McMahon, Sr. assigned Altomare to be the chaperone of a new and unruly wrestler named Hulk Hogan. Altomare befriended Hogan and thus frequently let Hogan do as he please, including partying and drinking before matches. Nonetheless, Altomare taught Hogan the basics of the wrestling business, in and outside the ring, and in his autobiography, Hogan called Altomare's appointment as his chaperone "one of the best gifts McMahon ever gave me."

In 1980, Altomare filled in for Afa in a three-on-three match alongside Sika and his old partner, Lou Albano, ten years after the breakup of The Sicilians. The two remained friends for life.

Later, Altomare was promoted to a low-level executive position within Vince McMahon, Jr.'s new WWF promotion. He was responsible for ensuring the arrival and sale of WWF-branded merchandise at wrestling shows. In 1984, he opened a wrestling school in Orange, Connecticut, called "The Factory," where he trained later superstars such as Ted Arcidi, Paul Roma, Steve Blackman, Rita Chatterton, and Doc Butler and established a training relationship with Curtis Sliwa and the Guardian Angels.

== Death ==
Tony Altomare died in Stamford of heart failure on February 18, 2003, at the age of 74. He was buried in Spring Grove cemetery in Darien, Connecticut.

== Championships and accomplishments ==
- Fred Kohler Enterprises
  - Midwest Tag Team Championship (1 time) – with Captain Lou Albano
- World Wide Wrestling Federation
  - WWWF United States Tag Team Championship (1 time) – with Captain Lou Albano
