= WWWF United States Tag Team Championship =

Professional wrestling championship

Details
- Promotion: Capitol Wrestling Corporation; World Wide Wrestling Federation
- Date established: July 1958
- Date retired: July 29, 1967

Other name
- NWA United States Tag Team Championship (Northeast)
Statistics
- First champions: Mark Lewin and Don Curtis
- Final champions: Bruno Sammartino and Spiros Arion
- Most reigns: As tag team (4 reigns): The Golden Grahams (Eddie Graham and Dr. Jerry Graham); As individual (6 reigns): Dr. Jerry Graham
- Longest reign: The Fabulous Kangaroos (Al Costello and Roy Heffernan) (3rd reign, 399 days)
- Shortest reign: Bruno Sammartino and Spiros Arion (5 days) (Note: The Golden Grahams (Eddie Graham and Dr. Jerry Graham) possibly have the shortest reign at 2 days for their third reign, but the reign length is undeterminable, lasting anywhere from 2 days to 32 days.)

The WWWF United States Tag Team Championship was the first version of the main tag team title in the World Wide Wrestling Federation from 1963 until 1967. Originally, the WWWF was a member of the National Wrestling Alliance operating out of the Northeast and was called the Capitol Wrestling Corporation. The championship began as Capitol Wrestling's territorial version of the NWA United States Tag Team Championship from 1958 until 1963.

== Reigns ==
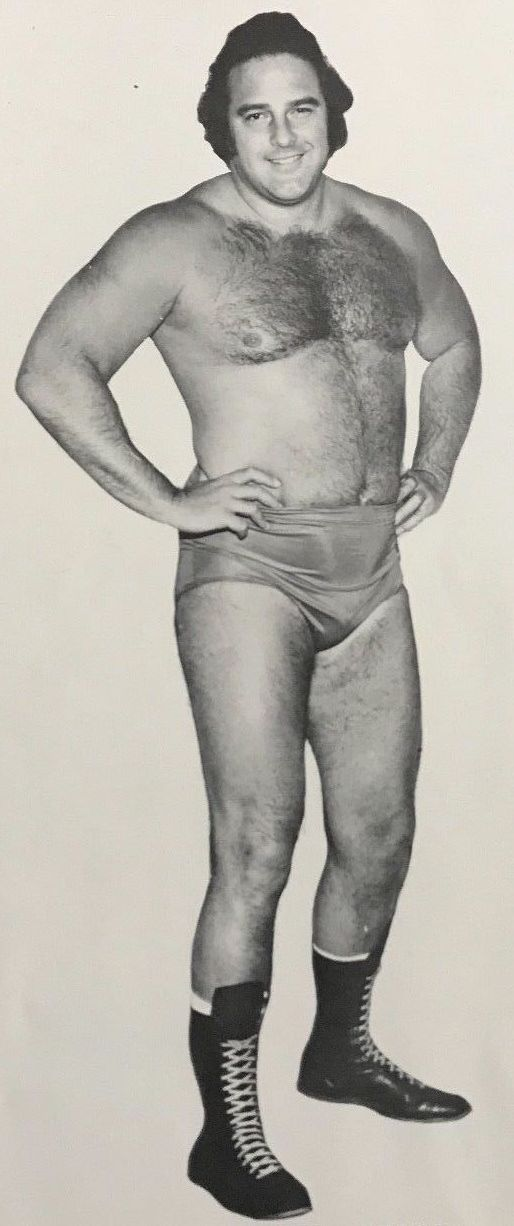
Don Curtis and Mark Lewin, the inaugural holders of the WWWF United States Tag Team Championship, at the time known as a version of the NWA United States Tag Team Championship.

Over the championship's nine-year history, there were 31 reigns between 23 teams composed of 36 individual champions and one vacancy. Don Curtis and Mark Lewin were the inaugural champions, while Bruno Sammartino and Spiros Arion were the final. As a team, The Golden Grahams (Eddie Graham and Dr. Jerry Graham) have the most reigns at four, while individually, Jerry has the most reigns at six. The Fabulous Kangaroos (Al Costello and Roy Heffernan) had the longest reign at 399 days for their third reign, while Sammartino and Arion have the shortest determinable reign at 5 days; The Golden Grahams possibly have the shortest reign at 2 days for their third reign, but the reign length is undeterminable, lasting anywhere from 2 days to 32 days.

=== Names ===
Name	Years
NWA United States Tag Team Championship (Northeast version)	July 1, 1958 – April 1963
WWWF United States Tag Team Championship	April 1963 – July 30, 1967

Key
No.	Overall reign number
Reign	Reign number for the specific team—reign numbers for the individuals are in parentheses, if different
Days	Number of days held

No.	Champion	Championship change			Reign statistics		Notes	Ref.
No.	Champion	Date	Event	Location	Reign	Days	Notes	Ref.
Capitol Wrestling Corporation (CWC)
1	Don Curtis and Mark Lewin	July 1, 1958	House show	Kansas City, MO	1	65 (Note: The exact date that Don Curtis and Mark Lewin won the championship is uncertain, which means the reign lasted between 35 and 65 days.)	Defeated Dick the Bruiser and Hans Schmidt in a tournament final to become the inaugural champions.	
2	The Golden Grahams (Eddie Graham and Dr. Jerry Graham)	September 4, 1958	House show	Washington, D.C.	1	98		
3	Don Curtis and Mark Lewin	December 11, 1958	House show	Washington, D.C.	2	167		
4	The Golden Grahams (Eddie Graham and Dr. Jerry Graham)	May 27, 1959	House show	Bridgeport, CT	2	66–96 (Note: The exact date the championship was vacated is uncertain, which means The Golder Grahams' second reign lasted between 66 and 96 days.)		
—	Vacated	August 1959	—	—	—	—	Championship was vacated when Eddie Graham left the promotion..	
5	Dr. Jerry Graham (3) and Johnny Valentine	November 14, 1959	House show	West Hempstead, NY	1	108–138 (Note: The exact date that Dr. Jerry Graham and Johnny Valentine's championship reign ended is uncertain, which means that the reign lasted between 108 and 138 days.)	Defeated Don Curtis and Mark Lewin to win the vacant championship.	
6	The Golden Grahams (Dr. Jerry Graham (4) and Eddie Graham)	March 1960	House show	New Haven, CT	3	2–32 (Note: The exact date where The Golden Grahams won the championship is uncertain, which means that the championship reign lasted between 2 and 32 days.)	Eddie Graham returned and took over Johnny Valentine's half of the championship.	
7	The Bastiens Brothers (Lou Bastien and Red Bastien)	April 2, 1960	House show	New Haven, CT	1	14		
8	The Golden Grahams (Eddie and Dr. Jerry Graham (5))	April 16, 1960	House show	New Haven, CT	4	7		
9	The Bastiens Brothers (Lou Bastien and Red Bastien)	April 23, 1960	House show	Chicago, IL	2	89		
10	The Fabulous Kangaroos (Al Costello and Roy Heffernan)	July 21, 1960	House show	Washington, D.C.	1	18		
11	The Bastiens Brothers (Lou Bastien and Red Bastien)	August 8, 1960	House show	Washington, D.C.	3	16		
12	The Fabulous Kangaroos (Al Costello and Roy Heffernan)	August 24, 1960	House show	Bridgeport, CT	2	87		
13	Buddy Rogers and Johnny Valentine (2)	November 19, 1960	House show	Teaneck, NJ	1	19		
14	The Fabulous Kangaroos (Al Costello and Roy Heffernan)	December 8, 1960	House show	Washington, D.C.	3	399	Defeated Chief Big Heart and Johnny Valentine to win the championship.	
15	“Cowboy” Bob Ellis and Johnny Valentine (3)	January 11, 1962	House show	Washington, D.C.	1	175		
16	Buddy Rogers (2) and Johnny Barend	July 5, 1962	Washington DC TV	Washington, D.C.	1	245		
World Wide Wrestling Federation (WWWF)
17	Buddy Austin and The Great Scott	March 7, 1963	Washington DC TV	Washington, D.C.	1	70	The Championship was renamed the WWWF United States Tag Team Championship in April 1963	
18	Brute Bernard and Skull Murphy	May 16, 1963	Washington DC TV	Washington, D.C.	1	182		
19	Gorilla Monsoon and Killer Kowalski	November 14, 1963	Washington DC TV	Washington, D.C.	1	44		
20	The Tolos Brothers (John Tolos and Chris Tolos)	December 28, 1963	House show	Teaneck, NJ	1	35–62 (Note: The exact date that the Tolos Brothers lost the championship is uncertain, which means that the reign lasted between 35 and 62 days.)		
21	Don McClarity and Vittorio Apollo	February 1964	House show	New Haven, CT	1	21–48 (Note: The exact date that Don McLarity and Vittorio Apollo won the championship is uncertain, which means that the reign lasted between 21 and 48 days.)		
22	Dr. Jerry Graham (6) and Luke Graham	March 20, 1964	House show	New Haven, CT	1	321		
23	Gene Kiniski and Waldo Von Erich	February 4, 1965	Washington DC TV	Washington, D.C.	1	63		
24	Bill Watts and Gorilla Monsoon (2)	April 8, 1965	Washington DC TV	Washington, D.C.	1	119		
25	The Miller Brothers (Bill Miller and Dan Miller (wrestler))	August 5, 1965	Washington DC TV	Washington, D.C.	1	200		
26	Antonio Pugliese and Johnny Valentine (4)	February 21, 1966	House show	New York City, NY	1	213		
27	Baron Mikel Scicluna and Smasher Sloan	September 22, 1966	Washington DC TV	Washington, D.C.	1	77	This was a two-out-of-three falls match. Scicluna and Smasher Sloan were given the belts by heel-turned Antonio Pugliese when Johnny Valentine was injured in the second fall after winning the first fall.	
28	Antonio Pugliese (2) and Spiros Arion	December 8, 1966	Washington DC TV	Washington, D.C.	1	175–204 (Note: The exact date that Antonio Pugliese and Spiros Arion's reign ended is uncertain, which means that the championship reign lasted between 175 and 204 days.)		
29	Arnold Skaaland and Spiros Arion (2)	June 1966	House show	Atlantic City, NJ	1	10–39 (Note: The exact date that Arnold Skaaland and Arion became champions is uncertain, which means that the championship reign lasted between 375 and 404 days.)	Antonio Pugliese left the WWWF and Skaaland was awarded half of the title.	
30	The Sicilians (Lou Albano and Tony Altimore)	July 10, 1967	House show	Atlantic City, NJ	1	14	Defeated Arnold Skaaland and Chuck Richards to win the championship.	
31	Bruno Sammartino and Spiros Arion (3)	July 24, 1967	House show	Atlantic City, NJ	1	5		
—	Deactivated	July 29, 1967	—	—	—	—	Bruno Sammartino was also the WWWF champion and thus unable to defend both championships.	

== Combined reigns ==
=== By team ===
¤	The exact length of at least one title reign is uncertain, so the shortest possible length is used.

Rank	Team	No. of reigns	Combined days
1	The Fabulous Kangaroos (Al Costello and Roy Heffernan)	3	514
2	Dr. Jerry Graham and Luke Graham	1	321
3	Buddy Rogers and Johnny Barend	1	245
4	Mark Lewin and Don Curtis	2	232
5	Antonio Pugliese and Johnny Valentine	1	213
6	Dr. Bill Miller and Dan Miller	1	200
7	Skull Murphy and Brute Bernard	1	182
8	Johnny Valentine and Bob Ellis	1	175
8	Spiros Arion and Antonio Pugliese	1	175¤
10	The Grahams (Jerry and Eddie)	4	173¤
11	The Bastiens (Red and Lou)	3	119
11	Gorilla Monsoon and Bill Watts	1	119
13	Jerry Graham and Johnny Valentine	1	108¤
14	Baron Mikel Scicluna and Smasher Sloan	1	77
15	Buddy Austin and Great Scott	1	70
16	Gene Kiniski and Waldo Von Erich	1	63
17	Killer Kowalski and Gorilla Monsoon	1	44
18	The Tolos Brothers (John and Chris)	1	35¤
19	Don McClarity and Vittorio Apollo	1	21¤
20	The Sicilians (Lou Albano and Tony Altimore)	1	14
21	Spiros Arion and Arnold Skaaland	1	10¤
22	Johnny Valentine and Buddy Rogers	1	9
23	Bruno Sammartino and Spiros Arion	1	5

=== By wrestler ===
Rank	Wrestler	No. of reigns	Combined days
1	Dr. Jerry Graham	6	632¤
2	Al Costello	3	514
2	Roy Heffernan	3	514
4	Johnny Valentine	4	505¤
5	Antonio Pugliese	2	388¤
6	Luke Graham	1	321
7	Buddy Rogers	2	254
8	Johnny Barend	1	245
9	Mark Lewin	2	232
9	Don Curtis	2	232
11	Spiros Arion	3	219¤
12	Dan Miller	1	200
12	Dr. Bill Miller	1	200
14	Skull Murphy	1	182
14	Brute Bernard	1	182
16	Bob Ellis	1	175
17	Eddie Graham	4	171¤
18	Gorilla Monsoon	2	163
19	Red Bastien	3	119
19	Lou Bastien	3	119
19	Bill Watts	1	119
22	Baron Mikel Scicluna	1	77
22	Smasher Sloan	1	77
24	Buddy Austin	1	70
24	Great Scott	1	70
26	Gene Kiniski	1	63
26	Waldo Von Erich	1	63
28	Killer Kowalski	1	44
29	John Tolos	1	35¤
29	Chris Tolos	1	35¤
31	Don McClarity	1	21¤
31	Vittorio Apollo	1	21¤
33	Lou Albano	1	14
33	Tony Altimore	1	14
35	Arnold Skaaland	1	10¤
36	Bruno Sammartino	1	5

== See also ==
- List of former championships in WWE
- Tag team championships in WWE
- Professional wrestling in the United States
