= Don McClarty =

Irish professional wrestler

Personal information
- Born: Donald Leeds Ireland

Professional wrestling career
- Ring name(s): Don McClarty; Don McClarity; Don Leeds; Ray McClarity
- Billed height: 6 ft 4 in (1.93 m)
- Billed weight: 260 lb (120 kg)
- Debut: 1955
- Retired: 1969

Donald Leeds was an Irish professional wrestler known as Don McClarty.

== Career ==
Leeds made his debut in professional wrestling in 1955. During most of his career he worked in Montreal, Toronto, Minneapolis, St. Louis, Charlotte, New York City and Vancouver.

In 1964, while working for World Wide Wrestling Federation he won the WWWF United States Tag Team Championship with Argentina Apollo. He stayed with the WWWF until 1965.

He retired from wrestling in 1969.

== Championships and accomplishments ==
- Heart of America Sports Attractions
  - NWA Central States Tag Team Championship (1 time) – with Buddy Austin
- NWA All-Star Wrestling
  - NWA Canadian Tag Team Championship (Vancouver version) (1 time) - with Roy McClarity
- NWA Western States Sports
  - NWA Western States Heavyweight Championship (2 times)
- World Wide Wrestling Federation
  - WWWF United States Tag Team Championship (1 time) - with Argentina Apollo
