= Dr. Jerry Graham =

American professional wrestler (1928–1997)

Personal information
- Born: Jerry Martin Matthews; December 16, 1928 Woodward, Oklahoma, U.S.
- Died: January 24, 1997 (aged 75) Glendale, California, U.S.
- Education: Phoenix College; Arizona State University

Professional wrestling career
- Ring name(s): Dr. Jerry Graham; Jerry Graham; Dr. Zombie
- Billed height: 5 ft 10 in (178 cm)
- Billed weight: 245 lb (111 kg)
- Billed from: Phoenix, Arizona
- Debut: 1947
- Retired: 1981
- Military service
- Allegiance: United States
- Branch: United States Army
- Service years: 1947-1948
- Rank: Private First Class
- Unit: 82nd Airborne Division

Jerry Martin Graham (born Jerry Martin Matthews, December 16, 1928 – January 24, 1997) better known as "Dr. Jerry Graham" was an American professional wrestler. He is best known for his time spent in the World Wide Wrestling Federation and as the founder of the Graham wrestling family.

== Early life ==
Graham was adopted by his stepfather Harold Graham and his name was legally changed. He was raised in Arizona. In June 1947, he enlisted in the United States Army, serving with the 82nd Airborne Division as a paratrooper and as a driver for General James M. Gavin. He became a private first class. After leaving the Army in 1948, he returned to Phoenix, where he attended Phoenix College and Arizona State University.

== Professional wrestling career ==
Graham began wrestling at the age of 14 in his hometown of Phoenix, Arizona, and won his first major title, the NWA Southern Heavyweight Championship, in December 1956. He was the founder of the storyline Graham wrestling family, which included Eddie Graham (Edward Gossett), "Crazy" Luke Graham (James Grady Johnson), "Superstar" Billy Graham (Wayne Coleman), Mike Graham (Mike Gossett), Jerry Graham Jr., Crazy Luke Graham Jr. (Donald J. Jolly), Mad Dog Steele Graham (Tom Hankins) and Gerry Chubby Graham (M. Gerald Sadler). Along with Eddie, Jerry sold out Madison Square Garden many times in the 1950s and late 1960s, when they were known as The Golden Grahams. After his tag team success, Dr. Graham brought "Crazy" Luke Graham and "Superstar" Billy Graham into the Graham family. He engaged in a feud with Buddy Rogers in 1956, predominantly in New York.

On November 19, 1957, Graham and Dick the Bruiser wrestled Antonio Rocca and Edouard Carpentier at Madison Square Garden. During the match, a major riot exploded and many fans were arrested, with eight police officers being injured from chairs that were thrown by fans. All of the wrestlers during the match were fined, and Dick the Bruiser was banned for life from wrestling in New York. He was a top contender for Bruno Sammartino's World Wide Wrestling Federation (WWWF) World Heavyweight Championship, wrestling him in three bouts at Madison Square Garden. The arena was so packed that more than 10,000 fans were turned away.

Despite coming up short in winning the world title, Graham held the WWWF United States Tag Team Championship six times; his first reign with Eddie Graham began in September 1958, when they defeated Mark Lewin and Don Curtis. They won the titles again in May 1959 until it was vacated due to Jerry suffering an injury. He also held it in November with Johnny Valentine until Eddie took his place the following year. This also included a reign with "brother" Crazy Luke Graham in March 1964. Graham also won the NWA Canadian Tag Team Championship with Abdullah the Butcher in October 1967. In 1970, he teamed with Superstar Billy Graham in Los Angeles.

He spent the 1970s training other wrestlers and occasionally wrestling himself. Graham unsuccessfully attempted a comeback to the now WWF in 1984, and spent the rest of his career as a manager on the independent circuit. Throughout his career, he suffered from injuries which included a broken nose, dislocated hip, back pain, and at least 300 stitches to his back.

Graham's final match took place in 1986 at the Grand Olympic Auditorium for All-Star California Championship Wrestling, challenging Victor Rivera for the CCW Heavyweight Championship. The match was stopped due to Graham's excessive bleeding. Pampero Firpo also returned that evening to professional wrestling, winning a 20-man battle royal.

== Personal life ==
Graham suffered from alcoholism and depression. In August 1969, when his mother died, he grabbed a shotgun from the back of his car and took his mother's corpse out of the Good Samaritan Hospital in Phoenix. After the incident, he spent time in the Arizona State Mental Hospital.

In "Superstar" Billy Graham's book Tangled Ropes, he speaks about the real life hatred that Graham had for Freddie Blassie.

== Death and legacy ==
Graham suffered from failing health in the mid-90s, causing him to enter a nursing home. On January 24, 1997, Graham died in Glendale at the age of 75, due to complications from a stroke six weeks earlier.

He was posthumously inducted into the WWE Hall of Fame as a part of the Legacy wing on March 31, 2017.

In the 2024 documentary miniseries Mr. McMahon, Vince McMahon named Graham as his favorite professional wrestler.

== Championships and accomplishments ==
- Capitol Wrestling Corporation / World Wide Wrestling Federation / WWE
  - NWA United States Tag Team Championship (Northeast version) (5 times) – with Eddie Graham (4), Johnny Valentine (1)
  - WWWF United States Tag Team Championship (1 time) – with Luke Graham
  - WWE Hall of Fame (Class of 2017)
- Gulf Coast Championship Wrestling
  - NWA Gulf Coast Heavyweight Championship (1 time)
- Maple Leaf Wrestling
  - NWA International Tag Team Championship (Toronto version) (1 time) – with Bulldog Brower
- Mid-South Sports
  - NWA Southern Heavyweight Championship (Georgia version) (2 times)
  - NWA World Tag Team Championship (Georgia version) (1 time) – with Don McIntyre
- NWA All-Star Wrestling
  - NWA Canadian Tag Team Championship (Vancouver version) (1 time) – with Abdullah the Butcher
  - NWA World Tag Team Championship (Vancouver version) (1 time) – with Abdullah the Butcher
- Stampede Wrestling
  - NWA International Tag Team Championship (Calgary version) (1 time) – with Jim Wright
- World Wrestling Association
  - WWA World Tag Team Championship (2 times) – with Don Kent
