= Eddie Graham =

American professional wrestler (1930–1985)

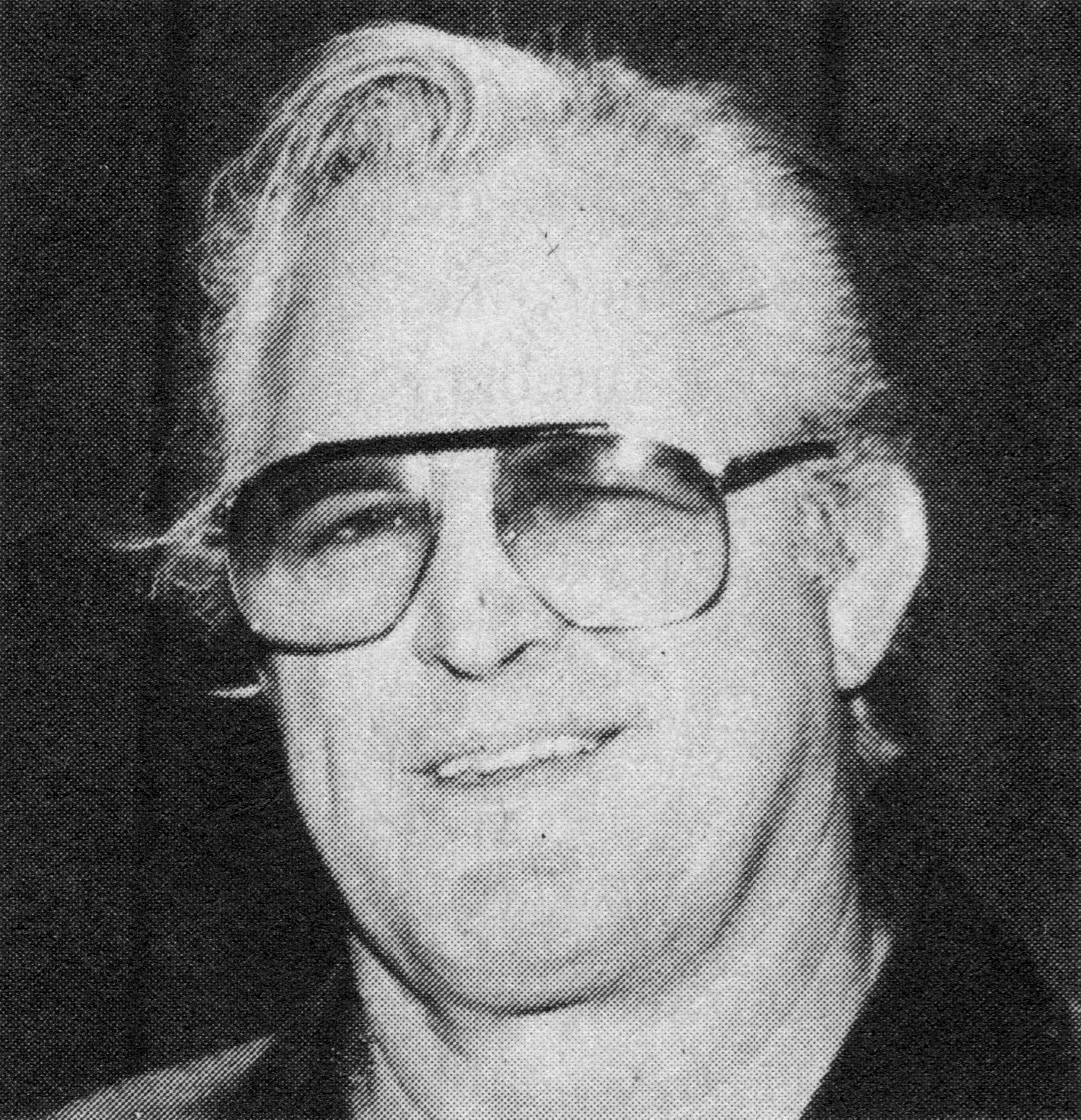

Personal information
- Born: Edward F. Gossett; January 15, 1930 Dayton, Tennessee, U.S.
- Died: January 21, 1985 (aged 55) Tampa, Florida, U.S.
- Cause of death: Suicide
- Spouse: Lucy Gossett
- Children: Mike Graham

Professional wrestling career
- Ring name(s): Eddie Gossett; Rip Rogers; Eddie Graham
- Billed height: 5 ft 11 in (1.80 m)
- Billed weight: 215 lb (98 kg)
- Trained by: Cowboy Luttrell
- Debut: 1947
- Retired: 1982

Edward F. Gossett (January 15, 1930 – January 21, 1985), better known by his ring name Eddie Graham, was an American professional wrestler, promoter, booker, and trainer.

He debuted in 1947, initially wrestling under the ring name Rip Rogers in Texas. In 1958, he adopted the ring name Eddie Graham upon joining Capitol Wrestling, where he teamed with Dr. Jerry Graham as his kayfabe brother, winning the NWA United States Tag Team Championship (Northeast version) four times. In 1960, Graham joined Championship Wrestling from Florida (CWF), where he won the NWA Southern Heavyweight Championship (Florida version) three times, the NWA World Tag Team Championship (Florida version) seven times, the NWA Brass Knuckles Championship (Florida version) twice, the NWA Florida Heavyweight Championship, and the NWA Florida Tag Team Championship. During the 1970s, Graham served as the promoter and booker for the CWF (a position he held until his death) and was President of the National Wrestling Alliance (NWA) from 1976 to 1978.

Graham died as a result of suicide on January 21, 1985, at the age of 55. He was posthumously inducted into the WCW Hall of Fame in 1993, the Wrestling Observer Newsletter Hall of Fame in 1996, the NWA Hall of Fame in 2006, the WWE Hall of Fame in 2008, and the Professional Wrestling Hall of Fame and Museum in 2018.

== Early life ==
Edward Gossett was born on January 15, 1930, blind in one eye, to Jess and Velma Louise Gossett in Dayton, Tennessee. His mother worked as a clerk in a dime store and in lunchrooms, and his dad was an itinerant laborer. He began working as a paperboy and delivered eggs in Chattanooga at the age of 12. However, his father regularly beat him and stole his earnings. The newspaper rewarded Gossett with a free membership to the YMCA, where he received physical training and was exposed to professional wrestling.

== Professional wrestling career ==
=== Early career (1947–1958) ===
Gossett, under his real name, wrestled his first match in 1947 against Lucky Gilpin at a benefit show run by local restaurateurs in Chattanooga. After the match, he was paid with a 25-lb turkey. In August 1950, he teamed with Roy Welch to win his first championship, the NWA Southern Tag Team Championship (Mid-America version), which they held again in December. He briefly stopped wrestling in February 1951 to join the United States Army, before being released in September after it was discovered he was blind in one eye.

In 1956, Gossett adopted the persona of Rip Rogers, the kayfabe brother of "Nature Boy" Buddy Rogers. On April 22, 1958, he and Johnny Valentine defeated Alberto and Enrique Torres for the NWA Texas Tag Team Championship. They lost the titles on May 23 to Larry Chene and Pepper Gomez, who subsequently defeated Rogers in a loser leaves town match, forcing him to leave Texas.

=== Capitol Wrestling / World Wide Wrestling Federation (1958–1961, 1964–1973) ===
In June 1958, Gossett began working for Vincent J. McMahon's promotion, Capitol Wrestling (the forerunner of WWE), where he changed his ring name to Eddie Graham and was billed as the kayfabe brother of Dr. Jerry Graham. Known collectively as the "Golden Grahams", they were a successful villainous tag team on the east coast of the United States, main eventing six shows in Madison Square Garden against Antonino Rocca and Miguel Pérez. They held the NWA United States Tag Team Championship (Northeast version) on four occasions from September 1958 to April 1960, winning the belts three times in victories over Don Curtis and Mark Lewin, and once against the Bastien Brothers (Red and Lou Bastien). He continued to wrestle for Capitol Wrestling until December 1961.

Graham reunited with Jerry in Calgary in 1962, and he briefly returned to the World Wide Wrestling Federation (WWWF, formerly Capitol Wrestling) in 1964 to team with him. After twice unsuccessfully challenging Gene Kiniski and Waldo von Erich for the NWA United States Tag Team Championship in February 1965, the two quit teaming and Graham's appearances for the WWWF became increasingly sporadic. He made his final appearance on February 26, 1973, facing Verne Gagne for the AWA World Heavyweight Championship in a losing effort.

=== Championship Wrestling from Florida (1960–1985) ===
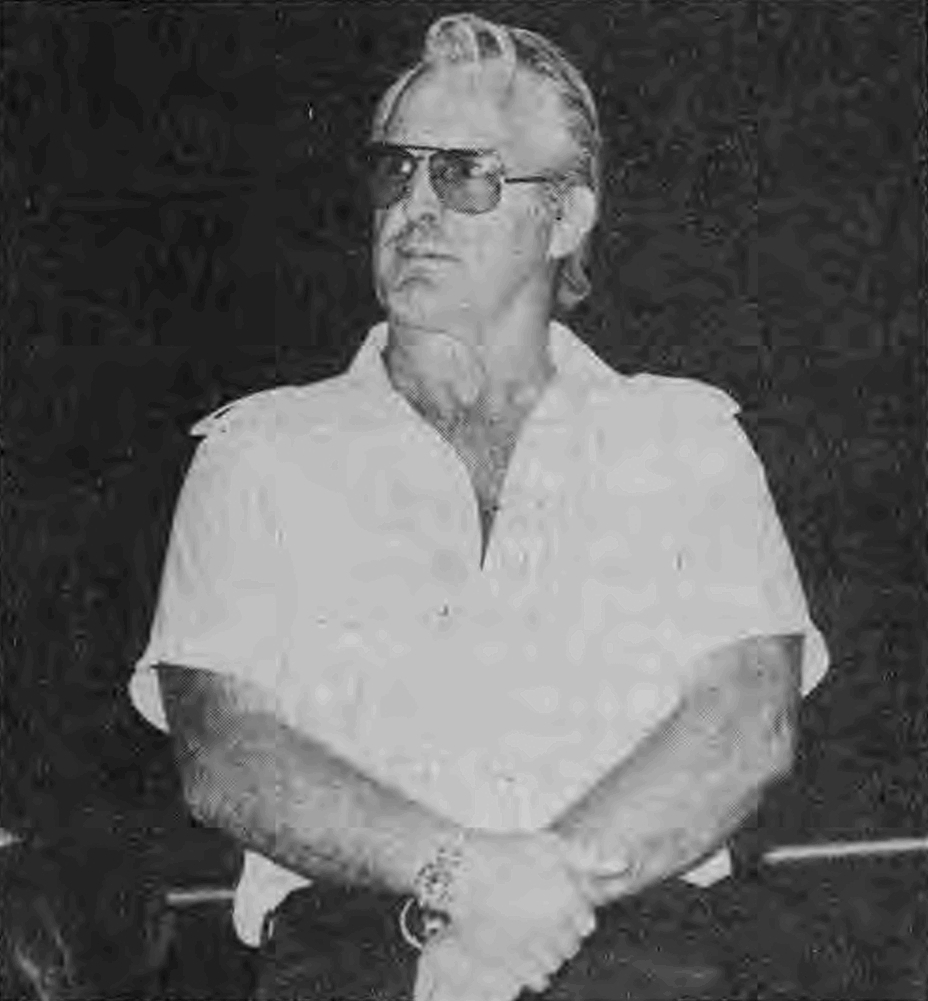
Graham standing in the ring during a CWF show

Graham, who split his time between Capitol Wrestling and Florida, relocated to Florida full-time in 1960 to wrestle for Championship Wrestling from Florida (CWF). He was cast as a top babyface and briefly teamed with Hans Schmidt until he turned on Graham in late 1961.

On March 17, 1962, Graham won a tournament to become the inaugural NWA Southern Heavyweight Champion, but vacated the title on May 24 due to an injury caused from an attack by Boris Malenko, leading to a feud between the two. He regained the title from Malenko on November 29, and won it once more from Hiro Matsuda on August 1, 1963. From August 1961 to July 1967, he held the NWA World Tag Team Championship (Florida version) seven times with the likes of Ike Eakins, Sam Steamboat, Bob Orton and José Lothario. Their feud intensified in an angle where Graham saved Steamboat from an attack by Malenko, who attempted to bite off Steamboat's ear, stomping out Malenko's false teeth. This led to a series of Russian Chain matches between the two. It also grew to involve the NWA Brass Knuckles Championship (Florida version), which Graham won from Johnny Valentine on June 10, 1968, only to lose it to Malenko on July 4. On October 8, Graham was lacing his boots in the locker room at the Fort Homer W. Hesterly Armory when a 75-lb steel window fell on his head, detaching both of his retinas and causing him an injury that required more than three hundred stitches. The Florida Legislature awarded him $23,399 for the incident, which sidelined him for fifteen months.

In 1971, Graham and Malenko ended their feud when Malenko turned face and offered him $5,000 to be his partner in a feud with Dick Murdoch and Rene Goulet. During this time, Graham began teaming with his son, Mike. On December 29, 1972, they defeated Rocket and Sputnik Monroe to win the NWA Georgia Tag Team Championship, but lost the titles in May 1973 to the Super Infernos (Doug Gilbert and Don Smith). They also held the NWA Florida Tag Team Championship in 1976. Graham officially retired from in-ring competition in 1980. However, he wrestled two more matches in 1982. On February 14, Graham defeated Terry Funk, and on March 3, their rematch ended in a draw.

In September 1970, Graham took over booking and promoting for the CWF. He also trained several wrestlers, including his son Mike, Bob Orton Jr., Bob Roop, Hulk Hogan, Paul Orndorff, and Steve Keirn. In August 1976, Graham was elected as the President of the National Wrestling Alliance (NWA) during a press conference in Lake Tahoe. He was responsible for promoting the inaugural NWA vs. WWWF Championship unification match between NWA World Heavyweight Champion Harley Race and WWWF World Heavyweight Champion "Superstar" Billy Graham in 1978. Graham was forced to step down as President in April 1978 due to health issues. Two years later, he bought half interest in the Orlando Sports Stadium, which he renamed the Eddie Graham Sports Stadium.

=== Japan (1966–1974) ===
Graham made his first trip to Japan in May 1966 for the Japan Wrestling Association (JWA). On June 27, Graham and Killer Karl Kox defeated Hiro Matsuda and Yoshimura Michiaki to win the All Asia Tag Team Championship. Four days later, on July 1, they lost the titles to Giant Baba and Michiaki. In January 1967, he wrestled for the International Wrestling Enterprise (IWE) as part of its "Pioneer Series" tour. Graham did not appear for another Japanese promotion until February 1974, as part of All Japan Pro Wrestling's (AJPW) "Excite Series" tour, where he remained until March.

== Personal life ==
Gossett met his wife, Lucille, in 1949, and they married on December 24, 1950. He was an accomplished pilot and learned how to fly a plane by reading books in the back seat of cars on the way to his matches.

In July 1958, Gossett and his tag team partner, Dr. Jerry Graham, were arrested on concealed weapons charges in Wilmington, Delaware, after authorities found a .22-caliber pistol in Gossett's car and a .45 automatic in Jerry's car. The charges were dismissed after $7 was paid in court costs.

Gossett made contributions to a number of charitable causes. In 1957, he, alongside Clarence “Cowboy” Luttrall and R. Ed Blackburn Jr., began efforts to establish the Florida Sheriff's Boys Ranch. Over $500,000 produced from every match promoted by Championship Wrestling from Florida went to the Boys Ranch and Girls Villa. He served on its board of directors for ten years. In 1963, he was given an Achievement Award from the Tampa Police Athletic League for his work with kids. In 1977, he donated $10,000 to the University of Florida for a wrestling room that was named after him. The following year, he was named Sportsman of the Year by the Tampa Sports Club. In 1980, Graham was awarded an American flag that had flown over the White House by Senator Richard Stone. After hosting a birthday roast in January 1981, the proceeds went to the Leukemia Society of America.

== Death and legacy ==
On January 20, 1985, Gossett shot himself in the right temple with a .38-caliber Smith & Wesson revolver at his Tampa home, 2410 S. Dundee, in a suicide attempt. He was found in bed by Lucille, whom he had told he was not feeling well. Gossett was taken to St. Joseph's Hospital at 12:15 P.M., and was pronounced dead the next day at 10:03 A.M., aged 55. He had been suffering from alcoholism and depression, which was believed to have been caused by financial issues stemming from "questionable dealings in real estate". His son Mike and grandson Stephen committed suicide in similar manners on October 19, 2012, and December 14, 2010, respectively.

The CWF held a moment of silence for Gossett at their event the day after his death. He was posthumously inducted into the WCW Hall of Fame in 1993 (becoming the first posthumous inductee), the Wrestling Observer Newsletter Hall of Fame in 1996, and the NWA Hall of Fame in 2006. On March 29, 2008, he was inducted into the WWE Hall of Fame by Dusty Rhodes. His son, Mike, accepted the honor on behalf of his father. He was also inducted into the Professional Wrestling Hall of Fame and Museum in 2018.

== Championships and accomplishments ==
- Capitol Wrestling Corporation / World Wrestling Entertainment
  - NWA United States Tag Team Championship (Northeast version) (4 times) – with Jerry Graham
  - WWE Hall of Fame (Class of 2008)
- Championship Wrestling from Florida
  - NWA Brass Knuckles Championship (Florida version) (2 times)
  - NWA Florida Heavyweight Championship (1 time)
  - NWA Florida Tag Team Championship (1 time) – with Mike Graham
  - NWA Southern Heavyweight Championship (Florida version) (3 times)
  - NWA Southern Tag Team Championship (Florida version) (2 times) – with Don Curtis (1) and Lester Welch (1)
  - NWA United States Tag Team Championship (Florida version) (2 times) – with Dick Steinborn
  - NWA World Tag Team Championship (Florida version) (7 times) – with Ike Eakins (1), Sam Steamboat (3), Bob Orton (2), and José Lothario (1)
- Japan Wrestling Association
  - All Asia Tag Team Championship (1 time) – with Killer Karl Kox
- Mid-Atlantic Championship Wrestling / World Championship Wrestling
  - NWA Southern Tag Team Championship (Mid-Atlantic version) (1 time) – with Sam Steamboat
  - WCW Hall of Fame (Class of 1993)
- Mid-South Sports
  - NWA Georgia Tag Team Championship (1 time) – with Mike Graham
  - World Heavyweight Championship (Georgia version) (1 time)
- Midwest Wrestling Association
  - MWA World Junior Heavyweight Championship (1 time)
- National Wrestling Alliance
  - NWA Hall of Fame (Class of 2006)
- NWA Mid-America
  - NWA Southern Tag Team Championship (Mid-America version) (2 times) – with Roy Welch
  - NWA World Tag Team Championship (Mid-America version) (1 time) – with Sam Steamboat
- Professional Wrestling Hall of Fame
  - Class of 2018
- Southwest Sports, Inc.
  - NWA Texas Tag Team Championship (1 time) – with Johnny Valentine
- Western States Sports
  - NWA Southwest Tag Team Championship (3 times) – with Art Nelson
  - NWA World Tag Team Championship (Amarillo version) (4 times) – with Art Nelson (2), Dory Funk (1), and Sam Steamboat (1)
- Wrestling Observer Newsletter
  - Wrestling Observer Newsletter Hall of Fame (Class of 1996)

Preceded by Fritz Von Erich	President of the National Wrestling Alliance; 1976–1978	Succeeded by Bob Geigel
