= Arnold Skaaland =

American professional wrestler and manager (1925–2007)

Personal information
- Born: January 21, 1925 White Plains, New York, U.S.
- Died: March 13, 2007 (aged 82) White Plains, New York, U.S.
- Spouse: Betty Skaaland
- Children: 3

Professional wrestling career
- Ring name(s): Arnold Skaaland; Bobby Weaver
- Billed height: 6 ft 0 in (1.83 m)
- Billed weight: 240 lb (110 kg)
- Billed from: Norway; White Plains, New York
- Debut: 1946
- Retired: 1987
- Military service
- Allegiance: United States
- Branch: United States Marine Corps
- Conflicts: World War II

Arnold Skaaland (January 21, 1925 – March 13, 2007) was an American professional wrestler and professional wrestling manager.

Following a stint in the United States Marine Corps during World War II, Skaaland began wrestling in 1946 under his real name. Given the nickname “Golden Boy,” he became a part of the World Wide Wrestling Federation in 1963, and in 1967, won the WWWF United States Tag Team Championship with Spiros Arion.

In 1978, Skaaland retired from in-ring competition and transitioned into a manager; unlike most managers, he managed faces instead of heels. Skaaland's most notable clients included Bruno Sammartino and Bob Backlund. Skaaland later became a road agent for the WWF, and was inducted into the WWF Hall of Fame in 1994.

== Early life ==
Skaaland served in the U.S. Marines during World War II. After a short-lived attempt to make a living through boxing, he decided to become a professional wrestler.

== Professional wrestling career ==
=== Early career (1946–1963) ===
Skaaland debuted in 1946 as Arnold Skaaland. He was billed early in his career as hailing from Norway. Performing throughout the northeastern United States, Skaaland gained the nickname "The Golden Boy" and was known as a small, agile wrestler who relied on speed, wits, and toughness in the ring rather than size and strength. In the late 1950s, he wrestled in Georgia under the ring name Bobby Weaver.

In the early 1960s, Skaaland unsuccessfully challenged both Pat O'Connor and "Nature Boy" Buddy Rogers for the NWA World Heavyweight Championship. In 1962, Skaaland refereed a high-profile match between Freddie Blassie and Rikidōzan in Japan.

=== World Wide Wrestling Federation/World Wrestling Federation (1963–1994) ===
==== Wrestling appearances (1963–1978) ====
In 1963, Skaaland was a part of the newly created, New York City-based World Wide Wrestling Federation. On June 1, 1967, he collected his only title as one half of the WWWF United States Tag Team Champions, when Tony Parisi gave his half of the title to Skaaland. Skaaland and his partner, Spiros Arion, soon lost the titles to The Sicilians (Lou Albano and Tony Altimore) on July 10, 1967, in Atlantic City, New Jersey. Arion and Bruno Sammartino rewon the belts two weeks later, and retired them. In addition to wrestling, Skaaland was a shareholder of the Capitol Wrestling Corporation, the parent company of the WWWF, and a business partner of WWWF Chairman Vince McMahon Sr. Skaaland was responsible for producing WWWF shows in the Westchester County Center in Westchester County, New York, and serving as an agent for André the Giant.

==== Managerial appearances ====
Skaaland managed Bruno Sammartino and Bob Backlund, with both men winning the WWF World Heavyweight Championship under his tutelage. In 1978, Skaaland retired from regular wrestling, though he occasionally appeared as a late substitute for wrestlers that couldn't make a show. Pro Wrestling Illustrated named Skaaland Manager of the Year for 1978 and 1979. Backlund's lengthy reign ended on December 26, 1983, when Skaaland threw in the towel while Backlund was trapped in the camel clutch, the finishing move of challenger The Iron Sheik. It was also rumored that Backlund begged authorities for a rematch.

Skaaland appeared in the 1987 music video for the title track from Piledriver - The Wrestling Album 2, "Piledriver" by Koko B. Ware as the foreman of a construction site. In 1994, he was inducted into the WWF Hall of Fame class of 1994 for managing both Sammartino and Backlund to the (W)WWF World Heavyweight Championship. He appeared on WWF television later that year, with Backlund attacking him in order to consolidate his heel turn.

== Personal life ==
Skaaland was married to Betty Skaaland. They had three sons: Edward Patrick, James Allen, and George (the last of whom briefly competed as a wrestler in the mid-1980s).

== Death ==
Skaaland died on March 13, 2007, at the age of 82, with his wife by his side. He had been sick for some time. He is interred at Gate of Heaven Cemetery in Hawthorne, New York.

== Championships and accomplishments ==
- Cauliflower Alley Club
  - Other honoree (1994)
- Pro Wrestling Illustrated
  - PWI Manager of the Year (1978, 1979)
- World Wide Wrestling Federation / World Wrestling Federation
  - WWWF United States Tag Team Championship (1 time) - with Spiros Arion
  - WWF Hall of Fame (Class of 1994)
  - Slammy Award (1 time)
    - Lifetime Achievement Award (1997)
