= Pacific Coast Junior Heavyweight Championship =

Professional wrestling championship

Details
- Promotion: Pacific Northwest
- Date established: December 25, 1940
- Date retired: May 15, 1957
Statistics
- First champion(s): Billy McEuin
- Final champion(s): Ed Francis
- Most reigns: Frank Stojack (5 reigns)

The Pacific Coast Junior Heavyweight Championship was a professional wrestling championship that was contended for in the Pacific Northwest from the early 1940s until 1957. When the title was retired in 1957, it was the top singles title in the Pacific Northwest area.

== Title history ==
Key

Symbol	Meaning
No.	The overall championship reign
Reign	The reign number for the specific wrestler listed.
Event	The event in which the championship changed hands
N/A	The specific information is not known
—	Used for vacated reigns in order to not count it as an official reign
[Note #]	Indicates that the exact length of the title reign is unknown, with a note providing more details.

#	Wrestler	Reign	Date	Days held	Location	Event	Notes	Ref.
1	Billy McEuin	1	December 25, 1940	151	Eugene, Oregon	House show	Defeated Billy Raeborn	
2	Herb Parks	1	May 22, 1941	21	Eugene, Oregon	House show		
3	Billy McEuin	2	June 12, 1941	84	Eugene, Oregon	House show		
4	George Wagner	1	September 4, 1941	(Note: The length of the title reign is too uncertain to calculate)	Eugene, Oregon	House show		
5	Gust Johnson	1	N/A		N/A	House show		
6	George Dussette	1	March 26, 1945	126	N/A	House show		
7	Jack Lipscomb	1	July 30, 1945	133	N/A	House show		
8	Joe Lynam	1	December 10, 1945	113	N/A	House show		
9	Bruno Angelo	1	April 2, 1946	86	N/A	House show		
10	George Dussette	2	June 27, 1946	74	N/A	House show		
11	Pete Belacastro	1	September 9, 1946		N/A	House show		
12	Herb Parks	2	N/A		N/A	House show		
13	Jackie Nichols	1	August 28, 1947	108	N/A	House show		
14	Frank Stojack	1	December 14, 1947	136	Yakima, Washington	House show		
15	Gordon Hessell	1	April 28, 1948	(Note: The exact date that Hessell lost the championship is uncertain, which puts his title reign at between 3 and 33 days.)	N/A	House show		
16	Frank Stojack	2	May 1948	(Note: The exact date that Stojack won the championship is uncertain, which means that the title reign lasted between 8 and 38 days.)	N/A	House show		
17	Jack McLaughlin	1	June 8, 1949		Vancouver, British Columbia	House show		
-	Vacated	-	1949	N/A	N/A	N/A	Vacated for undocumented reasons	
18	Tony Ross	1	August 21, 1949	50	Vancouver, British Columbia	House show	Defeated Leo Kirikeno	
19	Buck Weaver	1	October 10, 1949	31	N/A	House show		
20	Al Szasz	1	November 10, 1949	66	N/A	House show		
21	Bob Cummings	1	January 15, 1950	167	N/A	House show		
22	Leo Wallick	1	July 1, 1950	174	N/A	House show		
23	Frank Stojack	3	December 22, 1950	94	Tacoma, Washington	House show		
24	Andy Tremaine *	1	March 26, 1951	94	Portland, Oregon	House show		
25	Dale Haddock *	1	June 28, 1951	51	Portland, Oregon	House show		
26	Frenchy Roy *	1	August 18, 1951	(Note: The date French Roy lost the championship is uncertain, which means that the title reign lasted between 1 day and 134 days.)	Portland, Oregon	House show		
27	Frank Stojack	4	1951	(Note: The date Stojack won and lost the championship is uncertain, which means that the title reign lasted between 1 day and 134 days.)	N/A	House show		
28	Masked Marvel (Note: The Masked Marvel was Buddy Knox.)	1	December 1951	(Note: The exact date that the Masked Marvel won the championship is uncertain, which means that the championship reign lasted between 137 and 167 days.)	Seattle, Washington	House show		
29	Roger Mackay	1	May 16, 1952	211	Tacoma, Washington	House show		
30	Frank Stojack	5	December 13, 1952	369	Roseburg, Oregon	House show		
31	Roger Mackay	2	December 17, 1953		N/A	House show		
32	Carl Engstrom	1	1954		N/A	House show		
-	Vacated	-	1954	N/A	N/A	N/A	Vacated for undocumented reasons	
33	Tommy Martindale	1	May 14, 1954	18	Portland, Oregon	House show	Won tournament; Roger Mackey defeats Martindale, but Martindale refuses to hand over the belt and later loses it to Kurt Von Poppenheim	
34	Kurt Von Poppenheim	1	June 11, 1954	153	Longview, Washington	House show		
35	Luigi Macera	1	November 11, 1954	29	N/A	House show		
36	Kurt Von Poppenheim	2	December 10, 1954	76	N/A	House show		
36	Pepper Gomez	1	February 24, 1955		N/A	House show		
-	Vacated	-	1955	N/A	N/A	N/A	Vacated for undocumented reasons	
37	Larry Chene	1	February 24, 1956	84	N/A	House show		
38	Bull Montana	1	May 18, 1956	21	N/A	House show		
39	Kurt Von Poppenheim	3	June 8, 1956	212	N/A	House show		
40	Red Bastien	1	January 6, 1957	12	N/A	House show		
41	Kurt Von Poppenheim	4	January 18, 1957	38	N/A	House show		
42	Luigi Macera	2	February 25, 1957	79	N/A	House show		
43	Ed Francis	1	May 15, 1957	(Note: The exact date that the championship was abandoned is uncertain, which means that the championship reign lasted between 0 days ad 16 days.)	N/A	House show		
-	Abandoned	-	May 1957	N/A	N/A	N/A	Title abandoned	
