= Roy Heffernan =

Australian professional wrestler (1925–1992)

Personal information
- Born: Lawrence Roy Heffernan; 12 July 1925 Lithgow, New South Wales, Australia
- Died: 24 September 1992 (aged 67) Sydney, New South Wales, Australia

Professional wrestling career
- Ring name: Roy Heffernan
- Billed height: 5 ft 10 in (1.78 m)
- Billed weight: 212 lb (96 kg) - 240 lb (110 kg)
- Billed from: Australia
- Trained by: Laurence Heffernan (father)
- Debut: 1944
- Retired: 1971

Laurence Roy Heffernan (12 July 1925 – 24 September 1992) was an Australian professional wrestler. Roy Heffernan toured all over the world, but is most famous for being one half of the original version of the tag team the Fabulous Kangaroos (with Al Costello). The Kangaroos used an "Ultra Australian" gimmick complete with Boomerangs, bush hats and "Waltzing Matilda" as their entrance music. The first incarnation of the Kangaroos is the most famous of all the Kangaroo versions and is often credited with popularizing tag team wrestling in the late 1950s and 1960s. Costello and Heffernan are also regarded as one of the top tag teams to ever compete in professional wrestling.

When the Kangaroos broke up, Heffernan left America to return to his home of Australia. In Australia, Heffernan was involved with Australia's version of World Championship Wrestling under booker Jim Barnett where he worked as a face (good guy), the polar opposite of his time spent as a Fabulous Kangaroo. Both Heffernan and Costello died before the team was honored by being the first tag team inducted into the Professional Wrestling Hall of Fame in 2003. The induction of the Fabulous Kangaroos started a tradition of inducting a new team every year.

== Biography ==
=== Starting out ===
Roy Heffernan was a native Australian, born in Lithgow NSW, and was an avid weightlifter and bodybuilder in his teens. He was trained by his father, who was also a bodybuilder, and won the Mr. Australia title before making his wrestling debut at the age of twenty. Heffernan did not have an easy time moving up the ranks in Australian pro-wrestling, as the belief at the time was that a wrestler really had to go overseas to North America and learn to be a pro before the bookers would even consider moving them up the rankings of the promotion. After working on the lower cards in Australia, Heffernan left his home country in 1953 and moved to America in the hopes of attaining more success there.

=== Fabulous Kangaroos ===
For years, Al Costello had been working on an idea for a new tag team and even had an idea of who his partner should be in this new tag team: a wrestler he had worked with some years ago (Heffernan). The problem was that Costello and Heffernan had lost touch over the years, so the idea remained dormant until Costello went on a tour of Hawaii in 1956. Costello mentioned his idea of an "Ultra Australian" tag team to fellow wrestler and future promoter, Joe Blanchard. Blanchard was good friends with Heffernan and knew that he was working in Stampede Wrestling at that point in time. Blanchard put the two in touch with each other, and soon after, Costello was off to Calgary, Alberta, Canada to join up with Heffernan. Costello and Heffernan made their debut as the Fabulous Kangaroos on 3 May 1957 for Stu Hart's Stampede Wrestling promotion in a match against Maurice LaPointe and Tony Baillargeon. Only weeks after making their debut, the Kangaroos were working with the top tag teams of the promotion.

After working in Stampede for a while, the Fabulous Kangaroos traveled across the United States, headlining shows wherever they went due to their ability to rile the crowd up with their heel (bad guy) tactics. On one occasion in August 1958 the Kangaroos, or "Kangaroo Men" as they were billed, nearly caused a riot in Madison Square Garden during a match against Antonino Rocca and Miguel Pérez. The fans began to throw fruit and stones after the match ended without a decisive winner, and the promoters had to step in, turn up the lights in the arena and play the National Anthem to stop a potential riot from breaking out. Everywhere the team went, they seemed to win championships; be it the Texas version of the NWA World Tag Team Championship in Dory Funk's NWA Western States promotion, or the forerunner to the WWWF United States Tag Team Championship, the North East version of the NWA United States Tag Team Championship.

During their time together from 1957 until 1965, the Kangaroos wrestled in the United States, Canada, Asia and select tours of Australia and New Zealand. They worked for such companies as Capitol Wrestling Corporation (the future World Wrestling Entertainment), Championship Wrestling from Florida, NWA Ohio, the Japan Wrestling Association and the World Wrestling Association in Los Angeles.

The Kangaroos never forgot the territory that started it all and worked in Canada off and on over the years. The team not only worked for Stampede Wrestling while in Canada, but also worked for NWA All-Star Wrestling based in Vancouver, British Columbia. The Fabulous Kangaroos' 1965 run in NWA All-Star Wrestling turned out to be the last time the original Kangaroos teamed together. In June 1965, the Kangaroos lost to Don Leo Jonathan and Jim Hardy and then split up. Heffernan left Australia to tour the world and wanted to return to his homeland, while Costello was determined to remain in the United States at least for a while longer. In 1967, they reunited for one-night.

=== Return to Australia ===
Roy Heffernan returned to his native Australia and became one of the main wrestlers for World Championship Wrestling (WCW) (the Australian version) under promoter Jim Barnett. Heffernan retained his "Ultra Australian" gimmick complete with Bush hat and boomerang, but what had made him a heel (bad guy) in the United States made him a beloved face (good guy) in Australia. Heffernan's Fan Club Yearbook circa 1966 gives the following physical statistics for Roy Heffernan: neck 17.5 inches; chest 48.5 inches; waist 32.5 inches; thigh 27 inches; biceps 17.5 inches; calf 17.5 inches. He was billed in 1967 as weighing 225 lb. Costello was originally supposed to join Heffernan in Australia, but it never worked out that way, leaving Costello in the United States while Heffernan wrestled as a singles wrestler. Later in his career, Heffernan became involved in the actual running of WCW before retiring in the 1980s.

=== Death ===
Roy Heffernan died on 24 September 1992 at St George Hospital in Sydney from a heart attack. In 2003, the Professional Wrestling Hall of Fame inducted Roy Heffernan, along with Al Costello, as the first ever tag team to be inducted into the Hall of Fame. From 2003 and forward, the Hall of Fame has honored other tag teams, but the Fabulous Kangaroos were given the honor of being the first team to enter the Hall of Fame; in the tradition of the Kangaroos they were "billed as champions on arrival" one last time.

== Championships and accomplishments ==
- Alex Turk Promotions (Winnipeg)

- International Tag Team Championship (2 times) - with Al Costello

- Capitol Wrestling Corporation

- NWA United States Tag Team Championship (Northwest version) (3 times) - with Al Costello

- Championship Wrestling from Florida

- NWA United States Tag Team Championship (Florida version) (1 time) - with Al Costello
- NWA World Tag Team Championship (Florida version) (1 time) - with Al Costello

- International Wrestling Enterprise

- Trans-World Wrestling Alliance Heavyweight Championship (1 time)

- Japan Wrestling Association

- NWA International Tag Team Championship (1 time) - with Al Costello

- Midwest Wrestling Association

- NWA United States Tag Team Championship (Ohio version)(1 time) - with Al Costello

- Mike London Promotions

- Rocky Mountain Tag Team Championship (1 time) - with Al Costello

- National Wrestling Alliance

- NWA Hall of Fame (Class of 2013)

- NWA All-Star Wrestling

- NWA Canadian Tag Team Championship (Vancouver version) (4 times) - with Al Costello

- NWA Detroit

- NWA World Tag Team Championship (Detroit version) (2 times) - with Al Costello

- NWA Western States Sports

- NWA International Tag Team Championship (Texas version) (1 time) - with Al Costello^{1}
- NWA Southwest Heavyweight Championship (1 time)
- NWA World Tag Team Championship (Amarillo version) (1 time) - with Al Costello
- NWA World Tag Team Championship (Texas version) (1 time) - with Al Costello

- Pacific Northwest Wrestling

- NWA Pacific Northwest Tag Team Championship (1 time) – with Red Bastien

- Worldwide Wrestling Associates

- WWA World Tag Team Championship (1 time) - with Al Costello
- WWA International Television Tag Team Championship (2 times) - with Al Costello

- Professional Wrestling Hall of Fame

- Class of 2003 - with Al Costello

- Wrestling Observer Newsletter

- Wrestling Observer Newsletter Hall of Fame (Class of 1996)
^{1.} Title also recognized by World Class Championship Wrestling.
