= Capitol Wrestling Corporation =

American professional wrestling promotion

Capitol Wrestling Corporation Ltd.
- Trade name: Capitol Wrestling Corporation
- Type: Private
- Industry: Professional wrestling promotion Boxing promotion
- Founded: January 7, 1953; 73 years ago (as Capitol Wrestling Corporation Ltd.); April 1963; 63 years ago (rebranding as the World Wide Wrestling Federation)
- Founders: Jess McMahon or Vincent J. McMahon (Note: The founder of Capitol Wrestling Corporation (CWC) is uncertain. While some sources claim that CWC was founded by Vincent J. McMahon, others claim that Jess McMahon founded the company.)
- Defunct: 1982; 44 years ago
- Fate: Acquired by Titan Sports, Inc.
- Successor: Titan Sports, Inc. (Now known as World Wrestling Entertainment)
- Headquarters: Holland Hotel; 351 West 42nd Street; New York City 10036, United States
- Area served: Northeastern United States
- Owner: Vincent J. McMahon

Capitol Wrestling Corporation (CWC) was an American sports promotion company. Run by Vincent J. McMahon from the 1950s until the 1980s, the company was originally a professional wrestling and professional boxing promotion and later became the holding company for the World Wide Wrestling Federation (WWWF), later the World Wrestling Federation (WWF). In 1982, the CWC was acquired by Titan Sports, Inc., owned by Vincent J. McMahon's son, Vince McMahon. The CWC was the precursor to today's WWE, currently run by Nick Khan as president and owned by TKO Group Holdings.

== History ==
=== Early history (1953–1963) ===
Jess McMahon was a successful professional boxing promoter who began working with Tex Rickard in 1926. With the help of Rickard, he began promoting boxing at the third Madison Square Garden. McMahon would later take over the wrestling side of Rickard's promotional business; Rickard was noted for disliking wrestling and prevented wrestling events from being held at Madison Square Garden. A few years prior to 1926, professional wrestler Toots Mondt had created a new style of professional wrestling that he called "Slam Bang Western Style Wrestling". The advent of Slam Bang Western Style Wrestling ultimately transformed professional wrestling from a legitimate combat sport into a series of predetermined pseudo-competitive exhibitions. Mondt convinced wrestler Ed Lewis, who then held the World Heavyweight Wrestling Championship, and his manager Billy Sandow to embrace this new predetermined style of wrestling, with the three men forming a business partnership dubbed the "Gold Dust Trio". The Gold Dust Trio formed what is considered the first modern promotion in professional wrestling history and were successful in getting many wrestlers of the time to sign contracts with their promotion. After much success, a power struggle amongst its members caused the trio to dissolve and, with it, their promotion. Mondt later formed partnerships with several other promoters, including Jack Curley in New York City. Curley's ill health led to Mondt, aided by Jess McMahon and others, taking over the New York City wrestling scene. Mondt's control over wrestling in New York City ended after promoter Jack Pfefer revealed the predetermined nature of wrestling to the area's sports writers, harming wrestling's popularity in the city. Mondt additionally had major disagreements with his top star Antonino Rocca, which led to Mondt's partner Ray Fabiani aligning with other promoters to appease Rocca.

On January 7, 1953, the first show under the Capitol Wrestling Corporation (CWC) banner was produced. It is not certain who the founder of the CWC was. Some sources state that it was Jess' son Vincent J. McMahon while other sources (including the website of the CWC's successor, WWE) credit Jess himself as the founder of the CWC. Shortly after its founding, the CWC joined the National Wrestling Alliance (NWA) and Mondt soon after joined the CWC. Together, Vincent J. McMahon and Toots Mondt were very successful and controlled approximately 70% of the NWA board's booking decisions, largely due to their dominance in the heavily populated northeastern United States.

=== World Wide Wrestling Federation (1963–1979) ===
In early 1963, the CWC pulled out of the NWA and transformed into the World Wide Wrestling Federation (WWWF), the precursor to current-day WWE, following a dispute over CWC wrestler Buddy Rogers being booked to lose the NWA World Heavyweight Championship to Lou Thesz. McMahon and Mondt continued to promote Rogers as the NWA World Heavyweight Champion, despite his loss to Thesz, until April 11 when they awarded him the inaugural WWWF World Heavyweight Championship. Rogers lost the WWWF title to Bruno Sammartino on May 17. Despite the change in the promotion's trade name, the company was still known legally as Capitol Wrestling Corporation Ltd., which served as the holding company for the WWWF and later the World Wrestling Federation (WWF) until 1982.

The WWWF operated in a conservative manner compared to other wrestling promotions of its time; it ran its major arenas monthly rather than weekly or bi-weekly, usually featuring a babyface champion wrestling various heels in programs that consisted of one to three matches. After gaining a television deal and turning the well-known tag team wrestler Lou Albano into a manager for Sammartino's heel opponents, the WWWF began doing sell out business and, by 1970, became one of the largest promotions of wrestling's territorial era.

After disagreements over television deals which were compounded by issues caused by his gambling addiction, Mondt was "muscled out" of the leadership of the WWWF and ultimately sold off his shares to McMahon in the mid-1960s. McMahon later made Mondt a salaried employee of the WWWF, an arrangement that continued until Mondt's death on June 11, 1976.

=== Rebranding and sale to Titan Sports (1979–1982) ===
By March 1979, for marketing purposes, the World Wide Wrestling Federation was renamed the World Wrestling Federation (WWF). The following year, Vincent J. McMahon's son, Vincent K. McMahon, founded Titan Sports, Inc., which incorporated on February 21, 1980, originally in Massachusetts. Vincent K. McMahon had served as a ring announcer and commentator for WWWF television programs since 1969. Beginning in 1971, he began promoting events for his father in isolated regions of the WWWF territory, primarily in Maine.

In 1982, Titan Sports, Inc. acquired Capitol Wrestling Corporation Ltd., effectively relocating its headquarters from New York City to Greenwich, Connecticut. At the annual meeting of the NWA in 1983, the McMahons and WWF employee Jim Barnett all withdrew from the organization. In 1984, in an attempt to make the WWF the premier wrestling promotion in the world, McMahon began a national (and later international) expansion that fundamentally changed the wrestling industry and brought an end to its territorial era. By 1985, Titan Sports moved its headquarters to Titan Towers in Stamford, Connecticut and, in 1987, reincorporated itself under Delaware General Corporation Law. Titan Sports later changed its name to World Wrestling Federation Entertainment, Inc. in 1999, and World Wrestling Entertainment, Inc. (WWE) in 2002. Vincent J. McMahon would not live to see his company transform from a territorial Northeast-based wrestling promotion to a worldwide entertainment organization. He died from pancreatic cancer at 69 years old on May 24, 1984.

== Legacy ==
In October 2020, WWE's NXT brand introduced the "Capitol Wrestling Center", a new home studio in Orlando, Florida within the WWE Performance Center training facility, which was named as a tribute to the CWC.

== See also ==
- List of independent wrestling promotions in the United States
- List of National Wrestling Alliance territories
