= Dizzy Davis =

American professional wrestler (1914–1983)

Personal information
- Born: Sterling Blake Davis; November 8, 1914 Houston, Texas, U.S.
- Died: December 19, 1983 (aged 69)

Professional wrestling career
- Ring name(s): Dizzy Davis; Blake Davis; Satin Kid; Bert Davis; Sterling Blake Davis; Sterling Davis; Gardenia Davis
- Billed height: 5 ft 9 in (175 cm)
- Billed weight: 190 lb (86 kg)
- Debut: 1935
- Retired: 1960

Sterling Blake Davis (November 8, 1914 – December 19, 1983), known by the ring names Dizzy Davis, was an American professional wrestler who is considered one of the very first exótico wrestlers in the 1930s, 1940s and 1950s. He wrestled mainly in Texas.

== Professional wrestling career ==
Davis made his wrestling debut in 1935 in Los Angeles. He started out using an effeminent gimmick in Mexico for CMLL in 1942 – the first “homosexual” character in wrestling history. His gimmick was followed by Gorgeous George who used the gimmick in the United States.

Spent most of his career in Texas, working for Houston Wrestling and World Class Championship Wrestling. Won the NWA Southwest Junior Heavyweight Championship 3 times. He would have matches with Lou Thesz, El Santo, Verne Gagne, Dory Funk Sr., Gory Guerrero, Buddy Rogers, Freddie Blassie, and Killer Kowalski.

In March 1959, Davis lost to boxer Archie Moore by knockout in a boxer vs. wrestler match. The referee stopped it due to bad cuts over both of Davis' eyes. Davis was down three times in the 2nd.

He retired from wrestling in 1960.

== Personal life ==
Davis was the childhood friend of Gorgeous George (George Wagner). Both broke into the wrestling scene in Houston.

== Death ==
Davis died on December 19, 1983, at 69.

== Championships and accomplishments ==
- Western States Sports
  - NWA Southwest Tag Team Championship (2 times) – with Sonny Myers (2)
  - NWA World Tag Team Championship (Amarillo version) (3 times) - with Sonny Myers (2), Great Bolo (1) and Don Curtis (1)
  - NWA Southwest Tag Team Championship (2 times) – with Tony Morelli (1) and Art Nelson (1)
  - NWA Southwest Junior Heavyweight Championship (3 times)
  - NWA Texas Heavyweight Championship (2 times)
