= Lorenzo Parente =

Professional wrestler (1935-2014)

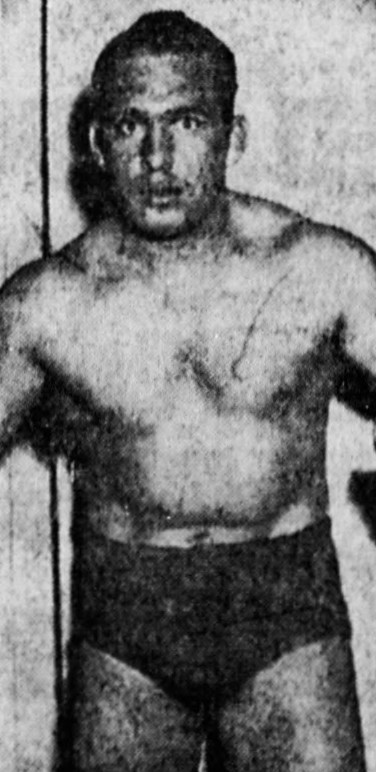
- Parenre, circa 1963

Personal information
- Born: Lorenzo Parente; March 16, 1935 Chieti, Abruzzo, Italy
- Died: March 15, 2014 (aged 78) Brentwood, Tennessee, U.S.
- Spouse: Christine "Dina" Parente
- Children: Tony, Rosie, Frazier and Michael

Professional wrestling career
- Ring name(s): Lorenzo Parente; Pancho Parente; Mephisto; Spoiler #1; Blue Avenger; Pancho Lopez; Larry Lopez; Tony Lorenzo
- Billed height: 5 ft 11 in (1.80 m)
- Billed weight: 229 lb (104 kg)
- Billed from: Naples, Italy
- Debut: 1958
- Retired: 1976

Lorenzo Parente "Martino" was an Italian professional wrestler who competed throughout the United States from 1958 to 1976. During his career he captured the NWA World Junior Heavyweight Championship on two occasions (both of which he won from Danny Hodge). He was also known for his long standing tag team with Bobby Hart, with whom he captured numerous regional and world NWA Tag Team Championships.

Parente competed for various promotions throughout his career, including NWA Mid-America, NWA Western States, Championship Wrestling from Florida, Jim Barnett's World Championship Wrestling, NWA Tri-State and the WWF.

== Professional wrestling career ==
=== Early life and career (NWA Amarillo) ===
Parente was born March 16, 1935, in the small village of Chieti, one of five sons born to parents Antonio and Rosaria Parente. He moved to the United States in 1959 to pursue professional that same year, wrestling under his real name and as "Pancho López", primarily in the Amarillo, Texas territory. As Pancho López, he won the NWA North American Heavyweight Championship two times in 1960, defeating Gene LeBell and Mike DiBiase respectively. Soon thereafter he formed a tag team called "Continental Warriors" with Bobby Hart, under the ring names "Mephisto and Dante". It was to be a pairing that would last on-and-off for most of his career. They had their first taste of success as a tag team in the early 1960s, winning the NWA Mid-America Tag Team Championship on numerous occasions, feuding with the likes of Lester Welch and Jackie Fargo. They would go to win the titles six times.

=== NWA World Junior Heavyweight Champion (1965-1966) ===
Parente feuded with Danny Hodge in Arkansas and Oklahoma in the mid-1960s. He defeated Hodge on November 23, 1965, to win his first NWA World Junior Heavyweight Championship. He lost the title to Hodge on January 4, 1966, before winning it back on January 14 to become a two-time champion. On December 3, 1968, Parente and Hodge won the NWA Tri-State Tag Team Championship in Tulsa, Oklahoma.

=== NWA Tri-State, NWA Florida and teaming with Paul DeMarco ===
By 1966, Parente was travelling throughout the National Wrestling Alliance. He became a mainstay with Championship Wrestling from Florida and on December 24, 1967, he captured the NWA World Tag Team Championship with Paul DeMarco, defeating Kurt and Skull Von Stroheim. They went on to capture the titles for the second time the following year on January 16, defeating Terry and Ron Garvin in Tampa, Florida. That same year, he won the NWA Tri-State Tag Team Championship with former adversary Danny Hodge, on December 3.

=== The Continental Warriors ===
Having held tag titles with him previously, Parente claimed tag team gold with Bobby Hart once again in 1969, this time capturing the NWA World Tag Team Championship in Mid-America. The team found great success as a heel pairing, using underhand tactics to achieve victory, including the use of foreign objects. They would go on to capture numerous regional and world tag team titles together as The Continental Warriors, holding the NWA World Tag Team Championship six times and winning regional tag titles throughout the United States including the tag titles of NWA Mid-America, Championship Wrestling from Florida, NWA Western States and the NWA United States Tag Team Championship in NWA Mid-America and Tri-State. They also captured the NWA Tennessee Tag Team Championship, defeating Don & Ron Wright in May 1973. Southern wrestling legend Jerry Lawler remarked in his autobiography that Tennessee "had some of the best tag team goings at the time", with the top teams often in the feature matches. He describes Parente and Hart as "main event caliber guys who had been in the business a long time".

Parente held several other championships during the remainder of his career, including two reigns as NWA United States Junior Heavyweight Champion, both times defeating Don Greene. His last title victory was with a championship he had not previously held, when he won the NWA World Six-Man Tag Team Championship with John Gray and Big Bad John defeating Dennis Hall, Jackie Fargo and George Gulas on January 16, 1975.

=== Retirement and later life ===
Lorenzo Parente had retired from in-ring competition by the mid-1970s. He last wrestled in Lou Thesz's UWA promotion in 1976. He settled in Brentwood, Tennessee, with his wife Christine "Dina" Parente where he opened a successful restaurant; Lorenzo's Italian Village in 1975. He died on March 15, 2014, at the age of 78. and was survived by his wife of 49 years, his children and grandchildren. He received a Catholic funeral and was laid to rest at Christ Church Memorial Gardens.

== Championships and accomplishments ==
- Central States Wrestling
  - NWA Missouri Junior Heavyweight Championship (1 time)
- Championship Wrestling from Florida
  - NWA World Tag Team Championship (Florida version) (2 times)
- National Wrestling Alliance
  - NWA World Junior Heavyweight Championship (2 times)
- NWA Mid-America
  - AWA Southern Tag Team Championship (1 time)
  - NWA Mid-America Tag Team Championship (6 times)
  - NWA Tennessee Tag Team Championship (1 time)
  - NWA United States Tag Team Championship (Mid-America version) (1 time)
  - NWA United States Junior Heavyweight Championship (Mid-America version) (2 times)
  - NWA World Tag Team Championship (Mid-America version) (8 times)
- NWA Tri-State
  - NWA Tri-State Tag Team Championship (3 times)
- Western States Sports
  - NWA North American Heavyweight Championship (Amarillo version) (2 times)
  - NWA Western States Tag Team Championship (2 times)
  - NWA Western States Heavyweight Championship (2 times)
  - NWA World Tag Team Championship (Amarillo version) (2 times) - with Alex Perez (1 time) and Gory Guerrero (1 time)
- World Championship Wrestling
  - World Brass Knuckles Championship (1 time)
