= List of National Wrestling Alliance territories =

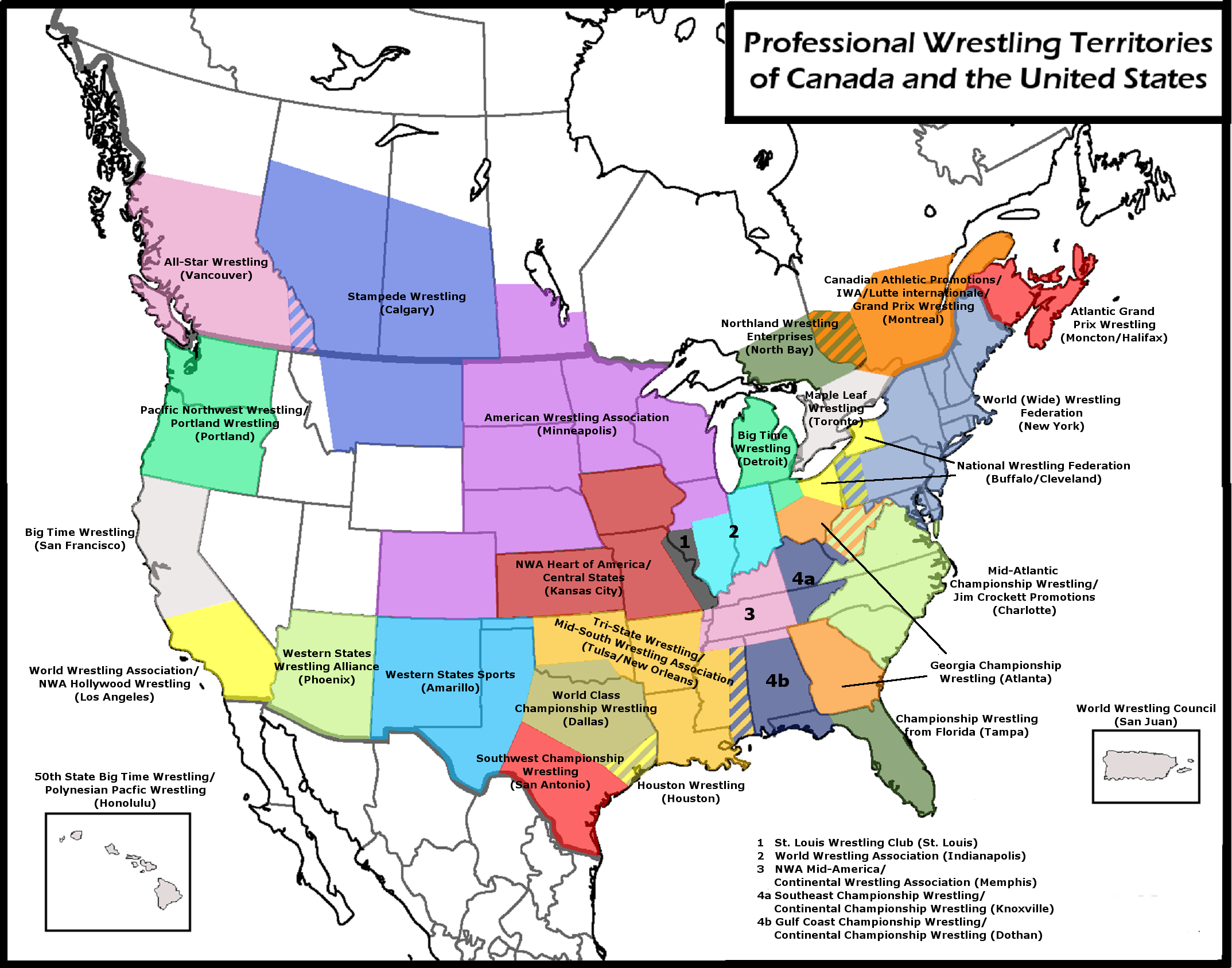
The old NWA territory system in the United States and Canada from the 1940’s to 1980’s

Formed in 1948, the National Wrestling Alliance (NWA) governing body was the largest organization in professional wrestling until the World Wrestling Federation (WWF)'s Golden Era. Under the control of the NWA Board of Directors (consisting of various prominent, regional promoters), the governing body oversaw wrestling's national territory system, a system which saw promotions (referred to as "territories") recognize one world heavyweight champion, participate in talent exchanges, and collectively protect the territorial integrity of NWA members. Unlike modern independent promotions, the territories were regarded as major promotions and often collaborated with other NWA members.

In 1993, the NWA was reorganized following the withdrawals of World Championship Wrestling (WCW) and New Japan Pro-Wrestling (NJPW), with the majority of new NWA territories being small independent promotions. As other territories withdrew from the governing body, the NWA would discontinue its memberships in August 2012 and adopted a licensing model. In 2017, the NWA was purchased by Billy Corgan's Lightning One, Inc., which abandoned the licensing model and gradually transformed the NWA from a governing body to a stand-alone wrestling promotion.

In October 2023, while still under the ownership of Billy Corgan's Lightning One, Inc., the NWA reintroduced the territory system. The first NWA-affiliated promotion introduced under the new system was NWA Exodus Pro Midwest, owned by then NWA World's Heavyweight Champion Michael "EC3" Hutter.

== Current NWA-affiliated promotions and/or territories ==
The following promotions joined the NWA after the re-establishment of the territory system in October 2023.

Territories

Promotion	Year(s) in the NWA	Territory	Promoter(s)
Fight The World Wrestling	2023– (Note: Fight The World Wrestling is billed by the NWA as an "unsanctioned territory".)	Largo, Florida	Bryan Idol, Mike Mondo, and Natalia Markova
NWA JCP Southeast	2023–	Coalfield, Tennessee	Joe Cazana
NWA Chicago	2024–	Chicago, Illinois	Bryan Idol and Billy Corgan
NWA Kross Fire	2024–	Sevierville, Tennessee	Kenzie Paige and Kylie Paige
NWA World League Wrestling	2024–	Troy, Missouri	Leland Race

Sub-governing bodies

Governing body	Affiliate(s)	Year(s) in the NWA	Territory	Promoter(s)
NWA Texas	Dogg Pound Championship Wrestling	2024–	San Antonio, Texas	Carlene Denise Moore-Begnaud and Rodney Begnaud
NWA Texas	Texas Style Wrestling	2024–	Dallas, Texas	David Horachek and Randy Cline
NWA New Mexico	Duke City Championship Wrestling	2025–	Albuquerque, New Mexico	Fred Slow
NWA New Mexico	South Plains Championship Wrestling	2026–	Lubbock, Texas	Justin Edwards

== Former NWA-affiliated promotions and/or territories ==
The following promotions were members/licensees of the NWA between its founding in 1948 and the organization's acquisition by Lightning One in 2017.

† indicates a founding member of the NWA

Promotion	Year(s) in the NWA	Territory	Promoter(s)
NWA Iowa	1948–1959	Des Moines, Iowa	Paul "Pinkie" George†
Minneapolis Boxing and Wrestling Club	1948–1960	Minneapolis, Minnesota	Tony Stecher† (through 1954); Wally Karbo (through 1954–1960); Verne Gagne (through 1954–1960)
Harry Light Wrestling Office	1948–1961	Detroit, Michigan	Harry Light†
Midwest Wrestling Association	1948–1967	Columbus, Ohio	Al Haft†
St. Louis Wrestling Club	1948–1985	St. Louis, Missouri	Sam Muchnick† (through 1982); Bob Geigel
Central States Wrestling	1948–1988	Kansas City, Missouri	Orville Brown† (through 1958); George Simpson (through 1958); Bob Geigel (1958–1986, 1987–1988); Jim Crockett, Jr. (1986–1987)
NWA Montana	1949–1950	Great Falls, Montana	Jerry Meeker
NWA Hollywood	1949–1956	Los Angeles, California	Hugh Nichols
American Wrestling Association	1949–1957	Boston, Massachusetts	Paul Bowser
NWA Nebraska	1949–1957	Omaha, Nebraska	Max Clayton
Montreal Wrestling	1949–1957	Montreal, Quebec, Canada	Eddie Quinn
John J. Doyle Enterprises; California Wrestling Office; Hollywood Wrestling	1949–1958; 1968–1983	Los Angeles, California	Johnny Doyle (through 1954); Cal Eaton (1954–1966); Mike LeBell (1958–1983)
NWA San Francisco	1949–1961	San Francisco, California	Joe Malcewicz
Fred Kohler Enterprises	1949–1963	Chicago, Illinois	Fred Kohler
Southwest Sports	1949–1966	Houston, Texas	Morris Sigel; Ed McLemore; Paul Boesch; Norman Clark
50th State Big Time Wrestling	1949–1979	Honolulu, Hawaii	Al Karasick (through 1961); Ed Francis; James Blears
NWA Mid-America	1949–1981	Dyersburg, Tennessee; Nashville, Tennessee	Nick Gulas; Roy Welch; John Cazana; Joe Gunter
Tulsa Promotions; Leroy McGuirk's Championship Wrestling; Tri-States Wrestling; Midwest Championship Wrestling; NWA Tri-State; Mid-South Wrestling	1949–1982	Tulsa, Oklahoma	Sam Avey (through 1958); Leroy McGuirk (1951–1979); Bill Watts (1979–1982)
Maple Leaf Wrestling	1949–1984	Toronto, Ontario, Canada	Frank Tunney (through 1983); Jack Tunney
ABC Booking; Mid South Sports; Georgia Championship Wrestling	1949–1984	Atlanta, Georgia	Paul Jones (through 1974); Jim Barnett (1973–1983); Ole Anderson
Eastern Sports Enterprises	1950–1957	New York City, New York	Rudy Dusek
Manhattan Booking Agency; Manhattan Wrestling Enterprises	1950–1957	New York City, New York	Joseph "Toots" Mondt
NWA Indianapolis	1950–1960	Indianapolis, Indiana	Billy Thom (through 1959); Balk Estes
Salt Lake Wrestling Club	1950–1960s	Orem, Utah	Dave Reynolds
Upstate Athletic Club; Buffalo Athletic Club; Erie Athletic Club	1950–1970	Buffalo, New York	Ed Don George (through late 1950s); Bobby Bruns; Pedro Martinez
NWA New Mexico	1950–1982	Albuquerque, New Mexico	Mike London
Championship Wrestling from Florida	1950–1987	Tampa, Florida	Clarence Luttrell (through 1971); Eddie Graham (through 1985); Hiro Matsuda (1985–1987); Duke Keomuka (1985–1987)
Western States Sports	1951–1980	Amarillo, Texas	Dory Detton (through 1955); Karl Sarpolis (1955–1966); Dory Funk (1955–1973); Dory Funk, Jr. (1967–1978); Terry Funk (1967–1978); Dick Murdoch (1978–1980); Bob Windham (1978–1980)
Foothills Athletic Club; Big Time Wrestling; Stampede Wrestling	1951–1982	Calgary, Alberta	Larry Tillman (through 1952); Stu Hart (1952–1982)
Jim Crockett Promotions; Mid Atlantic Championship Wrestling	1951–1988	Charlotte, North Carolina	Jim Crockett (through 1973); Jim Crockett, Jr.(1973–1988)
Japan Pro Wrestling Alliance	1953–1973	Tokyo, Japan	Rikidōzan (through 1963); Toyonobori (through 1966); Yoshinosato
NWA Gulf Coast	1953–1978	Dothan, Alabama	Buddy Fuller (through 1960); Lee Fields; Bobby Fields; Rocky McGuire
Empresa Mexicana de Lucha Libre	1953–1986	Mexico City, Mexico	Salvador Lutteroth
Capitol Wrestling Corporation; World Wide Wrestling Federation; World Wrestling Federation	1953–1963; 1971–1983	Washington, D.C. New York City, New York	Vincent J. McMahon (through 1982); Joseph "Toots" Mondt (through 1965); Vincent K. McMahon (from 1982)
Pacific Northwest Wrestling	1957–1992	Eugene, Oregon	Don Owen
NWA All Star Wrestling	Early 1960s–1985	Vancouver, British Columbia	Sandor Kovacs (through 1977); Al Tomko
All-Star Pro Wrestling	1962–early 1990s	Wellington, New Zealand	Steve Rickard
Big Time Wrestling	1964–1980	Detroit, Michigan	Ed Farhat (The Sheik); Francis Flesher
NWA Big Time Wrestling; World Class Championship Wrestling	1966–1986	Dallas, Texas	Jack Adkisson (Fritz Von Erich)
Big Time Wrestling	1968–1981	San Francisco, California	Roy Shire
Eastern Sports Association	1969–1977	Halifax, Nova Scotia	Al Zinck
World Championship Wrestling	1969–1978	Sydney, New South Wales	Jim Barnett
All Japan Pro Wrestling	1973–1986	Tokyo, Japan	Shohei Baba
NWA Southeast Championship Wrestling; Continental Championship Wrestling	1974–1987	Knoxville, Tennessee	Jim Barnett; Ron Fuller
Korean Wrestling Association	Mid 1970s–1983	Seoul, South Korea	Kim Ill
New Japan Pro-Wrestling	July 20, 1975 – 1985; 1992–1993; 2008–2010	Tokyo, Japan	Antonio Inoki (1972–1989); Seiji Sakaguchi (1989–1999); Tatsumi Fujinami (1999-June 2004); Masakazu Kusama (June 2004-June 2005); Simon Kelly Inoki (June 2005-April 2007); Naoki Sugabayashi (April 2007-September 2013); Kaname Tezuka (September 2013 – February 2016); Katsuhiko Harada (February 2016 – December 2023); Hiroshi Tanahashi (December 2023 – present)
Capitol Sports Promotions; World Wrestling Council	1979–1987	San Juan, Puerto Rico	Carlos Colón; Victor Jovica
NWA Polynesian Pro Wrestling	1979–1988	Honolulu, Hawaii	Peter Maivia (through 1982); Lia Maivia
Championship Wrestling from Georgia	1984-1985	Atlanta, Georgia	Ole Anderson
World Championship Wrestling	1988–1993	Atlanta, Georgia	Jim Herd (1988–1992); Kip Allen Frey (1992); Bill Watts (1992–1993); Eric Bischoff (1993)
Dominicana De Espectaculos	Late 1980s	Dominican Republic	Arcadio Disla Brito
NWA New Jersey; NWA Championship Wrestling America	1992–2000	New Jersey	Dennis Coralluzzo
Eastern Championship Wrestling	1993–1994	Philadelphia, Pennsylvania	Tod Gordon
NWA UK Hammerlock	1993–2013	United Kingdom; Ireland	Dean Champion
Smoky Mountain Wrestling	1994–1995	Tennessee; Kentucky; Virginia; West Virginia; North Carolina; South Carolina; Georgia	Jim Cornette; Sandy Scott
International Wrestling Association	1994–2001; 2007–2009	Puerto Rico	Víctor Quiñones; Juan Rivera
NWA Florida	1994–2005	South Florida	Howard Brody (through 2002); Joe Price; Ron Niemi
Pro Wrestling eXpress; NWA East	1995	Pennsylvania Michigan	Jim Miller
IWA Japan	1995–1996	Japan	Víctor Quiñones
Elite Canadian Championship Wrestling	1996	British Columbia	ECCW Entertainment Co. Ltd.
NWA Main Event	1997	Tennessee	Jason Womack
NWA Music City Wrestling; NWA Worldwide	1997–1999; 1999-Oct 2000	Tennessee	Bert Prentice
NWA 2000	1997–2001	North Carolina; New Jersey	Steve Corino; Marc Coralluzzo
Ohio Valley Wrestling	1997–2001	Indiana; Kentucky	Daniel Briley
Mid-Atlantic Championship Wrestling	1998	North Carolina; South Carolina	Ricky Nelson
NWA Midwest	1998	Illinois; Indiana; Iowa; Kansas; Missouri; Wisconsin; Florida; New Hampshire; Massachusetts	Rico Mann; Ed Chuman
Pennsylvania Wrestling Alliance	1998–2000	Pennsylvania	Robert Fischer; Torrence Tate; John Wickizer
NWA New York	1998–2000	New York	Carlina O'Brien; Richard O'Brien
NWA Northeast	1996–2000	New York; Connecticut	Michael O'Brien
NWA Michigan; NWA Great Lakes	1998–2002	Michigan	Gene Austin
Canadian Wrestling Federation	1998–2005	Manitoba	Ernie Todd
NWA Georgia	1998–2005	Alabama; Georgia; Tennessee	Bill Behrens
NWA West Virginia; NWA West Virginia/Ohio; NWA Tri-State	1998–2007	West Virginia; Ohio	Richard Arpin
NEO Japan Ladies Pro-Wrestling	2000–2010	Japan	Kyoko Inoue; Tetsuya Koda
NWA Southwest	1998–2011	Texas	Ken Taylor
NWA Germany	1999–2002	Germany; Austria	Franz Schumann
Island X-treme Wrestling Federation; NWA Hawaii	1999–2007	Hawaii	Parrish Ho; Joseph Tramontano
NWA Mid-South	1999–2009	Tennessee; Arkansas	Alvin Minnick
New England Championship Wrestling	2000	Massachusetts	Sheldon Goldberg
International Independent Wrestling; Impact Independent Wrestling	2000–2003	Rhode Island	Tim Boutin
NWA Fusion	2000–2013	Virginia	Rick O'Brien; Larry Horsley
NWA Absolute Entertainment	2009	Northern Michigan	James Allred; Gary "The Freak" Neeley
NWA Addicted; NWA Green Mountain	2004-May 2006; 2006; 2007	Vermont	Chad Merchant; Chad Peters
All-Star Championship Wrestling	2002–2012	Wisconsin	Jason Jerry
NWA All-Star Wrestling	2006–2012	Virginia	Stan Lee
Allied Powers Wrestling Federation	2008	Pennsylvania	Bubba Brewer
Alternative Pro Wrestling	2008–2012	Royston, Georgia	
Alternative Wrestling Show	2005–2012	California	Bart Kapitzke
NWA Anarchy	2005	Georgia	Jerry Palmer; Franklin Dove
NWA Ark-La-TX	2012–2014	Longview, Texas	Phillip Sullivan
NWA Australian Wrestling Alliance	2011	Brisbane, Queensland, Australia	
NWA Battle Zone	2002–2012	Mississippi	Denny McLain
NWA Bluegrass	2002	Kentucky	Kenny McCoy
NWA Blue Ridge	2004–2005	Virginia	James Gillenwater
NWA Bodyslam	2011–2012	Texas	Rudy Boy Gonzales
NWA Brew City Wrestling	2009–2011	Wisconsin	Frankie DeFalco
NWA California	2004–2006	Central California	Zack Reeb
NWA Capital	2009–2012	Albany, New York	Frank Chiofalo
NWA Carolinas	2007–2010	North Carolina	Eldon Speer
Central States Wrestling	2001–2008	Kansas; Missouri	Joseph McDonald
Championship Pro Wrestling	2006–2007	Oregon	Sam Simms; Kevin Brandt
NWA Championship Wrestling From Hollywood	2010–2012	California	David Marquez
Championship Wrestling from Florida	2003–2012	Northern Florida	Kevin Rhodes
Championship Wrestling Incorporated	2008	West Virginia	
NWA Charlotte	2009	North Carolina	J. D. Costello
NWA Chattanooga	2010–2012	Tennessee	
NWA Cold Front	1997–2007	New England	Ellen Magliaro
NWA Coastal	2011–2012	New Jersey	Phil Varlese
Dakota Pro Wrestling	2010–2012	North Dakota; South Dakota	Brian Walther
NWA DAWG (Dangerous Adrenaline Wrestling Gladiators)	2010–2013	New Jersey	Lawrence Zirconium
Deep Southern Championship Wrestling	2011–2012	Georgia	
Dynamo Pro Wrestling	2008–2012	Kansas; Missouri	Jim Yount
NWA Empire	2004–2008	New York	Jill Rosario (2004–2008); Dave Ann (2008)
Empire Wrestling Federation	2006–2012	California	Jesse Hernandez
Explosive Pro Wrestling	2006–2012	Perth, Australia	
Explosive Pro Wrestling-Adelaide	2008–2011	Adelaide, Australia	
NWA Force One Pro Wrestling	2009–2012	New Jersey	Johnny Calzone
NWA Full Throttle Action	2011–2012	Oklahoma	Will Peden
Fusion Pro Wrestling	2008–2009	Colorado	Victoria Star; Billy Roberts; Jeff Michaels
NWA Great Championship Wrestling	2004–2007	Georgia	Jerry Oates
NWA Great Lakes Wrestling	2009	Michigan	Anthony Watson, Nate Mattson, Brian Dunn, Great Lakes Broadcasting Group
Gulf Coast Wrestling Alliance	2008–2009	Texas	Ben Galvan
High Risk Wrestling	2007	California	Matt Jackson
International Catch Wrestling Alliance; NWA France	2002	France	Daniel Jalbert
Frontier Championship Wrestling	2010–2011	Illinois	Richard Bonjour
Impact Zone Wrestling	2008–2010	Arizona	Steve Greyeyes Islas
NWA Indiana	2005–2010	Indiana	Shawn Cook; Guy Lombardo; Marc Houston
Inoki Genome Federation	2007	Japan	Antonio Inoki
Insane Championship Wrestling		Wisconsin	
NWA Intermountain Wrestling Revolution	2012–2013	Salt Lake City, Utah	Brad Lisenby
IWA Mid-South		Illinois	Ian Rotten
NWA Ireland	2004–2008	Ireland	Paul Tracey
NWA Korea	2006–2017	South Korea	Lee Whang Pyo
NWA Liberty States	2012–2013	New Jersey	Ricky Otazu
NWA Lone Star	2011–2012	Texas	Tony Brooklyn
NWA Lucha Chicago	2010	Illinois	
Mach One Wrestling	2008–2012	California	John Ian
Metro Pro Wrestling	2010–2012	Kansas	Chris Gough
NWA Mexico	2008–2008; 2008–2013	Mexico	Blue Demon, Jr. Daniel Acevas
Mid-American Wrestling	2004–2007	Wisconsin	Carmine DeSpirito
Mr. Chainsaw Pro Wrestling	2008	Kalkaska, Michigan	Hardcore Harry
Mountain Empire Championship Wrestling		Virginia	
NWA New Beginnings	2009–2010	Charlotte, North Carolina	Greg Price
NWA New South	2003–2008	Mississippi	Bob Serio
NWA No Limits Wrestling	2003–2009	Muscatine, Iowa	Doug Ritter; Scott Ritter
North American Wrestling Association		Georgia	
NWA North Jersey	2004–2005	Northern New Jersey	El Bandido
NWA Northern Championship Wrestling	2009	Lansing, Michigan	
NWA On Fire	2008	New Jersey; Maine; Connecticut	Mario Savoldi; Tommy Savoldi
NWA Optimum	2009–2010	Illinois	Jon Kmetz
Paradise Pro Wrestling; Lucha Americana International	2009	Texas	
NWA Platinum	2009–2010	Indiana	
NWA Premier	2011–2013	West Virginia	Chance Prophet
NWA ProSouth Wrestling	2011	Alabama	Terry Batey
NWA Pro Wrestling	2005	California; Colorado; Arizona; Utah; Australia	David Marquez
Pro Wrestling Evolution		Georgia	
Pro Wrestling Fusion	2009–2011	Florida	Joseph Cabibbo
NWA Pro Wrestling Krush	2010	Milwaukee, Wisconsin	Rasche Brown
Pro Wrestling Next	2009	Iowa	
Pro Wrestling Revolution	2008–2012	Northern California	Gabriel Ramirez
NWA Quebec Pro Wrestling	2004–2010	Quebec	Rodney Kellman
Rebellious Wrestling Federation	2009–2010	Illinois	Sean David
Pro Wrestling Zero-One; Pro Wrestling Zero1	2001–2004; 2011	Japan	Shinya Hashimoto & Yoshiyuki Nakamura; Yoshiyuki Nakamura & Shinjiro Ohtani
NWA Ring Warriors	2011	Florida	Howard Brody
Rising Phoenix Wrestling	2007	Arizona	Earnest Guill
NWA Rocky Mountain	2002–2003	Utah	Mike Esposito
NWA Rocky Top	2005	Tennessee	James Strange
Scottish Wrestling Alliance	2004–2008	Scotland	Pete Murphy
NWA: Cyberspace; NWA Shockwave	2005–2006; 2006–2007	New Jersey	Billy & Daisy Firehawk
SoCal Pro Wrestling	2008–2012	Oceanside, California	Jeff Dino
NWA South Atlantic	2003–2009	Orlando, Florida	Steve Michaels; D.J. Jeff
Sunray Pro Wrestling	2003–2004	Florida	Mike Tyler
NWA Alabama Pro Wrestling; NWA Xtreme	2002–2004	Alabama	Kevin Brannen
NWA: Total Nonstop Action	2002–2004	Tennessee; Florida	Jeff Jarrett; Jerry Jarrett
Ultimate NWA	2003	Alabama	Will Owens
NWA Ultra Championship Wrestling-Zero	2003	Utah	Steve Neilson
Universal Fighting-Arts Organization	1999	Japan	Antonio Inoki
NWA Universal	2003	Oklahoma	Christopher Fox
NWA Wisconsin	2003–2012	Wisconsin	Jason Jerry
Upstate Pro Wrestling	2004–2013	Upstate New York	Jill Rosario (2004–2008); Dave Ann (2008); Chip Stetson (2008–present)
West Coast Wrestling Connection	2005	Oregon	Jeff Manning/Pat Kelly
NWA Wrestle Birmingham	2005	Alabama	Linda Marx
NWA Top Rope	2005–2013	Tennessee	Mike Sircy
NWA Wales	2006–2007		
NWA Bayou Independent Wrestling	2007	Louisiana Mississippi	Josh Newell
NWA Washington	2007–2008	Washington	
NWA Underground	2007–2011	Indiana	Merle Ramsey; Eric King
Undisputed Championship Wrestling	2008	Pennsylvania	Chris Ashton
NWA Insanity	2009	Milwaukee, Wisconsin	
NWA Unleashed	2009	Fond du Lac, Wisconsin	
NWA Supreme	2009–2011	Illinois	David Cavazos
Victory Independent Pro Wrestling	2009–2011	Michigan	
NWA New Revolution Wrestling	2010	Denver, Colorado	Matt Yaden
NWA WildKat	2011	Louisiana	Luke Hawx; Orlando Jordan
Total Wrestling Explosion	2011–2012	Mississippi	
NWA Wild West	2011–2012	Arizona	
Xplosion Nacional de Lucha Libre	2011–2012	Chile	
NWA WarZone	2012	Victoria, Australia	Ben Gilbert
NWA Velocity	2012	Austin, Texas	Austin Rhodes
Total Championship Wrestling		Austin, Texas	John Peterson
Xtreme Limit Wrestling		Wisconsin	Chad Vandermark
NWA Supreme		Southern Indiana	Jeremy Bevins
NWA Mid West		Marion, Ohio	James J. Martin
NWA Atlanta	2011	Atlanta, Georgia	Jackie Marler
NWA Florida Wrestling Alliance	2011	St. Petersburg, Florida	
NWA Branded Outlaw Wrestling	2012	San Antonio, Texas	Ray Aikens/Clint Hansen
NWA Central States Championship Wrestling	2013	East St. Louis, Illinois	Charles Wilcox
NWA Next Level Wrestling	2013	Knoxville, Tennessee	Devin Driscoll
NWA Appalachia	2014	West Virginia	Tyson Smith
NWA Mid South Pro Wrestling	2014	South Carolina	Darrell Freeman
NWA Combat Sport	2015	Pensacola, Florida	Travis Edgeworth/Lucha Locura
NWA Blue Collar Wrestling	2015	Oregon	
NWA Big Apple	June 2016	New York New JerseyConnecticut	Andrew Anderson / Ebenezer Baldwin Bowles
Diamond Stars Wrestling	2016	Tokyo, Japan	
American Wrestling Entertainment	2004-2005	New England	Dan Lussier
NWA Old School Wrestling	2013	Odessa, Texas	Fred Urban III
NWA Mid-Atlantic Championship Wrestling	2012	North Carolina	Vinnie Vain
NWA Smoky Mountain	2004-2017	Kingsport, Tennessee	Tony Givens
NWA Southern All-Star Wrestling	2007	Nashville, Tennessee	Jason Womack
NWA Texas Stampede Wrestling	2013	Balch Springs, Texas	James Beard
NWA Texoma	2011	Ardmore, Oklahoma	Robert Langdon
NWA Top of Texas	2011	Amarillo, Texas	Jack Kelso
NWA Vendetta Pro Wrestling	2014-2017	California Nevada	Billy Blade; Joseph Duncan
NWA World Class	2009	Rio Grande Valley, Texas	Carmine DeSpirito
NWA Wrestling Revolution	2007	McAllen, Texas	James Dante
NWA Wrecking Ball Wrestling	2007	Wichita, Kansas Frisco, Texas	Tony Martin
Xtreme Latin American Wrestling	2007	Mexico City, Mexico	Ernesto Ocampo
Carolina Wrestling Entertainment	2007	Greensboro, North Carolina	Richie Blaisdell
NWA Exodus Pro Midwest	2023–2025	Cleveland, Ohio	Michael Hutter
