= The Great Bolo =

American professional wrestler (1916–1984)

Personal information
- Born: Al Lovelock

Professional wrestling career
- Ring name(s): Al Lovelock; Bolo; The Great Bolo
- Debut: 1950s
- Retired: 1960s

Alexander Charles Newman (August 16, 1916 – August 28, 1984) was a Canadian professional wrestler known by the ring names Al Lovelock and The Great Bolo. Lovelock was born in Windsor, Ontario and was active in the 1950s and 1960s and was primarily known for his work in the Carolinas, Georgia, and Florida. Lovelock was the first to use the name "the Great Bolo" but would later allow Tom Renesto to use the name as well. He is the younger brother of politician Bernard Newman. Died August 28, 1984.

== Professional wrestling career ==
Al Lovelock began wrestling in the late 1940s under his real name. In 1950 he worked for Dory Funk's "NWA Western States" territory, teaming with Danny McShain. The duo reached the finals of a tournament to crown new NWA Texas Tag Team Champions but lost to Rito Romero and Miguel Guzmán. In 1953 Lovelock had travelled to Hawaii and worked for NWA Hawaii, winning the promotions main title, the NWA Hawaii Heavyweight Championship from Ben Sharpe on February 14, 1954. Three months later Lovelock vacated the title and left the promotion.

While working in Hawaii Lovelock had also begun working for the Los Angeles NWA territory as "The Great Bolo", a masked villain. Together with Tom Rice they held the International Television Tag Team Championship, which they won from Wilbur Snyder and Sandor Szabo. Bolo and Rice would hold the International Tag Team title one more time in 1955. After working in the Los Angeles area for a couple of years the Great Bolo moved on to Texas, returning to Dory Funk's Western States territory. Bolo would beat Dory Funk himself for the Amarillo version of the NWA North American Heavyweight Championship on February 7, 1957. A week later he defeated Funk for the NWA Southwest Junior Heavyweight Championship as well becoming a doubles champion. His double title reign only last two weeks before Dory Funk won both titles back. Bolo would go on to win the promotion's Southwest Tag Team Championship three times, each with a different partner: Dizzy Davis, Art Nelson and Tokyo Joe. In 1958 Tokyo Joe left the promotion forcing Bolo to team up with Kurt Von Poppenheim to lose the tag team titles to Ricky Romero and Dory Funk.

From Texas Bolo moved on to the Gulf region of the South Eastern United States working for the local promotions NWA Gulf Coast and NWA Mid-America. On April 20, 1960, Bolo and partner Joe McCarthy won the NWA Gulf Coast Tag Team Championship and the NWA Mid-America Southern Tag Team Championship, both held by Bobby and Don Fields. A week later Bolo and McCarthy lost the titles back to the Fields brothers and split up. After this Lovelock began working with Tom Renesto who had been Lovelock's manager in Los Angeles. Renesto took the name "the Mighty Bolo" and the two became a tag team known as "the Bolos".

When Lovelock moved to another territory he gave Renesto permission to work as the Great Bolo in the area since he was booked to work in Texas. In those days it was not uncommon for several people to use the same gimmick in various territories, often leading to confusing records on who wrestled where, Renesto worked as the Great Bolo in the Carolinas, mainly for Jim Crockett Promotions (JCP) while Lovelock worked all over the country. Renesto made "The Missouri Mauler" Larry Hamilton his tag-team partner giving him the "Mighty Bolo" name. Renesto was so popular as the Great Bolo that Al Lovelock sued promoter Jim Crockett to get a part of the profits that his creation had earned. Later on Hamilton's brother Jody Hamilton started to team with Renesto as The Assassins, but the Bolo name was so popular in JCP that the two worked as the Great Bolo and the Mighty Bolo for a while to capitalize on the popularity of the Bolo gimmick.

Lovelock would go on to recruit Pepper Martin to work alongside him as "the Mighty Bolo" forming another Bolos team, the team would work together until Lovelock retired in the late 1960s. After his retirement Lovelock discovered and trained Gary Fletcher aka Man Mountain Mike for a professional wrestling career.

== Championships and accomplishments ==
- Gulf Coast Championship Wrestling
  - NWA Gulf Coast Tag Team Championship (1 time)
- NWA Mid-America
  - NWA Mid-America Southern Tag Team Championship (2 times) - Joe McCarthy
- NWA Mid-Pacific Promotions
  - NWA Hawaii Heavyweight Championship (1 time)
- NWA Western States
  - NWA North American Heavyweight Championship (Amarillo version) (1 time)
  - NWA Southwest Junior Heavyweight Championship (1 time)
  - NWA. Southwest Tag Team Championship (Amarillo version) (3 times) - with Dizzy Davies (1), Art Nelson (1), Tokyo Joe (1)
- Worldwide Wrestling Associates
  - WWA International Television Tag Team Championship (2 times) - with Tom Rice
