= Frankie Cain =

American professional wrestler (1932–2026)

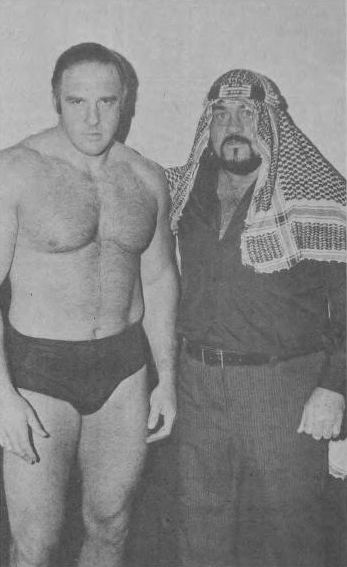
- Cain as Great Mephisto, managing Mark Lewin in Georgia Championship Wrestling in 1980

Personal information
- Born: James Ault; August 13, 1932 Columbus, Ohio, U.S.
- Died: February 2, 2026 (aged 93)

Professional wrestling career
- Ring name: Frankie Cain; Great Mephisto; Inferno #1; Mr. Smith; El Diablo
- Billed height: 5 ft 9 in (1.75 m)
- Billed weight: 251 lb (114 kg)
- Billed from: Middle East
- Debut: 1960
- Retired: 1982

James Ault (August 13, 1932 – February 2, 2026), known as Frankie Cain, was an American professional wrestler. He wrestled under the ring name Great Mephisto for most of his career. He also worked as Inferno #1.

== Professional wrestling career ==
Cain began his wrestling career in 1960 Mississippi. Early in his career he wrestled as a babyface in Tennessee and Alabama.

In 1965, Cain formed a tag team called The Infernos, as Inferno #1, together with Rocky Smith (Inferno #2) and J. C. Dykes as their manager. Cain wore a wrestling shoe with a large heel on it, which would eventually become known as "the loaded boot" and was used against various opponents. Due to the Infernos having identical appearances, he was often identified as the Clubfoot Inferno. While the boot was helpful in wrestling, wearing it caused strain on Cain's hip, so Smith would wear the boot until his hip began to feel the strain. The team wore identical blue and black masks with matching tights. The team first came together in Tennessee in 1965. They later went to Florida in 1966-1967 and became famous in Georgia. The team captured the NWA Georgia Southern Tag Team Titles on April 1, 1966. It is said that they lost the titles the same month, but they may have continued to defend the titles regardless. The team then struck gold again in Georgia, capturing the NWA Georgia World Tag Team Championship on June 10, 1966. The team lost the titles a week later on June 17, but regained the title later in the month. Their second reign lasted into August, though the exact date they lost it is unknown. The team then traveled to various territories around the United States. The team captured the NWA Southern Tag Team Championship and held onto it until it was held up in August 1967. In Spring 1968, the Infernos were involved in an angle where imposter Infernos appeared. The two teams feuded in a masks vs titles match and later the imposter Infernos were revealed to be Bobby Fields and Lee Fields. The team captured the NWA Amarillo World Tag Team Championship on September 26, 1968 (and also captured the NWA World Texas Tag Team Championship the same day) and lost the titles on October 17, 1968.

After leaving the Infernos in 1969, he became The Great Mephisto, a Middle Eastern heel. He had successful stints in Florida, Texas, Georgia and San Francisco under the gimmick. He lost to NWA World Heavyweight Champion Dory Funk Jr. on November 18, 1969 in Floridia.

In 1980, he worked for All Japan Pro Wrestling as The Sheik's tag team partner.

He retired from wrestling in 1982.

== Personal life and death ==
Cain was born in Columbus, Ohio, on August 13, 1932. In 2016, Ault released an autobiography with Scott Teal called Shooting with the Legends about Cain's life and career in wrestling, published by Crowbar Press. On October 24, 2020, Ault and Teal released another autobiography Raising Cain: From Jimmy Ault to Kid McCoy Part 1. On February 21, 2025, Raising Cain: From The Inferno to The Great Mephisto Part 2 was released.

Ault died on February 2, 2026, at the age of 93.

== Championships and accomplishments ==
- Championship Wrestling from Florida
  - NWA Southern Heavyweight Championship (Florida version) (1 time)
  - NWA Florida Tag Team Championship (4 times) with Inferno #2
- Georgia Championship Wrestling
  - NWA Georgia Southern Tag Team Championship (1 time)
  - NWA Georgia World Tag Team Championship (1 time)
- Mid-Atlantic Wrestling
  - NWA Mid-Atlantic Tag Team Championship (1 time)
- Western States Sports
  - NWA Amarillo World Tag Team Championship
  - NWA Western States Tag Team Championship
  - NWA Texas World Tag Team Championship
