= J. C. Dykes and the Infernos =

Tag team
- Members: Inferno #1 (Frankie Cain); Inferno #1 (Curtis Smith); Inferno #1 (Karl Von Brauner); Inferno #2 (Rocky Smith); Inferno #3 (Mike McManus); J. C. Dykes (Manager)
- Years active: 1965-1974

J. C. Dykes and the Infernos (also known as the Masked Infernos) were a popular professional wrestling act in the 1960s and 1970s.

== Information ==
The team consisted of Inferno #1 (Frankie Cain) and Inferno #2 (Rocky Smith) with J. C. Dykes as their manager. The team wore identical blue and black masks with matching tights. The team first came together in Tennessee in 1965. They later went to Florida in 1966-1967 and became famous in Georgia. The team captured the NWA Georgia Southern Tag Team Titles on April 1, 1966. It is said that they lost the titles the same month, but they may have continued to defend the titles regardless. The team then struck gold again in Georgia, capturing the NWA Georgia World Tag Team Championship on June 10, 1966. The team lost the titles a week later on June 17, but regained the title later in the month. Their second reign lasted into August, though the exact date they lost it is unknown. The team then traveled to various territories around the United States. The team captured the NWA Southern Tag Team Championship and held onto it until it was held up in August 1967. In Spring 1968, the Infernos were involved in an angle where imposter Infernos appeared. The two teams feuded in a masks vs titles match and later the imposter Infernos were revealed to be Bobby Fields and Lee Fields. The team captured the NWA Amarillo World Tag Team Championship on September 26, 1968 (and also captured the NWA World Texas Tag Team Championship the same day) and lost the titles on October 17, 1968. Frankie Cain, who portrayed Inferno #1 left the team around 1969, and Smith's brother, Curtis Smith, took over the Inferno #1 name. The Infernos captured the NWA Florida Tag Team Championship on January 4, 1971, and held them until February 16, 1971. 5 months later, The team won the NWA Western States Tag Team Championship on August 4, 1971, but lost them a week later on August 11, 1971. The team re-captured the NWA Florida Tag Team Championship on January 10, 1972, then lost the titles on February 15, 1972. The team final runs came in NWA Hollywood Wrestling in 1975 and New Japan Pro Wrestling in 1976, with Mike McManus as Inferno #3, teaming up with Curtis Smith (Inferno #2) and Karl Von Brauner (Inferno #1).

== Members ==
=== Inferno #1 (Frankie Cain) ===
Prior to the Infernos, Cain wrestled as a babyface wrestler in Tennessee and Alabama. As Inferno #1, with Rocky Smith as his tag team partner, Frankie wore a wrestling shoe with a large heel on it, which would eventually become known as "the loaded boot" and was used against various opponents. Due to the Infernos having identical appearances, he was often identified as the Clubfoot Inferno. While the boot was helpful in wrestling, wearing it caused strain on his hip, so Rocky Smith would wear the boot until his hip began to feel the strain. Cain had a successful career after leaving the Infernos as he became, the Great Mephisto, a Middle Eastern heel. He had successful stints in Florida, Texas, Georgia and San Francisco under the gimmick.

=== Inferno #1 (Curtis Smith) ===
Smith wrestled in a tag team called the "Blue Demons", prior to joining the Infernos. After Smith's run with the Infernos ended, he created, "The Super Infernos". The team found success in Georgia and then Smith moved over to Gulf Coast Championship Wrestling to wrestle as, "The Mighty Yankee". He later found himself in another tag team with the Mighty Yankee #2, Jerry Miller. The team captured the NWA Gulf Coast Tag Team Championship in 1975 and later, The Mighty Yankee #3 replaced The Mighty Yankee #2. Smith went to NWA Hollywood Wrestling to form the Infernos again with Inferno #3 then the pair toured New Japan Pro Wrestling in 1976. The pair changed their name to "The Challengers" upon going to Gulf Coast Championship Wrestling in June and July 1976. Smith changed gimmicks again, interchangeably switching between "The Cuban Assassin #2" and "The Executioner" through the rest of 1976 and into 1977. Smith captured the NWA Mid-America Heavyweight Championship on April 15, 1977, and lost the title to Jackie Fargo in May 1977. Smith headed over to Central States Wrestling towards the end of 1977 as "The Blue Yankee" then revived "The Executioner" gimmick in Fall 1978 in Japan. Smith then had his last major run as "The Mighty Yankee" from 1978 to 1979 for Southeastern Championship Wrestling.

=== Inferno #1 (Karl Von Brauner) ===
Karl Von Brauner wrestled as Inferno #1 in NWA Hollywood Wrestling from 1975-76. He was later unmasked as an Inferno and was revealed to be Karl Von Brauner.

=== Inferno #2 (Rocky Smith) ===
Smith started wrestling towards the end of the 1950s and was mostly used as a lower card talent. Smith captured the NWA Southern Junior Heavyweight Championship in November 1964, which Frankie Cain had also held. He was part of the original Infernos team and stayed with it until its end in 1974. He then went back to wrestling as Rocky Smith for Southeastern Championship Wrestling, only seeing limited success.

=== Inferno #3 (Mike McManus) ===
Little is known of McManus' career due to McManus often wrestling under masks. He wrestled as "Bruiser" McManus and was a journeyman wrestler. He made appearances as Inferno #3 as early as 1967 for NWA Mid-America and was part of the Infernos team from 1975-1976 in NWA Hollywood Wrestling and in New Japan Pro Wrestling. He later became Cliff Von Brauner for NWA Hollywood Wrestling and teamed up with Curtis Smith as "The Challengers".

=== J. C. Dykes ===
James Clayton Dykes (better known as J. C. Dykes; 1926 - November 20, 1993) - Dykes was originally a referee for Roy Welch and Nick Gulas in the 1960s. He had red hair and wore a black tuxedo. Dykes notably carried a whistle and a canteen that were often used in matches and also sometimes carried a flashlight to give "signals" to his wrestlers. Dykes was also known for throwing fireballs at opponents. Aside from the Infernos, Dykes managed other wrestlers including The Mighty Yankees, The Dominoes, The Zodiac and The Champion. Dykes also stepped in the ring several times in special matches as the Infernos' manager and wrestled under the name, "Senor X" in NWA Hollywood Wrestling. Dykes quit wrestling in 1976 after nearly being involved in the car crash that killed Sam Bass, Pepe Lopez and Frank Hester. Dykes later became a born-again Christian in 1977 and died in 1993.

== Other uses of the Infernos ==
Due to the Infernos wearing masks and due to the popularity of the gimmick, the gimmick was easily recreated several times in various promotions. The Blue Infernos, who had similar names and wore similar colors, wrestled for NWA Mid-America in 1966-67. Bobby Fields and Lee Fields portrayed the imposter Infernos in 1969. The second Inferno #1, Curtis Smith, would later form, "The Super Infernos" with Doug Gilbert in Georgia in 1973. The Infernos gimmick was later revived in Smoky Mountain Wrestling and on the independent circuit in 1994.

== Championships and accomplishments ==
=== The Infernos (Frankie Cain and Curtis Smith) ===
- Championship Wrestling from Florida
  - NWA Florida Tag Team Championship
- Georgia Championship Wrestling
  - NWA Georgia Southern Tag Team Championship
  - NWA Georgia World Tag Team Championship
- Mid-Atlantic Wrestling
  - NWA Mid-Atlantic Tag Team Championship
- Western States Sports
  - NWA Amarillo World Tag Team Championship
  - NWA Western States Tag Team Championship
  - NWA Texas World Tag Team Championship

=== The Infernos (Curtis and Rocky Smith) ===
- Championship Wrestling from Florida
  - NWA Florida Tag Team Championship
- Western States Sports
  - NWA Western States Tag Team Championship
