= Sammy Steamboat =

American professional wrestler (1934–2006)

Personal information
- Born: Samuel K. Mokuahi; May 4, 1934 Honolulu, Hawaii, U.S.
- Died: May 2, 2006 (aged 71) Honolulu, Hawaii, U.S.
- Cause of death: Complications from Alzheimer's disease
- Spouse: Sheryll Mokuahi
- Children: 9

Professional wrestling career
- Ring name(s): Sam Steamboat; Sammy Steamboat
- Billed height: 5 ft 10 in (1.78 m)
- Billed weight: 230 lb (104 kg)
- Trained by: Lord James Blears; Lou Thesz
- Debut: 1956
- Retired: 1978

Samuel K. Mokuahi (May 4, 1934 – May 2, 2006) was an American professional wrestler, better known by his ring name, Sammy Steamboat.

== Early life ==
Mokuahi grew up in Honolulu, attending President Theodore Roosevelt High School, where he played multiple sports.

== Professional wrestling career ==
Mokuahi was trained to wrestle by Lord James Blears and Lou Thesz. He debuted in the 1950s, adopting the ring name "Sam Steamboat,” the English translation of his birth name.

Steamboat began his career with the Honolulu-based promotion 50th State Big Time Wrestling. He won his first championship on August 5, 1956, teaming with Billy Varga to defeat Great Togo and Tosh Togo for the NWA Hawaii Tag Team Championship. On January 25, 1961, Steamboat defeated Dick Hutton to win the NWA Hawaii Heavyweight Championship. He lost the championship to Luigi Macera on April 15, 1961.

In the early 1960s, Steamboat relocated to the contiguous United States, where he competed for the Los Angeles, California–based promotion Worldwide Wrestling Associates. In 1960, he won the WWA International Television Tag Team Championship with Dick Hutton.

Steamboat went on to compete in the Atlanta, Georgia–based Georgia Championship Wrestling, where he won the NWA Southern Tag Team Championship (Georgia version) with Eddie Graham in 1964, and the North Carolina–based Mid Atlantic Championship Wrestling, where he held the NWA Southern Tag Team Championship (Mid-Atlantic version) with Graham in 1965.

In the mid-1960s, Steamboat began wrestling for Championship Wrestling from Florida, where he reformed his alliance with Eddie Graham. Steamboat won the NWA World Tag Team Championship (Florida version) on five occasions between 1964 and 1967, as well as the NWA World Tag Team Championship (Mid-America version) on two occasions in 1965 and the NWA Florida Tag Team Championship in 1969.

Steamboat returned to Hawaii in the late 1960s, winning the NWA Hawaii Heavyweight Championship on three further occasions and the NWA Hawaii Tag Team Championship on four further occasions. He also won the NWA North American Championship (Hawaii version) on four occasions. He retired in the late 1970s.

== Personal life ==
Mokuahi was married to Sheryll, with whom he had seven children.

Mokuhai was an avid surfer and canoeist.

Fellow professional wrestler Ricky Steamboat took his ring name from Mokuahi due to their resemblance and was briefly billed as his younger brother, son or nephew. However, the two men were unrelated.

== Death ==
Mokuahi died in Hawaii from complications from Alzheimer's disease on May 2, 2006.

== Championships and accomplishments ==
- 50th State Big Time Wrestling
  - NWA Hawaii Heavyweight Championship (4 times)
  - NWA Hawaii Tag Team Championship (5 times) – with Billy Varga (1 time), Bearcat Wright (1 time), Peter Maivia (2 times), and Billy White Wolf (1 time)
  - NWA North American Heavyweight Championship (Hawaii version) (4 times)
- Championship Wrestling from Florida
  - NWA Florida Tag Team Championship (1 time) – with Ciclon Negro
  - NWA World Tag Team Championship (Florida version) (5 times) – with Eddie Graham (3 times), Ron Etchison (1 time), and Jose Lothario (1 time)
  - NWA World Tag Team Championship (Mid-America version) (1 time) – with Eddie Graham^{1}
- Georgia Championship Wrestling
  - NWA Southern Tag Team Championship (Georgia version) (4 times) – with Eddie Graham
- Mid-Atlantic Championship Wrestling
  - NWA Southern Tag Team Championship (Mid-Atlantic version) (1 time) – with Eddie Graham
- NWA Western States Sports
  - NWA World Tag Team Championship (Amarillo version) (1 time) - with Eddie Graham
- Worldwide Wrestling Associates
  - WWA International Television Tag Team Championship (1 time) - with Dick Hutton

^{1}Steamboat and Graham won this championship by winning a tournament held on a card promoted in the Championship Wrestling from Florida promotion.
