= NWA World Tag Team Championship (Amarillo version) =

Professional wrestling tag team championship

- The Amarillo version of the championship belt

Details
- Promotion: NWA Western States Sports
- Date established: 1955
- Date retired: March 1969
Statistics
- First champions: Reggie Lisowski and Art Neilson
- Most reigns: Team: Mike DiBiase/Danny Plechas, Dory Funk Sr./Bob Geigel, Dory Funk Jr. and Terry Funk (3 reigns); Individual: Art Nelson (7 reigns)

The Amarillo version (or West Texas version) of the NWA World Tag Team Championship was the main tag team professional wrestling championship for the Amarillo, Texas-based Western States Sports promotion, a member of the National Wrestling Alliance (NWA). Promoters Doc Sarpolis and Dory Funk introduced the championship in 1955 and continued to use it as their main tag team championship until 1969. The NWA Board of Directors dictated that there would be only one NWA World Heavyweight Champion but allowed any NWA member, also known as a NWA territory, to create its own local version of the NWA World Tag Team Championship. In 1957 no less than 13 different versions of the NWA World Tag Team Championship were promoted across the United States.^{[Championships]} This even included another version in East Texas, which was used mainly in Houston and Fort Worth at the time.

To start the Amarillo lineage of the NWA World Tag Team Championship. Sarpolis and Funk invited Reggie Lisowski and Art Nelson, the holders of the Chicago version of the championship, to come to Amarillo and defend the championship. By November 1955 Lisowski stopped travelling to Amarillo so Nelson was given Rip Rogers as a partner, creating a separate lineage from the Chicago version as they continued to recognize Lisowski and Nelson as champions. The world tag team championship was actively promoted in and around Amarillo and Lubbock, Texas, from 1955 until March 1969. At that point the promotion abandoned the championship, opting to create the NWA Western States Tag Team Championship as the main tag team championship of the territory. Since the Amarillo version, like all other NWA World Tag Team Championships, were professional wrestling championships, it meant that the championship was not determined by competitive combat, but instead based on a predetermined match result.

The teams of Terry Funk and Dory Funk Jr., and Mike DiBiase and Danny Plechas, share the record for most reigns as a team, a total of three each. Art Nelson, one-half of the first championship team, held the title a total of eight times with various partners, the most of any individual. The Von Brauners' (Kurt Von Brauner and Karl Von Brauner) first reign lasted 140 days, the longest of any individual reign. The Von Brauners also hold the record for combined reigns as a team with a 166 days total for their two reigns. Individually, Nelson's eight reigns add up to at least 310 days, eclipsing any other wrestler. Due to incomplete records in regard to a number of championship changes, it is impossible to clearly identify the shortest reign; Great Bolo and Tokyo Joe's seven day reign in 1958 is the shortest confirmed reign.

== Title history ==
Key
No.	Overall reign number
Reign	Reign number for the specific champion
Days	Number of days held

No.	Champion	Championship change			Reign statistics		Notes	Ref.
No.	Champion	Date	Event	Location	Reign	Days	Notes	Ref.
1	Art Nelson and Reggie Lisowski	1955 (nlt) (Note: Indicates that a title change took place "no later than" the date listed. Documentation of the specific date of a title change is not found but documentation of the champion holding the title on that date/in that period.)	Live event	N/A (Note: The location of the match was not captured as part of the documentation.)	1	(Note: The length of this reign is too uncertain to calculate due to incomplete records.)	Lisowski and Neilson were recognized as the Chicago version of the NWA World Tag Team championship and were recognized in Amarillo.	
2	Art Nelson (2) and Rip Rogers	November 1955 (nlt)	Live event	N/A	1		Reggie Lisowski relinquishes his half of the title to Rogers (Lisowski and Neilson continue to be recognized in Chicago and other territories). Bob Geigel and Dory Funk defeated the champions on April 26, 1956, but results were reversed because Dizzy Davis substituted for Geigel during the match.	
3	Dizzy Davis and Sonny Myers	June 7, 1956	Live event	Amarillo, TX	1	130		
4	Art Nelson (3) and Rip Rogers	October 15, 1956 (nlt)	Live event	N/A	2	38	Nelson and Rogers won the championship sometime after July 12.	
5	Dory Funk and Bob Geigel	November 22, 1956	Live event	Amarillo, TX	1	88	This was a three-way tag team match, also involving the team of Bob Orton and John Tolos.	
6	Dory Funk (2) and Rip Rogers (3)	February 18, 1957	Live event	N/A	1	31	Funk chooses Rogers as a new partner after Bob Geigel leaves the territory.	
7	Great Bolo and Dizzy Davis (2)	March 21, 1957	Live event	Amarillo, TX	1	21		
8	Dizzy Davis (3) and Don Curtis	April 11, 1957	Live event	Amarillo, TX	1	(Note: The exact date the championship was vacated has not been documented, meaning the reign lasted between 51 and 80 days.)	Curtis and Davis defeated Great Bolo and Kurt Von Poppenheim to win the championship after Davis was allowed to choose a new tag team partner.	
—	Vacated	June 1957	—	—	—	—	The championship was vacated due to an injury to Don Curtis.	
9	Danny Plechas and Mike DiBiase	June 13, 1957	Live event	Amarillo, TX	1	40	DiBiase and Plechas defeated Bob Geigel and Dory Funk in a six-team tournament final to win the vacant championship.	
10	Dizzy Davis (4) and Sonny Myers	July 23, 1957	Live event	Odessa, TX	2	15		
11	Great Bolo (2) and Tokyo Joe	August 7, 1957	Live event	Wichita Falls, TX	1	(Note: The exact date that Bolo and Joe lost the championship has not been documented, meaning the reign lasted between 25 and 54 days.)		
12	Great Bolo (3) and Art Nelson (4)	September 1957	Live event	N/A	1	(Note: The exact date that Bolo and Nelson won the championship has not been documented, meaning the reign lasted between 45 and 74 days.)	Tokyo Joe was injured and replaced by Nelson before the title defense on September 5th in Amarillo, TX.	
13	Leo Garibaldi and Sonny Myers (3)	November 14, 1957	Live event	Amarillo, TX	1	28		
14	Danny Plechas and Mike DiBiase	December 12, 1957	Live event	Amarillo, TX	2	42		
—	Vacated	January 23, 1958	Live event	Amarillo, TX	—	—	The championship was vacated after a match against George Scott and Sandy Scott.	
15	Danny Plechas and Mike DiBiase	February 6, 1958	Live event	Amarillo, TX	3	(Note: The exact date the championship was vacated has not been documented, meaning the reign lasted between 54 and 83 days.)	DiBiase and Plechas defeated George Scott and Sandy Scott in a rematch to win the vacant championship.	
—	Vacated	April 1958	—	—	—	—	The championship was vacated after not being defended for 60 days.	
16	Cyclone Anaya and Ricky Romero	May 8, 1958	Live event	Lubbock, TX	1	49	Anaya and Romero defeated Art Nelson and Tokyo Joe in the finals of an eight-team tournament to win the vacant championship.	
17	Great Bolo (4) and Tokyo Joe	June 26, 1958	Live event	Amarillo, TX	2	7		
18	Kurt Von Poppenheim and Mighty Zorro	July 3, 1958	Live event	Amarillo, TX	1	13		
19	Art Nelson (5) and Mike DiBiase (4)	July 16, 1958	Live event	Lubbock, TX	1	84		
20	Gory Guerrero and Ricky Romero (2)	October 8, 1958	Live event	Lubbock, TX	1	22		
21	Art Nelson (6) and Danny Plechas (4)	October 30, 1958	Live event	Amarillo, TX	1	76		
22	The Fabulous Kangaroos (Al Costello and Roy Heffernan)	January 14, 1959	Live event	Lubbock, TX	1	(Note: The date the championship was lost has not been documented, meaning the reign lasted between 42 and 137 days.)	The Fabulous Kangaroos were still champions as of February 25th.	
Championship history is unrecorded from February 25 to before May 1959.
23	Gory Guerrero (2) and Sonny Myers (4)	May 1959 (nlt)	Live event	N/A	1			
24	Art Nelson (7) and Doug Donovan	May 27, 1959	Live event	Lubbock, TX	1	105		
25	Gory Guerrero (3) and Gordo Chihuahua	September 9, 1959	Live event	Lubbock, TX	1	(Note: The date the championship was lost has not been documented, meaning the reign lasted between <1 and 49 days.)		
Championship history is unrecorded from September 9 to before October 28, 1959.
26	Gory Guerrero (4) and Luis Hernandez	October 28, 1959 (nlt)	Live event	N/A	1			
27	Dory Funk (3) and Dick Hutton	November 25, 1959	Live event	Lubbock, TX	1	106		
28	Alex Perez and Mighty Ortega	March 10, 1960	Live event	Amarillo, TX	1	(Note: The date the championship was lost has not been documented, meaning the reign lasted between <1 and 82 days.)		
29	Dory Funk (4) and Dick Hutton	May 1960 (nlt)	Live event	N/A	2			
—	Vacated	May 1960	—	—	—	—	The championship was vacated when Dick Hutton was injured.	
30	Dory Funk (5) and Bob Geigel	May 25, 1960	Live event	Lubbock, TX	2	15	Funk and Geigel defeated Art Nelson and Nick Roberts to win the vacant championship.	
31	Art Nelson (8) and Nick Roberts	June 9, 1960	Live event	Amarillo, TX	1	(Note: The exact date the championship was vacated has not been documented, meaning the reign lasted between 22 and 49 days.)		
—	Vacated	July 1960	—	—	—	—	The championship was vacated when Art Nelson left the company.	
32	Joe Hamilton and Nick Roberts (2)	July 28, 1960	Live event	Amarillo, TX	1		Hamilton and Roberts defeated Mike DiBiase and Dr. X (Tommy O'Toole) to win the vacant championship.	
—	Vacated	after August 24, 1960	—	—	—	—	The championship was vacated after Hamilton injured his arm and was unable to defend the championship.	
33	Alex Perez (2) and Pancho Lopez	October 19, 1960	Live event	Lubbock, TX	1	35	Lopez and Perez defeated Antone Leone and Tony Morelli to win the vacant championship.	
34	Gory Guerrero (5) and Pancho Lopez (2)	November 23, 1960	Live event	N/A	1		Alex Perez gave his share of the title to Guerrero.	
Championship history is unrecorded from November 23, 1960 to August 16, 1962.
35	Gene Kiniski and Fritz Von Erich	August 16, 1962	Live event	N/A	1		Kiniski and Von Erich were the reigning holders of Southwest Title, start claiming the world title after defending the title against Dory Funk and Ricky Romero in Amarillo, TX on this day.	
Championship history is unrecorded from August 16, 1962 to before March 3, 1963.
36	Bob Stanlee and Steve Stanlee	March 3, 1963 (nlt)	Live event	N/A	1			
Championship history is unrecorded from before March 3, 1963 to August 11, 1964.
37	Jose Lothario and Pepper Gomez	August 11, 1964	Live event	El Paso, TX	1		Gomez and Lothario defeated the Medics for the vacant championship on July 15, 1964 in El Paso, Texas, but the decision is overturned when Medics protest. They defeated the Medics in a rematch to win the championship.	
Championship history is unrecorded from August 11, 1964 to before July 1, 1965.
38	Eddie Graham (4) and Sam Steamboat	July 1, 1965 (nlt)	Live event	N/A	1		Graham was formerly known as Rip Rogers.	
Championship history is unrecorded from July 1, 1965 to October 30, 1966.
39	Dory Funk Jr. and Terry Funk	October 30, 1966	Live event	Albuquerque, NM	1		Funk and Funk Jr. defeated Fritz Von Erich and Waldo Von Erich to win the vacant championship. Still champions as of December 15, 1966.	
Championship history is unrecorded from December 15, 1966 to May 1967.
40	Harley Race and Larry Hennig	May 1967	Live event	N/A	1		The AWA World Tag Team Championship were defended in the area between May and June 1967.	
41	Bearcat Wright and Thunderbolt Patterson	June 28, 1967 (nlt)	Live event	Denver, CO	1			
Championship history is unrecorded from before June 28 to before September 25, 1967.
42	Dr. Blood and The Medic	June 28, 1967 (nlt)	Live event	Denver, CO	1		Dr. Blood and The Medic defeated Dory Funk and Thunderbolt Patterson. The championship may also was billed as the North American Tag Team Championship.	
43	Gory Guerrero (6) and Luis Hernandez	November 6, 1967	Live event	El Paso, TX	2	9		
44	The Von Brauners (Karl Von Brauner and Kurt Von Brauner	November 15, 1967	Live event	Lubbock, TX	1	140		
45	Nick Bockwinkel and Ricky Romero (3)	April 3, 1968	Live event	Lubbock, TX	1	50		
46	The Von Brauners (Karl Von Brauner and Kurt Von Brauner	May 23, 1968	Live event	Amarillo, TX	2	26		
47	Dory Funk Jr. and Terry Funk	June 18, 1968	Live event	San Angelo, TX	2	100		
48	The Infernos (Inferno #1 and Inferno #2)	September 26, 1968	Live event	Amarillo, TX	1	21		
49	Dory Funk Jr. and Terry Funk	October 17, 1968	Live event	Amarillo, TX	3	48		
50	Chati Yokouchi and Mr. Ito	December 4, 1968	Live event	Lubbock, TX	1	(Note: The exact date the championship was deactivated has not been documented, meaning the reign lasted between 87 and 117 days.)		
—	Deactivated	March 1969	—	—	—	—	The championship was replaced by the NWA Western States Tag Team Championship.	

== Team reigns by combined length ==
Key

Symbol	Meaning
¤	The exact length of at least one title reign is uncertain, so the shortest possible length is used.

Rank	Team	No. of reigns	Combined days
1	The Von Brauners (Kurt Von Brauner and Karl Von Brauner)	2	166
2	Dizzy Davis and Sonny Myers	2	145
3	Mike DiBiase and Danny Plechas	3	136¤
4	Dory Funk and Dick Hutton	2	106¤
5	Art Nelson and Doug Donovan	1	105
6	Dory Funk and Bob Geigel	2	103
7	Chati Yokouchi and Mr. Ito	1	87¤
8	Mike DiBiase and Art Nelson	1	84
9	Art Nelson and Danny Plechas	1	76
10	Don Curtis and Dizzy Davis	1	73
11	Nick Bockwinkel and Ricky Romero	1	50
11	Ricky Romero and Cyclone Anaya	1	50
13	Great Bolo and Art Nelson	1	44¤
14	Dr. Blood and The Medic	1	42¤
15	Alex Perez and Pancho Lopez	1	35
16	Leo Garibaldi and Sonny Myers	1	28
16	Gory Guerrero and Luis Hernandez	1	28¤
18	Joe Hamilton and Nick Roberts	1	27
19	Great Bolo and Tokyo Joe	1	25¤
20	Gory Guerrero and Ricky Romero	1	22
21	Dizzy Davis and Great Bolo	1	21
21	The Infernos (Inferno #1 and Inferno #2)	1	21
23	Kurt Von Poppenheim and Mighty Zorro	1	13
24	Gory Guerrero and Luis Hernandez	1	9
25	Dory Funk Jr. and Terry Funk	3	8¤
26	Great Bolo and Tokyo Joe	1	7
27	Nick Roberts and Art Nelson	1	1¤
27	Gory Guerrero and Gordo Chihuahua	1	1¤
27	Gory Guerrero and Pancho Lopez	1	1¤
27	Gory Guerrero and Sonny Myers	1	1¤
27	Larry Hennig and Harley Race	1	1¤
27	The Fabulous Kangaroos (Al Costello and Roy Heffernan)	1	1¤
27	Mighty Ortega and Alex Perez	1	1¤
34	Art Nelson and Rip Rogers	2	¤
34	Dory Funk and Rip Rogers	1	¤
34	Gene Kiniski and Fritz Von Erich	1	¤
34	Reggie Lisowski and Art Nelson	1	¤
34	Eddie Graham and Sam Steamboat	1	¤
34	Thunderbolt Patterson and Bearcat Wright	1	¤
34	Bob and Steve Stanlee	1	¤
34	Pepper Gomez and Jose Lothario	1	¤

== Individual reigns by combined length ==
Key

Symbol	Meaning
¤	The exact length of at least one title reign is uncertain, so the shortest possible length is used.

Rank	Wrestler	No. of reigns	Combined days
1	Art Nelson	8	310¤
2	Dizzy Davis	4	239
3	Mike DiBiase	4	220¤
4	Danny Plechas	4	212¤
5	Dory Funk	5	209¤
6	Sonny Myers	4	174¤
7	Karl Von Brauner	2	166
7	Kurt Von Brauner	2	166
9	Ricky Romero	3	122
10	Dick Hutton	2	106¤
11	Doug Donovan	1	105
12	Bob Geigel	2	103
13	Great Bolo	4	97¤
14	Mr. Ito	1	87¤
14	Chati Yokouchi	1	87¤
16	Don Curtis	1	73
17	Gory Guerrero	6	62¤
18	Nick Bockwinkel	1	50
18	Cyclone Anaya	1	50
20	The Medic	1	42¤
20	Dr. Blood	1	42¤
22	Luis Hernandez	2	37¤
23	Pancho Lopez	2	36¤
23	Alex Perez	2	36¤
25	Tokyo Joe	2	32¤
26	Leo Garibaldi	1	28
26	Nick Roberts	2	28¤
28	Joe Hamilton	1	27
29	Inferno #1	1	21
29	Inferno #2	1	21
31	Kurt Von Poppenheim	1	13
31	Mighty Zorro	1	13
33	Dory Funk Jr.	3	8¤
33	Terry Funk	3	8¤
35	Gordo Chihuahua	1	1¤
35	Al Costello	1	1¤
35	Harley Race	1	1¤
35	Larry Hennig	1	1¤
35	Roy Heffernan	1	1¤
35	Mighty Ortega	1	1¤
41	Bob Stanlee	1	¤
41	Steve Stanlee	1	¤
41	Bearcat Wright	1	¤
41	Fritz Von Erich	1	¤
41	Gene Kiniski	1	¤
41	Jose Lothario	1	¤
41	Pepper Gomez	1	¤
41	Reggie Lisowski	1	¤
41	Eddie Graham / Rip Rogers	4	¤
41	Sam Steamboat	1	¤
41	Thunderbolt Patterson	1	¤

== Tournaments ==
=== 1957 ===
Quarterfinals
Dory Funk and Bob Geigel	W
Sonny Myers and Ivan Kolo
Roberto Pico and Rip Rogers	W
Rocky Columbo and Ray Piret
Mike Dibiase and Danny Plechas	W
Don Curtis and Dizzy Davis

Semifinals
Dory Funk and Bob Geigel	W
Roberto and Ivan Pico
Mike DiBiase and Danny Plechas	W
Bye

Finals
Dory Funk and Bob Geigel
Mike DiBiase and Danny Plechas	W

=== 1958 ===
Quarterfinals
Cyclone Anaya and Ricky Romero	W
Danny Savich and Don Evans
Tokyo Joe and Art Nelson	W
The Great Bolo and Joe Blanchard
Bob Geigel and Don Curtis	W
Bob Orton and Red Berry
Bull Curry	W
Alex Perez and Frankie Murdoch

Semifinals
Cyclone Anaya and Ricky Romero	W
Tokyo Joe and Art Nelson
Bob Geigel and Don Curtis
Bull Curry	Draw

Finals
Cyclone Anaya and Ricky Romero	W
Bye

== Concurrent championships ==
Sources for 13 simultaneous NWA World Tag Team Championships

- NWA World Tag Team Championship (Los Angeles version)
- NWA World Tag Team Championship (San Francisco version)
- NWA World Tag Team Championship (Central States version)
- NWA World Tag Team Championship (Chicago version)
- NWA World Tag Team Championship (Buffalo Athletic Club version)
- NWA World Tag Team Championship (Georgia version)
- NWA World Tag Team Championship (Iowa/Nebraska version)
- NWA World Tag Team Championship (Indianapolis version)
- NWA World Tag Team Championship (Salt Lake Wrestling Club version)
- NWA World Tag Team Championship (Amarillo version)
- NWA World Tag Team Championship (Minneapolis version)
- NWA World Tag Team Championship (Texas version)
- NWA World Tag Team Championship (Mid-America version)
