= NWA Southern Tag Team Championship (Georgia version) =

Professional wrestling tag team championship

Details
- Promotion: Georgia Championship Wrestling
- Date established: March 1949
- Date retired: November 1968
Statistics
- First champions: Chris and Babe Zaharias
- Final champions: Ramon and Alberto Torres
- Most reigns: Ramon and Alberto Torres (6 reigns)

The NWA Southern Tag Team Championship was the primary professional wrestling tag team title of the National Wrestling Alliance-affiliated Georgia Championship Wrestling. It was originally won by Chris and Babe Zaharias in Atlanta, Georgia in March 1949, and defended for almost twenty years until it was replaced by the NWA Georgia Tag Team Championship in 1968. This title was one of several regional NWA Southern Heavyweight Championships which included the Carolinas, Florida, Louisiana and Tennessee versions.

== Title history ==
| Wrestlers: | Times: | Date: | Location: | Notes: |
|---|---|---|---|---|
| Chris and Babe Zaharias | 1 | March 1949 | Atlanta, Georgia | |
| Nick Carter and Don McIntyre | 1 | March 25, 1949 | Atlanta, Georgia | |
Title history is unrecorded from April 1949 to August 1951.
| Art Neilson and Jack Steel | 1 | August 31, 1951 | Atlanta, Georgia | Defeated Farmer Jones and Al Massey for the title. |
Title history is unrecorded from September 1951 to May 1955.
| Red and Don McIntyre (2) | 1 | May 1955 | | |
Title history is unrecorded from May to September 1955.
| Whitney Whittler and El Toro | 1 | September 1955 | | |
Title history is unrecorded from September 1955 to March 1961.
| Skull Murphy and Gypsy Joe | 1 | March 14, 1961 | | |
| Bob Rasmussen and Guy Mitchell | 1 | May 5, 1961 | Atlanta, Georgia | |
Title history is unrecorded from May to November 1961.
| Ray Gunkel and Don McIntyre (3) | 1 | November 1961 | | |
| The Assassins (Assassin I and Assassin II) | 1 | December 1, 1961 | Atlanta, Georgia | |
Title history is unrecorded from December 1961 to November 1962.
| The Kentuckians (Luke Brown and Jake Smith) | 1 | November 1962 | | |
| Lenny Montana and Gypsy Joe (2) | 1 | November 23, 1962 | Atlanta, Georgia | |
Title history is unrecorded from November 1962 to November 1964.
| Eddie Graham and Sam Steamboat | 1 | November 1964 | | |
| The Mysterious Medics | 1 | November 20, 1964 | Atlanta, Georgia | |
| Buddy Fuller and Mario Galento | 1 | January 29, 1965 | Atlanta, Georgia | |
Title is vacated on January 30, 1965.
| The Mysterious Medics | 2 | February 5, 1965 | Atlanta, Georgia | Defeated Tony Marino and Joe Scarpa in 6-team tournament final. |
| Buddy Fuller (2) and Jesse James | 1 | March 19, 1965 | Atlanta, Georgia | |
| Corsica Joe and Corsica Jean | 1 | April 16, 1965 | Atlanta, Georgia | |
| Joe Scarpa and Chief Little Eagle | 1 | June 4, 1965 | Atlanta, Georgia | |
| Al and Mario Galento (2) | 1 | June 11, 1965 | Atlanta, Georgia | |
Title is declared vacant after Al Galento is injured during a match in Atlanta, Georgia, on June 18, 1965.
| Corsica Joe and Corsica Jean | 2 | June 25, 1965 | Atlanta, Georgia | Defeat Jesse James and Greg Peterson in tournament final. |
| Billy and Bad Boy Hines | 1 | July 9, 1965 | Atlanta, Georgia | |
| Dick Steinborn and Nick Kozak | 1 | August 27, 1965 | Atlanta, Georgia | |
Title history is unrecorded from September to October 1965.
| Dutch Savage and Mario Galento (3) | 1 | October 29, 1965 | | |
Title is vacated.
| The Infernos | 1 | April 1, 1966 | Atlanta, Georgia | Defeated Mario Galento and Bobby Shane to win the titles. |
Title is vacated in April 1966 but The Infernos may have continued defending the titles in the Columbus area.
| Enrique and Alberto Torres | 1 | May 6, 1966 | Atlanta, Georgia | Defeated The Mysterious Medics in the finals of a one-night 8-team tournament; later defeated The Infernos on June 22, 1966, to become officially recognized as NWA Southern Tag Team Champions in Columbus. |
| Louie Tillet and Butcher Vachon | 1 | September 23, 1966 | Atlanta, Georgia | |
| Enrique (2) and Ramon Torres | 1 | October 21, 1966 | Atlanta, Georgia | |
| Louie Tillet and Butcher Vachon | 2 | November 7, 1966 | Augusta, Georgia | |
| Enrique (3) and Ramon Torres | 2 | November 16, 1966 | Columbus, Georgia | |
Title is held up after a match against Gene Anderson and Lars Anderson in Atlanta, Georgia, on December 31, 1966.
| Minnesota Wrecking Crew (Gene and Lars Anderson) | 1 | January 1967 | | May have won title in a rematch against the Torres Brothers. |
| Enrique (4) and Ramon Torres | 2 | April 11, 1967 | Savannah, Georgia | |
| Minnesota Wrecking Crew (Gene and Lars Anderson) | 2 | April 28, 1967 | Atlanta, Georgia | |
| Enrique (5) and Ramon Torres | 3 | May 12, 1967 | Atlanta, Georgia | |
| Butcher (3) and Stan Vachon | 1 | June 23, 1967 | Atlanta, Georgia | |
| Ramon (5) and Alberto Torres (2) | 1 | August 21, 1967 | Augusta, Georgia | |
| Butcher (4) and Stan Vachon | 2 | August 28, 1967 | Augusta, Georgia | |
| Enrique (6) and Alberto Torres (3) | 2 | September 5, 1967 | Macon, Georgia | |
| Butcher (5) and Stan Vachon | 3 | December 18, 1967 | Augusta, Georgia | |
| Enrique (7) and Alberto Torres (4) | 3 | January 5, 1968 | Atlanta, Georgia | |
Title is held up after a match against Tarzan Tyler and El Mongol in Atlanta, Georgia, on February 23, 1968.
| Enrique (8) and Alberto Torres (5) | 4 | March 8, 1968 | Atlanta, Georgia | Won titles in rematch. |
| El Mongol and Hans Schmidt | 1 | April 26, 1968 | Atlanta, Georgia | |
| Enrique (9) and Alberto Torres (6) | 5 | May 31, 1968 | Atlanta, Georgia | |
Title is replaced by the NWA Georgia Tag Team Championship at the end of 1968. Title reigns after November 1968 may be for the new titles.
| Butcher (6) and Stan Vachon | 4? | November 1968 | | |
| Ramon (6) and Alberto Torres (7) | 6? | November 11, 1968 | Augusta, Georgia | |
