= Bobby Becker =

American professional wrestler (1918–1954)

Personal information
- Born: John James Emerling; 5 April 1918 Farmingdale, New York, U.S.
- Died: 25 November 1954 (aged 36)

Professional wrestling career
- Ring name(s): Bobby Becker; Hans Schwartz; Ray Schwartz; Ray Kelly
- Billed height: 5 ft 11 in (180 cm)
- Billed weight: 220 lb (100 kg)
- Debut: 1937

John James Emerling (April 5, 1918 – November 25, 1954), professionally known as Bobby Becker, was an American professional wrestler. Becker was active from the 1930s to the 1950s.

== Professional wrestling career ==
Made his professional wrestling debut in 1937. Becker would team with his brother (kayfabe), George Becker in 1947 as the Becker Brothers. Bobby would pass away on November 25, 1954, from leukemia at 36. The Becker Brothers were tag team champions when Becker died. He was replaced by Jack Witzig.

== Championships and accomplishments ==
- Central States Wrestling
  - NWA World Tag Team Championship (Central States version) (1 time) — with George Becker
- Jim Crockett Promotions
  - NWA Mid-Atlantic Southern Tag Team Championship (1 time) — with George Becker (1 time)
- NWA Hollywood
  - NWA World Tag Team Championship (Los Angeles version) (1 time) — with George Becker
- NWA Mid-America
  - NWA Southern Tag Team Championship (Mid-America version) (2 times) — with George Becker
