= Brad Anderson (wrestler) =

American professional wrestler (born 1969)

Personal information
- Born: Bradley Anderson; December 24, 1969 (age 56) Charlotte, NC, United States
- Family: Gene Anderson (father)

Professional wrestling career
- Ring name(s): Agent Steele; Brad Anderson; The Viper; XXX-Xtasy; The Young Gun; Zan Panzer
- Billed height: 6 ft 1 in (185 cm)
- Billed weight: 235 lb (107 kg)
- Billed from: Minneapolis, Minnesota
- Trained by: Gene Anderson; Nelson Royal
- Debut: 1988
- Retired: 2009

Bradley Anderson (born December 24, 1969) is an American professional wrestler. He is the son of fellow professional wrestler Gene Anderson.

== Professional wrestling career ==
Brad Anderson started wrestling in 1988 after being trained by his father, Gene Anderson, and Nelson Royal. He wrestled in the National Wrestling Alliance's (NWA) Jim Crockett Promotions under his real name as well as the masked 'Zan Panzer' and 'Agent Steele'. In 1990 he wrestled in the Pacific Northwest Territory and formed a tag team with Ricky Santana that won the PNW tag team titles. In 1991 he went to Puerto Rico's World Wrestling Council and feuded with Santana over the WWC Light Heavyweight Title. Brad Anderson worked in the NAWA/SAPW as The Viper. He was unmasked by "War Eagle" Chris Chavis. In 1998, he was part of a tag team called "Triple X" in NWA Mid-Atlantic with Drake Dawson and manager Strawberry Fields Winning the NWA North Continental Tag Team Titles in 1999 from The Border Patrol.

In May 2019, Anderson was involved in an incident in North Carolina promotion Revolution Wrestling Authority in which he legitimately attacked another wrestler named Jacob Ryan during a match. The assault was broken up by promoter Julian Strauss and many of the other wrestlers who were booked for the event, and Anderson was escorted from the building. Anderson later defended himself by claiming that Ryan had injured his son Carter with a sloppy clothesline in a segment on the previous event, and that he handled it "old school" by stretching him in retaliation. Ryan pressed assault charges against Anderson. RWA ceased operation shortly afterwards, although it was active again as of May 2022.

== Championships and accomplishments ==
- NWA Mid-Atlantic
  - NWA North Continental Tag Team Championship (1 time) - with Drake Dawson
- Championship Wrestling from Florida
  - NWA Florida Heavyweight Championship (1 time)
- North American Wrestling Alliance
  - NAWA Heavyweight Championship (1 time)
- Pacific Northwest Wrestling
  - NWA Pacific Northwest Tag Team Championship (2 times) - with The Hood/Ricky Santana
- Pro Wrestling Illustrated
  - Ranked No. 200 of the top 500 singles wrestlers in the PWI 500 in 1991
- World Wrestling Council
  - WWC Junior Heavyweight Championship (1 time)
