= Chick Garibaldi =

American professional wrestler (1914–1961)

Personal information
- Born: Charles Curcuru; August 18, 1914 St.Louis, Missouri, U.S.
- Died: February 18, 1961 (aged 46) Sunnyside, Queens, New York, U.S.

Professional wrestling career
- Ring name: Chick Garibaldi
- Debut: 1938

Charles Curcuru (August 18, 1914 – February 18, 1961), best known by his ring name, Chick Garibaldi, was an American professional wrestler. He often teamed with his brothers Gino and Ralph Garibaldi.

== Professional wrestling career ==
Garibaldi made his professional wrestling debut in 1938 in New York City.

From 1946 to 1952, Garibaldi teamed with his brothers Ralph and Gino in St. Louis and California.

In 1956, Garibaldi teamed up with his nephew, Leo to win the NWA Southern Tag Team Championship after defeating Mr. Moto and Kinji Shibuya.

On February 18, 1961, Garibaldi fought against Bruno Sammartino in a match at Sunnyside Gardens in Queens, New York. During the match Sammartino bodyslammed Garibaldi. Garibladi did not get up and the referee stopped the match. He died; he was 46. A medical examiner said that Garibaldi suffered a heart attack. Sammartino was stricken with remorse for months.

== Championships and accomplishments ==
- Gulas-Welch Enterprises
  - World Junior / Light Heavyweight Championship (Tennessee and Alabama version) (1 time)
- Mid-Atlantic Championship Wrestling
  - NWA Southern Tag Team Championship (Mid-Atlantic version) (1 time) - with Leo Garibaldi
- NWA Mid-America
  - NWA Southern Tag Team Championship (Mid-America version) (1 time) - with Leo Garibaldi
- National Wrestling Alliance
  - NWA Southeastern Tag Team Championship (West Virginia version) (1 time) - with Bill Curry
