= Man Mountain Mike =

American professional wrestler (1940–1988)

Personal information
- Born: Gary Michael Fletcher; September 15, 1940 Columbia, New Hampshire, U.S.
- Died: April 30, 1988 (aged 47) South Berwick, Maine, U.S.

Professional wrestling career
- Ring name: Man Mountain Mike
- Billed height: 6 ft 4 in (193 cm)
- Billed weight: 600 lb (272 kg)
- Trained by: The Great Bolo
- Debut: 1967
- Retired: 1977

Gary Michael Fletcher (September 15, 1940 – April 30, 1988), best known by his ring name Man Mountain Mike, was an American professional wrestler.

== Professional wrestling career ==
Fletcher was a baseball player and played two years of college baseball at Washington State Teachers College in Maine. He was discovered at a buffet by Al Lovelock, who wrestled as The Great Bolo, and trained Fletcher as a wrestler. Fletcher made his wrestling debut in 1967 for the American Wrestling Association. He wrestled as a tag team with Haystacks Calhoun, who also weighed over 600 pounds; their combined weight was over 1200 pounds in the ring.

Mike was wrestling with Iron Mike DiBiase on July 2, 1969 in Lubbock, Texas, when DiBiase suffered a fatal heart attack in the ring during the match. DiBiase was pronounced dead at the hospital. DiBiase's death was not directly related to professional wrestling; rather, he died as a result of high cholesterol.

Mike later wrestled in British Columbia, where he had a series of matches against Don Leo Jonathan in 1970 and 1971. Mike wrestled for Championship Wrestling from Florida in the early 1970s. He participated in many battles royal, and because of his size, it was difficult for opponents to eliminate him over the top rope. As a result, the promotion billed him as "the acknowledged king of battles royal" and promoted many of these matches as "featuring Man Mountain Mike". On one occasion in 1972, his participation led to a feud with Buddy Colt, as Colt caused Mike to be eliminated from a battle royal. He would also offer $100 to any wrestler who was able to lift him up.

While competing for NWA Hollywood Wrestling, Mike won the NWA Americas Tag Team Championship with tag team partner Butcher Brannigan on August 31, 1974 at the Olympic Auditorium in Los Angeles, California. They dropped the belts on September 14 to Porkchop Cash and Victor Rivera. He also held the NWA "Beat the Champ" Television Championship twice.

Man Mountain Mike toured Japan as a wrestler in 1975. He had a series of matches against Antonio Inoki, but was unable to defeat Inoki in singles matches or in tag team competitions. He later wrestled for the World Wide Wrestling Federation. He competed in both singles and tag team matches, which included teaming with Crusher Blackwell on February 20, 1976 in a loss to WWWF Tag Team Champions Louis Cerdan and Tony Parisi.

== Retirement, death and legacy ==
After retiring from the ring in 1977, Mike opened a dry cleaning business, as well as a taxi service; he also drove a school bus. He was married to Mary Lee Quinn, and together they had a son, Shawn.

While adjusting his bus seat backwards in 1988, he accidentally cut the back of his leg on the seat track. The cut developed a staph infection, causing blood clots, which were exacerbated by his diabetes. He died on April 30, 1988, aged 47.

The ring name Man Mountain Mike was later used in the Canadian Maritimes by Mike Shaw, who also appeared with the World Wrestling Federation and World Championship Wrestling as Bastion Booger and Norman the Lunatic, respectively.

== Championships and accomplishments ==
- NWA Hollywood Wrestling
  - NWA Americas Tag Team Championship (1 time) – with Butcher Brannigan
  - NWA "Beat the Champ" Television Championship (2 times)

== See also ==
- List of premature professional wrestling deaths
