= Billy Varga =

American actor

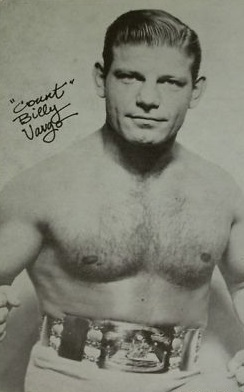
- Varga in the 1960s

Personal information
- Born: William Joe Varga; January 10, 1919 Cleveland, Ohio, U.S.
- Died: January 11, 2013 (aged 94) Burbank, California, U.S.

Professional wrestling career
- Ring name(s): Billy Varga; Count Billy Varga
- Billed height: 5 ft 11 in (1.80 m)
- Billed weight: 200 lb (91 kg)
- Trained by: Joe Varga
- Debut: 1930s
- Retired: 1970s

William Joe Varga (January 10, 1919 – January 11, 2013), billed as Count Billy Varga, was an American professional wrestler and actor. He was born to Rose and Joe Varga; his father was a professional wrestler in Europe known as Count Joseph Varga and taught his son wrestling at the age of five. He attended Hollywood High School and graduated from the University of Southern California. Varga won the world's light-heavyweight title in 1941 and later joined the Navy until he arrived home in 1947. Varga's wrestling career began to wind down in the 1970s as he was busy in television and movie work.

== Personal life ==
Varga married Rosabelle Varga who died in 1992. He resided in Northridge, California. He had three sons, Billy, Courtland and Royce, all of whom preceded him in death, and five grandchildren. He suffered from Alzheimer's disease by the beginning of 2005 and died in 2013.

== Filmography ==
Year	Title	Role	Notes
1949	Alias the Champ	Wrestler	
1949	Bodyhold	Marvelous Milton	
1953	The Abbott and Costello Show	The Big Guy	
1953	Miss Sadie Thompson	Marine	Uncredited
1955	Abbott and Costello Meet the Keystone Kops	Guy outside theater that throws Bud	Uncredited
1960	Shotgun Slade	Snag	Episode: "The Smell of Money"
1961	It Started in Tokyo	Mark	Uncredited
1962	Convicts 4	Guard #7	
1962	The Jack Benny Program	Himself	Episode: "The Story of Jack Referees Wrestling Match"
1964	The Munsters	Strangler Murphy	Episode: "Herman the Great"
1965	Burke's Law	The Count	Uncredited, Episode: "Who Killed the Strangler?"
1973	Oklahoma Crude	Cook	
1976	Ellery Queen	Security Guard	Episode: "The Adventure of the Tyrant of Tin Pan Alley"
1980	Raging Bull	Ring announcer - Third Robinson Fight	
1985	Grunt! The Wrestling Movie	Coach Rocko	
1985	Pro Wrestling Finishing Holds Vol. 1 with Gene LeBell	Self	
1986	Bad Guys	Referee	
1986	Stewardess School	Fight Manager	
1991	Alligator II: The Mutation	Announcer	(final film role)

== Championships and accomplishments ==
- 50th State Big Time Wrestling
  - NWA Hawaii Heavyweight Championship (1 time)
  - NWA Hawaii Tag Team Championship (1 time) - with Sam Steamboat
- NWA Hollywood Wrestling
  - NWA International Television Tag Team Championship (3 times) - with Hardy Kruskamp (2 times) and Mario LaPentero (1 time)
