= Ricky Romero (wrestler) =

American professional wrestler (1931–2006)

Personal information
- Born: Henry Romero; May 24, 1931 San Bernardino, California, U.S.
- Died: January 15, 2006 (aged 74)
- Cause of death: Complications from diabetes
- Children: Chris Youngblood (son); Jay Youngblood (son); Mark Youngblood (son)

Professional wrestling career
- Ring name(s): Enrique Romero; Jay Youngblood Sr. Mexico Grande; Ricky Romero
- Billed height: 5 ft 9 in (175 cm)
- Billed weight: 233 lb (106 kg)
- Billed from: Amarillo, Texas
- Trained by: Diablo Velasco; Professor Romero
- Debut: 1955
- Retired: 1987

Henry Romero (May 24, 1931 – January 15, 2006) was an American professional wrestler, better known by his ring name, "Rapid" Ricky Romero. Romero was best known for his appearances in Texas during the 1970s.

== Professional wrestling career ==
He wrestled in every major market between 1955 into the 1980s. Ricky tagged with the likes of Pedro Morales in the World Wrestling Association (WWA), Terry Funk and Nick Bockwinkel in the National Wrestling Alliance (NWA), and Rito Romero in the WWF. He got his huge break, when Dory Funk Sr. brought him into the Amarillo, Texas area during a time of segregation between races. Ricky Romero was the first Hispanic wrestler in the area and gained a fan given nickname "SuperMex".

In 1972 he beat Terry Funk in a wrestler contest in Amarillo, was a top draw for Gory Guerrero in El Paso, Texas as well as for Fritz Von Erich in Dallas, Texas, and Paul Boesch in Houston, Texas. He was such a top draw in the Rocky Mountain area Colorado, New Mexico and Texas, that Dory Sr. invented the Rocky Mountain Title just for Ricky which he retired in the early 80s.

Ricky Romero as a singles wrestler, went up against the likes of Lou Thesz, Gorgeous George, Wild Red Berry, and Jack Brisco. Romero was also one of the first pioneers to work for Giant Baba and Antonio Inoki in Japan, wearing a mask as Mexico Grand' as a heel. Ricky Romero retired as a professional wrestler in the early 1980s.

In 1981 Romero appeared in Portland wrestling as "Chief Youngblood" and was kayfabe injured by Buddy Rose in an angle involving Romero's son Jay Youngblood.

== Personal life ==
Ricky Romero was married to Stella Marrujo on December 17, 1949. He was the father of wrestlers Steven Romero, Mark Romero and Chris Romero and was also the brother of wrestler Al Romero, who wrestled in NWA Hollywood Wrestling under the ring name the Oregon Lumberjack. All three of Romero's sons wrestled using the gimmick last name "Youngblood". Ricky also served as manager to sons Mark and Chris throughout the late 1980s. Ricky's grandson is also a professional wrestler who used to wrestle under the name "Radical" Ricky Romero III until 2009 when he started using Ricky Youngblood Jr, following the tradition of the rest of his family.

On January 15, 2006 Ricky Romero died at the age of 74 after years of complications due to diabetes. He was buried in Llano Cemetery in Amarillo, Texas, beside his wife Stella Marrujo and son Steven Nicolas Romero, aka Jay Youngblood.

== Championships and accomplishments ==
- Cauliflower Alley Club
  - Family Wrestling Award (2015) – with Chris Youngblood, Jay Youngblood and Mark Youngblood
- Central States Wrestling
  - NWA Central States Tag Team Championship (1 time) – with "Hot Stuff" Eddie Gilbert
- NWA Big Time Wrestling
  - NWA World Tag Team Championship (1 time) – with Nick Bockwinkel
- Western States Sports
  - NWA Brass Knuckles Championship (Amarillo version) (1 time)
  - NWA North American Heavyweight Championship (Amarillo version) (1 time)
  - NWA North American Tag Team Championship (Amarillo version) (7 times) – with Dory Funk Sr. (5), Cyclone Anaya (1), and Eric Rommel (1)
  - NWA Rocky Mountain Heavyweight Championship (5 times)
  - NWA Western States Heavyweight Championship (5 times)
  - NWA Western States Tag Team Championship (11 times) – with Terry Funk (2), Moose Morowski (2), Dory Funk, Jr. (2), Nick Kozak (2), Lord Alfred Hayes (1), Silver Streak (1) and Akihisa Takachiho (1)
  - NWA World Tag Team Championship (Amarillo version) (3 times) - with Cyclone Anaya (1), Gory Guerrero (1) and Nick Bockwinkel (1)
  - NWA World Tag Team Championship (Amarillo version) Tournament (1958) - with Cyclone Anaya
- Worldwide Wrestling Associates
  - WWA World Tag Team Championship (2 times) – with Pedro Morales
