= George Becker (wrestler) =

American professional wrestler (1914–1999)

Personal information
- Born: George Peter Becker; 12 January 1914 New York City, New York, U.S.
- Died: 25 October 1999 (aged 85) Fort Walton Beach, Florida, U.S.
- Spouse: Joyce Grable (m. 1968)

Professional wrestling career
- Ring name(s): George Becker; Sam Becker; Young Szabo
- Billed height: 5 ft 10 in (178 cm)
- Billed weight: 215 lb (98 kg)
- Debut: 1934
- Retired: 1971

George Peter Becker (January 12, 1914 – October 25, 1999) was an American professional wrestler. Becker was active from the 1930s to the 1970s.

== Professional wrestling career ==
George Becker was born on January 12, 1914, in New York City, New York. During the 1930s and 1940s, he wrestled with Jack Pfefer Promotions, as well as other promotions in the Northeastern United States. Becker would team with his brother (kayfabe) Bobby Becker in 1947 as the Becker Brothers. Bobby would pass away on November 25, 1954, from leukemia at 36. The Becker Brothers were tag team champions when Bobby died. Bobby was replaced by Jack Witzig. He would later gain notability wrestling under the local Jim Crockett Promotions.

== Personal life ==
Becker married professional wrestler Joyce Grable.

== Championships and accomplishments ==
- Central States Wrestling
  - NWA World Tag Team Championship (Central States version) (1 time) — with Bobby Becker
- Championship Wrestling from Florida
  - NWA Southern Tag Team Championship (Florida version) — with Johnny Weaver
- Gulas-Welch Enterprises
  - World Light Heavyweight Championship (Tennessee and Alabama version) (1 time)
- Jack Pfefer Promotions
  - World Junior Heavyweight Championship (Jack Pfefer version) (1 time)
  - World Light Heavyweight Championship (Connecticut version) (2 times)
- Jim Crockett Promotions
  - NWA Mid-Atlantic Tag Team Championship (4 times) — with Johnny Weaver
  - NWA Mid-Atlantic Southern Tag Team Championship (21 times) — with Bobby Becker (1 time), Jack Witzig (5 times), Dick Steinborn (2 times), Mike Clancy (3 times), Billy Two Rivers (1 time), Enrique Torres (1 time), Sandy Scott (2 times), Johnny Weaver (7 times)
- Los Angeles Booking Office
  - World Heavyweight Championship (Los Angeles version) (1 time)
  - Pacific Coast Heavyweight Championship (Los Angeles version) (1 time)
  - California State Heavyweight Championship (2 times)
- NWA Hollywood
  - NWA World Tag Team Championship (Los Angeles version) (1 time) — with Bobby Becker
- NWA Mid-America
  - NWA Southern Tag Team Championship (Mid-America version) (2 times) — with Bobby Becker and Jack Witzig
