= NWA Southern Heavyweight Championship =

The NWA Southern Heavyweight Championship was a regional professional wrestling title which may have had several versions, including:

- NWA Florida Southern Heavyweight Championship, used in Championship Wrestling from Florida and NWA Florida
- NWA Southern Heavyweight Championship (Georgia version), used in Georgia Championship Wrestling
- AWA Southern Heavyweight Championship, used in the Continental Wrestling Association and other associations
- NWA Southern Heavyweight Championship (Tennessee version), used in Southern Championship Wrestling
- NWA Southern Heavyweight Championship (SAW) used in NWA Southern All-Star Wrestling
