= Fritz Von Erich =

American professional wrestler (1929–1997)

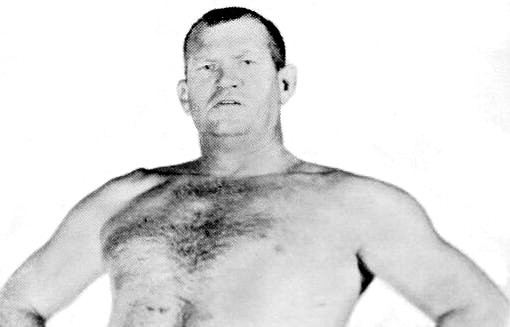
- Von Erich in 1977

Personal information
- Born: Jack Barton Adkisson; August 16, 1929 Jewett, Texas, U.S.
- Died: September 10, 1997 (aged 68) Lake Dallas, Texas, U.S.
- Cause of death: Brain and lung cancer
- Spouse: Doris J. Smith (m. 1950; div. 1992)
- Children: 6, including Kevin, David, Kerry, Mike, and Chris
- Family: Von Erich

Professional wrestling career
- Ring name(s): Fritz Von Erich; Tetsu no Tsume (Iron Claw); Jack Adkisson
- Billed height: 6 ft 4 in (193 cm)
- Billed weight: 264 lb (120 kg)
- Billed from: Denton, Texas; Munich, Germany; Berlin, Germany; Milwaukee, Wisconsin
- Trained by: Stu Hart
- Debut: 1953
- Retired: 1986

Jack Barton Adkisson Sr. (August 16, 1929 – September 10, 1997), better known by his ring name Fritz Von Erich, was an American professional wrestler, wrestling promoter, and the patriarch of the Von Erich family. He was a 3-time world champion and a 20-time NWA United States Champion. He was the owner of World Class Championship Wrestling.

== Early life ==
Adkisson was born in Jewett, Texas on August 16, 1929. He was the only child of Benjamin Rush Adkisson Jr. and his wife Coren. He attended Crozier Tech High School in Dallas, where he was active in football and track and field, particularly in shot put and discus throwing.

He attended Southern Methodist University initially on a music scholarship, where he continued to perform in athletics. He later transferred to the University of Corpus Christi. However, he dropped out following an ankle injury and to take care of his ill grandmother. Between 1951 and 1952, he worked as a firefighter.

On June 18, 1952, Adkisson signed with the Dallas Texans of the National Football League as a lineman. He quit the Texans on August 7, 1952, after stating he had no chance of making the team.

== Professional wrestling career ==
=== Early career and training ===
Adkisson debuted as a professional wrestler under his real name in August 1952, under the auspices of local promoter Ed McLemore. After relocating to New England in 1953, he adopted a new heel persona and ring name Fritz Von Erich, billed from Munich, Germany (or sometimes Berlin). Wrestling historian Steve Johnson credits the gimmick to promoters Tony Santos and Jack Pfefer, who felt Adkisson's Texas babyface gimmick would not work in New England. Years later, Von Erich would claim "Erich" was his mother's maiden name, though this has not been substantiated.

While in Edmonton, he met wrestler and trainer Stu Hart, and Hart decided to train and book him in his Klondike Wrestling promotion. Hart teamed him with kayfabe "brother" Waldo Von Erich.

Von Erich's oldest son Jack Barton Adkisson Jr. was born September 21, 1952. He died in 1959 after an accidental electrocution and drowning, and Jack Sr. stopped traveling to the east coast, allowing former partner Waldo to use the Von Erich name in the World Wide Wrestling Federation.

=== 1960s ===
Despite Jack Jr.'s death, Von Erich continued to travel and wrestle. Von Erich won both versions of the AWA World title in 1963. His major circuit was Sam Muchnick's NWA territorial stronghold in St. Louis, Missouri. He wrestled there until 1967, when he voluntarily left the territory after losing a match for the NWA World Heavyweight Championship against then-champion Gene Kiniski. In the late 1960s, with Muchnick's backing, Von Erich became the promoter for the Dallas area, effectively overseeing the Houston and San Antonio territories, as well.

=== Japan ===
Von Erich was a part of rebuilding Japanese wrestling after the stabbing death of Rikidōzan in 1963. He became a star due to his feuds with Antonio Inoki and Giant Baba, and his "Iron Claw" hold, which became one of the most popular wrestling moves in Japan.

=== Retirement ===
In 1982, he held his first retirement match against King Kong Bundy in the newly renamed World Class Championship Wrestling (WCCW) promotion, based in Dallas. The promotion was known for its high production values, use of entrance music and the use of television syndication. He wrestled his last match on November 27, 1986, defeating Abdullah the Butcher by disqualification in Dallas. By the end of the 1980s, the promotion's talent pool was thin and it was eventually merged with Jerry Jarrett's Continental Wrestling Association to create the United States Wrestling Association in 1989.

The Von Erich family (from left to right): Kerry, Fritz, Kevin, Chris (front), Mike and David

== In popular culture ==
Von Erich was part of the video game Legends of Wrestling series, first appearing in Legends of Wrestling (2001) as an unlockable character, in Legends of Wrestling II (2002) and Showdown: Legends of Wrestling (2004). Also appeared in the video game; Giant Gram 2000: All Japan Pro Wrestling 3 (2000) on SEGA. In 2019, Von Erich was covered as part of the Dark Side of the Ring episode on the Von Erichs.

Von Erich is portrayed in an antagonistic capacity by Holt McCallany in the critically acclaimed 2023 film The Iron Claw.

== Personal life and death ==
Von Erich married Doris J. Smith on June 23, 1950. Together, they had six sons, including Kevin, David, Kerry, Mike, and Chris. Only Kevin would outlive him. The couple divorced on July 21, 1992.

Von Erich died of brain and lung cancer at his home in Lake Dallas, Texas on September 10, 1997, at the age of 68.

== Legacy ==
In 2009, he was inducted into the WWE Hall of Fame along with his family. He was inducted by Freebird Michael Hayes. It was accepted by his surviving son Kevin.

The 2023 film The Iron Claw depicts the Von Erich family story, with Fritz played by Holt McCallany.

== Championships and accomplishments ==
- All Japan Pro Wrestling
  - NWA International Tag Team Championship (1 time) - with Karl Krupp
- Big Time Wrestling
  - NWA United States Heavyweight Championship (Detroit Version) (3 times)
- Maple Leaf Wrestling
  - NWA Canadian Open Tag Team Championship (3 times) - with Karl Von Schober (2) and Gene Kiniski (1)
- Mid-Atlantic Championship Wrestling
  - NWA Southern Tag Team Championship (Mid-Atlantic version) (1 time) - with Waldo Von Erich
- NWA Minneapolis Wrestling and Boxing Club / American Wrestling Association
  - AWA World Heavyweight Championship (1 time)
  - NWA World Tag Team Championship (Minneapolis version) (1 time) - with Hans Hermann
  - World Heavyweight Championship (Omaha) (2 times)
- NWA Western States Sports
  - NWA International Tag Team Championship (Amarillo version) (1 time) - with Killer Karl Krupp
  - NWA North American Heavyweight Championship (Amarillo version) (4 times)
  - NWA World Tag Team Championship (Amarillo version) (1 time) - with Gene Kiniski
- Pro Wrestling Illustrated
  - Ranked No. 207 of the top 500 singles wrestlers of the "PWI Years" in 2003
- Professional Wrestling Hall of Fame
  - Class of 2012
- Southwest Sports, Inc / NWA Big Time Wrestling / World Class Championship Wrestling
  - NWA American Heavyweight Championship (13 times)
  - NWA American Tag Team Championship (7 times) - with Waldo Von Erich (2), Billy Red Lyons (1), Grizzly Smith (1), Fred Curry (1), Dan Miller (1), and Dean Ho (1)
  - NWA Brass Knuckles Championship (Texas version) (5 times)
  - NWA Texas Heavyweight Championship (4 times)
  - NWA United States Heavyweight Championship (Texas version) (3 times) (Note: This championship was later renamed the NWA American Heavyweight Championship in May 1968. It would later be renamed the WCWA World Heavyweight Championship after World Class' withdrawal from the NWA in February 1986.)
  - NWA World Six-Man Tag Team Championship (Texas version) (1 time) - with Kevin & Mike Von Erich
  - NWA World Tag Team Championship (Texas Version) (2 times) - with Killer Karl Kox (1) and Duke Keomuka (1)
- Stampede Wrestling
  - Alberta Tag Team Championship (2 times) - with Lou Sjoberg
- St. Louis Wrestling Hall of Fame
  - Class of 2007
- WWE
  - WWE Hall of Fame

== See also ==
- List of notable brain tumor patients
- Von Erich family

== Notes ==
Preceded by Sam Muchnick	President of the National Wrestling Alliance; 1975–1976	Succeeded by Edward Gossett
