= NWA North American Heavyweight Championship (Amarillo version) =

NWA North American Heavyweight Championship (Amarillo)

Details
- Promotion: Western States Sports
- Date established: January 3, 1957
- Date retired: June 12, 1969
Statistics
- First champion: Dizzy Davis
- Most reigns: Dory Funk (17 reigns)
- Longest reign: Buddy Colt (154 days)
- Shortest reign: Johnny Valentine (1 day)

The Amarillo version of the NWA North American Heavyweight Championship was a top singles title in the National Wrestling Alliance's Amarillo, Texas territory, Western States Sports. It lasted from 1957 until 1969, when it was replaced with the NWA Western States Heavyweight Championship.

== Title history ==
- (n) written after a date indicates the title change occurred no later than that date.

Wrestler:	Times:	Date:	Location:	Notes:
Dizzy Davis	1	January 3, 1957	Amarillo, Texas	Defeated Jim Wright to become the first champion.
Dory Funk	1	January 31, 1957	Amarillo, Texas	
The Great Bolo	1	February 7, 1957	Amarillo, Texas	Also defeated Funk to win the NWA Southwest Heavyweight Championship on February 14, 1957 in Amarillo, Texas.
Dory Funk	2	February 28, 1957	Amarillo, Texas	Won the Southwest and North American Heavyweight titles.
Roy Shire	1	April 11, 1957	Amarillo, Texas	
Don Curtis	1	May 1957 (n)	Amarillo, Texas	
Bob Geigel	1	May 9, 1957	Amarillo, Texas	
Mike DiBiase	1	August 15, 1957	Amarillo, Texas	
Danny Plechas	1	1957		
Dory Funk	3	December 19, 1957	Amarillo, Texas	
Buddy Rogers	1	January 23, 1958	Amarillo, Texas	
Dory Funk	4	April 3, 1958	Amarillo, Texas	
Mike DiBiase	2	1958		
Dory Funk	5	January 29, 1959	Amarillo, Texas	
Nick Roberts	1	May 21, 1959	Amarillo, Texas	
Dory Funk	6	1959		
Antone Leone	1	August 13, 1959	Amarillo, Texas	
Dory Funk	7	December 3, 1959	Amarillo, Texas	
Rock Hunter	1	January 1960 (n)		
Sonny Myers	1	January 21, 1960	Amarillo, Texas	
Gene LeBell	1	March 17, 1960	Amarillo, Texas	
Pancho Lopez	1	1960		
Mike DiBiase	3	October 27, 1960	Amarillo, Texas	
Sonny Myers	2	November 3, 1960	Amarillo, Texas	
Nikita Mulkovich	1	November 10, 1960	Amarillo, Texas	
Pancho Lopez	2	November 17, 1960	Amarillo, Texas	Defeated Mike DiBiase.
Nikita Mulkovich	2	November 24, 1960	Amarillo, Texas	
Dory Funk	8	March 16, 1961	Amarillo, Texas	
Danny McShain	1	June 22, 1961	Amarillo, Texas	
Dory Funk	9	July 13, 1961	Amarillo, Texas	
Fritz Von Erich	1	April 26, 1962	Amarillo, Texas	
Dory Funk	10	June 7, 1962	Amarillo, Texas	
Fritz Von Erich	2	October 1962 (n)		
Dory Funk	11	November 1, 1962	Amarillo, Texas	
Title vacated between November 1962 and January 1963.
Dory Funk	12	January 16, 1963	Lubbock, Texas	Defeated Gene Kiniski in a tournament final.
Fritz Von Erich	3	February 20, 1963	Amarillo, Texas	
Dory Funk	13	1963		
Fritz Von Erich	4	July 23, 1964	Amarillo, Texas	
Dory Funk	14	July 30, 1964	Amarillo, Texas	
Johnny Valentine	1	February 10, 1965	Lubbock, Texas	
Dory Funk, Jr.	1	February 11, 1965	Amarillo, Texas	
Johnny Valentine	2	1965-1966		
Fritz Von Erich	5	August 4, 1966		
Kinji Shibuya	1	June 29, 1967	Amarillo, Texas	
Dory Funk	15	December 1967 (n)		
Clubfoot Inferno	1	August 8, 1968	Amarillo, Texas	
Dory Funk	16	September 5, 1968	Amarillo, Texas	
Title vacated in October 1968 after Funk is injured by Pat Patterson and The Infernos.
Pat Patterson	1	October 24, 1968	Amarillo, Texas	Defeated Pat O'Connor in a tournament final.
Ricky Romero	1	1968		
Buddy Colt	1	January 9, 1969		
Dory Funk	17	June 12, 1969		
Title replaced with the NWA Western States Heavyweight Championship in 1969.

== See also ==
- National Wrestling Alliance
