= NWA Southern Tag Team Championship (Mid-Atlantic version) =

Professional wrestling tag team championship

Details
- Promotion: Mid-Atlantic Championship Wrestling
- Date established: 1951
- Date retired: 1969
Statistics
- First champions: Earl Wampler and Jack O'Brien
- Most reigns: George Becker and Johnny Weaver (7 reigns) (as individual) George Becker (23 reigns)
- Longest reign: George Becker and Johnny Weaver (284 days)
- Shortest reign: Leo Garibaldi and Chick Garibaldi (6 days)

The NWA Southern Tag Team Championship (Mid-Atlantic version) was the Mid-Atlantic territory version of the NWA Southern Tag Team Championship and was defended between 1953 until 1968 when it became the NWA Atlantic Coast Tag Team Championship. It is one of the earliest titles to be defended in the Carolinas, most often in Lenoir, Greensboro and Charlotte, North Carolina.

== Title history ==
Wrestlers:	Reigns together:	Date:	Place:	Notes:
Earl Wampler and Jack O'Brien	1	September 25, 1951		George Becker and Mike Clancy vs Jim Austeri and Johnny Heidman on September 27, 1953, in Lexington, North Carolina.
Title history is unrecorded.
The Smith Brothers (Al and John Smith)	1	November 11, 1951		Recognized in Tennessee as early as September 1953.
Title history is unrecorded.
The Smith Brothers (Al and John)	2	December 5, 1953		
The Becker Brothers (George and Bobby)	1	March 1954		
The Smith Brothers (Al and John)	3	March 8, 1954	Charlotte, North Carolina	
The Curtis Brothers (George and Jack)	1	May 29, 1954?	Lenoir, North Carolina?	
The Smith Brothers (Al and John)	4	June 5, 1954?	Lenoir, North Carolina?	
Mr. Moto and Kinji Shibuya	1	July 19, 1954	Charlotte, North Carolina	
The Becker Brothers (George and Bobby)	2	October 18, 1954	Charlotte, North Carolina	
George Becker (3) and Jack Witzig	1	November 25, 1954		Bobby Becker died on November 26, 1954; Witzig was chosen as George Becker's new partner.
Vacated		January 13, 1955		With a tournament being held.
Title history is unrecorded. A championship match was held in Lenoir, North Carolina, between George Becker and Tex Riley vs. Al Kashey and Dave Jones on February 26 and March 5, 1955. It is unknown which team held the title.
The Dusek Family (Emil and Ernie)	1	July 2, 1955	Lexington, North Carolina	
George Becker (4) and Jack Witzig (2)	2	July 27, 1955	Asheville, North Carolina	
Title held up in Lexington, North Carolina after a match against Babe Zaharias and Hombre Montana on October 22, 1955.
George Becker (5) and Jack Witzig (3)	3	October 29, 1955	Lexington, North Carolina	Win rematch.
Title held up in Lexington, NC after a match against Mike Gallagher and Doc Gallagher ends as no contest on March 3, 1956, and the rematch on March 10, 1956, also ends as a no contest.
George Becker (6) and Jack Witzig (4)	4	March 17, 1956	Lexington, North Carolina	Defeats Mike Gallagher and Doc Gallagher in rematch.
Mr. Moto and Kinji Shibuya	2	May 7, 1956	Winston-Salem, North Carolina	
Leo and Chick Garibaldi	1	June 20, 1956	Asheville, North Carolina	
Tiny Mills and Jim Austeri	1	June 26, 1956	Nashville, Tennessee	
George Becker (7) and Jack Witzig (5)	5	September 17, 1956	Charlotte, North Carolina	
Jim Austeri (2) and Ali Bey	1	December 8, 1956	Lexington, North Carolina	
The Flying Scotts (George and Sandy)	1	March 18, 1957	Charlotte, North Carolina	
The Dusek Family (Ernie and Emil)	2	May 20, 1957	Charlotte, North Carolina	
Ivan Bornov and Karol Fozoff	1	June 1957		Sometime between June 4, 1957, and June 14, 1957.
The Flying Scotts (George Scott and Sandy Scott)	2	July 6, 1957		Sometime after June 29, 1957.
Title history is unrecorded.
George Becker (8) and Dick Steinborn	1	July 27, 1957		Still champions as of August 10, 1957.
Title history is unrecorded.
The Gallagher Brothers (Doc Gallagher and Mike Gallagher)	1	September 21, 1957		
George Becker (9) and Dick Steinborn (2)	2	September 30, 1957	Charlotte, North Carolina	
Mr. Moto (3) and Duke Keomuka	1	March 31, 1958	Charlotte, North Carolina	
George Becker (10) and Mike Clancy	1	May 26, 1958	Charlotte, North Carolina	
Frank Jares and Hans Schnabel	1	June 21, 1958	Hickory, North Carolina	
George Becker (11) and Mike Clancy (2)	2	July 5, 1958	Hickory, North Carolina	
The Von Erichs (Fritz and Waldo)	1	October 13, 1958	Charlotte, North Carolina	
George Becker (12) and Mike Clancy (3)	3	October 27, 1958	Charlotte, North Carolina	
The Smith Brothers (Al and John)	5	January 26, 1959	Charlotte, North Carolina	
George Becker (13) and Billy Two Rivers	1	March 31, 1959	Raleigh, North Carolina	
The Torres Brothers (Alberto Torres and Enrique Torres)	1	April 6, 1959	Charlotte, North Carolina	
Mr. Moto (4) and Duke Keomuka (2)	2	July 6, 1959	Charlotte, North Carolina	
Larry Hamilton and The Great Bolo	1	August 24, 1959	Charlotte, North Carolina	
George Becker (14) and Enrique Torres (2)	1	November 23, 1959	Charlotte, North Carolina	
Larry Hamilton and Great Bolo	2	December 19, 1959	Spartanburg, South Carolina	
Amazing Zuma and Haystacks Calhoun	1	April 11, 1960	Charlotte, North Carolina	
Larry Hamilton and Great Bolo	3	April 25, 1960	Charlotte, North Carolina	Still champions as of June 23, 1960.
Title history is unrecorded.
Tosh Togo and Ike Eakins	1	September 1960		
Ray Villmer and Jack Curtis (2)	1	October 30, 1960	Charlotte, North Carolina	
Gypsy Joe and Louis Tillet	1	November 21, 1960	Charlotte, North Carolina	
Ray Villmer and Jack Curtis (3)	2	December 1960		
Mad Dog and Butcher Vachon	1	January 23, 1961	Charlotte, North Carolina	
George Becker (15) and Sandy Scott (2)	2	March 27, 1961	Charlotte, North Carolina	
Great Bolo (4) and Mike Paidousis	1	April 1, 1961		
George Becker (16) and Sandy Scott (3)	3	April 9, 1961		
Great Bolo (5) and Mike Paidousis (2)	2	April 28, 1961		
The Von Brauners (Kurt and Karl)	1	June 26, 1961		Still champions as of November 11, 1961.
Title history is unrecorded.
Don Curtis and Joe Scarpa	1	September 6, 1962		
Ike Eakins (2) and Pancho Villa	1	September 17, 1962	Charlotte, North Carolina	
Don Curtis and Joe Scarpa	2	September 24, 1962	Charlotte, North Carolina	
Title Vacated in November 1962 when the team leaves territory.
Title history is unrecorded
Ray Andrews and Eric Pomeroy	1	June 8, 1963		
The Canadian Wrecking Crew (Chris Tolos and John Tolos)	1	July 30, 1963	Raleigh, North Carolina	
Ray Andrews and Eric Pomeroy	2	August 6, 1963	Raleigh, North Carolina	
Swede Hanson and Rip Hawk	1	October 26, 1963		
Johnny Weaver and “Cowboy” Bob Ellis	1	December 2, 1963	Charlotte, North Carolina	
Title Vacant in 1964 when Ellis leaves the area.
Eddie Graham and Sam Steamboat	1	May 1965		Billed as champions upon arrival.
Bronko Lubich and Aldo Bogni	1	May 24, 1965	Charlotte, North Carolina	
George Becker (17) and Johnny Weaver (2)	1	September 9, 1965	Greensboro, North Carolina	
Bronko Lubich and Aldo Bogni	2	February 2, 1966	Raleigh, North Carolina	
George Becker (18) and Johnny Weaver (3)	2	November 3, 1966	Greensboro, North Carolina	
Stan Kowalski and Black Jack Daniels	1	February 14, 1967	Tampa, Florida	Continue to be recognized in the Carolinas.
Infernos (Frankie Cain and Rocky Smith)	1	July 20, 1967	Greensboro, North Carolina	
Title held up as of August 1967.
P.Y. Chung and Haru Sasaki	1	August 15, 1967	Columbia, South Carolina	Chung and Sasaki refuse to give up the title.
George Becker (19) and Johnny Weaver (4)	3	August 22, 1967	Columbia, South Carolina	Win rematch.
Larry Hamilton (4) and Pampero Firpo	1	September 1967		Sometime after September 7, 1967.
Title held up as of September 21, 1967.
Larry Hamilton (5) and Pampero Firpo (2)	2	September 21, 1967	Norfolk, Virginia	Becker and Weaver refuse to give up the title.
George Becker (20) and Johnny Weaver (5)	4	September 28, 1967	Norfolk, Virginia	Win rematch.
Title held up after a match against Larry Hamilton and Pampero Firpo on June 29, 1967, in Lynchburg, Virginia.
George Becker (21) and Johnny Weaver (6)	5	October 6, 1967	Lynchburg, Virginia	Win rematch.
Title held up after a match against Gene Anderson and Lars Anderson on March 5, 1968, in High Point, North Carolina.
George Becker (22) and Johnny Weaver (7)	6	April 4, 1968	Greensboro, North Carolina	Defeated the Minnesota Wrecking Crew in a rematch.
Anderson family (Gene and Ole Anderson)	1	January 13, 1969	Charlotte, North Carolina	
George Becker (23) and Johnny Weaver (8)	7	January 20, 1969	Charlotte, North Carolina	Defeat Rip Hawk and Swede Hanson in Winston-Salem, North Carolina, on May 1, 1969, to win the NWA Atlantic Coast Tag Team Title.
Permanently replaced by the NWA Atlantic Coast Tag Team Championship
