= NWA Southwest Junior Heavyweight Championship =

Pro-wrestling championship defended in Amarillo Territory of NWA

Details
- Promotion: Western States Sports
- Date established: 1948
- Date retired: 1959
Statistics
- First champion(s): Al Getz
- Final champion(s): Dory Funk
- Most reigns: Dory Funk (8 reigns)

The NWA Southwest Junior Heavyweight Championship was a professional wrestling championship defended in the Amarillo, Texas territory of the National Wrestling Alliance, Western States Sports.

== Title history ==
Key
Symbol	Meaning
No.	The overall championship reign
Reign	The reign number for the specific wrestler listed.
Event	The event in which the championship changed hands
N/A	The specific information is not known

No.	Champion	Reign	Date	Days held	Location	Event	Notes	Ref(s).
1	Al Getz	1	1948	(Note: The exact date the championship was won/lost is uncertain, which means the reign lasted between 1 and 49 days.)	N/A	Live event		
2	Wayne Martin	1	February 19, 1948	203	Amarillo, Texas	Live event		
3	Billy Weidner	1	September 9, 1948	(Note: The exact date the championship was won/lost is uncertain, which means the reign lasted between 1 and 91 days.)	Amarillo, Texas	Live event		
4	Wayne Martin	2	1948	(Note: The exact date the championship was won/lost is uncertain, which means the reign lasted between 1 and 91 days.)	N/A	Live event		
5	Dick Trout	1	December 9, 1948	(Note: The exact date the championship was won/lost is uncertain, which means the reign lasted between 23 and 429 days.)	Amarillo, Texas	Live event		
6	Dory Funk	1	1949	(Note: The exact date the championship was won/lost is uncertain, which means the reign lasted between 42 and 406 days.)	N/A	Live event		
7	Wayne Martin	3	February 11, 1950	96	Amarillo, Texas	Live event		
8	Frank Murdoch	1	May 18, 1950	69	Amarillo, Texas	Live event		
9	Ray Clements	1	July 26, 1950	8	Lubbock, Texas	Live event		
10	Frank Murdoch	2	August 3, 1950	(Note: The exact date the championship was won/lost is uncertain, which means the reign lasted between 1 and 77 days.)	Amarillo, Texas	Live event		
11	Bob Cummings	1	1950	(Note: The exact date the championship was won/lost is uncertain, which means the reign lasted between 1 and 77 days.)	N/A	Live event		
12	Dory Funk	2	October 19, 1950	166	Amarillo, Texas	Live event		
13	Tony Morelli	1	April 3, 1951	71	Lubbock, Texas	Live event		
14	Frank Murdoch	3	June 13, 1951	(Note: The exact date the championship was won/lost is uncertain, which means the reign lasted between 1 and 201 days.)	Lubbock, Texas	Live event		
15	Dory Funk	3	1951	(Note: The exact date the championship was won/lost is uncertain, which means the reign lasted between 192 and 393 days.)	N/A	Live event		
16	Cowboy Carlson	1	July 10, 1952	54	Amarillo, Texas	Live event		
17	Gory Guerrero	1	September 2, 1952	44	El Paso, Texas	Live event		
18	Ivan Kalmikoff	1	October 16, 1952	124	Amarillo, Texas	Live event		
19	Dory Funk	4	February 17, 1953	142	San Angelo, Texas	Live event		
20	Roger Mackay	1	July 9, 1953	(Note: The exact date the championship was won/lost is uncertain, which means the reign lasted between 1 and 175 days.)	Amarillo, Texas	Live event		
21	Roy Shire	1	1953	(Note: The exact date the championship was won/lost is uncertain, which means the reign lasted between −232 and 308 days.)	N/A	Live event		
22	Dory Funk	5	May 13, 1954	1,001	Amarillo, Texas	Live event		
23	The Great Bolo	1	February 7, 1957	21	Amarillo, Texas	Live event		
24	Dory Funk	6	February 28, 1957	819	Amarillo, Texas	Live event		
25	Nick Roberts	1	May 28, 1959	7	Amarillo, Texas	Live event		
26	Dory Funk	7	June 4, 1959	(Note: The exact date the championship was won/lost is uncertain, which means the reign lasted between 1 and 21 days.)	Amarillo, Texas	Live event		
27	Iron Mike DiBiase	1	1959	(Note: The exact date the championship was won/lost is uncertain, which means the reign lasted between 1 and 21 days.)	N/A	Live event		
28	Dory Funk	8	June 25, 1959	(Note: The length of the championship reign is too uncertain to calculate.)	Amarillo, Texas	Live event		
