= Doc Sarpolis =

American professional wrestler (1897–1967)

Doc Sarpolis

Karl Sarpolis (August 31, 1897 – May 28, 1967) was a professional wrestler and wrestling promoter in Texas. He was the promoter of the Amarillo, Texas-based Western States Sports promotion.

== Early life ==
Sarpolis was born in Newport, Pennsylvania, to Lithuanian immigrants. He had a love for music and could play several instruments. During his enrollment at the University of Chicago, he made money performing in a band. He also played football for coach Amos Alonzo Stagg.

After serving in World War I, he attended medical school at Rush College and in 1926 earned a medical degree from Loyola, following in his brother's footsteps.

== Wrestling ==
He was recruited into wrestling by Jack Pfefer in 1926, who recommended that he emphasize his Lithuanian heritage. He wrestled Jim Londos in San Francisco on July 12, 1932. The match had an attendance of over 10,000. In 1933, he claimed the undisputed championship of Lithuania by winning a tournament in Cleveland.

During the Great Depression, Sarpolis would book in Dallas for Ed McLemore. He occasionally refereed and filled in for injured wrestlers and filled in for wrestlers who missed bookings. His nickname was "Doc", and he purchased one-third of the Texas Wrestling Agency with Sigel and Burke. The group would book grapplers into Dallas, San Antonio, and other cities in Texas. In April 1953, he sold his stake and jumped to McLemore’s anti-NWA outfit.

== Amarillo ==
In 1955, Sarpolis and Dory Funk bought out Dory Detton's Western States Sports promotion in Amarillo for approximately $75,000. The West Texas territory had the Funk family as its headliners. Once known for junior heavyweights, the new ownership transformed Amarillo into an area featuring grapplers of all shapes and sizes.

Although Funk was considered a potential replacement for Pat O’Connor as NWA world heavyweight champion, the NWA decided to go with Buddy Rogers as champion. The Amarillo office then chose to recognize Gene Kiniski as champion instead. Sarpolis continued to pay membership dues and In August 1962 was elected president of the NWA. He became the first president to recognize a champion other than the NWA titleholder. Even after Lou Thesz defeated Rogers for the NWA title in Toronto, Sarpolis continued to recognize Kiniski and then Dory Funk, Jr. as champion.

At the August 1963 NWA convention in St. Louis, members worked to reach a solution and the Amarillo office agreed to recognize Thesz. Losses to The Shiek and Thesz led to the eventual phasing out of Dory Jr.’s championship.

Throughout the 1960s, Sarpolis and Funk, Sr. had working agreements with Sam Muchnick, Verne Gagne, Bob Geigel and Jim Barnett. The Amarillo production had Stanley Blackburn as its kayfabe commissioner, Shelton Key as the ring announcer, and the weekly TV shows were taped on Saturday afternoons from the studio of KVII-TV (Channel 7 in Amarillo).

Sarpolis died of a heart attack on May 28, 1967, after a boating accident. The Sarpolis family would sell his shares in the Amarillo promotion to Dory Funk, Jr. and Terry Funk.

== Personal ==
Sarpolis married his first wife, Josephine (née Dzugas) on August 13, 1920. They had two sons: Karl Jr. died as an infant less than a year old. A second son also named Karl was born on November 20, 1924, lived in Chicago until his death on June 19, 1996. He was married on February 3, 1936, to Vivian Proctor with wrestler Ellis Bashara as his best man. He would marry a second time and had a daughter named Betty Jane on July 23, 1944.
