= Dory Funk =

American professional wrestler (1919–1973)

Dory Funk Sr.
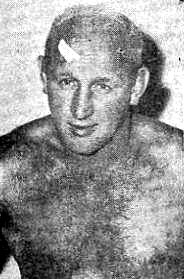
- Funk in 1962

Personal information
- Born: Dorrance Wilhelm Funk; May 4, 1919 Hammond, Indiana, U.S.
- Died: June 3, 1973 (aged 54) Amarillo, Texas, U.S.
- Education: Indiana State University
- Spouses: Dorothy Culver Funk; Betty Funk
- Children: 3, including Dory Funk Jr. and Terry Funk

Professional wrestling career
- Ring name(s): Dory Dean; Dory Deane; Dory Dillard; Dory Funk; Dory Funk Sr. The Outlaw
- Billed height: 6 ft 0 in (183 cm)
- Billed weight: 249 lb (113 kg)
- Billed from: Amarillo, Texas
- Debut: 1940

Dorrance Wilhelm Funk (May 4, 1919 – June 3, 1973) was an American professional wrestler. He is the father of wrestlers Dory Funk Jr. and Terry Funk, and was a promoter of the Amarillo, Texas-based Western States Sports promotion.

== Early life ==
Funk was born in Hammond, Indiana, on May 4, 1919, as the son of Emma E. (Gust) and German immigrant Adam Funk. He was an Indiana high school state champion amateur wrestler for three years at Hammond High School in Hammond, Indiana, as well as an Indiana State University Amateur Athletic Union champion for one year.

== Professional wrestling career ==
Funk began his career as a professional wrestler after serving in the United States Navy during World War II, starting in the southwest United States. He wrestled primarily in the Texas territories and the Central States territories during his career. Mainly a junior heavyweight, he fought Iron Mike DiBiase, Mike Clancy, Danny Hodge and Verne Gagne. After Dory Jr. won the NWA Heavyweight championship in 1969, he was at ringside for many of his son's title defences.

=== Promoter ===
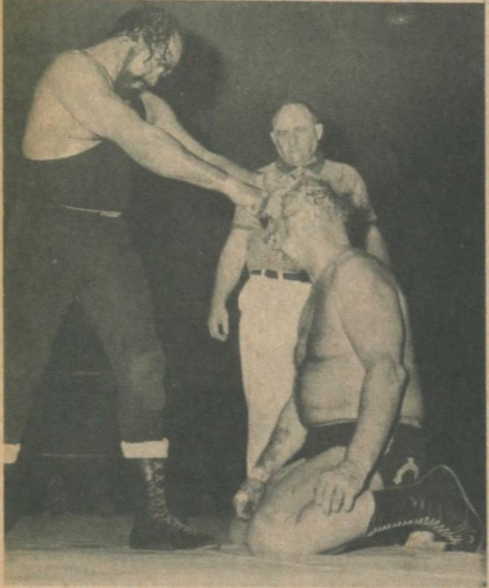
Funk (right) in a 1972 Texas Death match against Ciclón Negro

Funk began promoting Western States Sports with Doc Sarpolis in Amarillo, Texas, where he led a thriving wrestling scene that produced many stars, including his sons Dory Funk Jr. and Terry Funk, as well as Stan Hansen, Harley Race, Gene Kiniski, Tully Blanchard, Ted DiBiase, Tito Santana, Bruiser Brody, Ricky Romero, Jumbo Tsuruta, and Genichiro Tenryu. Many of his wrestlers had played football at West Texas State University in nearby Canyon, Texas. Funk had a good business relationship with All Japan Pro Wrestling founder Shohei Baba, which led Funk's talent pool to useful international experience. Funk was also heavily involved with the Cal Farley Boys Ranch in Amarillo.

On July 15, 2006, Funk was posthumously inducted into the George Tragos/Lou Thesz Professional Wrestling Hall of Fame at the International Wrestling Institute and Museum in Newton, Iowa. The award was accepted by his son, Terry.

== Death ==
Funk died at St. Anthony's Hospital in Amarillo after suffering a heart attack on June 3, 1973, at the age of 54, while demonstrating a wrestling hold at his home to a visitor at his Flying Mare Ranch in Umbarger, Texas. He was buried at Dreamland Cemetery in Canyon, Texas.

== Championships and accomplishments ==
- Championship Wrestling from Florida
  - NWA Florida Southern Tag Team Championship (1 time) - with Jose Lothario
- George Tragos/Lou Thesz Professional Wrestling Hall of Fame
  - Class of 2006
- National Wrestling Alliance
  - NWA Hall of Fame (Class of 2013)
- NWA All-Star Wrestling
  - NWA Pacific Coast Tag Team Championship (Vancouver version) (2 times) - with Lou Thesz (1) and Pancho Pico (1)
- Northland Wresting Enterprises
  - North American Junior Heavyweight Title (Ontario version) (1 time)
- Professional Wrestling Hall of Fame and Museum
  - Class of 2020
- Western States Sports
  - NWA Brass Knuckles Championship (Texas version) (2 times)
  - NWA North American Heavyweight Championship (Amarillo version) (17 times)
  - NWA North American Tag Team Championship (Amarillo version) (7 times) - with Bob Geigel (1), Dick Hutton (1) and Ricky Romero (5)
  - NWA Southwest Junior Heavyweight Championship (8 times)
  - NWA Southwest Tag Team Championship (4 times) - with Cowboy Carlos (2) and Bob Geigel (2)
  - NWA Western States Heavyweight Championship (3 times)
  - NWA World Junior Heavyweight Championship (1 time)
  - NWA World Tag Team Championship (Amarillo version) (4 times) - with Bob Geigel (1), Dick Hutton (2) and Rip Rogers (1)
- Wrestling Observer Newsletter
  - Wrestling Observer Newsletter Hall of Fame (Class of 1996)
- WWE
  - WWE Hall of Fame (Class of 2025 - Legacy wing)
