= Western States Sports =

American professional wrestling promotion

- Founded: 1946
- Defunct: 1981
- Headquarters: Amarillo, Texas, United States
- Founder: Dory Detton
- Owner(s): Dory Detton (1946–1955); Doc Sarpolis and Dory Funk (1955–1967); Dory Funk (1967–1973); Dory Funk Jr. and Terry Funk (1973–1980); Blackjack Mulligan and Dick Murdoch (1980–1981)
- Parent: Southwest States Enterprises

Western States Sports (also known as the Amarillo Territory) was a professional wrestling promotion headquartered in Amarillo, Texas in the United States. Founded by Dory Detton in 1946, the promotion enjoyed its greatest success in the 1960s and 1970s under the management of Dory Funk and, later, his sons Dory Funk Jr. and Terry Funk, with its top performers including the Funks themselves and Ricky Romero. Western States Sports promoted professional wrestling events in multiple cities across West Texas including Amarillo, Abilene, El Paso, Lubbock, Odessa, and San Angelo, along with Albuquerque in New Mexico, Colorado Springs and Pueblo in Colorado, and the Oklahoma Panhandle. Sold by the Funks in 1980, the promotion closed in 1981.

== History ==
Western States Sports was founded by Dory Detton in 1946. Detton staged his first show in the Tri-State Fairgrounds on March 14, 1946, marking the first professional wrestling show to be held in Amarillo in over five years. In October 1951, Southwest States Enterprises joined the National Wrestling Alliance.

In 1955, retired wrestler Karl "Doc" Sarpolis purchased Western States Sports from Detton for $75,000 (equivalent to $880,000 in 2024). He offered local wrestler Dory Funk the opportunity to buy-in to the promotion, which he accepted. In addition to booking the promotion, Funk was its biggest star. Sarpolis was elected president of the NWA in 1962.

Funk's sons, Dory Funk Jr. and Terry Funk, began wrestling for the promotion in the mid-1960s. After Sarpolis died in 1967, Funk purchased his shares from his widow, giving him full ownership of Western States Sports. Dory Funk died in 1973, leaving the Funk brothers as owners of the territory.

In the early 1970s, the Funks developed a working relationship with Giant Baba, owner of the All Japan Pro Wrestling promotion. A talent exchange between the two promotions saw Japanese wrestlers such as Genichiro Tenryu and Jumbo Tsuruta debut in Western States Sports before debuting in AJPW.

By 1980, ticket sales were beginning to decline. The Funk brothers sold the territory to wrestlers Blackjack Mulligan and Dick Murdoch for $20,000 (equivalent to $76,000 in 2024). With business continuing to slump, the promotion closed in 1981.

== Television programming ==
Western States Sports aired an hour-long television program on KFDA-TV (Channel 10) each Saturday afternoon. The program aired in West Texas along with New Mexico and Colorado. It was hosted by Steve Stack. The program featured a combination of matches recorded in the KFDA studios in Amarillo, matches recorded at house shows, interviews, and clips of matches from other territories.

== Championships ==
Championship	Created	Abandoned	Notes
NWA Brass Knuckles Championship (Amarillo version)	1962	1981	The Amarillo version of the NWA Brass Knuckles Championship was created in 1962 when Dory Funk was recognized as the first champion. The championship was abandoned in 1981 when the promotion stopped trading.
NWA International Heavyweight Championship (Amarillo version)	1960	1981	The Amarillo version of the NWA International Heavyweight Championship was created in 1960 when Sonny Myers was recognized as the first champion. The championship was abandoned in 1961. The championship was resurrected in 1974 when Cyclone Negro was billed as having won a tournament. The championship was abandoned once more in 1981 when the promotion stopped trading.
NWA International Tag Team Championship	1959	1975	The Fabulous Kangaroos were recognized as the inaugural NWA International Tag Team Champions (Amarillo version) in 1959. The championship was abandoned in 1963. Dory Funk Jr. and Terry Funk were recognized as champions in 1973, with the championship abandoned once more in 1975.
NWA North American Heavyweight Championship (Amarillo version)	1956	1969	The Amarillo version of the NWA North American Heavyweight Championship was created in 1956 when Jim Wright was recognized as the first champion. From 1956 to 1969 it was the premiere singles championship in NWA Western States Sports. The championship was abandoned in 1969 when the NWA Western States Heavyweight Championship was introduced.
NWA North American Tag Team Championship (Amarillo version)	1963	1967	The Amarillo version of the NWA North American Tag Team Championship was created in 1963 when Sputnik Monroe and Tokyo Tom were recognized as the first champions. The championship was abandoned in 1967.
NWA Southwest Junior Heavyweight Championship	1947	1959	The NWA Southwest Junior Heavyweight Championship was created in 1947 when Al Getz won a tournament. The championship was unified with the NWA North American Heavyweight Championship (Amarillo version) in 1959.
NWA Southwest States Heavyweight Championship	1957	1968	The NWA Southwest States Heavyweight Championship was created in 1957 when Art Nelson won a tournament. The championship was abandoned in 1968.
NWA Southwest States Tag Team Championship	1952	1965	The NWA Southwest States Tag Team Championship was created in 1952 when Dory Funk and Frankie Hill Murdoch won a tournament. The championship was retired in 1956. The championship was revived in 1962 and retired once more in 1965.
NWA Television Championship (Amarillo version)	1973	1979	The Amarillo version of the NWA Television Championship was created in 1973 when Nick Kozak was recognized as the first champion. The championship was abandoned in 1979.
NWA Texas Tag Team Championship	1951	1963	The Amarillo version of the NWA Texas Tag Team Championship was created in 1951 when Ivan Kalmikoff and Jack O'Reilly were recognized as the first champions. The championship was abandoned in 1963 when the promotion began recognizing the NWA North American Tag Team Championship (Amarillo version).
NWA Western States Heavyweight Championship	1969	1981	The NWA Western States Heavyweight Championship was created in 1969 when the NWA North American Heavyweight Champion Dory Funk began to be billed as the NWA Western States Heavyweight Champion. From 1969 to 1981 it was the premiere singles championship in NWA Western States Sports. The championship was abandoned in 1981 when the promotion stopped trading.
NWA Western States Tag Team Championship	1969	1981	The NWA Western States Tag Team Championship was created in 1969 when the NWA World Tag Team Champions Chati Yokouchi and Mr. Ito began to be billed as the NWA Western States Tag Team Champions. The championship was abandoned in 1981 when the promotion stopped trading.
NWA World Tag Team Championship (Amarillo version)	1955	1968	The Amarillo version of the NWA World Tag Team Championship was established in 1955 when Art Nelson and Reggie Lisowski were recognized as the inaugural champions. The championship was abandoned in 1968 when it was replaced by the NWA Western States Tag Team Championship.
World Heavyweight Championship (Amarillo version)	1962	1963	During a period of poor relations with the National Wrestling Alliance, Western States Sports began recognizing Gene Kiniski as its own World Heavyweight Champion in 1962 after he defeated NWA World Heavyweight Champion Buddy Rogers on four occasions. The championship was retired in 1963 when relations with the NWA improved and Western States Sports resumed recognition of the NWA World Heavyweight Championship.

== Alumni ==
- Bob Backlund
- Killer Tim Brooks
- Cyclone Negro
- Ted DiBiase
- Dory Funk
- Dory Funk Jr.
- Terry Funk
- Gory Guerrero
- Swede Hanson
- Rip Hawk
- Gene LeBell
- Wahoo McDaniel
- Sputnik Monroe
- Pedro Morales
- Dick Murdoch
- Thunderbolt Patterson
- Harley Race
- Dusty Rhodes
- Ricky Romero
- Merced Solis
- Dennis Stamp
- Jumbo Tsuruta
- Maurice Vachon
- Bill Watts
- Johnny Weaver
