= Body Slam (film) =

1986 film by Hal Needham

- Directed by: Hal Needham
- Screenplay by: Shel Lytton; Steve Burkow
- Story by: Shel Lytton
- Produced by: Mike Curb; Shel Lytton
- Starring: Dirk Benedict; Tanya Roberts; Roddy Piper; Lou Albano; Barry Gordon
- Cinematography: Mike Shea
- Edited by: Randy Thornton
- Music by: Michael Lloyd; John D'Andrea
- Production company: Hemdale Film Corporation
- Distributed by: Hemdale Film Corporation
- Release date: September 10, 1986
- Running time: 89 minutes
- Country: United States
- Language: English

Body Slam is a 1986 American comedy film directed by Hal Needham and starring Dirk Benedict, Roddy Piper, Tanya Roberts, Sam Fatu, and Captain Lou Albano. The film revolves around down-and-out music promoter M. Harry Smilac who inadvertently becomes a successful professional wrestling manager. After being exiled from the business by rival manager Captain Lou Marano, he finds success in promoting shows that feature both wrestling and rock music. The film features many well-known wrestlers of the time and references the Rock 'n' Wrestling era of professional wrestling. Needham had arguments with Shel Lytton and Steve Burkow, the pair that produced and wrote the film, regarding his changes to the script. This resulted in lawsuits that delayed the film's release. As a result, the film only saw a theatrical release in the state of Arizona, outside of that state, it was released direct-to-video. It was Needham's final theatrical film.

== Plot ==
M. Harry Smilac, once a successful music promoter, is having a hard time attracting talent and booking gigs for his sole client, the rock band Kick. Behind on his car payments and owing a large amount to a banker, he reluctantly accepts a job finding musical acts for the fundraiser of unpopular politician Norman Wiltshire. Although not entirely happy with his new gig, Smilac finds a love interest in Candace Vandervagen, the daughter of Wiltshire's wealthy campaign booster Bitsy.

While making arrangements for the fundraiser, Smilac mistakes pro wrestler "Quick" Rick Roberts for a musician and hires him. Having zero luck as a music manager, Smilac decides to stick with his hunch about Roberts and become a pro wrestling manager, booking matches for Roberts and his teammate Tonga Tom. The team is a success but politics come into play when Smilac clashes with Rick's former manager, the villainous Captain Lou Murano. A day after a disastrous fundraiser featuring Kick, Murano and his tag team champions The Cannibals (Axe and Hammer) injure Smilac and his wrestlers in a nationally televised bout, before blacklisting them from every major arena in the country.

Recovering from their injuries and on the fringes of both the music and wrestling industries, Smilac decides to take his wrestlers and his band on a cross country road tour of small arenas. Initially, he promotes separate wrestling and rock shows but a scheduling mix-up at a venue causes him to promote a single event featuring both music and wrestling. The show is well received and Smilac schedules an entire tour using the same "Rock n' Wrestling" format. Their tour is a huge success, which angers Captain Lou. On a televised appearance, Smilac challenges Captain Lou's Cannibals to a match for the World Tag Team Championships on behalf of his wrestlers Rick and Tonga Tom. After a hard fought match, Rick and Tom have beaten the Cannibals to win the title belts and become the new champions.

== Cast ==
- Dirk Benedict as M. Harry Smilac. He was Hal Needham's first choice for the role based on Benedict's work on the television show The A-Team. Although Benedict had previously worked with professional wrestler Hulk Hogan on an episode of The A-Team, Benedict only found out about the scripted nature of professional wrestling through his work on this film.
- Tanya Roberts as Candace Vandervagen
- Roddy Piper as Quick Rick Roberts. Piper was best known for his work with the World Wrestling Federation. He would go on to star in other films such as John Carpenter's They Live and Hell Comes to Frogtown.
- Lou Albano as Captain Lou Murano, mostly based on Albano's own Captain Lou manager persona in the professional wrestling business. Albano would also follow his appearance in this film with a successful secondary career as a character actor.
- Barry Gordon as Sheldon Brockmeister
- Charles Nelson Reilly as Vic Carson. Reilly had previously starred in another Hal Needham film, Cannonball Run II.
- Billy Barty as Tim McClusky, a heel wrestling manager
- John Astin as Scotty, a car dealer
- Sam Fatu as Tonga Tom. Fatu is a member of wrestling's famed Anoa'i family. His most well known ring name is The Tonga Kid.
- Dani Crayne as Bitsy Vanderhagen
- Sydney Lassick as Shapiro, Harry's lawyer
- John Fujioka as Mr. Kim, a loan shark
- Afa Anoa'i and Sika Anoa'i as The Samoans. Like Fatu, both are members of the Anoa'i family. The two star as bodyguards in the film in non-speaking roles. However, they also had successful real life wrestling careers as the tag team The Wild Samoans, with Lou Albano as their manager. The duo was inducted into the WWE Hall of Fame in 2007.
- Kellie Martin as Missy Roberts. Several years after starring in the movie, a 14-year-old Martin mentioned that the film never made it to theaters and called it "kind of a flop."
- Sione Vailahi and Thomas Leroy Kasat as Axe and Hammer, The Cannibals. Both were professional wrestlers, and infrequently teamed for Jim Crockett Promotions house shows in 1986. Vailahi is best known for his work in World Wrestling Federation and World Championship Wrestling as The Barbarian. The duo staged a real fight with Piper and Fatu during the filming of the movie's final match so the crowd of extras would take them seriously.
- Ron Ulstad as Norman Wiltshire
- Chick Hearn as himself, the guest announcer for the final match
- Wrestling personalities Ric Flair, Freddie Blassie, Adnan Al-Kaissie, Bruno Sammartino and Alexis Smirnoff appear in cameos as audience members during the film's final match.

== Production and Release ==
In an interview with Canadian Online Explorer, Dirk Benedict recounts positive experiences working on the film. However, both he and director Hal Needham clashed with Shel Lytton and Steve Burkow, the two lawyers credited with writing and producing the film over changes to the script and Needham's creative choices. At one point, Benedict had a physical altercation with one Burkow. These conflicts led to lawsuits being filed, which caused the film to miss the entire summer movie season. Later, the film was slated to be released by Hemdale Film Corporation in November 1986. The film never saw wide theatrical release and was instead released directly to VHS in most of the United States.

On March 15, 2011, Body Slam was brought to DVD as part of the MGM Limited Edition Collection series. On June 15, 2021, distributor Kino Lorber released Body Slam on Blu-Ray.

== Reception ==
The film was met with mixed reviews. TV Guide rated it at two stars, describing it as a "raucous action comedy with a certain (admittedly dubious) historical appeal." Mick Martin and Marsha Porter also gave it two stars, calling the film "silly" but saying that it had "a lot of heart." Leonard Maltin gave the film two-and-a-half stars, calling Benedict's performance "charming" and lamenting that the film was not widely released, saying that it "deserved better." Variety gave the film a positive review, calling it a "pleasant surprise" and "genuinely funny." They praised Dirk Benedict's performance and called the film a "solid comeback" for director Hal Needham.
