= Pro Wrestling USA =

American professional wrestling promotion

- Founded: 1984
- Defunct: 1985
- Style: American Wrestling
- Headquarters: United States (1984–1985)
- Founder(s): Jerry Jarrett; Jerry Lawler; Verne Gagne; Ole Anderson; Jim Crockett, Jr.

Pro Wrestling USA was a professional wrestling promotion in the United States in the mid-1980s. It was an attempt to unify various federations, including the American Wrestling Association (AWA), Jim Crockett Promotions and other members of the National Wrestling Alliance (NWA), against the national expansion of the World Wrestling Federation.

== Background ==
By 1984, Vince McMahon had begun moves to take the World Wrestling Federation national, and bought out Georgia Championship Wrestling. This was in total disregard to the National Wrestling Alliance (NWA) and its territory system. Vince now had the national TBS timeslot. Despite this move being unsuccessful, McMahon was also able to air the historic "Brawl to End it All" and "War to Settle the Score" wrestling cards on MTV; in addition, McMahon also still had the most recognized wrestler in the industry, Hulk Hogan. In a bid to counter the new threat, various promoters across America decided to co-promote wrestling shows.

== Joint venture ==
Jerry Lawler and Jerry Jarrett of the Continental Wrestling Association, Verne Gagne of the American Wrestling Association, Ole Anderson of Championship Wrestling from Georgia, Jim Crockett Promotions, and other NWA promoters got together to co-promote wrestling shows nationally. This joint venture became known as Pro Wrestling USA.

This loose alliance of promoters from across America was to serve as a national federation. Pro Wrestling USA shows could boast, for example, an AWA and NWA World Title match on the same card.

While at the behest of Jerry Lawler and Jerry Jarrett the first show took place in Memphis, Tennessee, Pro Wrestling USA shows were promoted across the member's territories. Further, many Pro Wrestling USA shows were taped in East Rutherford, New Jersey, in the heart of the WWF's traditional territory. This was a serious attempt to undermine the WWF, in its home turf, at a moment of financial weakness.

The peak of Pro Wrestling USA came at SuperClash, in Chicago. Over 21,000 people filed into Comiskey Park on September 28, 1985. The card for the show was headlined by Ric Flair vs. Magnum T. A. for the NWA World Heavyweight Championship, and Rick Martel vs. Stan Hansen for the AWA World Heavyweight Championship.

The arrangement, however, would only remain in existence for a few more months, as arguments between promoters, primarily Gagne and Crockett, severed the ties. Crockett opted to leave the group, and within months, the Pro Wrestling USA shows were simply repackaged AWA programs.

== After Pro Wrestling USA ==
World Class Championship Wrestling, which was depending on a strong buy-rate for SuperClash III to survive at this point, ended up insolvent. Briefly, there was a union of some of the promotions who co-promoted SuperClash III. WCCW merged with Jarrett's CWA, eventually to form the United States Wrestling Association (USWA), again an attempt to create a third national promotion behind Jim Crockett Promotions/WCW and the WWF. However once again the union was short lived, and WCCW withdrew from the USWA and soon went out of business. Jarrett's USWA remained for the next decade as the last traditional wrestling promotion, but never achieved the national success intended by the CWA/WCCW merger.

The 1988 union of the AWA, CWA, and WCCW was not known as Pro Wrestling USA, and their shows were just advertised as cross-promotional events.

== See also ==
- List of independent wrestling promotions in the United States
