= 1978 in professional wrestling =

1978 in professional wrestling describes the year's events in the world of professional wrestling.

== List of notable promotions ==
These promotions held notable shows in 1978.

Promotion Name	Abbreviation
All Japan Pro Wrestling	AJPW
Championship Wrestling from Florida	CWF
Empresa Mexicana de Lucha Libre	EMLL
National Wrestling Alliance	NWA
New Japan Pro Wrestling	NJPW
World Wide Wrestling Federation	WWWF
Universal Wrestling Association	UWA

== Calendar of notable shows ==
Date	Promotion(s)	Event	Location	Main Event
January 25	UWA	3rd Anniversary Show	Naucalpan	Mil Máscaras (c) defeated Temojin el Mongol during a 2-out-of-3 Falls Match for the UWA World Heavyweight Championship
January 25	NWA; WWWF; CWF	Superbowl of Wrestling	Miami, Florida	"Superstar" Billy Graham (c - WWWF World Championship) vs. Harley Race (c - NWA Worlds Heavyweight Championship) ended in a 60-minute time limit draw during a three fall match
February 23	NWA; WWWF; CWF	NWA/WWWF World Title Unification	Jacksonville, Florida	Bob Backlund (c - WWWF World Championship) vs. Harley Race (c - NWA Worlds Heavyweight Championship) ended in a 60-minute time limit draw
April 7	AJPW	Champion Carnival	Sendai, Miyagi, Japan	Giant Baba defeated Abdullah the Butcher by count-out
April 21	EMLL	22. Aniversario de Arena México	Mexico City, Mexico	El Faraón and Ringo Mendoza defeated Alfonso Dantés and Sangre Chicana in a Lucha de Apuestas hair vs. hair match
May 30	NJPW	MSG League	Tokyo, Japan	Antonio Inoki defeated André the Giant by count-out
September 22	EMLL	EMLL 45th Anniversary Show	Mexico City, Mexico	Sangre Chicana and Rubí Rubalcava defeated El Cobarde and Dragón Rojo in a Lucha de Apuestas hair and mask vs. hair and hair match
October 29	NWA; WWWF; CWF	NWA/WWWF World Title Unification	Orlando, Florida	Bob Backlund (c - WWWF World Championship) vs. Harley Race (c - NWA Worlds Heavyweight Championship) ended in a draw
December 8	EMLL	Juicio Final	Mexico City, Mexico	Kung Fu defeated El Idolo in a Lucha de Apuestas, mask vs. mask match
(c) – denotes defending champion(s)

== Notable events ==
- February 20 - Bob Backlund pinned Superstar Billy Graham at New York's Madison Square Garden to become the new World Wide Wrestling Federation Heavyweight Champion.
- March 14 - on WWWF Championship Wrestling, Dominic DeNucci and Dino Bravo beat Mr. Fuji and Professor Tanaka to become the new World Wide Wrestling Federation Tag Team Champions.
- June 26 - At New York's Madison Square Garden, The Yukon Lumberjacks beat Dominic DeNucci and Dino Bravo to become the new World Wide Wrestling Federation Tag Team Champions.
- November 21 - Tony Garea and Larry Zbyszko beat the Yukon Lumberjacks to become the new World Wide Wrestling Federation Tag Team Champions.

== Accomplishments and tournaments ==
=== AJW ===
Accomplishment	Winner	Date won	Notes
Rookie of the Year Decision Tournament	Hiroko Komine		

== Awards and honors ==
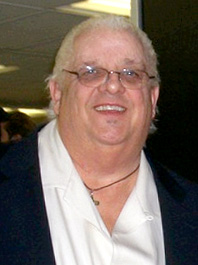
1978 PWI Wrestler of the Year, Dusty Rhodes

=== Pro Wrestling Illustrated ===
Category	Winner
PWI Wrestler of the Year	Dusty Rhodes
PWI Tag Team of the Year	Ricky Steamboat and Paul Jones
PWI Match of the Year	Superstar Billy Graham vs. Bob Backlund
PWI Most Popular Wrestler of the Year	Dusty Rhodes
PWI Most Hated Wrestler of the Year	Ric Flair
PWI Most Improved Wrestler of the Year	Dino Bravo
PWI Most Inspirational Wrestler of the Year	Blackjack Mulligan
PWI Rookie of the Year	Tommy Rich
PWI Manager of the Year	Arnold Skaaland

== Championship changes ==
=== EMLL ===
NWA World Light Heavyweight Championship
incoming champion – Alfonso Dantés
Date	Winner	Event/Show	Note(s)
June 2	El Faraón	EMLL show	
December 8	Pak Choo	EMLL show	

NWA World Middleweight Championship
Incoming champion – El Faraón
Date	Winner	Event/Show	Note(s)
February 17	Ringo Mendoza	EMLL show	
April 9	Perro Aguayo	EMLL show	
June 23	Ringo Mendoza	EMLL show	
August 13	Tony Salazar	EMLL show	

NWA World Welterweight Championship
Incoming champion – Mano Negra
No title changes

Mexican National Heavyweight Championship
Incoming champion – Raul Mata
Date	Winner	Event/Show	Note(s)
July 1	El Nazi	EMLL show	
October 27	TNT	EMLL show	

Mexican National Middleweight Championship
Incoming champion – Sangre Chicana
Date	Winner	Event/Show	Note(s)
No title changes

Mexican National Lightweight Championship
Incoming champion – Mario Valenzuela
Date	Winner	Event/Show	Note(s)
August 30	Talisman	EMLL show	

Mexican National Light Heavyweight Championship
Incoming champion – Dr. Wagner
Date	Winner	Event/Show	Note(s)
January 15	El Canek	EMLL show	
June 20	Dos Caras	EMLL show	

Mexican National Welterweight Championship
Incoming champion – Kung Fu
Date	Winner	Event/Show	Note(s)
April 2	Fishman	EMLL show	
December 10	Kung Fu	EMLL show	

Mexican National Women's Championship
Incoming champion – Uncertain
No title changes

=== NWA ===
NWA Worlds Heavyweight Championship
Incoming champion – Harley Race
No title changes

== Births ==
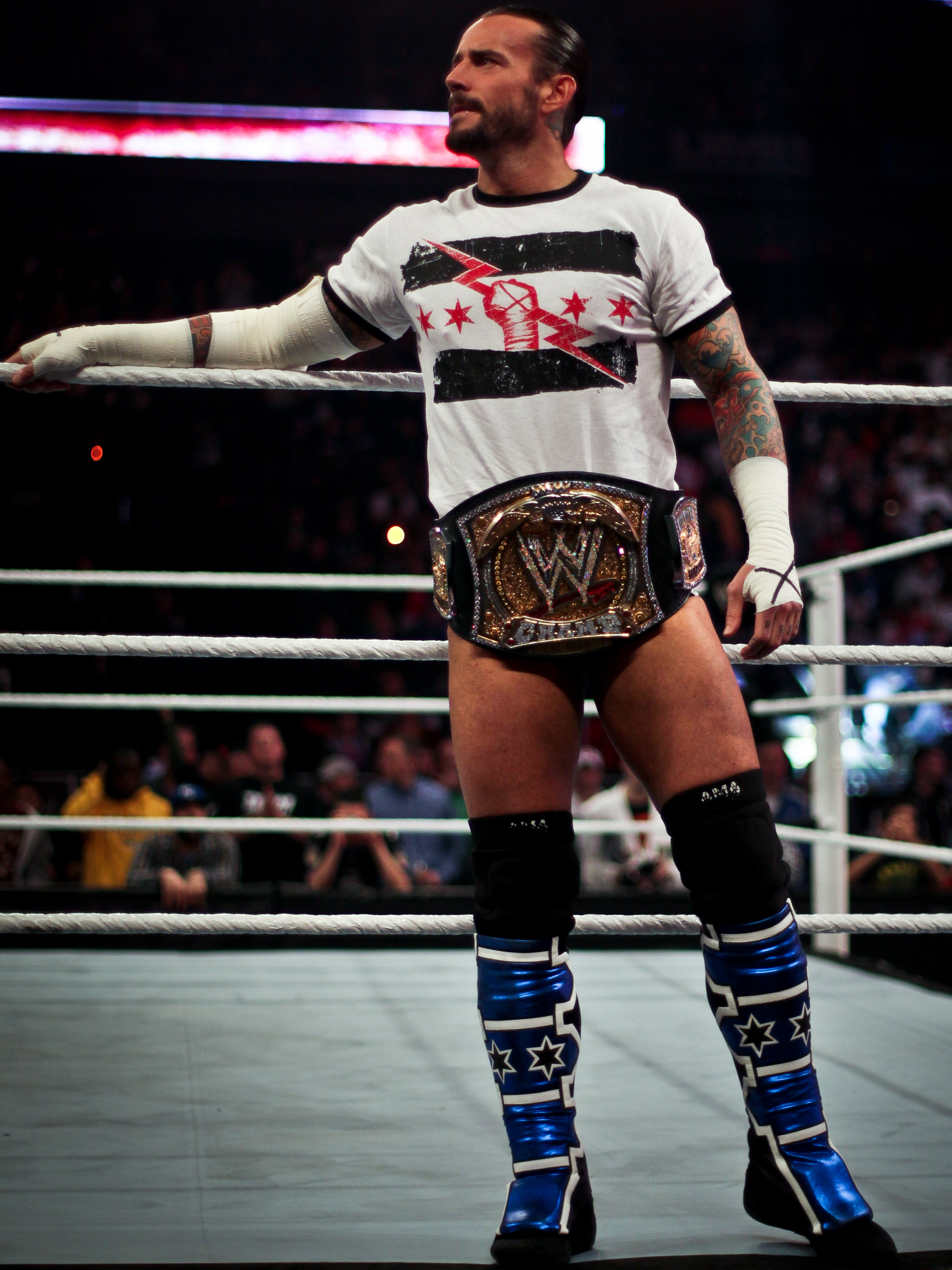
CM Punk

- January 10 – Tamina
- January 20 - Joy Giovanni
- January 25 - B. J. Whitmer
- January 28 – Sheamus
- February 2 - Abraham Washington
- February 17 - Shiori Asahi
- March 1 - D. J. Hyde
- March 6 - Chad Wicks
- March 14 - Kaori Nakayama
- March 30 – Crazy Boy
- April 7 - Mana the Polynesian Warrior
- April 13 – SeXXXy Eddy
- April 16 – Austin Aries
- April 22 – Ezekiel Jackson
- May 15 - Keith Walker
- May 16 - Justice Pain (died in 2020)
- May 18 - Toru Yano
- May 22 - Daniel Rodimer
- May 24 – Elijah Burke
- June 2 – Joe Líder
- June 6 – ODB
- June 8 – Maria Menounos
- June 19 - Tyson Dux
- June 20 - Quinton Jackson
- June 24 – Adam Pearce
- July 17:
  - Akira Raijin
  - Mike Knox
- July 21 - Beer City Bruiser
- August 15 - Ruckus
- August 21 - Ricky Reyes
- August 27 - Kafu
- August 28 – Linda Miles
- September 8 - Rebel
- September 19 - Vinnie Massaro
- September 24 – Christopher Nowinski
- September 30 – Candice Michelle
- October 9 - Brian Hebner
- October 15 – Takeshi Morishima
- October 18 - Jaime Koeppe
- October 26 – CM Punk
- November 1 - Tyler Reks
- November 6 - Johnny Kashmere
- November 12 - Lena Yada
- November 21:
  - Mini Abismo Negro
  - Choun Shiryu
- November 28 - Brent Albright
- December 13 - Antonio Thomas
- December 20 - Armando Estrada
- December 23 – Nanae Takahashi

== Debuts ==
=== Debut Date ===
- June 2 - Chino Sato (All Japan Women's)*
- June 23 - Ashura Hara
- August 21 - Devil Masami
- August 26 - Hiro Saito
- August 31 - Terry Daniels
- December 2 - Jumbo Hori (All Japan Women's)
- December 6 - Matt Borne

=== Date Unknown ===
- Chicky Starr
- Kamala
- Koko B. Ware
- Jim Neidhart
- Buzz Sawyer
- Hugo Savinovich
- Rocco Rock
- Johnny Grunge
- Stan Lane
- Mimi Hagiwara (All Japan Women's)

== Retirements ==
- Arnold Skaaland (1946–1978)
- Joe Turco (1956–1978)

== Deaths ==
- March 27 - John Pesek, 84
- June 30 – Michel Martel, 33
- August 13 – Lonnie Mayne, 33
- November 15 - Willie Gilzenberg, 77
- November 16 – Eric the Red, 44
- December 12 - Mike Thomas Farhat, 27
- December 20 - Robin Reed, 79
