= Lou Albano =

American professional wrestler and manager, and actor (1933–2009)

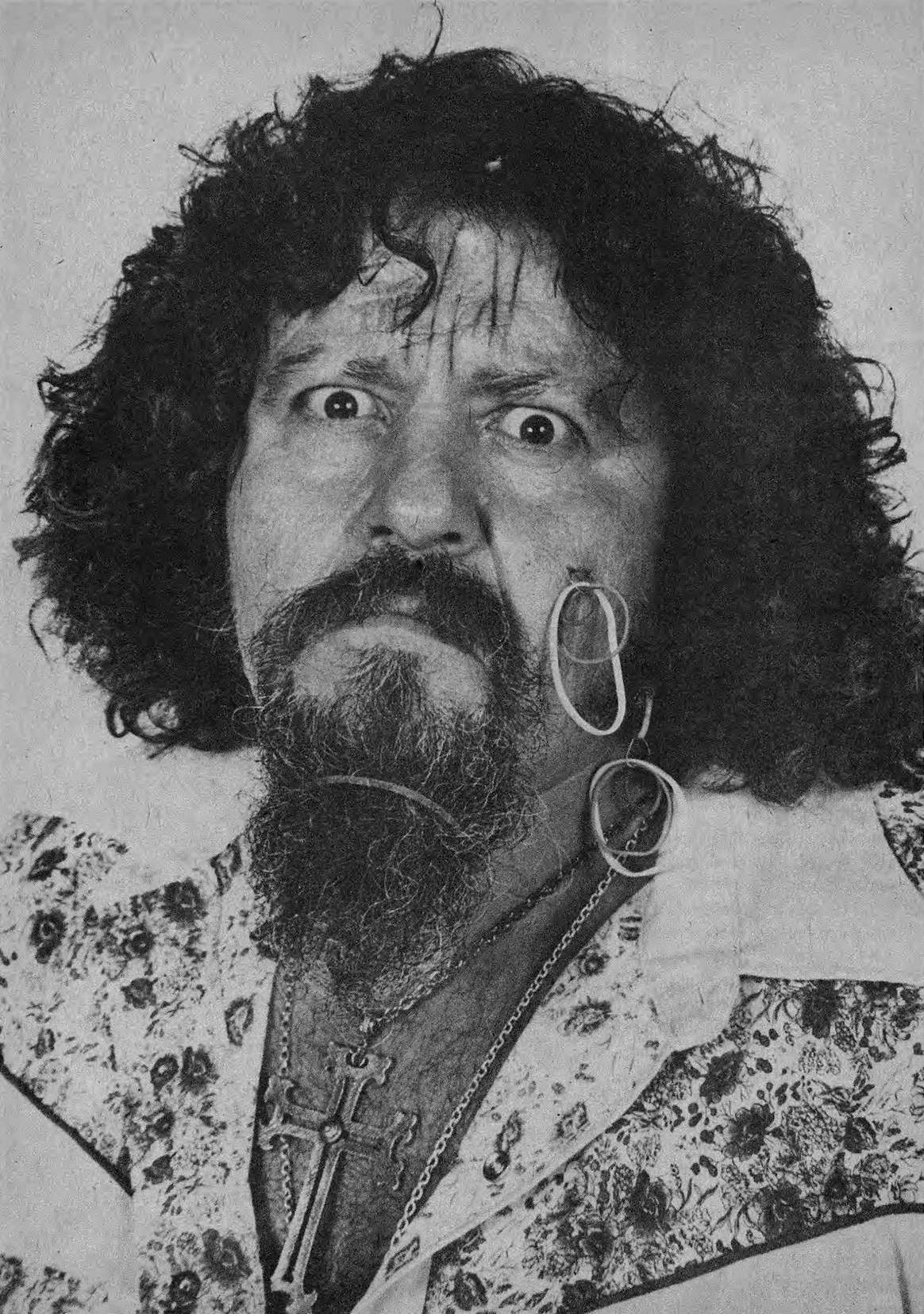
- Publicity photograph, circa 1985

Personal information
- Born: Louis Vincent Albano; July 29, 1933 Rome, Lazio, Kingdom of Italy
- Died: October 14, 2009 (aged 76) Westchester County, New York, U.S.
- Cause of death: Heart attack
- Spouse: Geraldine Tango (m. 1953)
- Children: 4

Professional wrestling career
- Ring name(s): Lou Albano; The Captain
- Billed height: 5 ft 10 in (178 cm)
- Billed weight: 350 lb (159 kg)
- Billed from: Carmel, New York
- Trained by: Arnold Skaaland; Soldier Barry
- Debut: 1953
- Retired: 1969 (as wrestler); 1996 (as manager)

Louis Vincent Albano (July 29, 1933 – October 14, 2009) was an Italian-American professional wrestler, manager and actor, who performed under the ring/stage name "Captain" Lou Albano. He was active as a professional wrestler from 1953 until 1969, before becoming a manager until 1996.

Over the course of his 42-year career, Albano guided 15 different tag teams and three singles competitors to championship gold, including The Valiant Brothers, The Wild Samoans, The Yukon Lumberjacks, The Blackjacks, The Moondogs, The Executioners, and after becoming a babyface, the U.S. Express and The British Bulldogs. Albano was one of the "Triumvirate of Terror", a threesome of nefarious WWF managers which included The Grand Wizard of Wrestling and Freddie Blassie. The trio was a fixture in the company for a decade until The Grand Wizard's death in 1983. Albano is widely regarded as one of the greatest managers in the history of wrestling.

A unique showman, with an elongated beard, rubber band facial piercings, and loud outfits, Albano was the forefather of the 1980s Rock 'n' Wrestling Connection. Working first with NRBQ and later with Cyndi Lauper, Albano helped usher in wrestling's crossover success with a mainstream audience. Capitalizing on his success, he later ventured into Hollywood with various television, film, and music projects. He became well known to a younger generation of fans for his portrayal as Mario in The Super Mario Bros. Super Show!.

== Early life ==
Albano was born on July 29, 1933, in Rome, Italy. His parents, Carmen Louis Albano (1905–1962) and Eleanor Albano née Marrone (1907–1982), were of Italian heritage but were both born in the United States. Eleanor was a classical concert pianist who had performed at Carnegie Hall and later became a registered nurse. In the 1930s, her brother, a physician, introduced her to Carmen, a former amateur wrestler who was training to be an obstetrician. After marrying, they temporarily relocated to Italy while Carmen pursued his medical degree at the University of Bari. Lou was born around the time his father was studying. He was one of nine children, of whom five lived to adulthood. Carmen later co-patented a forceps instrument to assist in breech birth deliveries. Lou was baptized in Vatican City, and his parents shortly thereafter returned to the New York City area aboard the RMS Majestic.

The Albano family settled in the Mount Vernon, New York area. Lou attended Archbishop Stepinac High School in White Plains, New York, where he competed in track and field, and finally rose to the position of captain of the football team. It was this rank that later inspired his wrestling moniker, "Captain" Lou Albano. His skills were such that he received 32 offers of full scholarship from universities around the country, and he chose the University of Tennessee on the strength of their football team. Here, Albano was teammates with the likes of Darris McCord, Doug Atkins, and his roommate, Sam Rutigliano. Albano had conflicts with the dean due to poor behavior and was expelled after attempting to cheat on a final exam.

After leaving the University of Tennessee, Albano then joined the United States Army, but due to a childhood injury exacerbated by his football days, he was honorably discharged after only eight months. While stationed at Fort Dix, he was exposed to professional wrestling, seeing the likes of Gorgeous George, Arnold Skaaland, Soldier Barry, and Lenny Montana—all of whom Albano later worked with.

== Professional wrestling career ==
=== Early career (1953–1967) ===
Although Albano's father, retired from medicine, wanted to open an insurance agency with his son, Lou instead began training as a boxer. A distant cousin and family friend, Lou Duva, introduced Albano to Willie Gilzenberg, a boxing promoter who later became the first titular president of the WWWF. Gilzenberg, noting Albano's relatively short stature, instead encouraged him to enter wrestling. Gilzenberg asked Soldier Barry to help train Albano, and in 1952, the two began doing house shows in the New York area.

Albano was originally seen as a "pretty boy," and wrestled as the babyface "Leaping Lou Albano". After a non-wrestling injury caused a gash on his forehead, he purposely did not allow the scar to heal, and the minor disfigurement allowed him to turn heel. Now billed as the "Mount Vernon Mauler," and occasionally a pirate, he began establishing himself in the New York professional wrestling community. At this point, Gilzenberg introduced Albano to Vincent J. McMahon, promoter of the new Capitol Wrestling Corporation in Washington, D.C.—the first predecessor to what is today WWE. Albano worked for Capitol Wrestling and its successors, under Vince McMahon and his son, for most of the rest of his career.

Albano made little impact as a solo wrestler, working prelims in various circuits, but he achieved moderate success as a tag team performer with partner Tony Altomare. Dubbed The Sicilians, Altomare and Albano competed as a stereotypical Italian gangster combo in the mode of the then-popular television series The Untouchables. The pair won the Midwest Tag Team Championship on the undercard of the June 30, 1961 Comiskey Park event starring Pat O'Connor and Buddy Rogers that set the all-time record gate in the United States to that point. Their realistic depiction of gangster characters caught the attention of actual mafiosi in 1961. In Chicago, Tony Accardo and two associates "requested" that Albano and Altomare cease using the word "mafia". During their run as Midwest Tag Team Champions, personal differences with bookers and other wrestlers resulted in the pair abandoning the territory quickly enough that they did not lose the title before leaving.

=== World Wide Wrestling Federation / World Wrestling Federation (1964–1987) ===
==== Singles wrestler (1964–1967) ====
In 1964, Albano wrestled for the World Wide Wrestling Federation as a singles competitor where he wrestled against Bobo Brazil, Gorilla Monsoon, Miguel Pérez and Bill Watts.

==== The Sicilians (1967–1969) ====
Albano returned in 1967 and again partnered with Tony Altomare as "The Sicilians". In July, they won the WWWF United States Tag Team Championship from Arnold Skaaland and Spiros Arion. Albano and Altomare only held the championship for two weeks, a title change which was not even acknowledged on WWWF television outside the Atlantic City, New Jersey market. But several photographs of the pair with their title belts were taken, which elevated Albano's reputation in the wrestling magazines of the time, and provided good publicity fodder later in his career. In late 1969, The Sicilians disbanded and went their separate ways.

==== Singles wrestler (1969–1970) ====
In late 1969, Albano returned to competition as a singles competitor until late 1970, when he largely stepped back from active in-ring wrestling to focus on work as a manager.

==== Career as a manager (1970–1986) ====
In 1970, fellow wrestler Bruno Sammartino opined to Vincent J. McMahon that Albano, a mediocre wrestler who was nonetheless an entertaining speaker, might be better utilized as a manager. In professional wrestling, a manager might be tasked with behind-the-scenes efforts to help push forward a charge's career or handle his booking, but plays an equal or even greater role in the ring, speaking for his charge and helping rile up the crowd for or against him. Sammartino recalled: "One day I said to Vince Sr., this guy [Albano] isn't the best wrestler, as a team, they [Albano & Altomare] can only go so far. But he'd be a great mouthpiece for some guy. Lou has such a gift of gab that he can help out some people. As a wrestler, he just seemed limited. He was always the same. He was never looked upon by promoters as someone who could be anyone special. But as a manager, he shined. That was his calling." Albano, realizing that wrestlers had only a limited lifespan in the ring, and still dealing with his old football injury, agreed. Although it was his decision to split up his ten-year tag team partnership with Altomare, the two remained very close until the latter's death in 2003.

At this time, managers were relatively rare in the pro wrestling world—WWWF had only two others. However, a promising new wrestler, Oscar "Crusher" Verdu, had just recently emigrated from Spain. His in-ring capabilities were hampered by a limited command of English, and Albano was assigned to be his mouthpiece. Albano emphasized Verdu's physique and insisted that he had never been taken off his feet during a match. To rile up audiences, he also engaged in ethnic slurs, which were then a more common part of WWWF banter; Albano promised that Verdu would stomp on "that Italian" (Sammartino); the fact that Albano was known to be Italian himself only heightened the audience's reaction. Sammartino later said, "They wanted to see me beat the hell out of Verdu to make Albano a liar. He could get the kind of heat that nobody else could." The result was a Madison Square Garden sellout when Verdu faced Sammartino in June 1970, the first for the company in five years and a then-record gate for a wrestling event in that arena. The record lasted only a month, when a rematch brought in over $85,000 in ticket receipts. After losing that match, Verdu cycled out of the WWWF rotation, but Albano remained as the top heel manager for the next 15 years.

Thus began his transition into the brash, bombastic manager "Captain" Lou Albano. With a quick wit and a grating personality, Albano delivered memorable promos and earned the scorn of the wrestling audience as he attempted to dethrone WWWF Champion Bruno Sammartino. Albano described the strategy behind his overblown, ranting interview style: "I just remember the point I wanna bring across, and then I just babble before, during, and after. Somehow, in the middle, I said the two or three sentences that sold tickets. Mostly, I just tried to make people want to see me get my ass kicked, and along the way, hopefully the guy I was managing would catch a beating too!" Growing out his hair and beard, and packing on extra pounds, Albano gave the image of a wild man. He developed a later trademark, applying rubber bands to his beard, after having seen a homeless man do the same. He also often wore a rubber band hanging from a safety pin pushed through his cheek.

In January 1971, Albano was the manager when Ivan Koloff ended Sammartino's seven-year reign as champion. Koloff's title reign was a transitional one, lasting just three weeks. Koloff had a typical heel run against Sammartino in 1969, but Albano spent months claiming that his previous manager Tony Angelo had trained him incorrectly, and that Koloff would beat Sammartino under Albano's expert tutelage. The shock of Koloff's victory was such that the crowd fell totally silent, and Sammartino momentarily feared that he had lost his hearing. Koloff and Albano were quickly rushed out of the ring by security without the championship belt as the crowd began to riot. Albano, his wife, and a family friend, who were both in attendance, escaped to a taxi outside the Garden. The mob surrounded the cab and began breaking windows, so the trio ran to a nearby bar, followed by the crowd who were pelting them with mud and objects. The mob was beginning to destroy the bar as the police finally arrived. Vince McMahon received a bill for damages totaling $27,000 (equivalent to $215,000 in 2025), cementing Albano's unparalleled ability to "draw heat" (arouse anger in the audience).

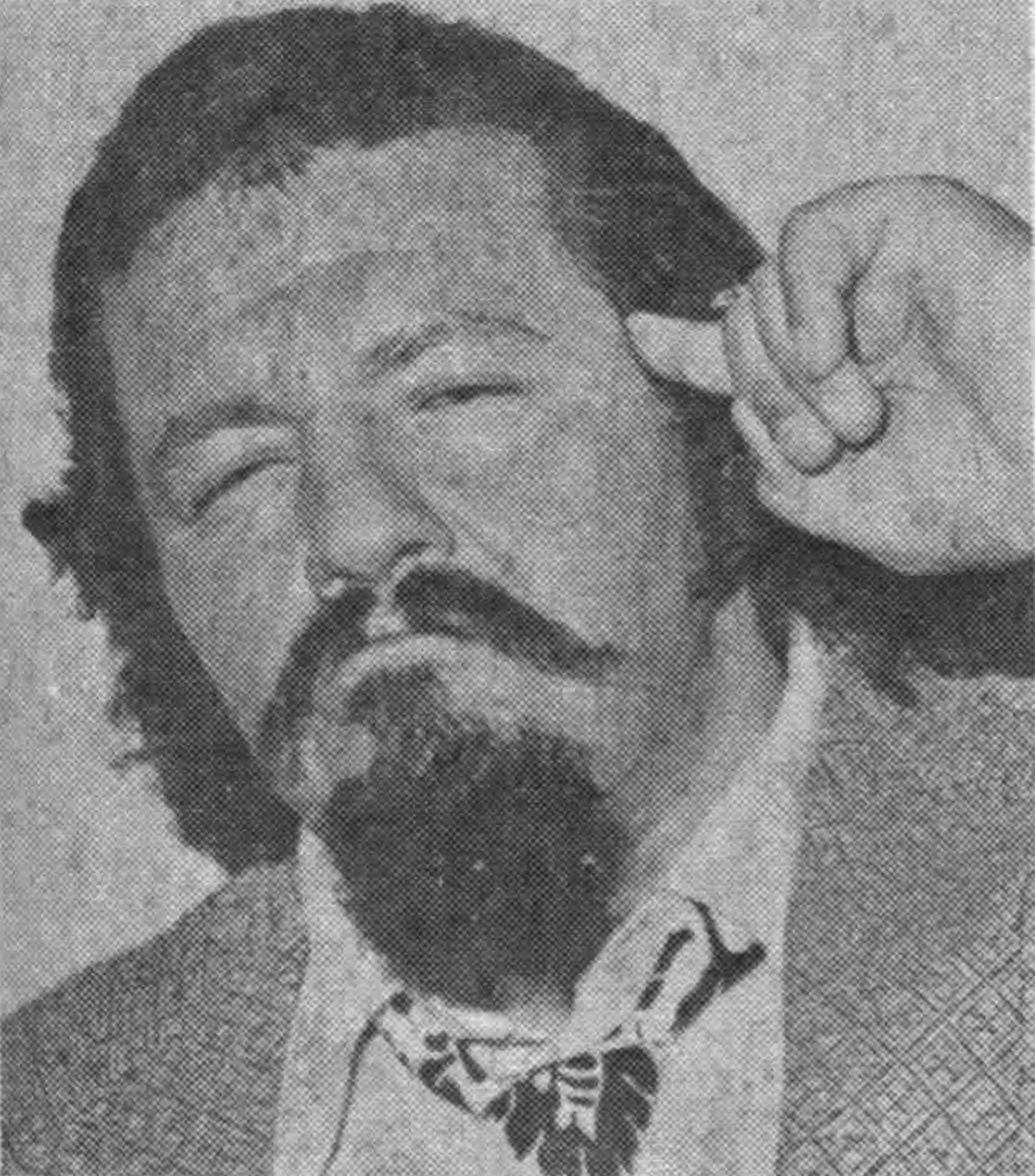
Albano in 1973

Another protege of Albano was "Iron" Mike McCord. In a memorable match in 1974 Chief Jay Strongbow applied his famous sleeper hold on McCord but Albano interfered in the match by smashing an arm cast over Strongbow's forehead, causing him to bleed badly. McCord was disqualified due to outside interference. Later Strongbow settled the score by challenging Albano to don the tights once again. And the stage was set in front of a sold-out crowd at Madison Square Garden, where he defeated Captain Lou Albano quite convincingly.

Albano then resumed his role as the mastermind trying to lead his latest bad guy protégé to the gold. For the remainder of the 1970s and into the mid-1980s, Albano's cadre of loyal henchmen were unable to re-secure the heavyweight championship, held by either Sammartino, Pedro Morales, Bob Backlund or Hulk Hogan. However, Albano guided singles wrestlers Don Muraco and Greg Valentine to the Intercontinental Heavyweight Championship. It was during his stewardship of the Valiant Brothers that Albano picked up his "Captain" nickname, as the act was promoted as "Captain Lou and the Valiants too." By the end of his career, Albano had managed over 50 different wrestlers who won two dozen championships.

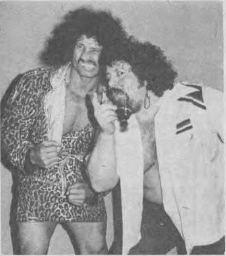
Albano (right) as manager for Jimmy Snuka in 1982

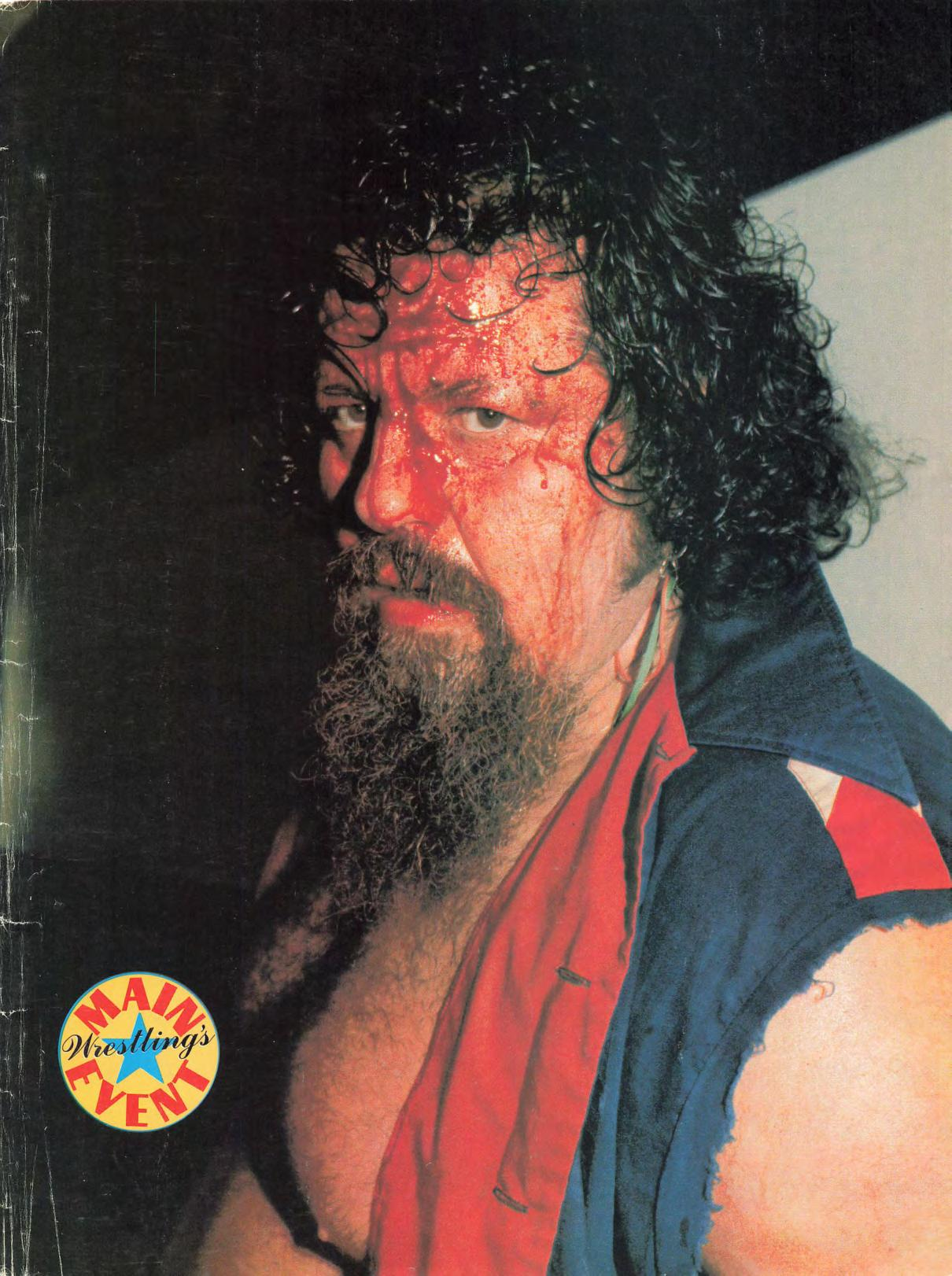
Albano after a match with Snuka on November 22, 1982

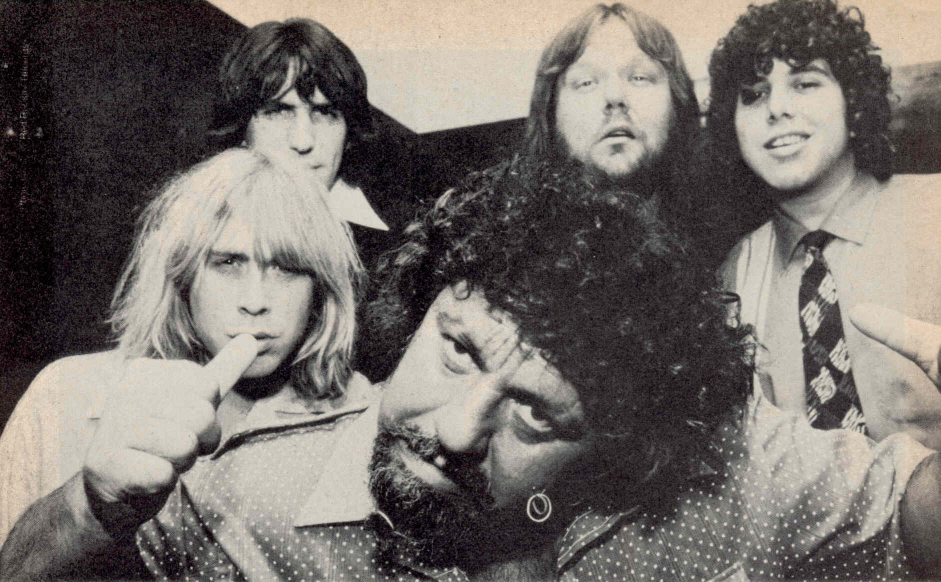
NRBQ (back) and Lou Albano (front)

In 1979, Jimmy Valiant introduced Albano to NRBQ on the latter's tour bus. Bandmember Terry Adams invited Albano to play the part of their manager and he agreed. In 1980, Albano taped a TV commercial for the band's album Tiddlywinks. At the time, it was considered "offensive" so it was broadcast only once in the Boston area. Audience members were taken aback when Albano was formally introduced into the music business by NRBQ at The Ritz in January 1981. NRBQ compiled all the recordings they'd done with Albano on their album Lou and the Q, which includes their 1981 single "Captain Lou" b/w "Boardin' House Pie"— on which Albano himself sings and rants.

In 1979–1980, Albano helped turn the villainous Intercontinental Champion Pat Patterson into a fan favorite by "purchasing" Patterson's contract from the Grand Wizard of Wrestling for $100,000 against Patterson's will. Albano's protégés, the Wild Samoans, attacked Patterson after he cut a promo insulting Albano.

In 1982, despite being managed by the villainous Albano, Jimmy Snuka was unexpectedly becoming a fan favorite due to his high-flying ring style. An interview segment revealed that Snuka had no legal contract with Albano, and thus was able to leave his manager. Shortly thereafter, a bloody beatdown by Albano, Freddie Blassie and Ray Stevens, helped transform Snuka into a sympathetic figure, and triggered the most successful period of his career.

In 1983, Albano met pop singer Cyndi Lauper on a plane flight from Puerto Rico. Her manager, David Wolff, suggested that the two collaborate on a project at some point in the future. In 1983, the opportunity came when Lauper's video for "Girls Just Want to Have Fun" needed an actor to play the singer's father, and Albano was suggested. Initially reluctant, he was convinced by his wife to agree, and Lauper and Albano thereafter formed a lifelong friendship. He appeared in several of her music videos and in June 1984, she appeared on Roddy Piper's "Piper's Pit" program to discuss the collaboration. Albano, in character, began denigrating Lauper and women in general and claimed to have written all her songs and been the only reason for her success. Lauper, in turn, assaulted Albano with her purse, and the two agreed to settle their differences in the ring. Albano and Lauper agreed to compete by proxy, each choosing a female wrestler to contend. Lauper chose Wendi Richter, while Albano chose The Fabulous Moolah. The match, scheduled for July 23, 1984, was dubbed The Brawl to End it All, and was broadcast live on MTV. During the match, Lauper interfered on Richter's behalf by hitting Moolah in the head with her purse, dubbed "The Loaded Purse of Doom". At the conclusion of the match, Richter had defeated Moolah for the WWF Women's Championship, which the WWF had promoted Moolah as having held for the previous 28 years.

In the meantime, Albano had become involved in several charities. His brother's brother-in-law had recently died of multiple sclerosis, and the experience led Albano to lend his time to raising awareness and funds to combat the disease, occasionally alongside Lauper. His increasingly public benevolence clashed with his in-ring persona, which violated the principles of kayfabe—maintaining the appearance of reality within professional wrestling—which were still strictly adhered to at the time. Near the end of 1984, Albano decided it was time, after 32 years as a heel, to turn face. He therefore arranged for Lauper to receive an in-ring award for her contributions to both wrestling and the fight against MS, for which he also came out and congratulated her. In the course of the ceremony, Roddy Piper and "Cowboy" Bob Orton came into the ring to sarcastically praise Albano before breaking Lauper's award, a gold record plaque, over his head. Lauper and her boyfriend-manager David Wolff were also attacked by Piper and Orton. The melee was broken up by Hulk Hogan who draped himself across Albano to protect him from further onslaught, signalling to the audience that the once notorious heel manager was suddenly now a fellow babyface. The altercation allowed Albano to now wrestle and manage as a crowd favorite. His last two (heel) singles protégés, Valentine and Ken Patera, were paired with Jimmy Hart and Bobby Heenan, respectively, after Albano's face turn. Although he continued his overblown, rambling interviews—one of the lead announcers for the WWF, Gorilla Monsoon, continued to refer to Albano as "The Fountain of Misinformation"—Albano was now leading fan favorites such as The U.S. Express, George Steele (a former wildman heel whom Albano aided after he was abandoned by his partners after losing a six-man tag match against Albano's men), The British Bulldogs, Hulk Hogan and André the Giant into battle. The U.S. Express and British Bulldogs became the first tag teams to win the WWF Tag Team Championships with Albano as a "face" manager. He managed the U.S. Express at WrestleMania I.

Albano left the WWF in late 1986 with one final match on an episode of Wrestling Challenge that aired on November 16, 1986, teaming with The British Bulldogs to defeat The Dream Team and Luscious Johnny Vailant. Albano would then make a one-time appearance on a "Piper's Pit" on an episode of Superstars of Wrestling in February 1987 to ask André the Giant to reconsider his recent alignment with Bobby Heenan.

=== Universal Wrestling Federation (1991) ===
Albano briefly worked in Herb Abrams' UWF promotion in 1991, where he hosted an interview segment.

=== Return to WWF and retirement (1994–1997) ===
Albano returned to the WWF in 1994 to manage the newly face-turned Headshrinkers, helping lead them to the WWF Tag Team Championship. He left in early 1995, making sporadic appearances as a guest from then on, but never again as a manager. He later retired from managing wrestlers in 1996. Wrestled his last match on June 7, 1997, losing to Judd the Stud for Pennsylvania Championship Wrestling in Wind Gap. Albano appeared briefly in the WWF during the September 22nd 1997 edition of Raw taking notes during a match with The Rock and Ahmed Johnson, implying a potential return to managing.

=== Legacy in the WWE ===
The events leading up to Albano's face turn proved to be pivotal in the history of the WWF. Hogan, Piper, and Orton began a feud at Lauper's award ceremony that culminated in The War to Settle the Score. The outcome of the War—Hogan winning by disqualification—was the impetus for the primary match at the first WrestleMania, in which Albano also participated, as a face manager. More importantly, the involvement of Lauper, a celebrity completely unrelated to wrestling, in the pro wrestling world was unprecedented. MTV's decision to broadcast the Brawl to End it All tremendously increased the WWF's public profile, especially in the coveted young adult demographic. This led directly to the 1980s professional wrestling boom. Wrestling Observer's Dave Meltzer wrote, "Without Albano, wrestling history would have been monumentally different because if you take Lauper's involvement out of the equation, the early losses on expanding nationally and buying so much television time were on the verge of putting the company under... Without her, there would have been no MTV special, no national media publicity, and it's highly unlikely without it that the first WrestleMania would have been a success. If you take Albano's participation out of the equation, there is a good chance the McMahon expansion would have hit an iceberg and died in early 1985 ... the attention garnered by the Rock & Wrestling Connection, stemming from that chance meeting on an airplane between Lauper and Albano less than two years earlier, led NBC to make the decision to air Saturday Night's Main Event several times per year in the Saturday Night Live time slot."

On July 23, 2026, Mattel released a 3 pack edition of Albano, Cyndi Lauper, and Rowdy Roddy Piper action figures on Mattel Creations.com, as well as part of the WWE's 2026 San Diego Comic-Con merchandise, which is part of Mattel Creations' "WWE Rock 'n' Wrestling" edition and pays tribute to the June 16, 1984 edition of Piper's Pit which occurred during Albano's heel run, and where he had a memorable heated confrontation with Lauper.

== Television and film ==
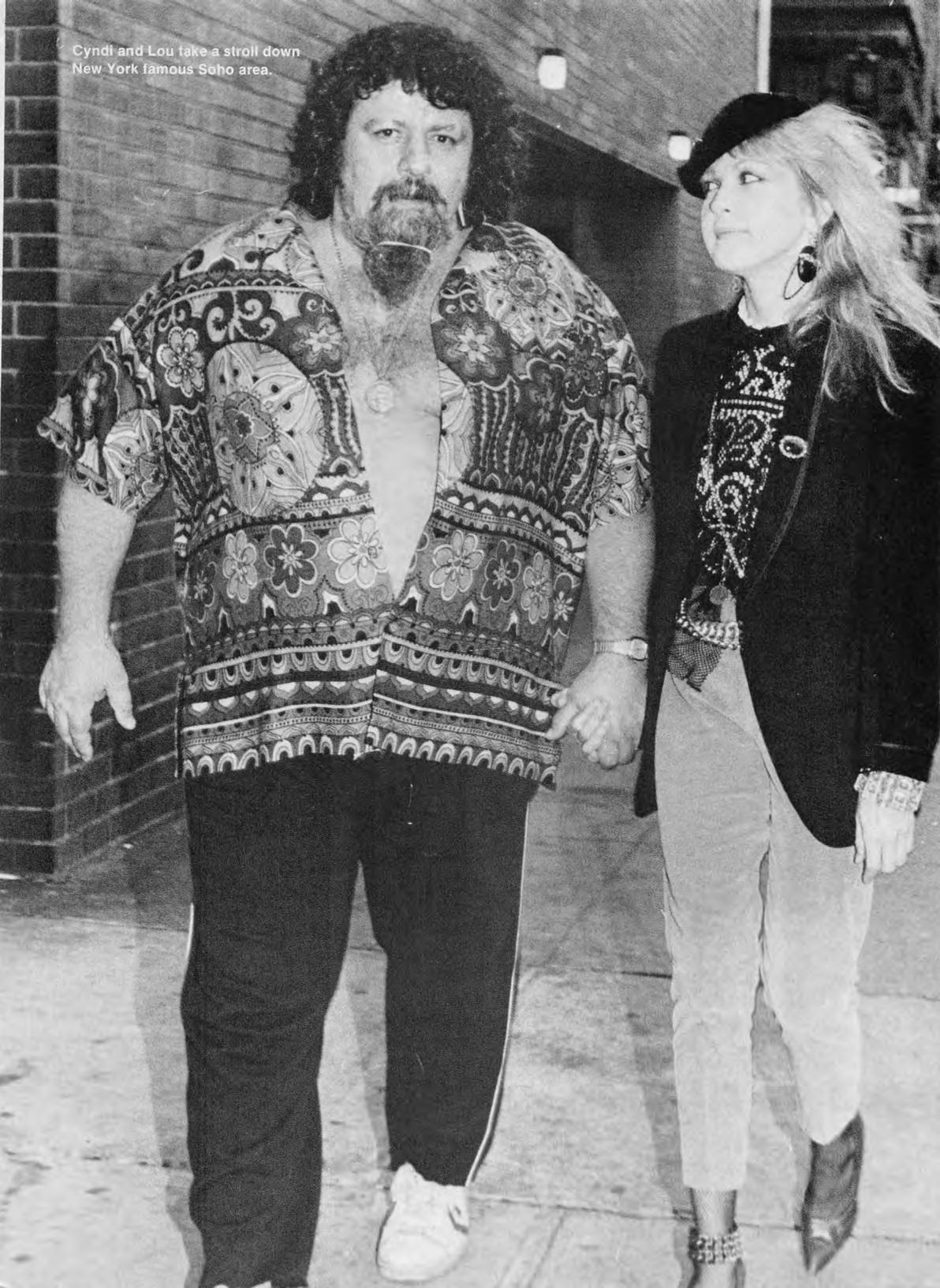
Albano (left) and Cyndi Lauper (right), circa 1983

Albano appeared in the 1986 film Wise Guys, starring Danny DeVito. He played the role of Mario, Nintendo's mascot, in both the live-action and animated segments of The Super Mario Bros. Super Show!, a TV series based on the Super Mario Bros. game series. He also had roles in the TV series 227, Hey Dude, and Miami Vice, the 1992 film Stay Tuned, and was a recurring guest on the game show Hollywood Squares. Albano played a villainous caricature of himself named "Captain Lou Morano" in the 1987 movie Body Slam, starring Dirk Benedict and Roddy Piper. The film also included cameo appearances by wrestlers Ric Flair, Freddie Blassie, and Bruno Sammartino. Albano played the role of the father in Cyndi Lauper's music videos for "Girls Just Want to Have Fun", "The Goonies 'R' Good Enough" and "She Bop", as well as a cook in the video for her song "Time After Time".

== Personal life ==
In 1953, Albano married his high school sweetheart, Geraldine Tango. The marriage lasted 56 years, until his death. Albano has been noted by several others for his faithfulness to his wife, a rare characteristic in the on-the-road world of 1970s and 1980s professional wrestling. Albano released his autobiography, Often Imitated, Never Duplicated, on July 20, 2008, through his website. The book includes a foreword by Cyndi Lauper. The other Albano siblings are Vincent, George, Eleanor, and Carl, all of whom became teachers. Albano's brother, Carl, taught health for 32 years at Ridgewood High School in Ridgewood, New Jersey, and was head of the Ridgewood High health department from 1974 until 2001. Carl's students have noted that he used his brother Lou as an example of the difference between crazy and unique. George served as the principal of Lincoln Elementary School in Mount Vernon, New York, and often brought Lou in to delight the school's students during their lunch hour. Vincent was an art teacher and lived part-time in a lake house in Connecticut. Eleanor was a music teacher for preschool students in Connecticut.

Albano's son, Carl Albano, served as a member of the Putnam County Legislature from 2011 until his departure due to term limits on December 31, 2022. While serving in the Putnam County Legislature, Albano's son Carl earned the title of "Dean of Putnam Legislature." Albano's nephew Carl (who is the son of his brother George) has also served as a school superintendent in numerous school districts, and currently serves as superintendent of the Palisades Park School District.

During the 1990s, Albano shed 150 pounds (68kg) following a health scare. In May 2005, Albano suffered a heart attack, but later recovered. Albano was sent home from the hospital and again began watching his health. The song "Captain Lou" by Kimya Dawson is dedicated to him (not to be confused with the 1981 NRBQ song of the same name).

== Death ==
Albano died on October 14, 2009, in Westchester County, New York, of a heart attack while residing in hospice care. He was 76 years old. Albano was buried at Rose Hill Memorial Park in Putnam Valley, New York.

== Filmography ==
=== Film ===
Year	Title	Role	Notes
1980	Below the Belt	Wrestler	
1986	Wise Guys	Frank 'The Fixer' Acavano	
1986	Body Slam	Captain Lou Murano	
1991	Complex World	Boris Lee	
1992	Stay Tuned	Ring Announcer	
2000	The Boys Behind the Desk	—N/a	
2001	Mafioso: The Father, the Son	Doc	
2003	The Undertaker's Dozen	Lou Costanza	
2010	Hot Ice, No-one Is Safe	Frankie the Hat	

=== Television ===
Year	Title	Role	Notes
1963	Jackie Gleason: American Scene Magazine	Sandpaper Sam Staccato	1 episode
1986	227	Gus	Episode: "We the People"
1986	Hulk Hogan's Rock 'n' Wrestling	Captain Lou Albano	Episode: "Ballet Buffoons/Battle of the Bands"
1987	Miami Vice	Henchman #1	Episode: "By Hooker by Crook"
1989	The Super Mario Bros. Super Show!	Mario, Mama Mario, Marianne, Mario Joe, Himself	65 episodes
1990	Hey Dude	Captain Lou	Episode: "Killer Ernst"
1992	Ghostwriter	Cabbie	Episode: "Who Burned Mr. Brinker's Store?: Part 2"

=== Video games ===
Year	Title	Role	Notes
2004	Showdown: Legends of Wrestling	Himself (Captain Lou Albano)	
2022	WWE Champions	Himself (Captain Lou Albano)	Posthumous appearance
2025	WWE 2K25	Manager (Captain Lou Albano)	
2026	WWE 2K26	Manager (Captain Lou Albano)	

=== Music videos ===
Year	Title	Role
1983	"Girls Just Wanna Have Fun"	Dad
1984	"Time After Time"	Cook
1984	"She Bop"	Guard
1985	"The Goonies 'R' Good Enough"	Cyndi's Father

== Championships and accomplishments ==
- Cauliflower Alley Club
  - Other honoree (1995)
- Fred Kohler Enterprises
  - Midwest Tag Team Championship (1 time) – with Tony Altomare
- National Italian American Sports Hall of Fame
  - Class of 2024
- New England Wrestling Alliance
  - NEWA Hall of Fame (Class of 2011)
- Pro Wrestling Illustrated
  - Manager of the Year (1974, 1981, 1986)
  - Editors' Award (1994)
- Professional Wrestling Hall of Fame and Museum
  - Class of 2009
- World Wide Wrestling Federation/World Wrestling Federation
  - WWWF United States Tag Team Championship (1 time) – with Tony Altomare
  - WWF Hall of Fame (Class of 1996)
- Wrestling Observer Newsletter
  - Best on Interviews (1981) tied with Roddy Piper
  - Worst Worked Match of the Year (1985) vs. Freddie Blassie at Nassau Veterans Memorial Coliseum
  - Wrestling Observer Newsletter Hall of Fame (Class of 2012)

== Notes ==
Preceded by Peter Cullen; 1983–1985; Saturday Supercade	Voice of Mario; 1989–1990; The Super Mario Bros. Super Show!	Succeeded by Walker Boone; 1990–1992; The Adventures of Super Mario Bros. 3 & Captain N: The Game Master & Super Mario World
