= The War to Settle the Score =

1985 World Wrestling Federation event

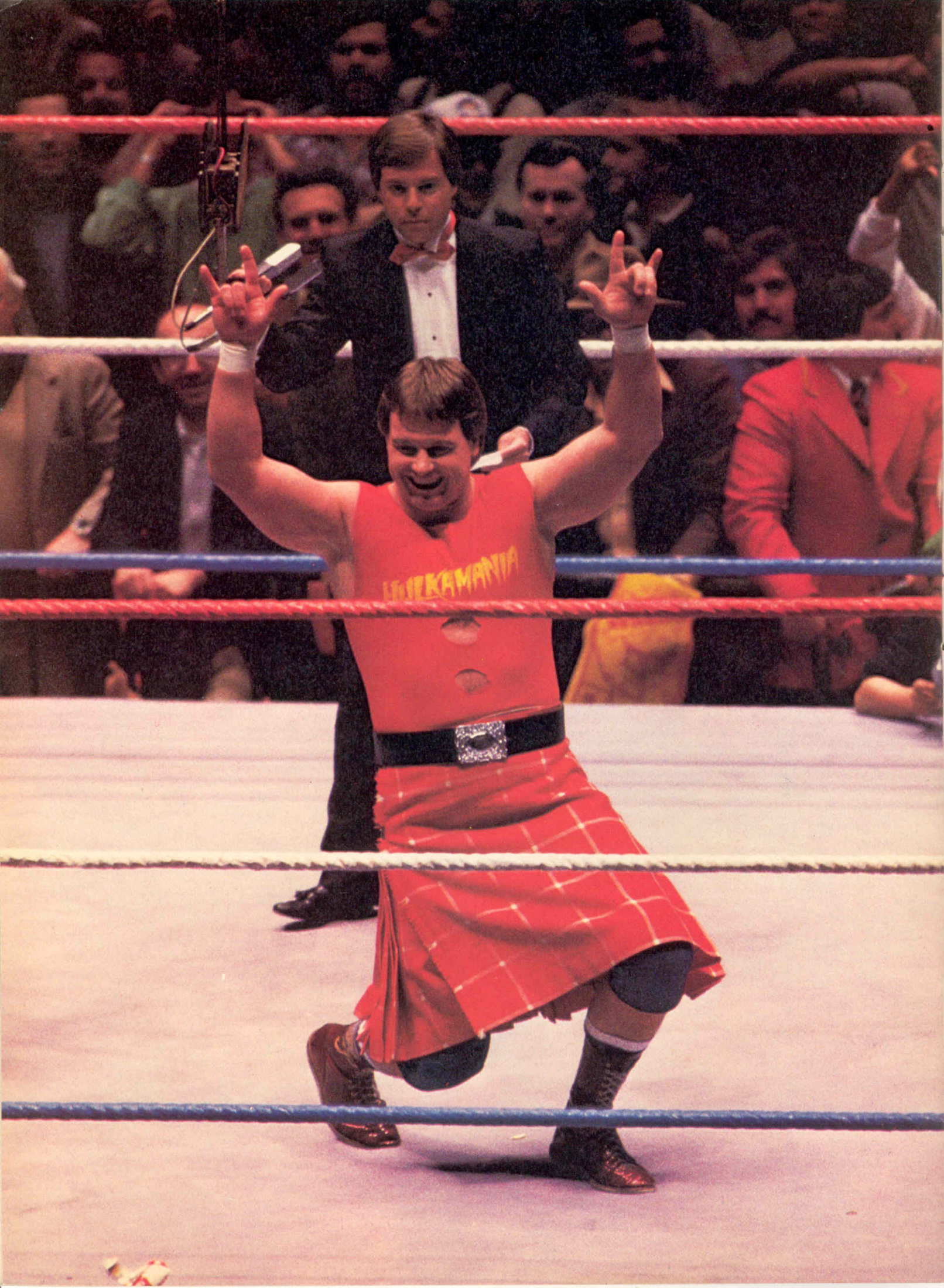
- Roddy Piper mocking the crowd by wearing a Hulkamania t-shirt as he is introduced by guest ring announcer Bob Costas
- Promotion: World Wrestling Federation
- Date: February 18, 1985
- City: New York, New York
- Venue: Madison Square Garden
- Attendance: 22,000

Event chronology
← Previous; The Brawl to End It All	Next → WrestleMania

Television special chronology
← Previous; The Brawl to End It All	Next → Saturday Night's Main Event I

The War to Settle the Score (later known as prequel to the WrestleMania and the sequel of the first flagship event The Brawl to End It All) was a professional wrestling television special produced by the World Wrestling Federation (WWF). It took place at Madison Square Garden in New York, New York on February 18, 1985. The event served as the second flagship event for the WWF. The main event featured Hulk Hogan defending the WWF World Heavyweight Championship against "Rowdy" Roddy Piper. Hogan retained the title after Piper got disqualified in the only match of the event that was shown on MTV.

On September 5, 2019, the entire show was added to the WWE Network in their "Hidden Gems" section; however, the next day it was removed.

== Background ==
One of the feuds at the event dated back to 1983, when Lou Albano, a wrestling manager, appeared in Cyndi Lauper's music video for "Girls Just Want to Have Fun" as Lauper's father. The WWF capitalized on his appearance by creating a storyline feud between the two, in which Albano was portrayed as a sexist. As Lauper was too busy to make extensive appearances at WWF events, another storyline was developed between Albano and David Wolff, Lauper's manager. Albano, hyping his association with the band NRBQ, portrayed himself as an up-and-coming star in music management, with Wolff coming along to steal his thunder. This created the background for the first WWF special on MTV, The Brawl to End It All. Albano managed WWF Women's Champion The Fabulous Moolah, while Lauper managed challenger Wendi Richter. Richter won the match, and Albano and Lauper reconciled their differences. Moolah, however, remained upset and challenged Richter to a match on behalf of Leilani Kai, another women's wrestler.

Lauper's involvement with the WWF also helped set up the other major feud at The War to Settle the Score. On December 28, 1984, she presented Albano with an award. Roddy Piper, who was angered by the Rock 'n' Wrestling Connection that saw the WWF and MTV use cross-promotion to attract viewers, attacked Lauper and Albano; Hogan's defense of Lauper led to a match for Hogan's WWF World Heavyweight Championship.

== Event ==
Other on-screen personnel
Role:	Name:
Commentator	Gorilla Monsoon
Commentator	Gene Okerlund
Interviewer	Gene Okerlund
Ring announcer	Howard Finkel
Ring announcer	Bob Costas (Main Event)

As with The Brawl to End it All, only the final match on the card was televised on MTV. The undercard featured two title matches, however. The first featured Richter, accompanied by Lauper, defending her title against Kai, who was managed by Moolah. Kai defeated Richter to win the title belt. In the following match, Barry Windham and Mike Rotundo defeated The Spoiler and The Assassin to retain the WWF Tag Team Championship.

In the main event match, Hulk Hogan defeated Roddy Piper by disqualification to defend the WWF World Heavyweight Championship. Paul Orndorff and Bob Orton, Jr. interfered in the match on Piper's behalf. Hogan's friend Mr. T was sitting at ringside; at the end of the match, he and Lauper entered the ring after the match but were attacked by Piper and his friends. During the brawl, Piper kicked Lauper in the head.

== Aftermath ==
The fight at the end of the Hogan vs. Piper match set up the main event for the first WrestleMania event promoted by the WWF, which took place on March 31, 1985. Hogan and Mr. T faced the team of Roddy Piper and Paul Orndorff. Orton attempted to interfere on his friends' behalf but hit Orndorff instead. As a result, Hogan pinned Orndorff to win the match for his team. The feud between Mr. T and Piper remained unresolved, and they faced each other the following year at WrestleMania 2 in a boxing match, which Mr. T won by disqualification.

Richter and Kai also faced each other at the first WrestleMania. Richter defeated Kai to regain the WWF Women's Championship. Richter would lose the title back to The Fabulous Moolah in November of 1985 in the "Original Screwjob" where Richter's shoulders were counted for a pin though she lifted them up at the one count (the "screwjob" was due to Richter and the WWF failing to reach a contract agreement). She left the WWF immediately after that and did not return for over two decades.

Rick McGraw was shown on TV being attacked violently by Roddy Piper on an episode of WWF Championship Wrestling in October of 1985 (aired in November 1985), McGraw died on November 1, 1985, from a heart attack and some fans erroneously thought Piper had caused his death because the segment aired after his death. David Sammartino left the WWF after a match where he controversially submitted to jobber Ron Shaw in November 1985.

In an unexpected consequence, pop-artist Andy Warhol, a long-time wrestling fan who was in attendance, accidentally walked into a room at the end of the event that had been set up for an interview with Hogan, Cyndi Lauper, Mr T and Captain Lou Albano. As this was being broadcast live to end the show, Warhol had to improvise a short promo praising the Rock 'n' Wrestling Connection.

== Results ==
No.	Results	Stipulations	Times
1^{D}	Moondog Spot vs. Rick McGraw ended in a draw	Singles match	15:00
2^{D}	Johnny Rodz defeated Jose Louis Rivera	Singles match	11:14
3^{D}	Hillbilly Jim defeated Rene Goulet	Singles match	7:29
4^{D}	Leilani Kai defeated Wendi Richter (c)	Singles match for the WWF Women's Championship	11:49
5^{D}	David Sammartino defeated Moondog Rex	Singles match	12:27
6^{D}	Nikolai Volkoff defeated Swede Hanson	Singles match	5:48
7^{D}	Jimmy Snuka defeated Bob Orton	Singles match	9:59
8^{D}	Paul Orndorff defeated Tony Atlas	Singles match	6:08
9^{D}	The U.S. Express (Barry Windham and Mike Rotunda) (c) defeated The Spoiler and The Assassin	Tag Team match for the WWF Tag Team Championship	0:36
10^{D}	Don Muraco defeated Salvatore Bellomo	Singles match	2:41
11	Hulk Hogan (c) defeated Roddy Piper by disqualification	Singles match for the WWF World Heavyweight Championship	8:40
(c) / – the champion(s) heading into the match; D / – this was a dark match
