= The Brawl to End It All =

1984 World Wrestling Federation event

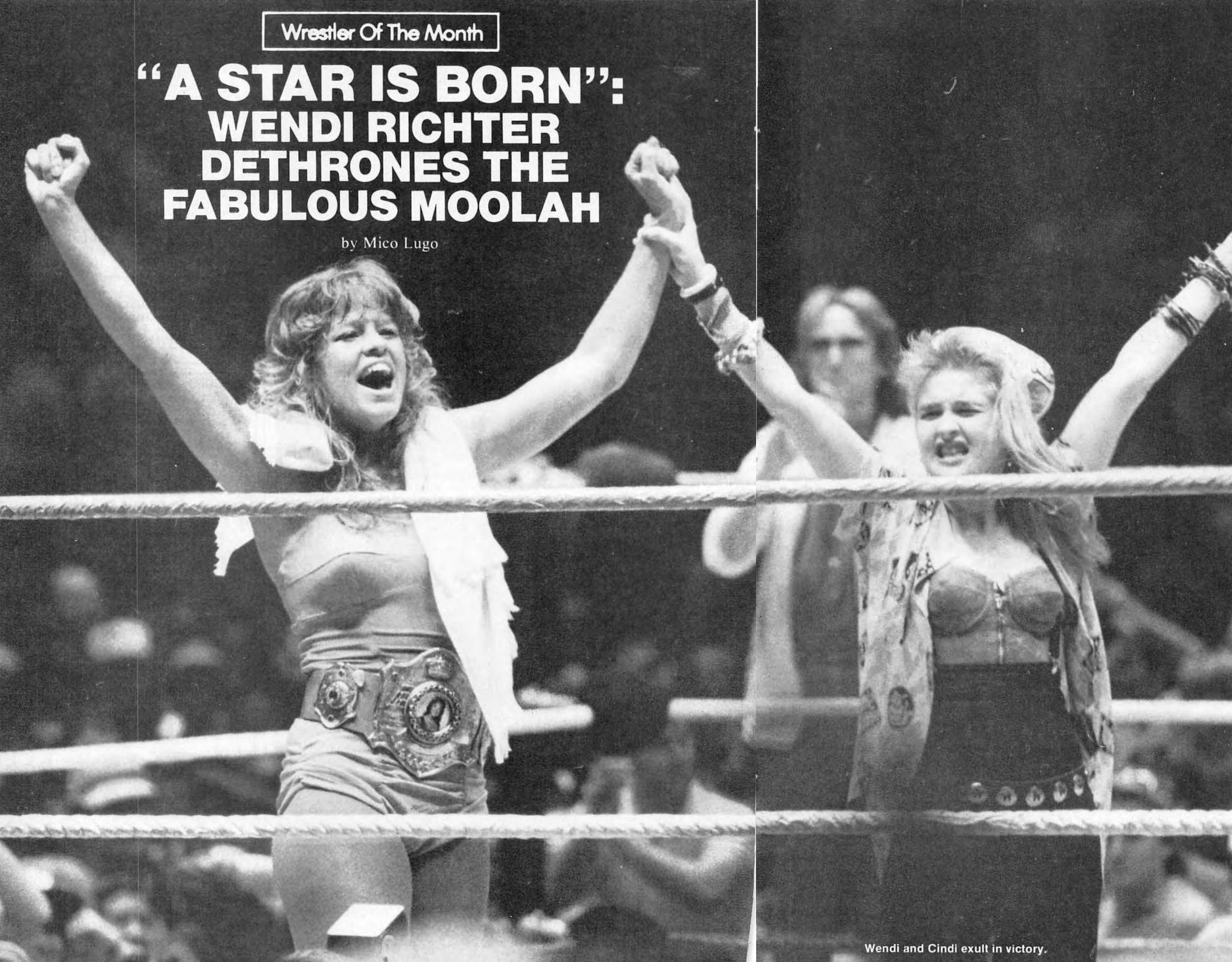
- Wendy Richter (left) won the WWF Women's Championship at The Brawl to End It All, accompanied by Cyndi Lauper (right)
- Promotion: World Wrestling Federation
- Date: July 23, 1984
- City: New York, New York, United States
- Venue: Madison Square Garden
- Attendance: 23,416

Event chronology
← Previous; Showdown at Shea	Next → The War to Settle the Score

The Brawl to End It All (later known as prequel to the WrestleMania) was a professional wrestling television special produced by the World Wrestling Federation (WWF) and broadcast live on MTV. It took place at Madison Square Garden in New York, New York in the United States on July 23, 1984. The show was a major event in the Rock 'n' Wrestling Connection in the mid-1980s WWF, and was the original flagship event for the WWF and began a storyline that ultimately culminated in the first WrestleMania. The main event featured The Fabulous Moolah defending the WWF Women's Championship against Wendi Richter. Richter pinned Moolah to win the Women's Championship. It was the only match of the event that was shown on national television (on MTV). In the main event from closed-circuit television Hulk Hogan pinned Greg Valentine to retain the WWF World Heavyweight Championship.

The event was recorded and shown on the Madison Square Garden Network. On September 5, 2019 the entire show was added to the WWE Network in their "Hidden Gems" section. It was removed the next day.

== Background ==
Captain Lou Albano, a wrestling manager, appeared in Cyndi Lauper's 1983 music video for "Girls Just Want to Have Fun". This led to a scripted wrestling storyline in which Albano's sexism angered Lauper. Albano and Lauper appeared on WWF television programs to voice their anger at each other. Eventually, it was decided that the feud would be settled in a wrestling match. Lauper chose WWF female wrestler Wendi Richter to represent her, while Albano managed The Fabulous Moolah, who had held the WWF Women's Championship for almost 28 years.

== Event ==
Other on-screen personnel
Role:	Name:
Commentator	Gorilla Monsoon
Commentator	Gene Okerlund
Interviewer	Gene Okerlund
Ring announcer	Howard Finkel

The opening bout was a singles match between Ron Shaw and Sika. Sika won the match by pinfall following a diving headbutt. This was a dark match that did not air on the television broadcast.

The second bout was a singles match between The Iron Sheik and Tony Garea. The Iron Sheik defeated Garea by pinfall following a backdrop driver. This was a dark match that did not air on the television broadcast.

The third bout was a singles match in which WWF Intercontinental Champion Tito Santana defended his title against "Cowboy" Bob Orton. The match ended in a time-limit draw after 20 minutes. This was a dark match that did not air on the television broadcast.

The fourth bout was a singles match between Bob Backlund and Butcher Vachon. Backlund defeated Vachon via submission using the crossface chickenwing. This was a dark match that did not air on the television broadcast.

The fifth bout was a singles match in which WWF World Martial Arts Heavyweight Champion Antonio Inoki defended his title against Charlie Fulton. Inoki defeated Fulton by pinfall following a enzuigiri. This was a dark match that did not air on the television broadcast.

The sixth bout was a tag team match in which WWF Tag Team Champions the North-South Connection (Adrian Adonis and Dick Murdoch) defended their titles against the Cobra Corps (Sgt. Slaughter and his protégé, Pvt. Terry Daniels). The North-South Connection won the match by pinning Daniels following a backbreaker hold, diving elbow drop combination. This was a dark match that did not air on the television broadcast.

The seventh bout was a singles match in which WWF Women's Champion The Fabulous Moolah defended her title against Wendi Richter. Going into the match, Moolah was billed as having been champion for 26 years. Moolah was aged 60, while Richter (who Moolah had trained) was 22. Moolah was accompanied to the ring by Captain Lou Albano, while Richter was accompanied by the singer Cyndi Lauper and her manager David Wolff). Richter won the title by pinning Moolah after lifting her shoulder on a German suplex. This match aired on MTV.

The eighth bout was a singles match between Chief Jay Strongbow and "Mr. Wonderful" Paul Orndorff. Orndorff won the match by pinfall following a clothesline. This was a dark match that did not air on the television broadcast.

The ninth bout was a singles match between Afa and Rene Goulet. Afa won the match by pinfall following a Samoan drop. This was a dark match that did not air on the television broadcast.

The tenth bout was a 20-man battle royal between Adrian Adonis, Afa, Antonio Inoki, Butcher Vachon, Charlie Fulton, Chief Jay Strongbow, "Cowboy" Bob Orton, Dick Murdoch, The Iron Sheik, Jose Luis Rivera, Paul Orndorff, Pvt. Terry Daniels, Rene Goulet, Ron Shaw, Samu, Sgt. Slaughter, Sika, Steve Lombardi, Tito Santana, and Tony Garea. Inoki won the battle royal, lastly eliminating Goulet. This was a dark match that did not air on the television broadcast.

The main event and eleventh bout was a singles match in which WWF World Heavyweight Champion Hulk Hogan defended his title against Greg Valentine. Hogan defeated Valentine by pinfall following a leg drop. This match aired on closed-circuit television.

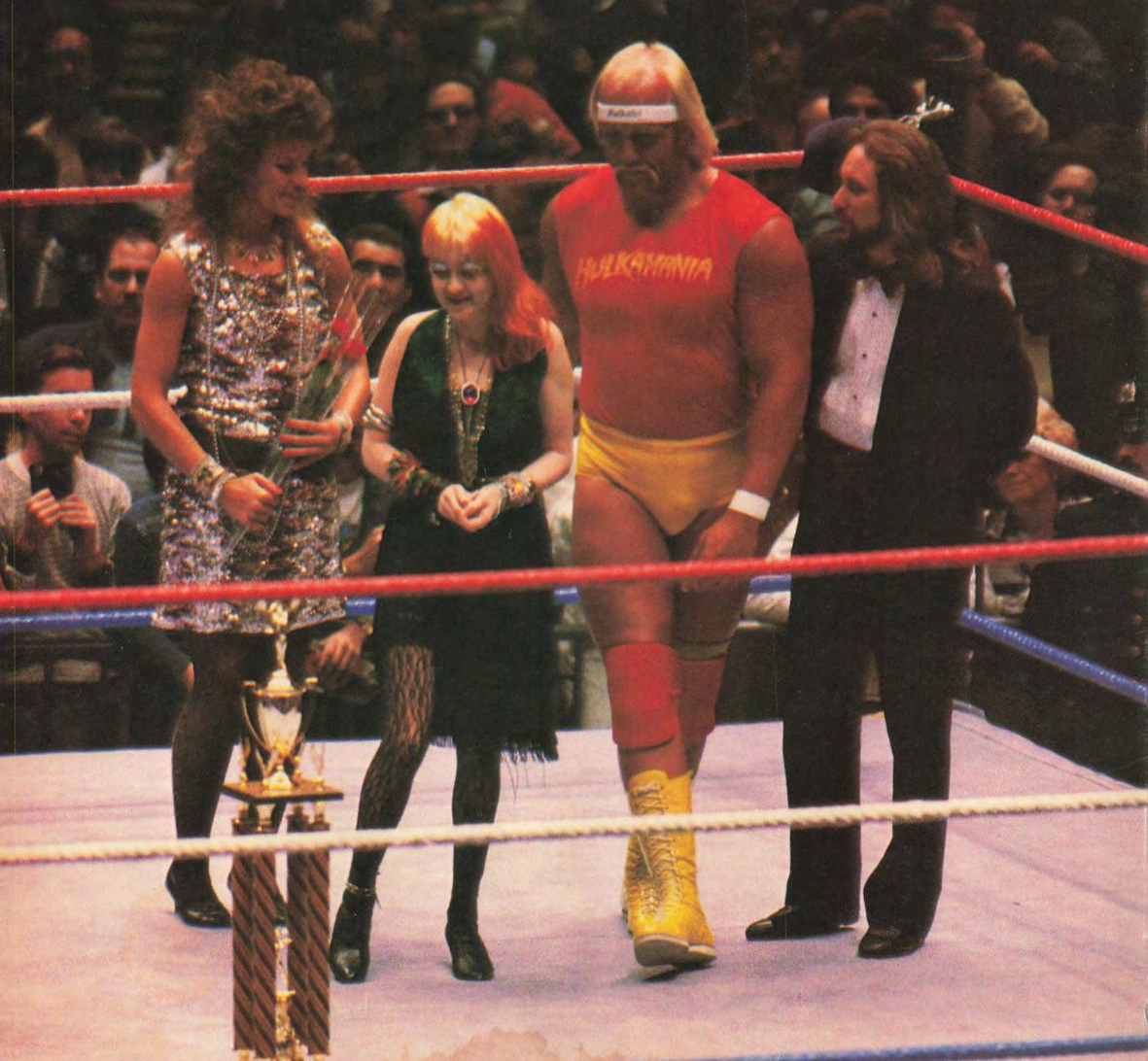
Wendy Richter, Cyndi Lauper, Hulk Hogan, and David Wolff, pictured in May 1985

== Reception ==
The Brawl to End It All was "a tremendous success". The event had a 9.0 Nielsen rating, which made it the most-watched program in the history of MTV to that point.

== Aftermath ==
On February 18, 1985, the WWF promoted another wrestling event, The War to Settle the Score, on MTV. Lauper was involved again, as she intervened in the main event match that saw Hulk Hogan defend his WWF World Heavyweight Championship against Roddy Piper. Another featured match on the card saw The Fabulous Moolah avenge her loss to Richter by managing Leilani Kai to a victory over Richter for the WWF Women's Championship. The events in War to Settle the Score led directly to the first WrestleMania.

The event took place nine days after Black Saturday and highlights from the event were shown on WWF World Championship Wrestling on WTBS. Bob Backlund was on his way out of WWF after his five-year run as WWF Heavyweight Champion and moved to the NWA-AWA promotion Pro Wrestling USA; Backlund would not return to the WWF until 1992. In January 1985 the North-South Connection of Adrian Adonis and Dick Murdoch would lose their WWF World Tag Team titles to Barry Windham and Mike Rotundo (the US Express). Tito Santana would lose his Intercontinental title to Greg Valentine on an episode of Maple Leaf Wrestling in October 1984.

Antonio Inoki would retain the WWF World Martial Arts Championship (in 1985 the title became the property of New Japan Pro Wrestling after the WWF and NJPW ended their working arrangement) until losing it to Shota Chochishvili in April 1989, ending Inoki's 11-year run as champion. Inoki regained the title a month later and then NJPW retired the title in favor of the "Greatest 18 Championship".

On July 23, 2026, Mattel released a three pack Mattel Creations WWE "Rock 'n' Wrestling" set of action figures of Lauper, Albano and Rowdy Roddy Piper which pays tribute to the June 16, 1984 edition of Piper's Pit which led to The Brawl to End it All.

== Results ==
No.	Results	Stipulations	Times
1^{D}	Sika defeated Ron Shaw by pinfall	Singles match	5:03
2^{D}	The Iron Sheik defeated Tony Garea by pinfall	Singles match	5:56
3^{D}	Tito Santana (c) vs. "Cowboy" Bob Orton ended in a draw	Singles match for the WWF Intercontinental Championship	20:00
4^{D}	Bob Backlund defeated Butcher Vachon via submission	Singles match	7:24
5^{D}	Antonio Inoki defeated Charlie Fulton by pinfall	Singles match	3:50
6^{D}	The North-South Connection (Adrian Adonis and Dick Murdoch) (c) defeated the Cobra Corps (Pvt. Terry Daniels and Sgt. Slaughter) by pinfall	Tag team match for the WWF Tag Team Championship	17:16
7	Wendi Richter (with Cyndi Lauper and David Wolff) defeated The Fabulous Moolah (c) (with Captain Lou Albano) by pinfall	Singles match for the WWF Women's Championship	11:20
8^{D}	"Mr. Wonderful" Paul Orndorff defeated Chief Jay Strongbow by pinfall	Singles match	6:05
9^{D}	Afa defeated Rene Goulet by pinfall	Singles match	3:43
10^{D}	Antonio Inoki won by last eliminating Rene Goulet	20-man battle royal	13:23
11	Hulk Hogan (c) defeated Greg Valentine (with Captain Lou Albano) via pinfall	Singles match for the WWF World Heavyweight Championship	10:24
(c) / – the champion(s) heading into the match; D / – this was a dark match
