= 1980s professional wrestling boom =

Era of professional wrestling

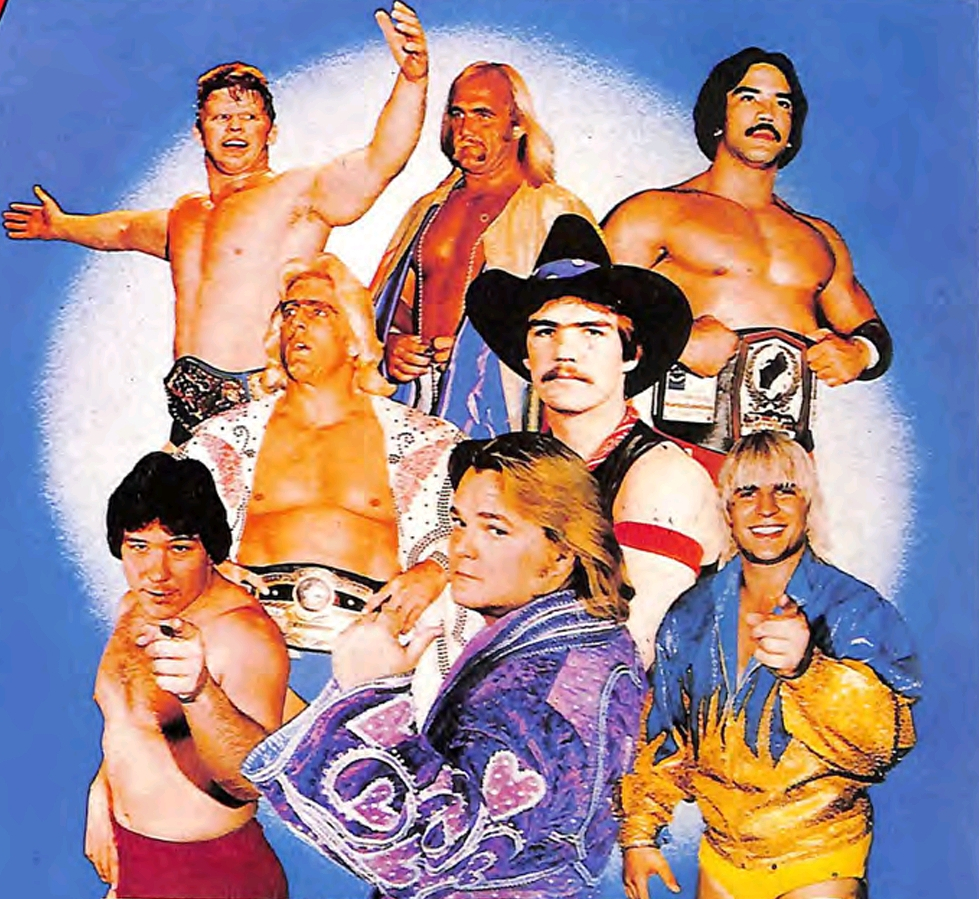
Photocollage of 1980s wrestling stars, from a photo album sold by TV Sports. Top to bottom and left to right: Bob Backlund, Hulk Hogan, Ricky Steamboat, Ric Flair, Barry Windham, Ted DiBiase, Greg Valentine and Tommy Rich.

The 1980s professional wrestling boom, more commonly referred to as the Golden Era or the Rock 'n' Wrestling Era, was a surge in the popularity of professional wrestling in the United States and elsewhere throughout the 1980s. The expansion of cable television and pay-per-view, coupled with the efforts of promoters such as Vince McMahon, saw wrestling shift from a system controlled by numerous regional companies to one dominated by two nationwide companies: McMahon's World Wrestling Federation (WWF, now WWE) and Ted Turner's World Championship Wrestling (WCW). The decade also saw a considerable decline in the power of the National Wrestling Alliance (NWA), which had until then dominated the wrestling landscape, and in the efforts to sustain belief in the kayfabe of wrestling.

== History ==
In the early 1980s, professional wrestling in the United States consisted mainly of three competing organizations or promotions: the World Wrestling Federation in the Northeast, the American Wrestling Association (AWA) in the Midwest, and the National Wrestling Alliance (NWA), which consisted of various wrestling promotions which operated within a territorial system around the country.

=== National Wrestling Alliance ===
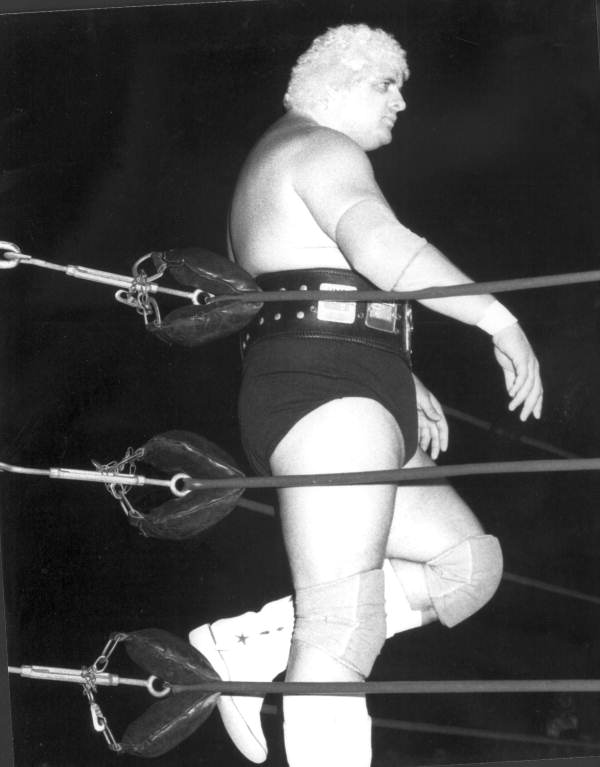
Dusty Rhodes was a top star in Championship Wrestling from Florida and other NWA affiliates

Multiple NWA territories were very successful in the 1970s and continued that success in the early 1980s. WTBS in Atlanta, Georgia, became a cable television superstation based on broadcasting Georgia Championship Wrestling (GCW), with both Mr. Wrestling II and Tommy Rich being the top headliners in the territory. Ric Flair rose to prominence in Mid Atlantic Wrestling, while Dusty Rhodes was the fan favorite in Championship Wrestling from Florida (CWF). Mid-South Wrestling had the first significant African-American champion babyface, Junkyard Dog.

Meanwhile, the NWA's affiliate in Memphis, Tennessee, the Continental Wrestling Association (CWA), had Jerry Lawler, who rose to national prominence thanks to his "feud" with Andy Kaufman. After Lawler piledrove the comedian during a 1982 match in Memphis, the two got into an altercation on NBC's Late Night with David Letterman, in which Lawler slapped Kaufman on-air and Kaufman responded by shouting profanities and throwing coffee at Lawler before storming out of the studio. The act, later revealed to be staged, is largely credited with giving rise to modern-day professional wrestling.

=== American Wrestling Association ===
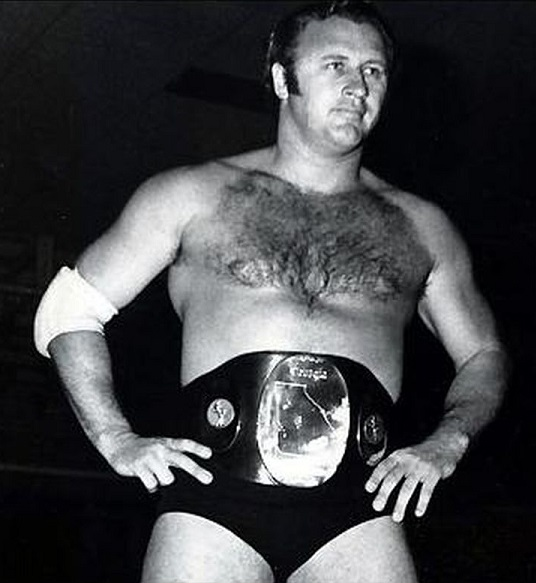
Four-time AWA World Heavyweight Champion Nick Bockwinkel

At the beginning of the 1980s, the AWA had the largest television presence, with distribution of their weekly broadcast in Chicago, Denver, Green Bay, Las Vegas, Milwaukee, Minneapolis, Omaha, Phoenix, Salt Lake City, San Francisco and Winnipeg. The AWA expanded into the top-ten media market of the San Francisco Bay Area after Roy Shire ran his final battle royal at the Cow Palace on January 24, 1981, demonstrating that the AWA was positioned to prosper as other promotions failed.

The AWA had the talent that would ultimately lead Vince McMahon's WWF to pre-eminence in professional wrestling. Gene Okerlund and Bobby Heenan were AWA's major on-air talent. Hulk Hogan became the top babyface after Verne Gagne retired from full-time wrestling in 1981 and Nick Bockwinkel became the AWA World Heavyweight Champion. Hogan faced Bockwinkel on April 18, 1982, and on April 24, 1983, with both matches being decided with "dusty finishes" where Hogan pinned Bockwinkel for a three count but was then stripped of the title. Hogan said Gagne offered him the championship on the latter occasion in exchange for his merchandising rights and money from touring with other promotions, which would show that Gagne understood wrestling was becoming a bigger business in the 1980s; however, Hogan refused. Gagne's failure to keep his fortunate position is a significant factor in the history of professional wrestling.

=== World Class Championship Wrestling ===
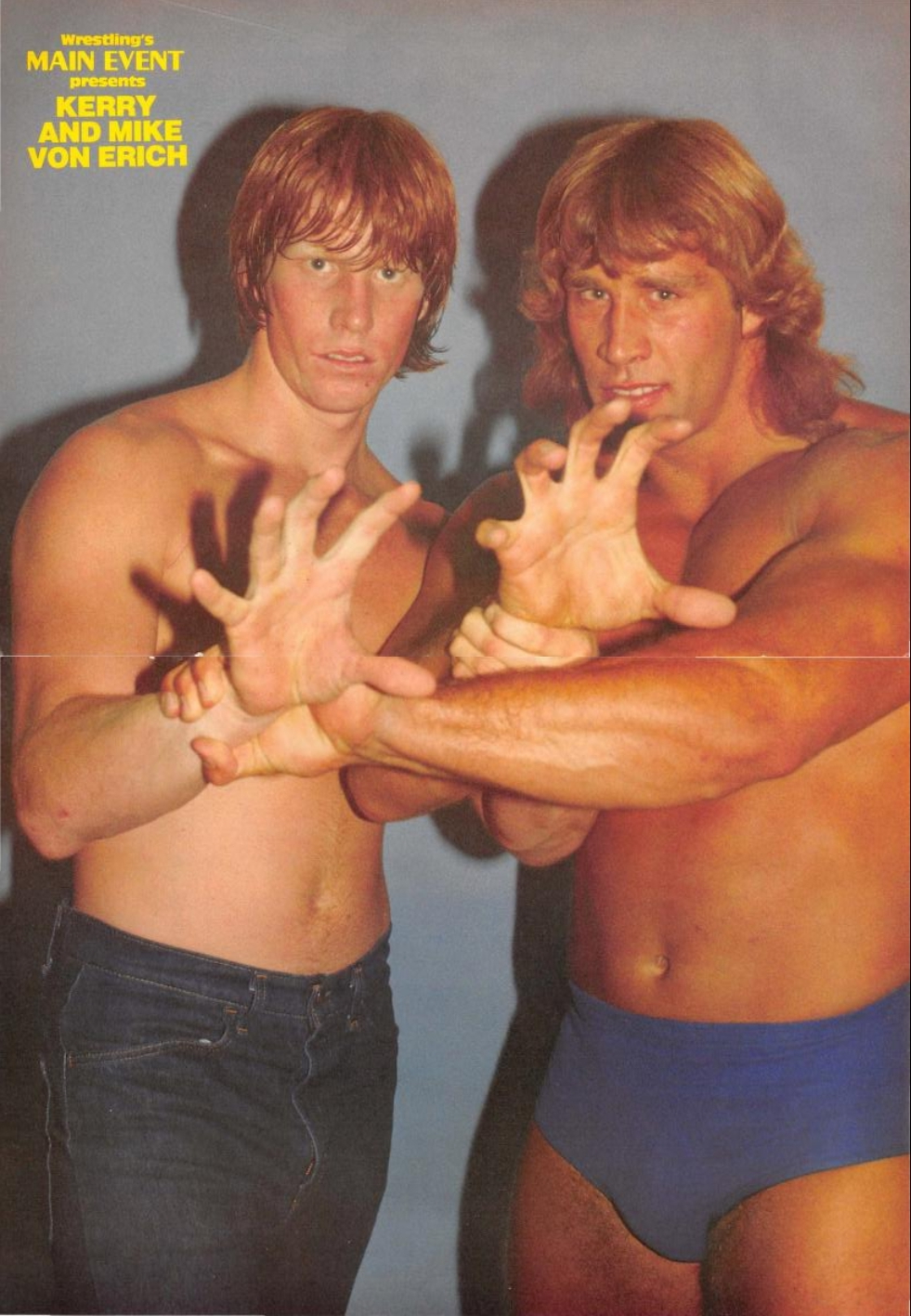
Von Erich family members Mike and Kerry were mainstays in World Class Championship Wrestling

In 1982, Continental Productions, a subsidiary of Dallas independent station KXTX, began syndicating a one-hour show internationally from the Sportatorium of former NWA affiliate World Class Championship Wrestling (WCCW) run by Fritz Von Erich. Dallas station KTVT had broadcast Von Erich's program as Saturday Night Wrestling for over a decade before KXTX began the second broadcast.

The KXTX broadcast was innovative because it more closely resembled a professional sportscast, with former football broadcaster Bill Mercer as host, mobile cameras at ringside with multiple shotgun microphones to capture and enhance the sound of impacts and crowd noise for boxing pay-per-views, and vignettes and interviews inspired by the Rocky movies to accentuate the heel or babyface of a wrestler outside the ring.

The show featured the babyface Von Erich brothers–David, Kerry and Kevin–against heels from the stable of Gary Hart, who culminated nearly two decades of his career in Texas by booking the feud between the Von Erichs and the Freebirds in 1982, and then Skandor Akbar's Devastation, Inc. stable in 1983. The KXTX program earned extremely high ratings–higher than Saturday Night Live and many wrestling promotions in the U.S., including the AWA and the WWF.

The Von Erichs were the most recognizable babyfaces in wrestling in 1982 and 1983. However, the family would become marred by death of nearly every wrestler associated with WCCW in the ensuing years, attributed to abuse of steroids, opiates and cocaine.

=== World Wrestling Federation expands ===
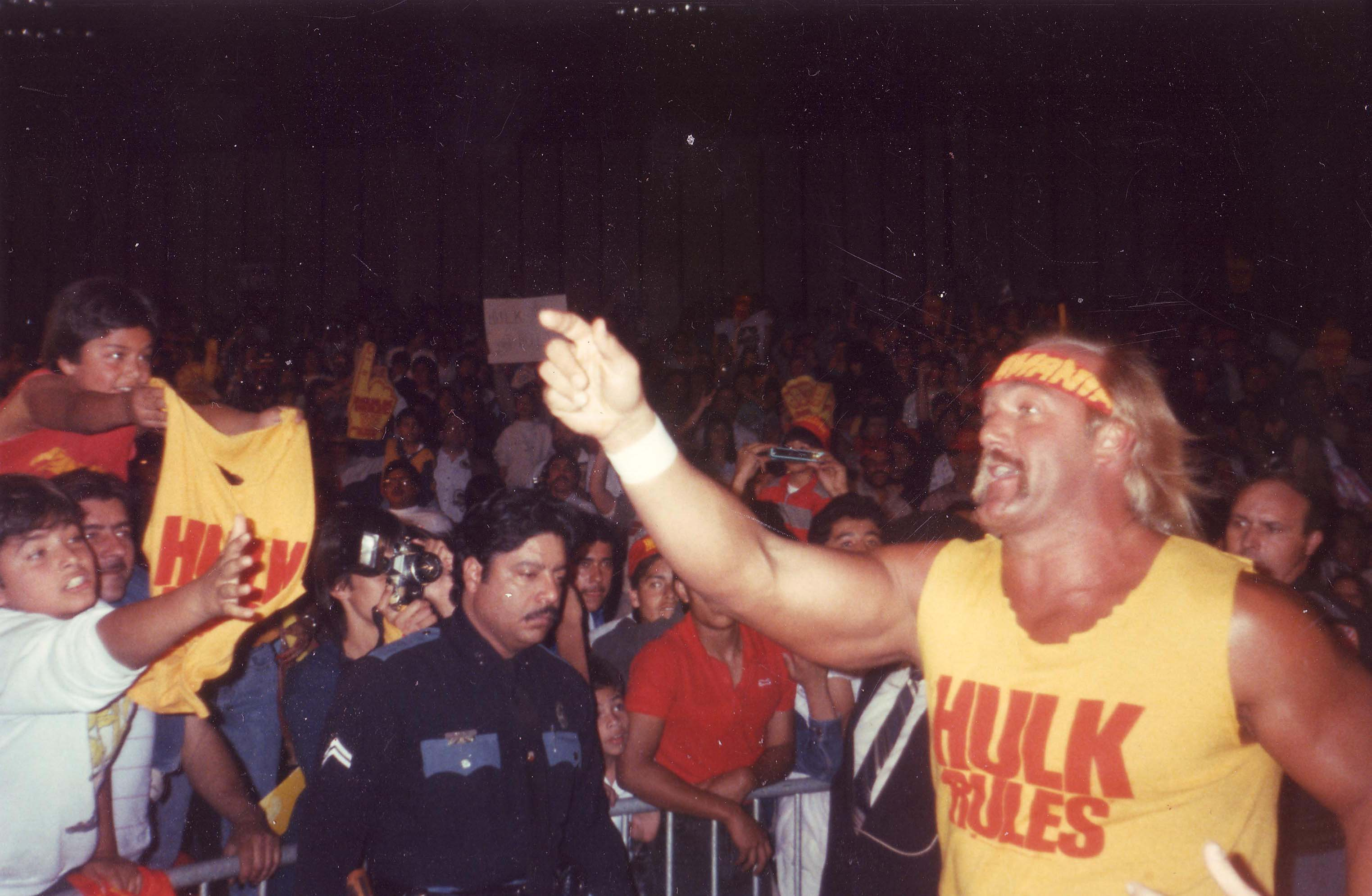
Hulk Hogan was the WWF's top star during the 1980s boom. Shown here in 1989.

In 1982, Vince McMahon purchased the WWF from his ailing father, Vincent J. McMahon. On December 23, 1983, the younger McMahon signed AWA superstar Hulk Hogan, who previously wrestled with the WWF from 1979 to 1981, to return to the company in 1984 after he had appeared in Rocky III. McMahon booked longtime WWF Champion and previous face of the company, Bob Backlund, to lose the title to The Iron Sheik in December 1983, only to lose it to Hogan weeks later. Shortly after the match, the WWF began promoting matches with Hogan in the main event in parts of the U.S. outside the Northeast, which changed a long-standing non-aggression pact between the WWF and other wrestling promotions. To play Hogan's nemesis, he signed talents including Jim Crockett Promotions (JCP) babyface "Rowdy" Roddy Piper, turning him heel, and AWA manager Bobby "The Brain" Heenan. McMahon later stated in the documentary The UnReal Story of Professional Wrestling that he did not think his father would have ever sold him the WWF if he knew what he was planning to do. "He probably would have said, 'Vinny, what are you doing? You're gonna wind up at the bottom of a river,'" he explained.

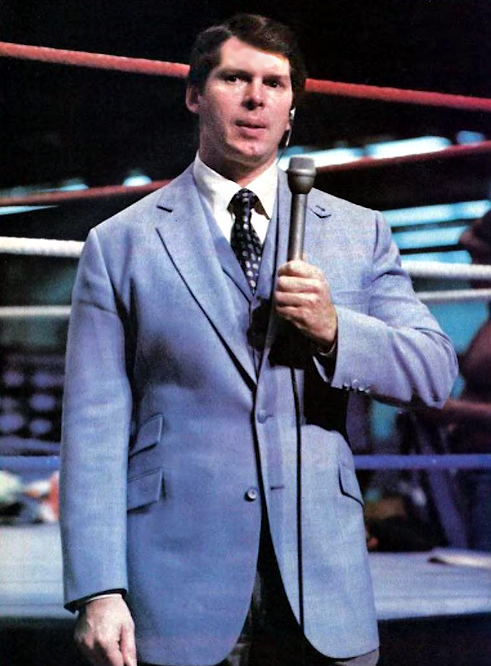
Vince McMahon, owner of then World Wrestling Federation, changed professional wrestling fundamentally in the 1980s

Meanwhile, other promotions tried to counter McMahon throughout the mid-1980s. On November 24, 1983, Flair defeated Harley Race for the NWA World Heavyweight Championship at the pay-per-view wrestling event Starrcade, which inaugurated Flair's golden era and was credited with showing that a major event could earn significant income across many locations. On February 10, David Von Erich died of reported acute enteritis in Japan. Although there was a short-term boost culminating in Kerry Von Erich's victory over Flair for the NWA World title in front of a packed Texas Stadium crowd on May 6, both the death of Gino Hernandez and the suicide of Mike Von Erich placed a cloud over WCCW that became its legacy. The AWA signed a television contract with ESPN, but the revenue was insignificant compared to the WWF's pay-per-view business, which was based on annual March/April events featuring Hogan in a landmark championship match each year from 1986 to 1991. With competition from cable superstations broadcasting WCCW, AWA and NWA, McMahon syndicated WWF television shows outside the promotion's traditional Northeastern territory and began a home video distribution label called Coliseum Video. McMahon would use the additional income generated by advertising, television deals and video sales and rentals to further his ambition to tour nationally. However, such a venture required huge capital investment–one that placed the WWF on the verge of financial collapse.

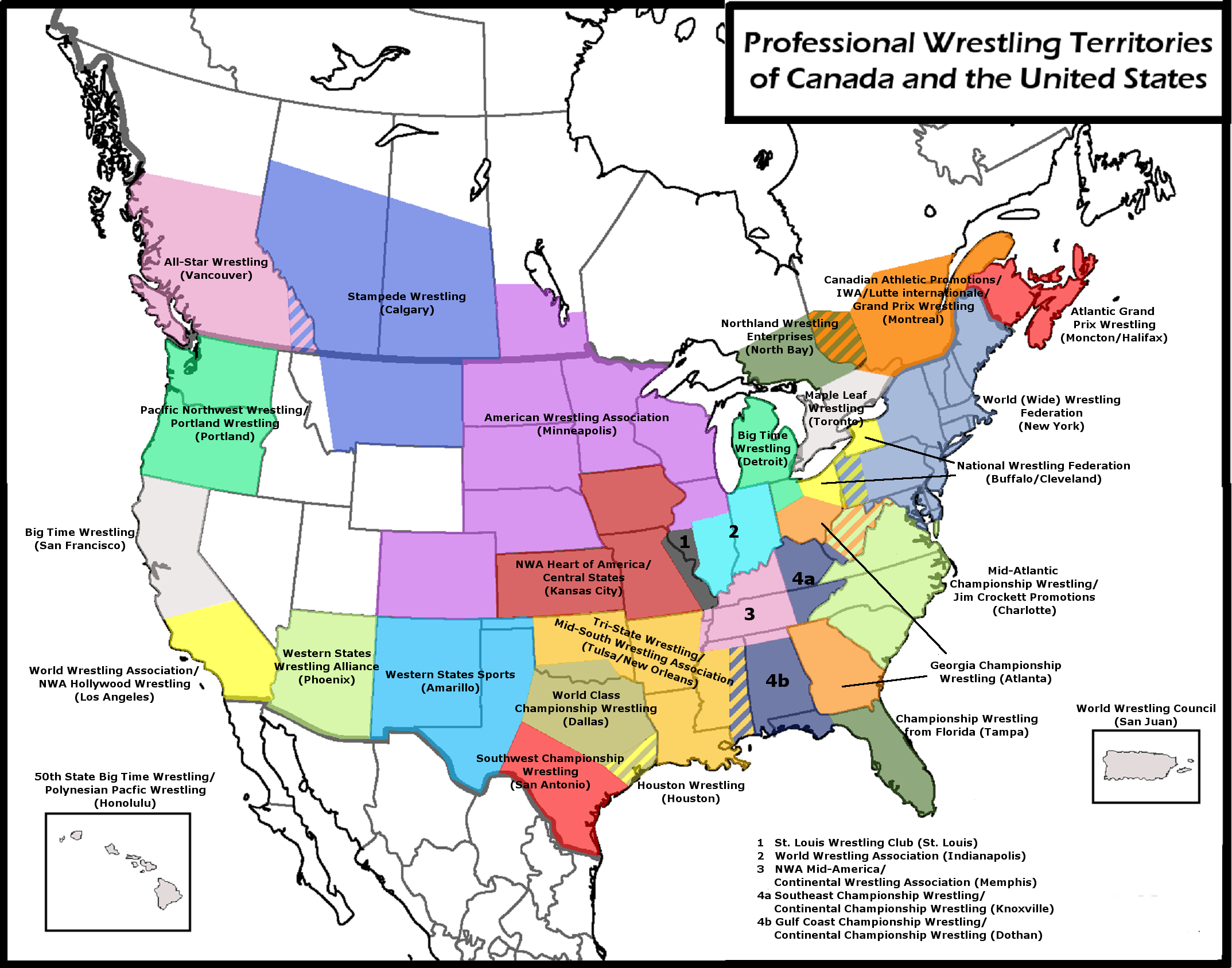
By the mid-1980s, many of the NWA territories were unable to compete with McMahon

McMahon did not meet immediate success. In May 1984, in a failed attempt to garner a greater appeal in the Southeast, McMahon bought a controlling interest in GCW, an NWA member which held the lucrative Saturday timeslot on Atlanta-based independent station WTBS—known outside Atlanta as Superstation TBS. On July 14, 1984–later dubbed "Black Saturday"–WWF programming began airing in the WTBS timeslot formerly occupied by GCW programming. The WWF programming was not successful and viewed as comical compared to the NWA. Due to low ratings and viewer protests, WTBS began airing wrestling by Ole Anderson's new promotion, Championship Wrestling from Georgia, as well as Bill Watts's Mid-South Wrestling, both of which garnered higher ratings than McMahon's WWF show. Later, McMahon sold the WTBS timeslot to rival promoter Jim Crockett, Jr. for $1 million. In the WWE documentary The Rise and Fall of WCW, Crockett explained that his purchase of the timeslot basically paid for McMahon's first WrestleMania.

By the end of 1984, the regional territory system of the NWA was clearly in jeopardy. In June 1984, Jack Tunney transferred his control in Maple Leaf Wrestling to the WWF. The AWA, WCCW and Memphis-based Continental Wrestling Association formed Pro Wrestling USA in 1985, but the endeavor failed by the end of the year.

Many fans, especially those in the Deep South, were angered by the collapse of their local wrestling promotions. Some of the more well-known promotions, including JCP and Championship Wrestling from Florida, were affected. These fans turned to WTBS, where station founder Ted Turner had launched World Championship Wrestling (WCW). In most of these areas, WWF shows were not financially successful until 1997–98.

=== Rock 'n' Wrestling Connection ===
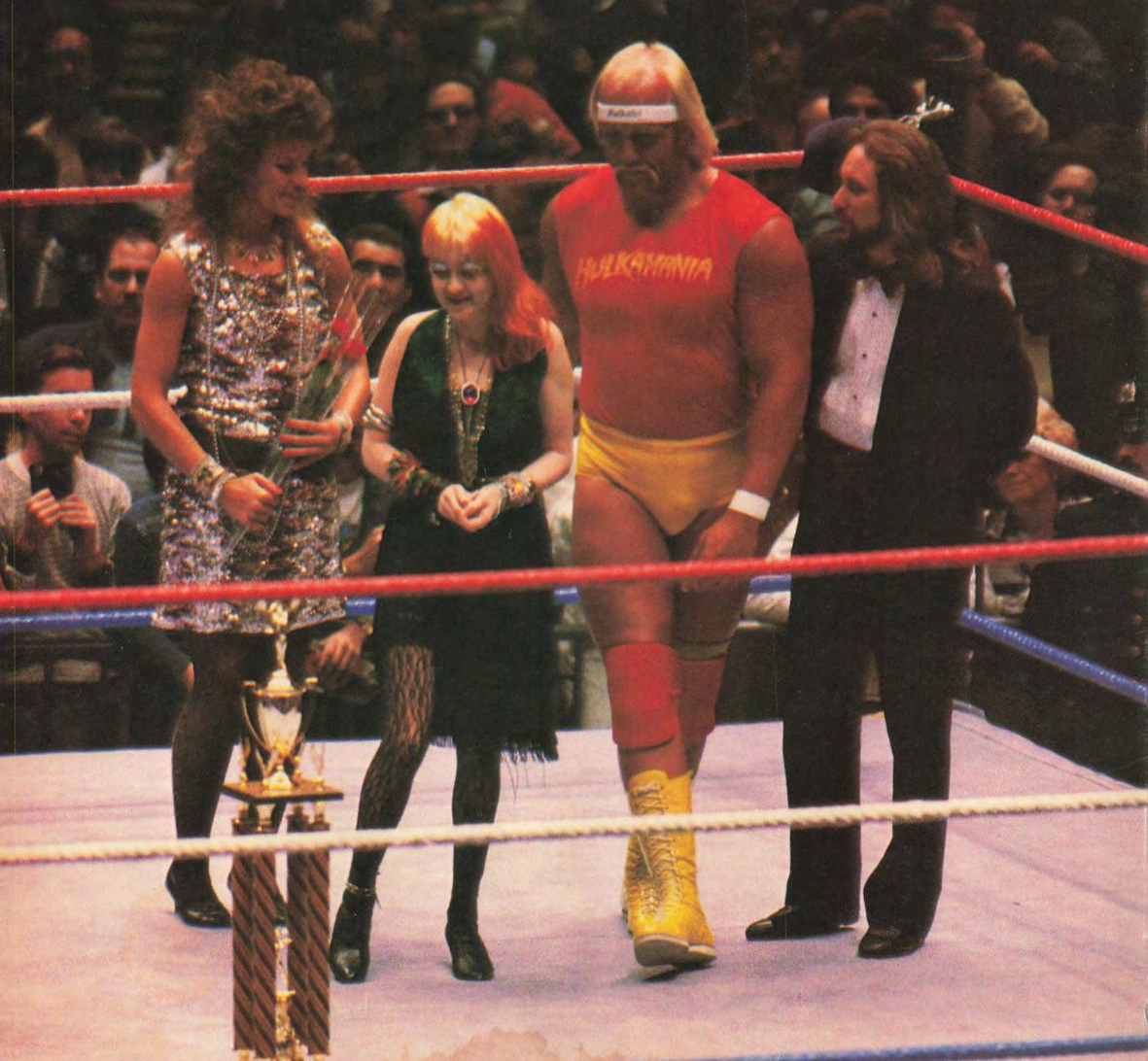
Wendy Richter, Cyndi Lauper, Hulk Hogan, and David Wolff, pictured in May 1985 during the Rock 'n' Wrestling Connection

The WWF would go on to a period of unprecedented success in the late 1980s and early 1990s. The success was in part precipitated by the "Rock 'n' Wrestling Connection", a period of cooperation and cross-promotion between the WWF and elements of the music industry. The idea was formed by WWF manager Lou Albano, who met singer Cyndi Lauper on a trip to Puerto Rico. Lauper asked Albano to appear as her father in her video for the single "Girls Just Want to Have Fun" (1983). McMahon later booked Lauper and Albano on a segment of Piper's Pit. During the segment, the Rock 'n' Wrestling storyline began when Albano called Lauper a "broad", while Lauper retaliated by hitting him with her purse. She then challenged Albano to a match between two female wrestlers of their choice.

MTV broadcast the first live wrestling match on cable television as well as the first live women's professional wrestling match. Lauper chose Wendi Richter, while Albano chose The Fabulous Moolah. The match was scheduled for July 23, 1984, at The Brawl to End it All, broadcast live on MTV. Richter defeated Moolah for the WWF Women's Championship, which the WWF had promoted as having been held by Moolah for the previous twenty-eight years. The connection between Lauper and the WWF continued with the video for the song "The Goonies 'R' Good Enough", "Time After Time", and "She Bop", all of which featured WWF wrestlers.

On September 14, 1985, Hulk Hogan's Rock 'n' Wrestling, an animated television series starring the character of Hulk Hogan, premiered on CBS. The series ran until June 6, 1987, in the process expanding Hogan's young fanbase.

Despite Hulk Hogan being regarded as a major player in the Rock 'n' Wrestling Connection, it has been acknowledged that Lauper and her then boyfriend and manager Dave Wolff, who was himself a wrestling fan, were among the most instrumental in helping the WWF connect with the MTV audience. Wolff has even been regarded as the person who engineered the Rock 'n' Wrestling Connection era for the WWF.

=== The inaugural WrestleMania ===
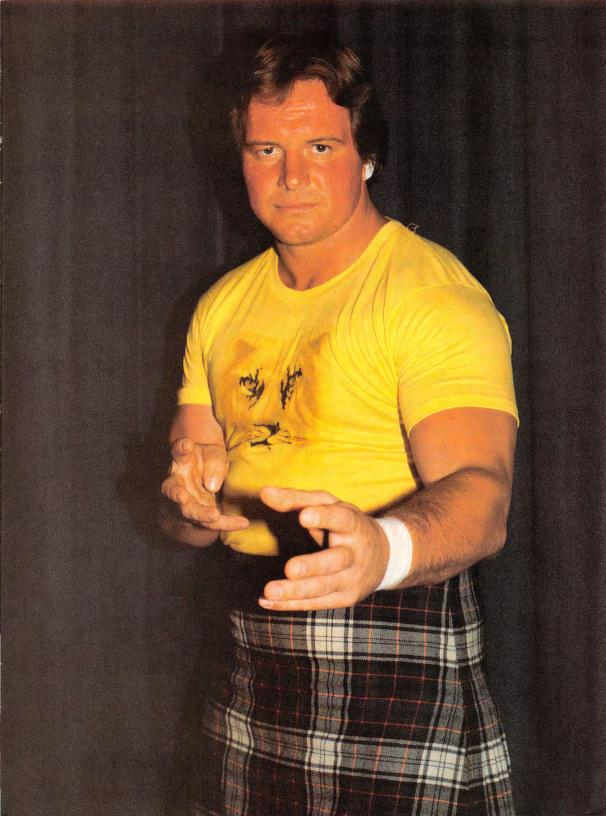
"Rowdy" Roddy Piper, who challenged Hulk Hogan at WrestleMania I and The Wrestling Classic

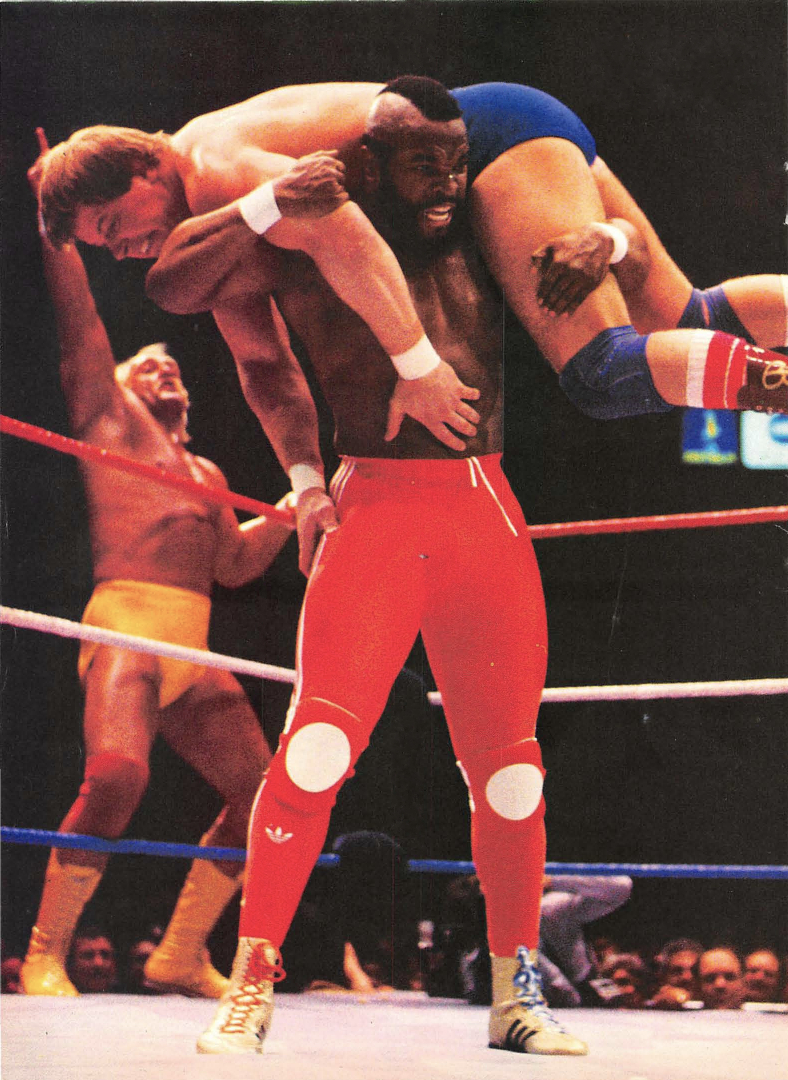
Mr. T hoists Roddy Piper up onto his shoulders as Hulk Hogan cheers in the background during the main event of WrestleMania I

In 1985, to counter the AWA's Super Sunday, the NWA's Starrcade and WCCW's Star Wars, the WWF created its own flagship show, WrestleMania, held at Madison Square Garden and broadcast on 135 closed-circuit networks. The future of not just the WWF's national experiment but the whole professional wrestling industry came down to the success or failure of this pay-per-view. WrestleMania was an extravaganza marketed as "the Super Bowl of professional wrestling". The concept of a wrestling supercard was nothing new in North America; the NWA had been running Starrcade a few years prior to WrestleMania, and even the elder McMahon had marketed large Shea Stadium cards viewable in closed-circuit locations. However, Wrestlemania drew the interest of the mainstream media by including celebrities such as Lauper and Mr. T to participate in the event. MTV's popularity and coverage of the women's wrestling feud generated a great deal of interest in WWF programming at this time.

The show was a huge success. Hogan, who won in the main event, appeared on the cover of Sports Illustrated which, after the swimsuit issue, was the magazine's best seller of 1985. Wrestling began to become mainstream, thanks, in large part, to the appeal of Hulkamania among children. Large television networks took wrestling into their weekly programming, including Saturday Night's Main Event, premiering on NBC in May 1985, as well as the syndicated weekly show WWF Championship Wrestling (which was also broadcast internationally). While Championship Wrestling was generally taped in Poughkeepsie, New York, Saturday Night's Main Event was taped in front of packed arenas around the country.

WrestleMania's popularity and ratings appeal made professional wrestling a television mainstay. Wrestling, now synonymous with the WWF, began to throw more grandiose matches. In November 1985, a second pay-per-view "The Wrestling Classic" took place. The concept, a one-night tournament, was a huge success and would become a regular event, titled King of the Ring.

=== NWA competes with WWF ===
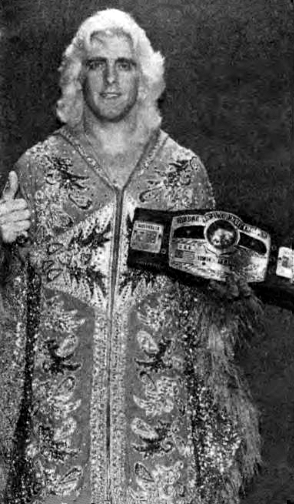
Ten-time NWA World Heavyweight Champion Ric Flair

Jim Crockett, also envisioning a nationwide promotion, absorbed several other NWA members into a single entity, JCP. In 1986, he renamed JCP "NWA World Championship Wrestling". He would acquire several more promotions, including some non-NWA members, in the following year. By late 1987, Crockett's ownership of so many NWA affiliates, coupled with his continued presidency of the NWA, gave him considerable power. However, Crockett's spending had left JCP indebted, with the promotion facing a $5 million deficit. Crockett's attempt to generate revenue with the broadcast of the highly promoted Starrcade pay-per-view in late 1987 was thwarted by McMahon, who held his Survivor Series pay-per-view on the same day. The WWF threatened to cancel their contracts with cable companies that dared to carry Starrcade. As a result, only five cable companies opted to remain loyal to Crockett, which gave them only an $80,000 profit after expenses. A similar situation arose in January 1988, when Crockett's Bunkhouse Stampede pay-per-view was counter-programmed by the inaugural Royal Rumble, which aired for free on the USA Network. On November 21, 1988, Crockett was obliged to sell his promotion to Ted Turner. Under the ownership of Turner, the promotion was rechristened World Championship Wrestling (WCW).

Onscreen, the NWA of the late 1980s was largely defined by its heel world champion, Ric Flair, and his Four Horsemen faction. Although various incarnations existed over the years, the dominant 1988 lineup included Arn Anderson, Tully Blanchard, and Barry Windham, and they feuded with the top fan favorites like Dusty Rhodes and Sting. As WCW sought to perform head-to-head with the WWF as the decade came to a close, Ricky Steamboat, who returned to the NWA after a stint in the WWF, emerged as a top babyface and feuded with Flair throughout 1989.

=== Hulk Hogan, André the Giant, Randy Savage, and Miss Elizabeth ===
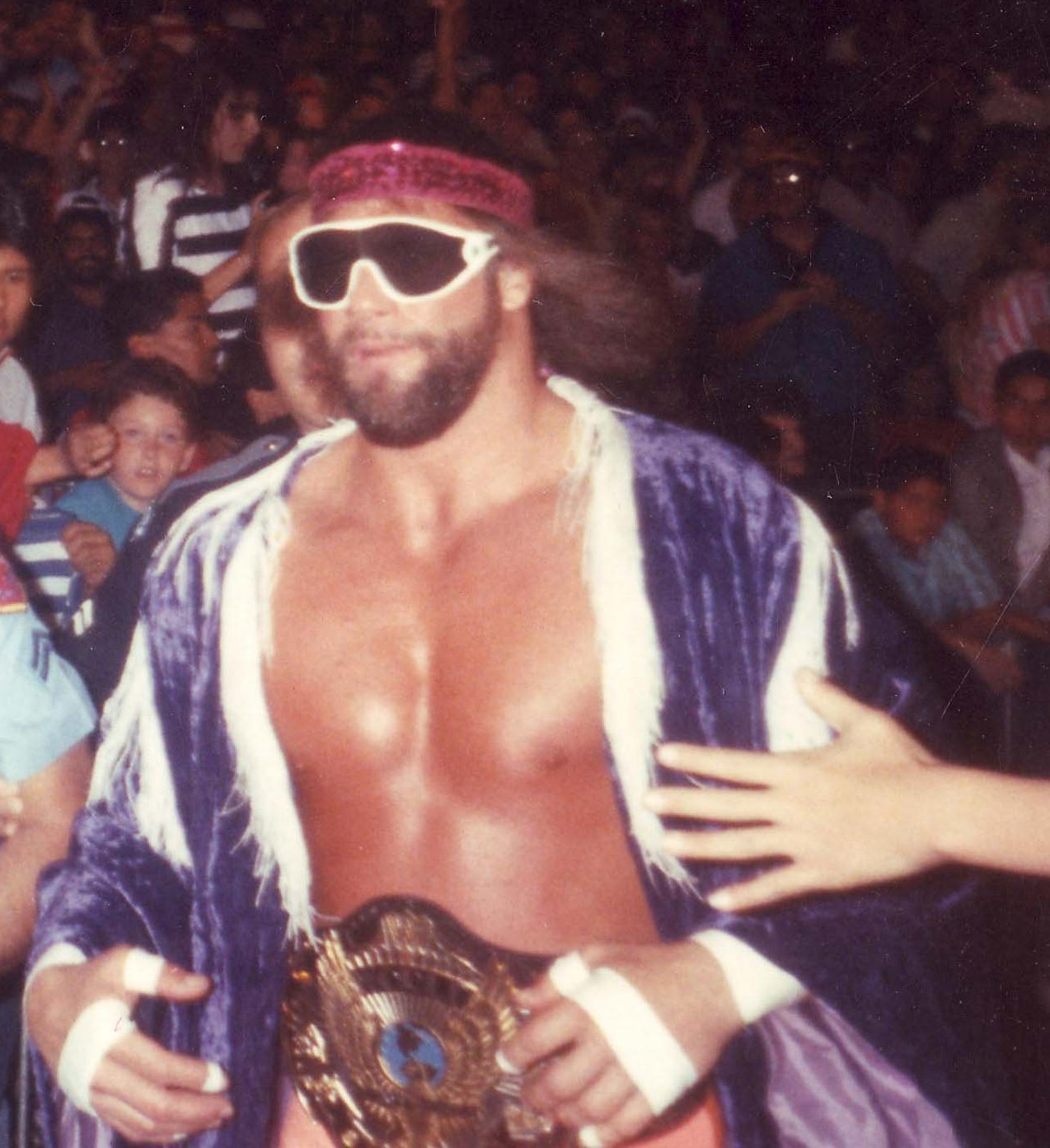
Randy Savage, pictured on March 7, 1989, won the WWF World Heavyweight Championship at WrestleMania IV

Andre the Giant on March 7, 1989.

WWF held its most successful event, WrestleMania III, in March 1987. It achieved the largest recorded attendance for a live indoor sporting event in North America with a claimed figure of 93,173 attendees. The main event, during which Hogan scoop-slammed (later dubbed "the body slam heard around the world") and defeated André the Giant, helped the show go down in wrestling history as one of the greatest ever produced and made the WWF's popularity soar. In February 1988, Hogan and André faced each other in a special WrestleMania III rematch on the Friday night prime time spin-off of Saturday Night's Main Event, titled The Main Event I which saw Hogan lose to André by manipulation of the "Million Dollar Man" Ted DiBiase. The live broadcast drew a 15.2 Nielsen rating and 33 million viewers, both records for American televised wrestling. After the match, André handed the title to DiBiase as promised, resulting in the title being vacated and setting the stage for a WWF World Heavyweight Championship tournament at WrestleMania IV. On a previous edition of the same show, "Macho Man" Randy Savage made his official transition from heel to babyface in his match against The Honky Tonk Man, with Miss Elizabeth bringing in Hogan to aid Savage against The Honky Tonk Man and The Hart Foundation. This eventually struck a friendship between Savage and Hogan.

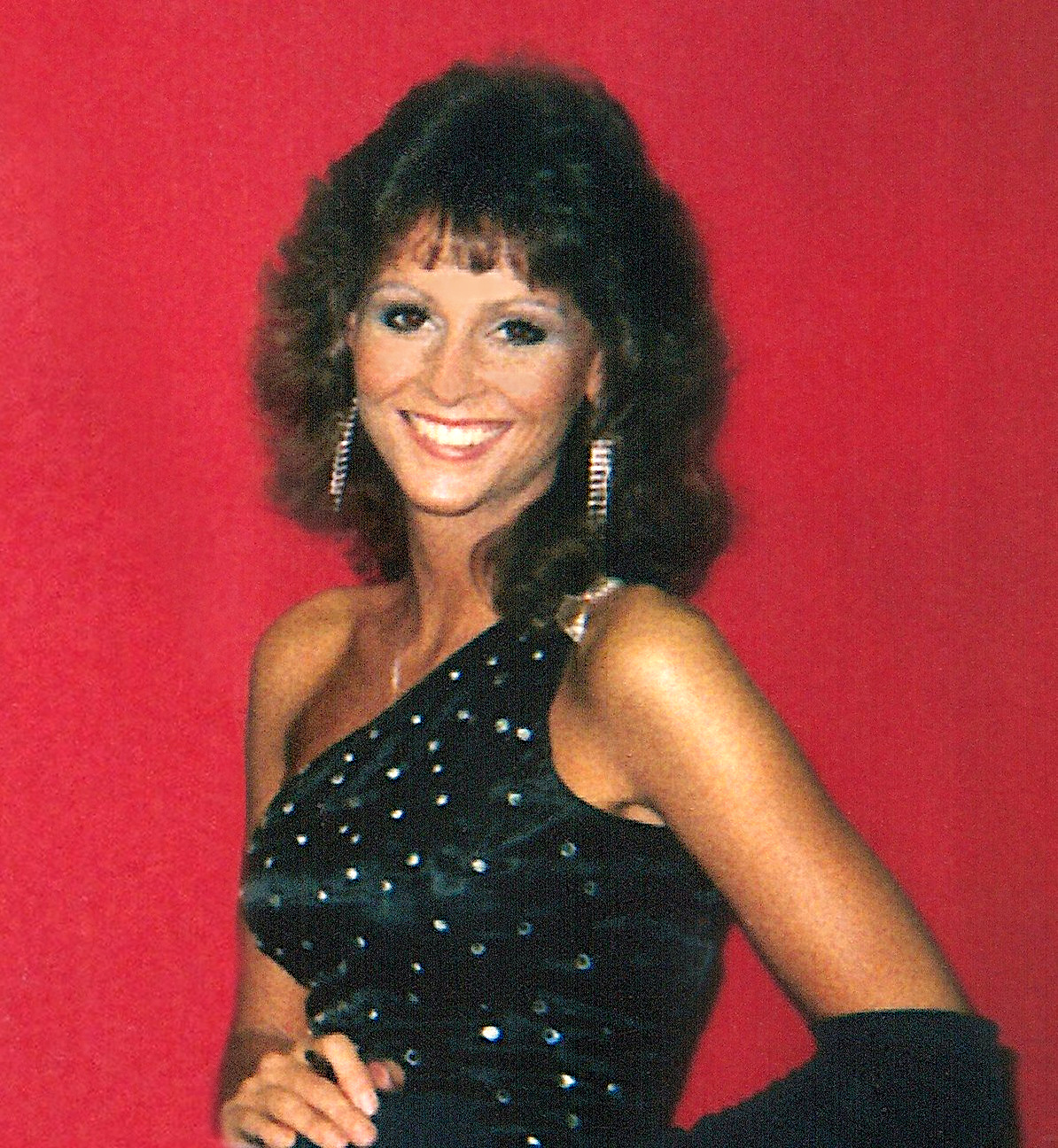
Miss Elizabeth managed The Mega Powers (Randy Savage and Hulk Hogan)

At WrestleMania IV, Savage won the WWF World Heavyweight Championship tournament, with Miss Elizabeth and Hogan at his side. Months later, Hogan and Savage teamed up as The Mega Powers; and at the first ever SummerSlam, they faced off against DiBiase and André's tag team known as The Mega Bucks. Though friends and tag partners, over the period of a year tensions began to build for various reasons, finally resulting in Savage striking Hogan in early 1989, turning Savage heel once again, and setting up a WWF World Heavyweight Championship match at WrestleMania V, which saw Hogan after over a year once again hold the title. Savage and Hogan continued to feud until the February 1990 edition of The Main Event III, where Hogan successfully defended the title in a special WrestleMania V rematch.

=== End of an era ===
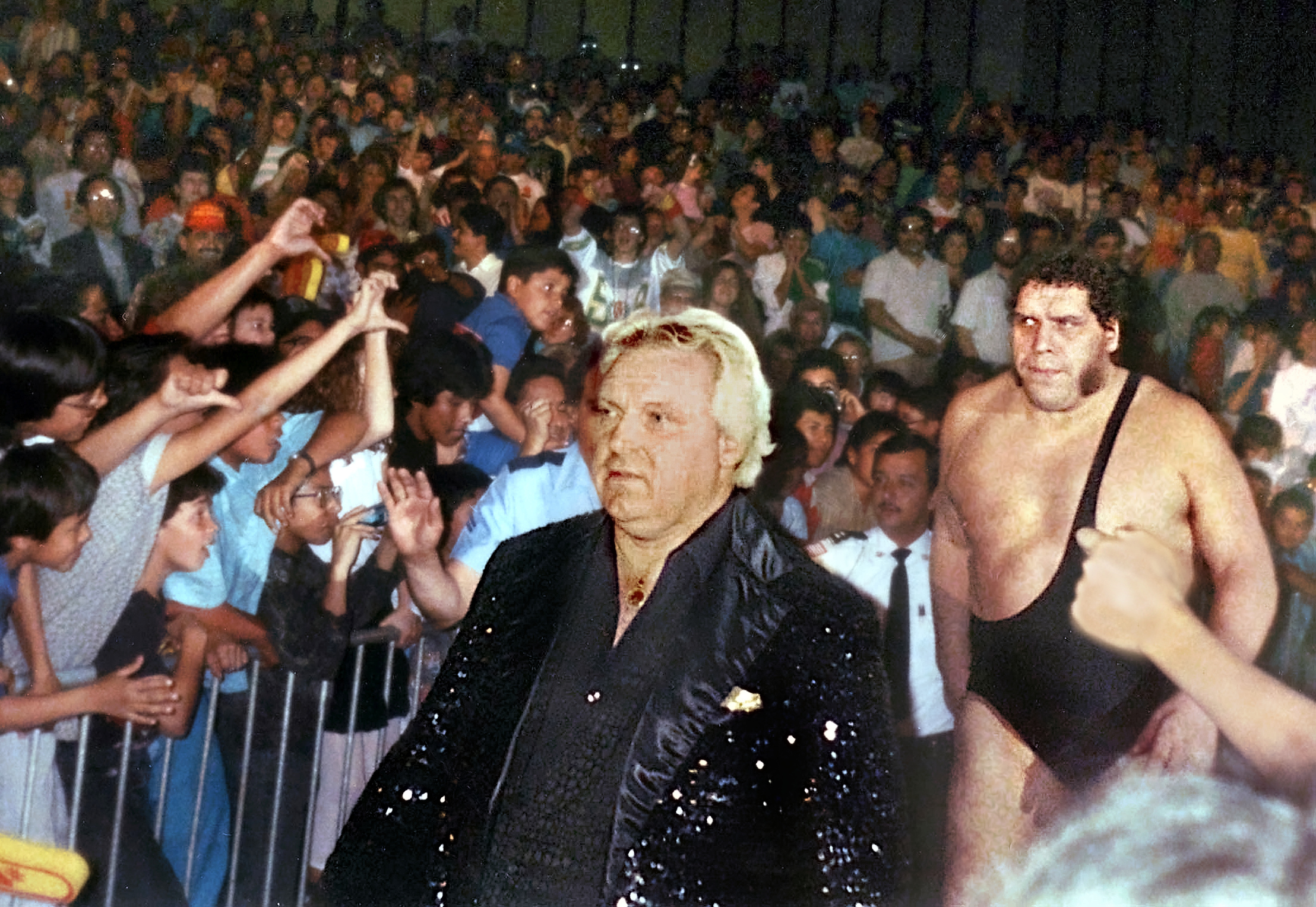
Bobby Heenan (left) managed André the Giant (right) throughout the later part of the decade. Here they are on March 7, 1989.

WrestleMania VI, on April 1, 1990, saw one of the last WWF appearances of André the Giant (as a member of the Colossal Connection), who had become barely mobile in the ring due to real life health issues, and his parting with long-time manager Bobby "The Brain" Heenan. In addition, Nikolai Volkoff (then part of The Bolsheviks) played his standard part as the evil Soviet Russian for one last time before turning babyface and embracing America, reflecting the end of the Cold War. The main event was a title-for-title match between WWF World Heavyweight Champion Hulk Hogan and Intercontinental Heavyweight Champion Ultimate Warrior. It not only pitted the WWF's two biggest faces against each other, but was intended as the "passing of the torch" from Hogan, the star of the 1980s, to Warrior, who was immensely popular and considered to be Hogan's successor. Hogan's clean pin fall loss signaled the Golden Era's decline.

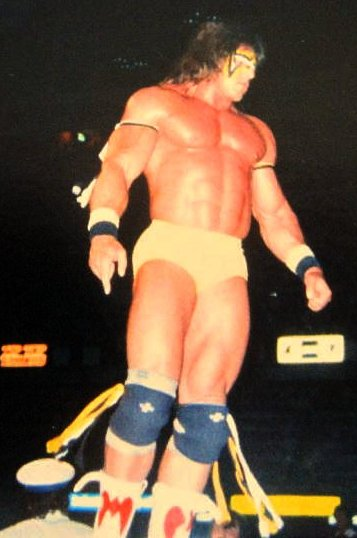
As the 1980s came to a close, Ultimate Warrior was seen as a potential successor to Hulk Hogan's status as top star in the World Wrestling Federation.

However, Hogan remained with the WWF for the next three years, winning the title another three times. After WrestleMania VI, Hogan started appearing with less frequency in WWF events, with Warrior taking most of the main-event spots for the rest of 1990 and up until the 1991 Royal Rumble. Miss Elizabeth left the WWF in April 1992, and divorced Randy Savage that August. Hogan's return to the WWF on a February 1993 episode of Monday Night Raw (which replaced another 1980s WWF program, Prime Time Wrestling) received a lackluster reaction from the crowds. Though it had been fading for the past few years, the WWF's Golden Era finally ended with Hulk Hogan's defeat to Yokozuna at King of the Ring 1993.

=== Aftermath ===
After years of financial turmoil and the constant changing of bookers, WCW would resume competition with McMahon's WWF when former AWA commentator Eric Bischoff was appointed as the promotion's Executive Vice President. Hogan left the WWF in early 1994, and joined WCW the following summer of 1994, while Randy Savage left the WWF for WCW in November 1994. Fans who were kids in the mid-late 1980s were teens by the 1990s, and many grew bored with the comic book style of wrestling of the 1980s, turning their attention away from their childhood favorites such as Hogan, Junkyard Dog, and "Superfly" Jimmy Snuka, in favor of newer and grittier wrestlers like The Undertaker, Shawn Michaels, Razor Ramon, Diesel, and Bret "Hitman" Hart in the New Generation Era; then in the Attitude Era in favor of Stone Cold Steve Austin, The Rock, Triple H, Big Show, Kane, Chris Jericho, Mick Foley, and The New Age Outlaws.

== See also ==
- History of professional wrestling
