= Willie Gilzenberg =

American businessperson (1901–1978)

- Born: William Louis Gilzenberg; October 24, 1901; Newark, New Jersey, U.S.
- Died: November 15, 1978 (aged 77); South Miami, Florida, U.S.
- Occupations: Businessman, booker, professional wrestler

William Louis Gilzenberg (October 14, 1901 – November 15, 1978) was an American booker, boxing and wrestling promoter in the New York and New Jersey areas. Gilzenberg is noted for being the very first on-screen authority at the World Wide Wrestling Federation, becoming the first president of the WWWF in June 1963. He held the position until his death in 1978, at which point he was succeeded by Hisashi Shinma. Gilzenberg was also a boxing promoter in New Jersey.

Gilzenberg died from cancer on November 15, 1978, in a hospital in South Miami, Florida. He was 77.

A few weeks after his death on December 2, Gilzenberg was inducted by the Veterans Boxing Social Club in Belleville, New Jersey. In 2010, he was inducted into the New Jersey Boxing Hall of Fame.
