= Pat Patterson =

Canadian-American professional wrestler (1941–2020)

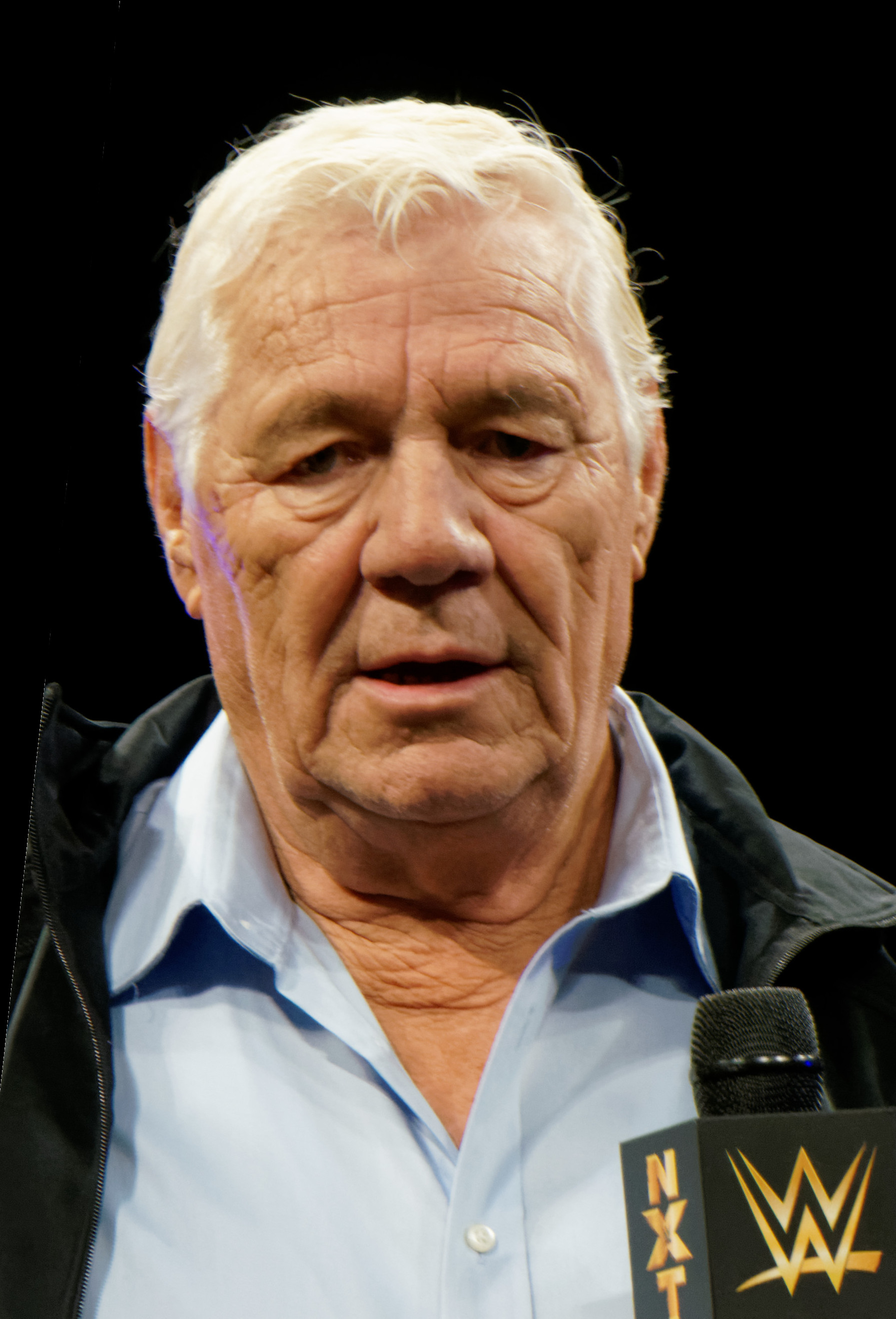
- Patterson in 2014

Personal information
- Born: Pierre Clermont; January 19, 1941 Montreal, Quebec, Canada
- Died: December 2, 2020 (aged 79) Miami, Florida, U.S.
- Life partner: Louie Dondero (1958–1998) (Dondero's death)

Professional wrestling career
- Ring name(s): Lord Patrick Patterson; Pat Andrews; Pat Patterson
- Billed height: 6 ft 1 in (185 cm)
- Billed weight: 237 lb (108 kg)
- Billed from: Montreal, Quebec, Canada; San Francisco, California
- Trained by: Loisirs Saint Jean Baptiste
- Debut: 1958
- Retired: June 25, 2000

Pat Patterson (born Pierre Clermont; January 19, 1941 – December 2, 2020) was a Canadian professional wrestler and producer, widely known for his long tenure in the professional wrestling promotion WWE, first as a wrestler, then as a creative consultant and producer, or agent. He is recognized by the company as their first Intercontinental Champion and creator of the Royal Rumble match. He was inducted into the WWF Hall of Fame as part of the class of 1996.

In 2019, Patterson became the oldest person to win a title in WWE history, after winning the WWE 24/7 Championship at age 78. He was described by journalist Dave Meltzer as "Vince McMahon's right-hand man" and "one of the chief architects of the WWE, playing an integral role in helping it become a global phenomenon".

== Early life ==
Patterson was born into an impoverished French-speaking family in the Ville-Marie borough of Montreal, Quebec, Canada on January 19, 1941. He began training to wrestle at the age of 14 at Loisirs Saint Jean Baptiste. He was raised Roman Catholic, and was an altar boy. He expressed an interest to a priest in becoming one himself, but was advised it would not have worked, because he was "too adventurous".

== Professional wrestling career ==
=== Early career (1958–1962) ===
Patterson debuted in Montreal, Quebec in 1958, wrestling at the Palais des Sports for promoter Sylvio Samson. Early in his career, he performed as "Killer" Pat Patterson.

=== Big Time Wrestling (Boston) (1961) ===
In 1961, Patterson - despite speaking no English - immigrated to the United States to pursue his professional wrestling career. He eventually became a U.S. citizen. Patterson initially worked for Tony Santos's Big Time Wrestling promotion in Boston, Massachusetts. While living and working in Boston, Patterson met his long-term partner, Louie Dondero.

=== Pacific Northwest Wrestling (1962–1965) ===
In 1962, Patterson was recruited by Mad Dog Vachon for Don Owen's Portland, Oregon-based Pacific Northwest Wrestling promotion. At the encouragement of PNW promoter Harry Elliot, who was aware of Patterson's homosexuality, Patterson developed the character of "Pretty Boy" Pat Patterson, an effeminate wrestler who wore lipstick, sunglasses, and a beret and carried a cigarette holder. In 1963, Patterson wrestled for promotions in Texas, Arizona and Oklahoma as part of a talent exchange organized by Owen. Patterson returned to Pacific Northwest Wrestling in 1964. He held the NWA Pacific Northwest Tag Team Championship on two occasions that year. On October 2, 1964, Patterson defeated Pepper Martin for the NWA Pacific Northwest Heavyweight Championship. He held the championship for six weeks before losing to Martin. Patterson won the championship again in 1965 and 1966.

=== Big Time Wrestling (San Francisco) (1965–1977) ===
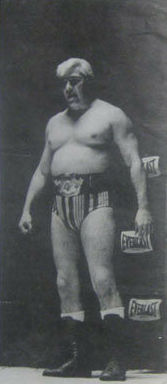
Patterson standing in a corner of the ring in 1975.

In January 1965, Patterson was hired by Roy Shire for his San Francisco, California-based Big Time Wrestling promotion. At Shire's request, Patterson dyed his hair blond to form a tag team with Ray Stevens, the Blond Bombers. The duo won the NWA World Tag Team Championship in 1965 and again in 1967. The Blonde Bombers were described by Bret Hart as "considered by many to be the best tag team of the 1970s". In 1968, Patterson wrestled for NWA Western States Wrestling in Amarillo, Texas as Lord Patrick Patterson, winning the NWA North American Heavyweight Championship and NWA Brass Knuckles Championship. In the same year, he undertook a six-week tour of Japan, facing Antonio Inoki in a series of bouts.

After Stevens turned face in the late 1960s, he had a feud with the heel Patterson, culminating in a Texas Death match, in which Stevens won the title from Patterson. In 1970 and 1971, Patterson wore a mask during his matches, and would cheat by placing a foreign object under the mask to add power to his headbutts. In 1972, Patterson turned face again, after feuding with Lars Anderson, who was managed by Dr. Ken Ramey. Later that year, he teamed with Rocky Johnson and won the tag team championship. In 1975 and 1981, Patterson won the Cow Palace Battle Royal in San Francisco.

=== Championship Wrestling from Florida (1977) ===
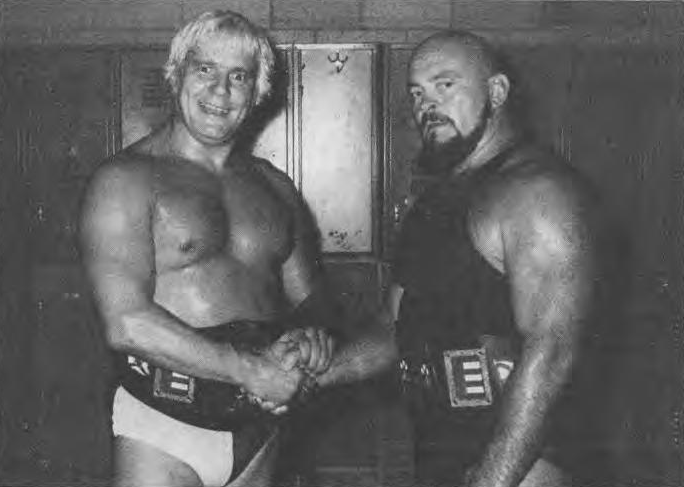
Patterson and Ivan Koloff as NWA Florida Tag Team Champions, circa 1977

In 1977, Patterson wrestled for Eddie Graham's Tampa, Florida-based Championship Wrestling from Florida promotion. During his run, he won the NWA Florida Television Championship and the NWA Florida Tag Team Championship, as well as briefly serving as booker.

=== American Wrestling Association (1978–1983) ===
In 1978, Patterson joined Verne Gagne's Minneapolis, Minnesota-based American Wrestling Association. He reformed The Blond Bombers with Ray Stevens, with the duo winning the AWA World Tag Team Championship later that year. Patterson performed intermittently for the AWA until 1983.

=== New Japan Pro-Wrestling (1979) ===
In 1979, Patterson toured Japan with New Japan Pro-Wrestling.

=== Lutte Internationale (1980–1983) ===
Patterson made his professional return to Quebec in 1980, wrestling a number of bouts for the Montreal, Quebec-based Lutte Internationale promotion. He held the Canadian International Tag Team Championship on five occasions between 1980 and 1983.

=== World Wrestling Federation / World Wrestling Entertainment / WWE (1979–2020) ===
==== North American Champion (1979) ====
In 1979, Patterson debuted in the World Wrestling Federation (WWF), working as a heel, under the tutelage of manager The Grand Wizard. As a villain, Patterson's primary feuds were with then WWF North American Champion Ted DiBiase and WWF Heavyweight Champion Bob Backlund. During a television taping on June 19 in Allentown, Pennsylvania, Patterson defeated DiBiase for the WWF North American Championship by using a pair of brass knuckles to knock out DiBiase. Patterson was unsuccessful, however, in winning the WWF Heavyweight Championship from Backlund.

==== Intercontinental Heavyweight Champion and retirement (1979–1984) ====
One of the several challenges made by Sgt. Slaughter for Patterson (at the time working as a color commentator) to break his cobra clutch hold in 1981, which led to their feud culminating in the alley fight match.

In September 1979, the WWF would introduce the WWF Intercontinental Championship, a secondary championship for its midcard wrestlers. Patterson was crowned the company's first Intercontinental Heavyweight Champion after an alleged tournament held in Rio de Janeiro. While Patterson's tournament "victory" is widely listed in wrestling title and match histories, the tournament itself never actually took place. Patterson's apocryphal title victory would later become something of an inside joke during Patterson's on-screen tenure as one of Vince McMahon's "stooges". The fictional tournament was also later profiled in-depth on WWE.com as an April Fool's joke. On November 8, Patterson dropped the North American title to Seiji Sakaguchi.

It was during Patterson's reign as champion that he turned face, after a botched attempt by the Grand Wizard to "sell" Patterson's contract to "Captain" Lou Albano for $100,000; Albano's protégés, the Wild Samoans, attacked Patterson after he cut a promo insulting Albano. Patterson held the Intercontinental Heavyweight Championship until April 21, 1980, when he was defeated by Ken Patera in New York City, New York. The match ended in controversial fashion after Patterson placed his right leg on the ropes just before the three count was made. On May 4, 1981, Patterson's feud with Sgt. Slaughter culminated in an alley street fight match in Madison Square Garden. The match was voted Match of the Year by the Wrestling Observer Newsletter.

==== Sporadic roles (1984–1997) ====
Patterson began doing color commentary in 1980 with Vince McMahon, calling WWF Championship Wrestling from 1980 to 1984. While Patterson was a face commentator when partnered with Gorilla Monsoon and Vince McMahon, he hosted a heel interview segment for French WWF broadcasts known as "Le Brunch de Pat", where he would politely ask questions in English but furtively mock his face guests in French. Patterson was on commentary with Monsoon when The Iron Sheik defeated Bob Backlund for the world heavyweight championship, as well as for when Hulk Hogan defeated The Iron Sheik about a month later. Patterson was also calling the action when Jimmy Snuka jumped off the steel cage and splashed Don Muraco in Madison Square Garden in 1983.

Patterson retired from wrestling in 1985. Although retired, Patterson continued to occasionally wrestle. On January 26, 1985, he wrestled Nikolai Volkoff in a losing effort in a house show in Cincinnati, Ohio. The following month, he teamed with Andre the Giant at a pair of house shows in Canada and defeated Ken Patera and Big John Studd.

He took the spot of Mad Dog Vachon on the WWF skit show Le Brunch on WWF Superstars in Canada until late summer in 1987. Several wrestlers like the Rougeau Brothers and Dino Bravo replaced him, and Frenchie Martin hosted Le Studio as a replacement of Le Brunch. Before that he made another appearance, this time in a battle royal in Montreal on February 24, 1987. He also appeared in a battle royal at a house show in Buffalo, New York on December 27. Patterson made a handful of additional appearances in Montreal in 1987, wrestling as a heel (while remaining a face or neutral backstage official in the United States and elsewhere in Canada). His most notable appearance was a win over the up-and-coming Brutus Beefcake on August 10 in Montreal His final match would come three weeks later again in Montreal as he fell in defeat to Beefcake and subsequently received a haircut with Mr. T as the referee.

He began working backstage as a road agent and right-hand man to WWF promoter Vince McMahon, and is credited with inventing and booking the Royal Rumble match. In the late 1990s, he also worked in the talent-relations department. After his retirement, Patterson also worked as a WWF referee. He was selected as the in-ring referee for the main event at the first WrestleMania at Madison Square Garden on March 31, 1985, as well as the main event of WrestleMania XI. In 1992, Patterson, along with Terry Garvin, were accused of sexual harassment of underage ring boys by former announcer Murray Hodgson, and former ring boy Tom Cole, who alleged that Patterson groped him and engaged in sexual harassment when he was 14. Both he and Garvin resigned from the company. After Murray Hodgson rescinded the allegations, he was rehired, while Garvin was fired, later reaching a settlement with WWF. Over the years he made appearances on pay-per-views or TV programming breaking up fights.

==== "Stooge" (1997–2000) ====
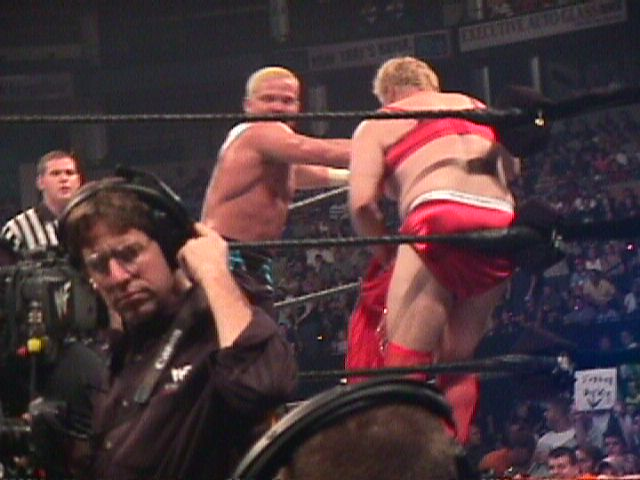
Crash Holly and Pat Patterson (right) at the WWF King of the Ring at the Fleet Center in Boston, MA in 2000.

In 1997, Patterson, along with Gerald Brisco, became comedy heels as the on-screen stooges of Vince McMahon, assisting their boss in his rivalries with Stone Cold Steve Austin, Mankind and The Rock. Patterson and Brisco were among the founding members of The Corporation. In order to mock Hulk Hogan, they used "Real American" as their entrance music and parodied Hogan's flexing routine as they approached the ring. On the May 18, 1998 episode of Raw, Patterson and Brisco competed in a 2 on 1 Street Fight against Austin that ended in a no contest when Vince McMahon and Dude Love attacked Austin.

Later in 1999, the two became entangled with the McMahon-Helmsley Faction. On the December 16, 1999 episode of SmackDown, Patterson and Brisco helped Test, who had been injured by D-Generation X. Triple H and Stephanie McMahon then forced Patterson and Brisco to compete for the WWF Tag Team Championship against The New Age Outlaws or be fired. Patterson and Brisco lost the match. In 2000, Patterson and Brisco joined Triple H and Stephanie McMahon.

On the May 8 episode of Raw, Patterson, Road Dogg and X-Pac faced Rikishi in a 3 on 1 handicap match and were disqualified after Patterson hit Rikishi with a chair. Afterwards, Patterson lowered his drawers to deliver a Stink Face to Rikishi with brown-stained underwear, which commentator Jim Ross described as a "tractor-sized skidmark". Patterson began to use the soiled underwear as part of his gimmick in the coming weeks, attempting to rub the soiled underwear into the faces of opponents. As a result, WWE commentators began to refer to Patterson as “Poopstain Patterson” during the broadcasts.

On June 12, 2000, when the Faction unmasked Kane, Patterson photographed Kane's "hideously scarred" face, and threatened to "expose him to the world" if he did not comply. Kane was forced to wrestle The Rock (then his ally) in a No Holds Barred match. When Patterson's film did not develop properly, Kane turned on the Faction.

On June 19, 2000, Patterson helped Brisco win the perpetually contested WWF Hardcore Championship from Crash Holly but during the victory celebration turned on his ally, blinding him with champagne and then breaking a second bottle over Brisco's head, and pinning the (kayfabe) unconscious champion. Brisco pursued Patterson into the women's locker room, where Patterson was hiding in drag. Subsequently, Vince McMahon scheduled them to fight over the Hardcore Championship in an Evening Gown match at King of the Ring 2000; in the course of the match, Crash Holly attacked both men and pinned Patterson to become Hardcore Champion.

==== Backstage roles (2000–2020) ====
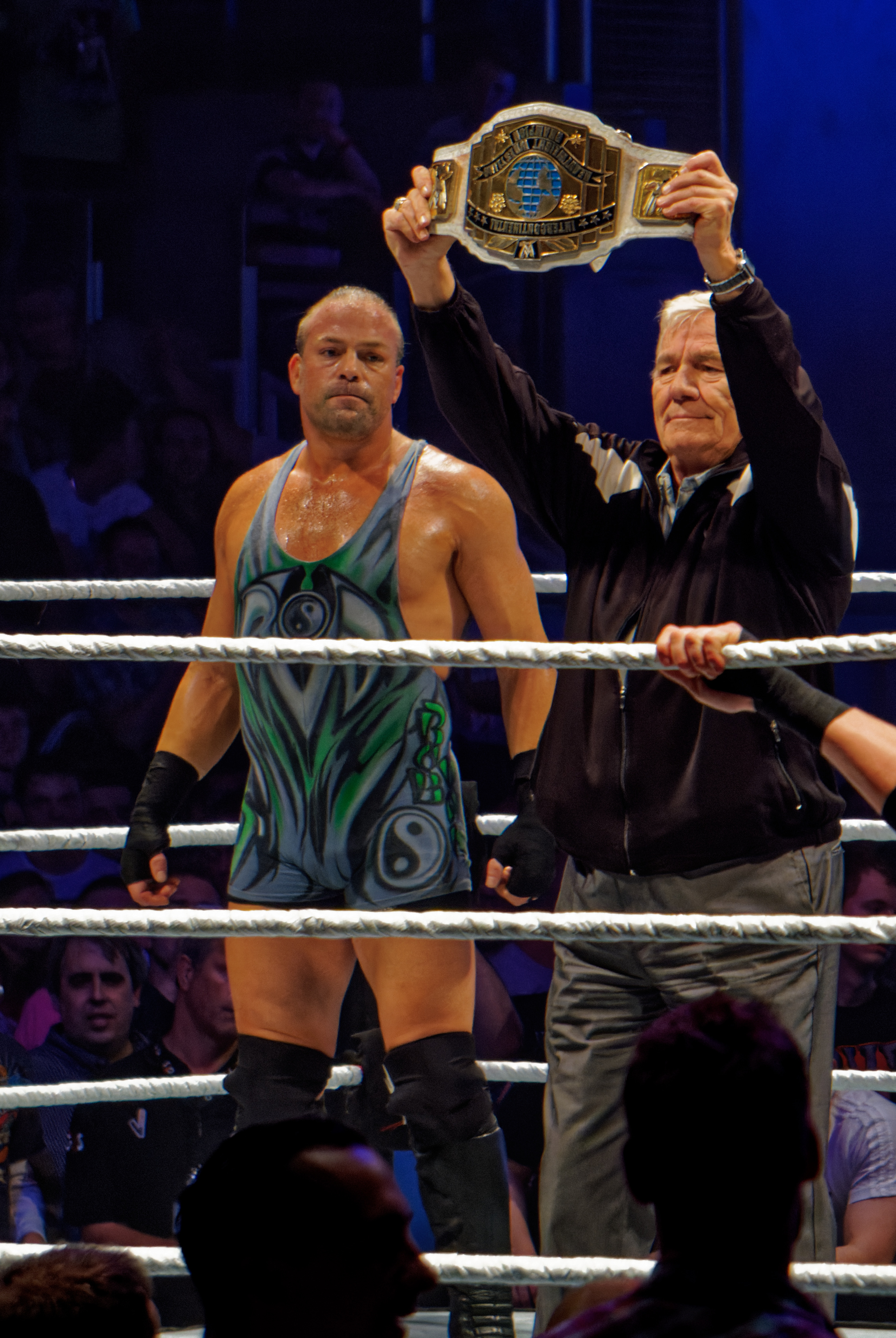
Patterson (right) holding the WWE Intercontinental Championship with Rob Van Dam looking on.

The Intercontinental Championship, unified with the World Heavyweight Championship at No Mercy on October 20, 2002, was resurrected on May 18, 2003, at Judgment Day in a battle royal. Patterson, as the first Intercontinental Champion, was at ringside to present the belt to the victor. Booker T eliminated Christian for the win, but the referee was unconscious. As Patterson attempted to give the championship belt to Booker T, Christian attacked him, stole the Intercontinental Championship belt and used it to knock out Booker T. The referee then recovered and awarded the match to Christian. In October 2004, Patterson retired from World Wrestling Entertainment. Patterson returned to WWE in a limited capacity in May 2005. While retired as a producer for WWE, he still acted as a creative consultant. At Breaking Point, Patterson made an appearance in his hometown of Montreal in an in-ring segment with Dolph Ziggler. Patterson was a regular cast member on the WWE Network original reality show Legends' House.

On July 22, 2019, during the Raw Reunion episode, Patterson won the WWE 24/7 Championship by pinning Drake Maverick backstage. He would lose the title to Gerald Brisco off-screen later that same night. At 78 years old, he became the oldest person ever to win a title in WWE history, beating The Fabulous Moolah's fourth reign with the original WWF Women's Championship at 76 years old. It was also Patterson's first title reign since June 19, 2000, with the similarly introduced WWF Hardcore Championship, which also used the "24/7 rule". He was only the second person ever to win both the 24/7 and Hardcore Championships, after R-Truth. He was working backstage as a WWE official from 2005 until his death in 2020.

== Personal life and death ==
Patterson was openly gay, having come out in the early 1970s. It was not acknowledged publicly or in WWE storylines until the finale of WWE Legends' House, which aired June 12, 2014. However, in the May 10, 1999 episode of Raw, commentator Jim Ross comments "and he’s single fellas" in response to a shirtless Patterson celebrating a win over the Mean Street Posse. NBC News described Patterson as "the first openly gay pro wrestling star." People magazine described him as the "First Gay Wrestling Star."

In the 1960s, after the end of the main part of the Lavender scare, the Justice Department's Immigration and Naturalization Service spent several years, from the end of 1964 onwards, looking for evidence of "homosexual activity" in order to have Patterson deported back to Canada. Documents disclosed as a result of Freedom of Information Act requests show that, as a part of a Portland Police Bureau Morals Division investigation into the Portland, Oregon gay community, PPB had reported Patterson's presence at "'gay' parties" and gay bars in the city and that Patterson was known to pick up male prostitutes in Portland. The documents also describe interviewees' suspicions that Louie Dondero was Patterson's romantic partner, as well as his agent, and that they had an open relationship. The same documents reveal that the United States Air Force Office of Special Investigations were investigating another wrestler suspected of being gay, with a view to discharging him; this wrestler subsequently denounced Patterson to INS before retracting. In November 1966, the INS initiated deportation proceedings against Patterson, leading to an interview where he was asked about his effeminacy, dyed hair, about whether he was a homosexual and whether "he molested little boys". In December 1966, Patterson was served with a deportation notice, requiring him to leave the United States on or before January 10, possibly as an attempt to dupe Patterson into leaving with an expectation of an easy green card but with the intention of excluding him through psychological exam; however Patterson was fighting again in Arizona 4 days later. After Patterson's application for a green card in 1971, the journalist's dossier of Freedom of Information responses showed nothing further until his successful naturalization in 2002.

Patterson's longtime partner was Louie Dondero. Patterson said on WWE Legends' House he and Dondero were together for 40 years. Dondero died of a heart attack on June 28, 1998, the same night as King of the Ring. In August 2006, Patterson underwent emergency heart surgery to remove a cyst from his coronary artery. In October, Patterson recovered from his operation and was released from the hospital. He legally changed his name to Pat Patterson in 2008.

=== Death ===
Patterson died of liver failure caused by a blood clot at a Miami, Florida, hospital on December 2, 2020. He was 79 years old. Many figures in the wrestling world paid their respects to Patterson, as both an in-ring performer and as a behind-the-scenes figure.

== Bibliography ==
- Accepted: How the First Gay Superstar Changed WWE (August 9, 2016)

== Championships and accomplishments ==
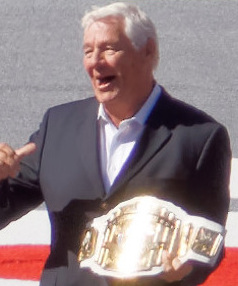
Patterson was the first WWF Intercontinental Heavyweight Champion, shown here with the championship belt at WrestleMania 31.

- American Wrestling Association
  - AWA World Tag Team Championship (1 time) – with Ray Stevens
- Big Time Wrestling (San Francisco)
  - NWA United States Heavyweight Championship (San Francisco version) (5 times)
  - NWA World Tag Team Championship (San Francisco version) (11 times) – with Ray Stevens (2), Superstar Billy Graham (1), Pedro Morales (1), Pepper Gomez (1), Peter Maivia (1), Moondog Mayne (1), Rocky Johnson (3), and Tony Garea (1)
- Cauliflower Alley Club
  - Art Abrams Lifetime Achievement Award (2008)
  - Other honoree (1995)
- Championship Wrestling from Florida
  - NWA Florida Tag Team Championship (1 time) – with Ivan Koloff
  - NWA Florida Television Championship (1 time)
- Lutte Internationale
  - Canadian International Tag Team Championship (5 times) – with Raymond Rougeau (2) and Pierre Lefebvre (3)
- New Japan Pro-Wrestling
  - NWA North American Tag Team Championship (Los Angeles/Japan version) (1 time) – with Johnny Powers
- NWA Hollywood Wrestling
  - NWA Americas Heavyweight Championship (1 time)
- NWA Western States Sports
  - NWA Brass Knuckles Championship (Amarillo version) (1 time)
  - NWA North American Heavyweight Championship (Amarillo version) (1 time)
- Pacific Northwest Wrestling
  - NWA Pacific Northwest Heavyweight Championship (3 times)
  - NWA Pacific Northwest Tag Team Championship (2 times) – with Tony Borne (1) and The Hangman (1)
- Pro Wrestling Illustrated
  - PWI Stanley Weston Award (2004)
  - PWI Ranked him #110 of the 500 best singles wrestlers of the PWI Years in 2003.
- Professional Wrestling Hall of Fame
  - Class of 2006 – as a member of The Blond Bombers
- World Championship Wrestling
  - IWA World Tag Team Championship (1 time) – with Art Nelson
- World Wrestling Federation/WWE
  - WWE 24/7 Championship (1 time)
  - WWF Hardcore Championship (1 time)
  - WWF North American Heavyweight Championship (1 time)
  - WWF Intercontinental Heavyweight Championship (1 time, inaugural)
  - WWF Hall of Fame (Class of 1996)
- Wrestling Observer Newsletter
  - Match of the Year (1981) vs. Sgt. Slaughter in an Alley Fight on April 21, 1981
  - Worst Match of the Year (2000) vs. Gerald Brisco at King of the Ring on June 25, 2000, in Boston, Massachusetts
  - Wrestling Observer Newsletter Hall of Fame (Class of 1996)

== See also ==
- The Blond Bombers
- The Corporation
