= Big Time Wrestling (San Francisco) =

American professional wrestling promotion

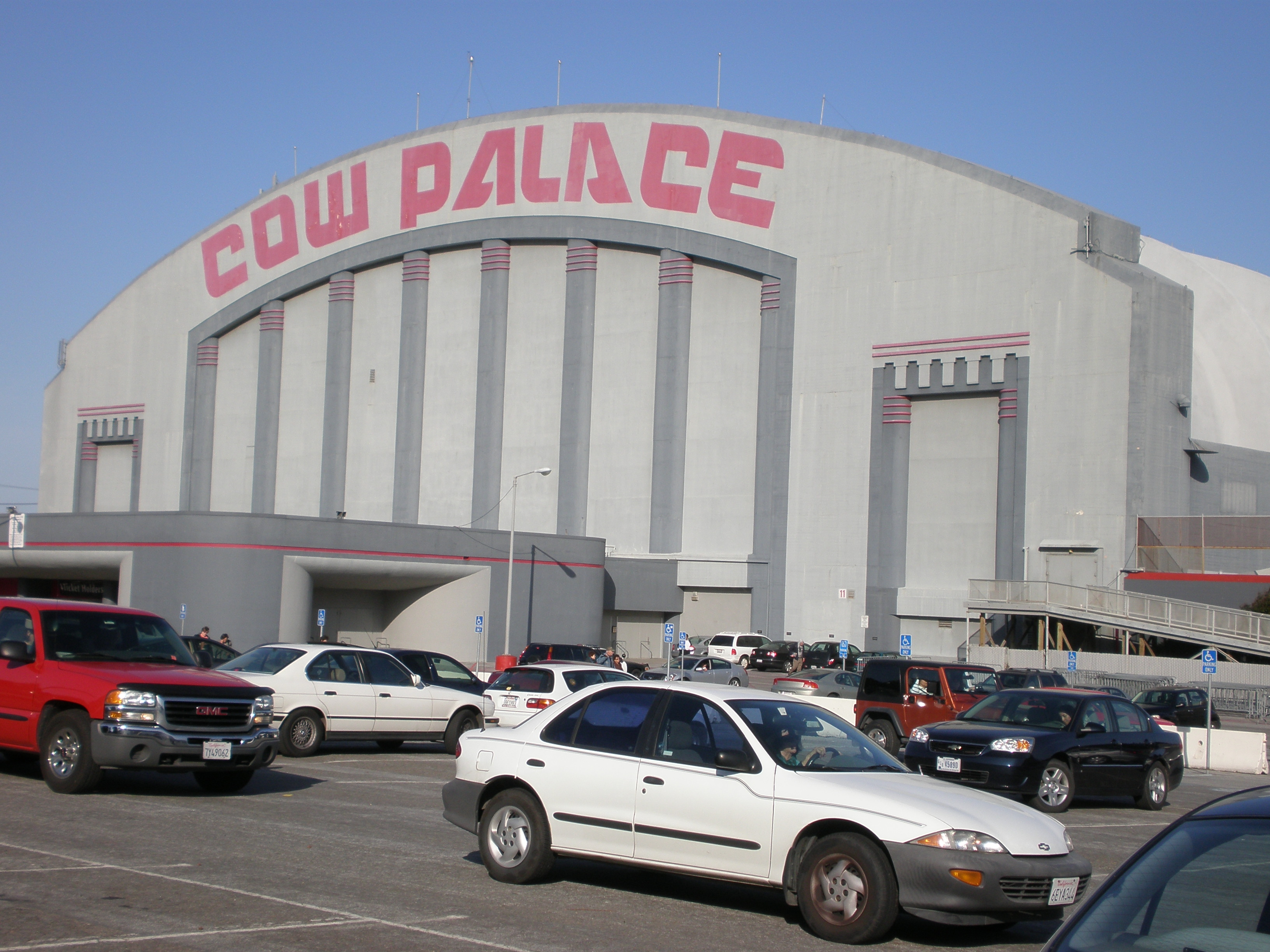
- The Cow Palace, the home of Big Time Wrestling.
- Founded: October 1960
- Defunct: January 1981
- Headquarters: San Francisco, California, United States
- Owner: Roy Shire (1960–1981)
- Parent: Pacific Coast Athletic Corp.
- Formerly: American Wrestling Alliance; National All-Star Wrestling

Big Time Wrestling – also known as the American Wrestling Alliance (AWA) or National All-Star Wrestling, and sometimes referred to as NWA San Francisco – was a professional wrestling promotion headquartered in San Francisco, California, in the United States. Founded by "Professor" Roy Shire (1922–1992) in 1960, the promotion emerged as one of the most profitable in the United States thanks to its "red hot angles" and "good TV". The promotion's heartland was the San Francisco Bay Area, with the Cow Palace as its core venue, but it also ran regular shows in cities including Fresno, Las Vegas, Oakland, San Jose, Stockton and Sacramento. Shire folded the promotion in 1981.

== History ==
From November 1935, professional wrestling in San Francisco was dominated by Joe Malcewicz's NWA San Francisco promotion, a member of the National Wrestling Alliance. After sustaining a severe knee injury, NWA San Francisco wrestler "Professor" Roy Shire decided to move into promoting in direct competition with Malcewicz. In October 1960, Shire registered the Pacific Coast Athletic Corp. with the California State Athletic Commission over Malcewicz's objections. Big Time Wrestling was an "outlaw" promotion that did not respect the territorial boundaries decreed by the NWA.

Shire secured a television slot on the fledgling independent Oakland television station KTVU in 1961 and spent several weeks airing tapes of matches from the Midwest. In January 1961, he began airing National All-Star Wrestling, a live show recorded in the KTVU studio that aired at 19:00 PST on Friday evenings, originally hosted by Bill Welsh and then by Walt Harris. Shire would later begin producing a second weekly show, Big Time Wrestling this one airing on KOVR. Big Time Wrestling was originally hosted by Harris, then later by Hank Renner.

Shire staged his first show in the Cow Palace in Daly City, California on the outskirts of San Francisco on March 4, 1961. Headlined by a bout between Mitsu Arakawa and Bill Melby, the event recorded an attendance of 16,553. A show staged by Malcewicz three days later attracted 2,841 people. Shire would ultimately prevail and NWA San Francisco folded in 1962. Together with Los Angeles–based Worldwide Wrestling Associates, Big Time Wrestling challenged the control of the NWA over the Pacific Coast. In Shire's first year of trading, the promotion brought in revenue of $175,000 (equivalent to $1,885,440 in 2025).

Big Time Wrestling promoted shows throughout the San Francisco Bay Area. Its base was the Cow Palace, where it held shows each Friday. Together with his bookers, Johnny Doyle and later Red Bastien, Shire built the promotion around the principles of "action, high spots and realistic matches". Shire positioned Ray Stevens as the promotion's main heel. The promotion's flagship event was an annual 18-man battle royal, with the winner receiving storyline large sums of money.

As Big Time Wrestling expanded, it began promoting in other Californian cities including Fresno and Sacramento, as well as Las Vegas in Nevada.

In August 1968, Big Time Wrestling became a member of the NWA. Shire served as vice-president of the organisation for a period in the early-1970s.

KTVU cancelled Big Time Wrestling in 1970. In 1970, Shire secured a new deal with the Sacramento station KTXL, airing Big Time Wrestling at 19:00 PST on Saturday evenings. The show featured Hank Renner as play-by-play announcer. He was later joined by Pepper Martin as color commentator.

In 1970, the promotion expanded into Anchorage, Alaska, where it was involved with many successful shows during the late 1950s and early 1960s. Attendance was not robust enough to support regular appearances and the promotion did not return; the next wrestling show in Anchorage was not until 1974, featuring talent booked through Detroit's Big Time Wrestling.

By the late-1970s, attendances had begun to dwindle. In 1979, Big Time Wrestling was cancelled. In 1980, Shire suffered a heart attack. A burned out Shire retired from promoting in January 1981 after Verne Gagne's American Wrestling Association, through local promoter and former wrestler Leo Nomellini, moved into San Francisco. Shire's final show was a battle royal at the Cow Palace that reportedly drew $64,000 (equivalent to $227,000 in 2025). In 1984, a disgruntled Shire gave an interview to The Sacramento Bee in which he broke kayfabe by acknowledging all the matches he promoted were staged.

== Championships ==
Championship	Created	Abandoned	Notes
NWA United States Heavyweight Championship (San Francisco version)	1960	1981	The American Wrestling Alliance United States Championship was created in November 1960 with Ray Stevens declared the inaugural champion. In 1968, it was renamed the NWA United States Heavyweight Championship after Big Time Wrestling joined the National Wrestling Alliance. The championship was retired in 1981 when the promotion folded.
NWA World Tag Team Championship (San Francisco version)	1961	1979	The Big Time Wrestling World Tag Team Championship was created in June 1961 with Guy and Joe Brunetti billed as the inaugural champions. In 1968, it was renamed the NWA World Tag Team Championship after Big Time Wrestling joined the National Wrestling Alliance. It was abandoned in 1979 as the promotion wound down.

== Alumni ==
- André the Giant
- Lars Anderson
- Mitsu Arakawa
- Red Bastien
- Bobo Brazil
- Haystack Calhoun
- Dick the Bruiser
- Terry Garvin
- Pepper Gomez
- Superstar Billy Graham
- Chavo Guerrero
- Mando Guerrero
- Rocky Johnson
- Peter Maivia
- Pepper Martin
- Moondog Mayne
- Don Muraco
- Dick Murdoch
- Pat Patterson
- Roddy Piper
- Buddy Rose
- Dutch Savage
- Kinji Shibuya
- Wilbur Snyder
- Ray Stevens
- Professor Toru Tanaka
- Bill Watts
- Raúl Mata

== See also ==
- NWA San Francisco
