= Bull Ortega =

American professional wrestler (1922–1977)

Personal information
- Born: Jesús Melendez Ortega; May 12, 1922 Douglas, Arizona, U.S.
- Died: July 28, 1977 (aged 55) Calgary, Alberta, Canada

Professional wrestling career
- Ring name(s): Bull Ortega; Chuy Cárdenas; Don Ortega; Jesse Cardenas; Jess Ortega; Jesús Cárdenas; Jesús Ortega; Mighty Ortega; Mighty Ursus; Ortega-San; La Roca Ortega; La Rocca Ortega; El Toro Ortega
- Billed height: 5 ft 11 in (180 cm)
- Billed weight: 352 lb (160 kg)
- Debut: 1952
- Retired: 1975

Jesús Melendez "Jess" Ortega (May 12, 1922 – July 28, 1977) was an American professional wrestler known as Bull Ortega and Mighty Ursus. He worked for Stampede Wrestling in Calgary, Big Time Wrestling in Detroit, Maple Leaf Wrestling in Toronto and the World Wide Wrestling Federation from 1966 to 1969.

== Early life ==
Jesús Melendez Ortega was born in Douglas, Arizona on May 12, 1922, the son of Juana (née Melendez) and Thomas Ortega. Ortega later served with the 160th Infantry Regiment during World War II rising to the rank to staff sergeant. In January 1945, Ortega was wounded by artillery fire which required operations on his arm and thorax.

== Professional wrestling career ==
Ortega would make his professional wrestling debut in 1952. He would work in various territories in the States as Jesse Ortega. In 1954 he began wrestling in Toronto, Canada for Maple Leaf Wrestling and Stampede Wrestling in Calgary in 1955.

In 1959 he won the NWA International Tag Team Championship (Calgary version) with Shag Thomas and the NWA International Tag Team Championship (Calgary version) with Thomas and Tarzan Tyler in 1960. Ortega had a lot of success in Stampede, which was the promotion he worked for longest.

Also in 1959, Ortega worked for Japan's Japan Pro Wrestling Alliance where he appeared in the Grand Finals where he lost to Rikidozan in the 1st Annual World League.

Ortega and Ed Miller were the very last NWA World Tag Team champions in San Francisco when the promotion folded in 1961.

Ortega continued working in Canada in Toronto, Vancouver, and in Calgary until leaving in 1966.

He would make his debut in the World Wide Wrestling Federation in 1966 as Bull Ortega and sometimes using the name Mighty Ursus. He would have a feud with WWWF Champion Bruno Sammartino in late 1966 and early 1967. On November 9, 1966, Morgan fought Bruno Sammartino in 17:00 minutes in Baltimore in which Sammartino retained the title. He also feuded with Louis Cerdan, Ox Baker, Bobo Brazil, Tony Parisi, and Gorilla Monsoon. Ortega left the WWWF by the end of 1967 and went to Japan.

In 1968, Ortega made his debut in for Big Time Wrestling in Detroit.

Ortega returned to the WWWF in 1969 for a few matches and left.

In 1970, he returned to Calgary for Stampede.

Ortega's last known matches were in Calgary in 1975.

== Death ==
On July 28, 1977, Ortega died from a heart attack.

== Championships and accomplishments ==
- NWA San Francisco
  - NWA Pacific Coast Tag Team Championship (San Francisco version) (1 time) - with Enrique Torres
  - San Joaquin Valley Tag Team Championship (2 times) - with Enrique Torres (1) and Vic Christy (1)
  - NWA World Tag Team Championship (San Francisco version) (2 times) - with Ed Miller (2)
- Stampede Wrestling
  - NWA Canadian Tag Team Championship (Calgary version) (1 time) - with Shag Thomas
  - NWA International Tag Team Championship (Calgary version) (2 times) - with Shag Thomas and Tarzan Tyler
- Pacific Northwest Wrestling
  - NWA Pacific Northwest Tag Team Championship (2 times) - with Stan Stasiak (1) and Enrique Torres (1)
- Western States Sports
  - NWA World Tag Team Championship (Amarillo version) (1 time) - with Alex Perez
