= Ramón Torres (wrestler) =

American professional wrestler (1932–2000)

Personal information
- Born: Ramón S. Torres; January 13, 1932 Santa Ana, California, U.S.
- Died: August 25, 2000 (aged 68)

Professional wrestling career
- Ring name(s): Ramón Torres; Avenger #2; Raymond Torres; Ray Torres
- Billed height: 5 ft 11 in (1.80 m)
- Billed weight: 242 lb (110 kg)
- Billed from: Sonora, Mexico
- Trained by: Enrique Torres
- Debut: 1952

Ramón S. Torres (January 13, 1932 – August 25, 2000) was an American professional wrestler. Primarily a babyface throughout his career, he was a part of 'The Famous Torres Brothers' with Alberto & Enrique Torres and was a major star in the 1950s and 60s as a both a tag team and singles competitor. He wrestled primarily within the National Wrestling Alliance, where he was a multi-time NWA World Tag Team Champion and NWA World Junior Heavyweight Champion and also wrestled in the American Wrestling Association (where he held the AWA Midwest Heavyweight Championship) and Worldwide Wrestling Associates.

== Early life ==
Before entering professional wrestling, Ramón Torres' older brother Enrique was already a World Heavyweight Champion and established star in the world of wrestling. Ramón and his brother Alberto had aspirations of stardom themselves and wanted Enrique to help them break into the business. Enrique agreed to help them, with the condition that they learn the amateur style first and become competent shoot wrestlers. "I told both of them to join a wrestling team. They joined a wrestling team in San Francisco, at the YMCA and other places. Join a wrestling team and learn how to wrestle" Enrique stated. After competing as amateurs, Enrique agreed to them becoming pros.

== Professional wrestling career ==
Ramón began his career in his native California and did not take long to establish himself in the territory. He captured the NWA Pacific Coast Tag Team Championship with Enrique on September 19, 1953 in San Francisco. In an era before the likes of Gorgeous George the Torres trio stood out for their charisma and mat skills. Ramón also held the NWA World Tag Team Championship with Tex McKenzie when the duo defeated Mike and Ben Sharpe on September 21, 1957. Ramón was to become a major fan favourite throughout the California territories, winning the NWA Pacific Coast Heavyweight Championship on five occasions.

Ramón and his brothers became the top babyface team in numerous territories throughout the NWA, including Florida, where they had noted rivalries with the Von Brauners and Keomuka & Matsuda. The brothers continued to travel throughout North America, winning tag team gold from the Georgia and Tri-State territories in the American South to the Stampede Wrestling territory in Calgary.

On September 10, 1971, Ramón defeated Roger Kirby to capture the NWA World Junior Heavyweight Championship in Monroe, Louisiana. As was customary for the world champions of the NWA, Torres defended the title in various territories as a travelling champion, eventually losing the title in Oklahoma City, Oklahoma. That same year, he also competed in the American Wrestling Association, winning the AWA Midwest Heavyweight Championship in August, 1971.

== Championships and accomplishments ==
- American Wrestling Association
  - AWA Midwest Heavyweight Championship (1 time)
- Championship Wrestling from Florida
  - NWA World Tag Team Championship (Florida version) (1 time)
- Georgia Championship Wrestling
  - NWA Georgia Tag Team Championship (2 times)
  - NWA Southern Tag Team Championship (Georgia version) (6 times)
  - NWA World Tag Team Championship (Georgia version) (3 times)
- Gulf Coast Championship Wrestling
  - NWA Southern Tag Team Championship (2 times)
  - NWA Gulf Coast Heavyweight Championship (6 times)
- National Wrestling Alliance
  - NWA World Junior Heavyweight Championship (1 time)
- NWA San Francisco
  - NWA (San Francisco) Pacific Coast Heavyweight Championship (5 times)
  - NWA (San Francisco) Pacific Coast Tag Team Championship (6 times)
  - NWA World Tag Team Championship (San Francisco version) (6 times)
- NWA Tri-State
  - NWA United States Tag Team Championship (3 times)
- Stampede Wrestling
  - Stampede Wrestling International Tag Team Championship (1 time)
- Worldwide Wrestling Associates
  - WWA World Tag Team Championship (1 time)
  - WWA International Television Tag Team Championship (1 time)
