= Bob Merrill (wrestler) =

American professional wrestler

Personal information
- Born: Robert Merrill United States

Professional wrestling career
- Ring name(s): Rip Carlson; Bob Stanlee; Golden Terror; Rip Miller; Giant Evans; Big Ed Miller; Mighty Joe Thunder
- Billed height: 6 ft 6 in (1.98 m)
- Billed weight: 286 lb (130 kg)
- Debut: 1957
- Retired: 1982

Bob Merrill was an American professional wrestler. He used a number of ring names over his career, including Bob Stanlee, Rip Miller, The Golden Terror, Giant Evans, and Mighty Joe Thunder.

== Career ==
Merrill made his professional wrestling debut in 1957 as Rip Carlson after training with Stu Hart in Calgary. Shortly after he teamed with Dr. Bill Miller as his storyline brother Big Ed Miller. After a 3-year stay in Calgary he left for the Detroit territory where he challenged the likes of Antonino Rocca.

His longest stay was in Championship Wrestling from Florida (CWF). He teamed with Moose Evans (as Giant Evans) to form The Mighty Yankees and they captured the NWA Southern Tag Team championship and then, as The Masked Yankees, the NWA International Tag Team Championship. He stayed in the territory for almost four years before moving to Detroit under the name Bob Stanlee, where he wrestled with real life brothers Steve Stanlee and Gene Stanlee, before moving on again to Toronto for promoter Frank Tunney.

In April 1964 he entered the World Wide Wrestling Federation (WWWF). He stayed for nearly two years wrestling as the masked Golden Terror challenging then champion Bruno Sammartino for the WWWF World Heavyweight title.

He then entered the Worldwide Wrestling Associates, again as the Golden Terror, and stayed for about a year. Then he headed north to Roy Shire's San Francisco NWA territory as Rip Miller. He teamed with Enrique Torres to win the NWA World Tag Team Championship.

He returned to the WWWF in 1968 staying for about a year before returning briefly to Toronto and then leaving wrestling for many years. In 1982, after 14 years away from the business, Merrill returned to the WWF as Mighty Joe Thunder, managed by Captain Lou Albano. After appearing at several television tapings and house shows, he retired from wrestling.

He is deceased.

== Championships and accomplishments ==
- Championship Wrestling from Florida
  - NWA Southern Tag Team Championship (Florida version) (1 time) - with Moose Evans
- Maple Leaf Wrestling
  - NWA International Tag Team Championship (Toronto version) (1 time) - with Moose Evans
- NWA Mid-America
  - NWA World Tag Team Championship (Mid-America version) (1 time) - with Moose Evans
- NWA San Francisco
  - NWA World Tag Team Championship (San Francisco version) (1 times) - with Enrique Torres
