= Joe Malcewicz =

American professional wrestler

Personal information
- Born: Joseph Malcewicz; March 17, 1897 Utica, New York, U.S.
- Died: April 20, 1962 (aged 65) San Francisco, California, U.S.
- Cause of death: Heart attack

Professional wrestling career
- Ring name: Joe Malcewicz
- Billed height: 5 ft 11 in (180 cm)
- Billed weight: 210 lb (95 kg)
- Billed from: Utica, New York
- Trained by: Farmer Burns; Herbert Hartley
- Debut: 1913
- Retired: 1938

Joseph Malcewicz (March 17, 1897 – April 20, 1962) was an American professional wrestler and a promoter. He is an overall three-time world champion under different incarnations and recognitions.

Nicknamed the "Utica Panther", Malcewicz is acknowledged for his contributions to professional wrestling in San Francisco, during his time as a promoter of NWA San Francisco. Malcewicz is a charter member of the Professional Wrestling Hall of Fame.

== Early life ==
Malcewicz was born to Polish immigrants, being the oldest of five children. While being a teenager, Malcewicz played football at Utica Free Academy and for the Utica Knights of Columbus.

== Professional wrestling career ==
Malcewicz began his training with Farmer Burns and Herbert Hartley, before entering the professional wrestling ranks in 1913. Malcewicz earliest recorded match was against Charles Uberle on February 2, 1914, which ended in a draw. On 1917, during the World War I, Malcewicz was drafted to the military when he served at Camp Jackson, reaching to the level of sergeant upon his return to wrestling. On 1926, Malcewicz was a last-minute challenger for Joe Stecher's World Heavyweight Wrestling Championship. When Stecher left the match as a sign of protest, Malcewicz was named as the title holder, however, was never awarded the championship itself.

As a promoter, Malcewicz managed to promote wrestling at San Francisco, while running NWA San Francisco. In November 1935, Malcewicz replaced Jack Ganson as the leaseholder of New Dreamland Auditorium, after buying Ganson's interest for $15,000 after Paul Bowser and Toots Mondt convinced him to step aside. Malcewicz held is first show on November 26, 1935. On November 26, 1949, Malcewicz joined the newly-formed National Wrestling Alliance (NWA). During his time with NWA, Malcewicz created the NWA World Tag Team Championship (San Francisco version) and the second regional NWA World Tag Team Championship.

On April 20, 1962, Malcewicz died after he suffered a fatal Heart attack.

== Championships and accomplishments ==
- Professional Wrestling Hall of Fame
  - Class of 2015
