= Louie Tillet =

French professional wrestler (1934–2024)

Personal information
- Born: Maurice Joseph Michaud; July 23, 1934 Bordeaux, France
- Died: June 26, 2024 (aged 89) Highlands, North Carolina, U.S.

Professional wrestling career
- Ring name(s): Louie Tillet; Louie Tillett; Louis Tillet; King Louis Tillet; The Rock; The Gladiator; Masked Gladiator; Gladiator #1; Joe "Flash" Gordon; Joe Fargo; Joey Fargo; Karl Von Stroheim
- Billed height: 5 ft 9 in (1.75 m)
- Billed from: France
- Debut: 1956
- Retired: 1982

Maurice Joseph Michaud (July 23, 1934 – June 26, 2024) was a French professional wrestler who under the ring name Louie Tillet. Worked mainly for Championship Wrestling from Florida, World Class Championship Wrestling and National Wrestling Alliance (NWA) territories.

== Professional wrestling career ==
Tillet made his pro wrestling debut in 1956 in Minnesota. In 1961, he teamed up with Jackie Fargo as the Fabulous Fargos in Alabama. Tillet was known as Joey Fargo. Sometimes he teamed with Sonny Fargo. Joey and Jackie won the NWA Gulf Coast Tag Team Championship. In 1962, Tillet went to NWA Tri-State.

Tillet made his debut in Texas in 1963 where he became a two time NWA Texas Junior Heavyweight Champion and a three time WCWA Brass Knuckles Champion.

In 1965, Tillet debuted in Florida where he worked there for many years. In 1967 he was their Florida Heavyweight Champion when he defeated Lester Welch for the title. He dropped the title to Wahoo McDaniel. He left Florida in 1974 and went to Los Angeles.

In Los Angeles, Tillet both won the NWA Americas Heavyweight Championship and Beat the Champ Television Championship in 1975.

Tillet would debut for Continental Championship Wrestling in Knoxville, Tennessee in 1976 where spent the rest of his career there. In 1978, he would returned to Florida and left in 1979.

In 1982, he retired from wrestling.

== Personal life ==
Tillet died on June 26, 2024, aged 89.

== Championships and accomplishments ==
- Championship Wrestling from Florida
  - NWA Florida Heavyweight Championship (1 time)
  - NWA Southern Tag Team Championship (Florida version) (2 times) – with Tarzan Tyler
- Georgia Championship Wrestling
  - NWA Georgia Heavyweight Championship (1 time)
  - NWA Southern Heavyweight Championship (Georgia version) (1 time)
  - NWA World Tag Team Championship (Georgia version) 1 time – with Al Costello
- Gulf Coast Championship Wrestling
  - NWA Gulf Coast Tag Team Championship with Jackie Fargo (1)
- Mid-South Sports

- NWA Southern Tag Team Championship (Georgia version) (2 times) - with Paul Vachon (2)

- National Wrestling Alliance
  - NWA Texas Junior Heavyweight Championship (2 times)
- NWA Hollywood Wrestling
  - NWA Americas Heavyweight Championship (1 time)
  - NWA "Beat the Champ" Television Championship (1 time)
  - NWA Americas Tag Team Championship (1 times) - with John Tolos (1)
- Southeastern Championship Wrestling
  - NWA Southeast United States Junior Heavyweight Championship (3 times)
- World Class Championship Wrestling
  - WCWA Brass Knuckles Championship (3 times)
