= Alberto Torres (wrestler) =

American professional wrestler (1934-1971)

Personal information
- Born: Alberto Torres; January 2, 1934 California, U.S.
- Died: June 16, 1971 (aged 37)

Professional wrestling career
- Ring name(s): Alberto Torres; Al Torres
- Billed weight: 228 lb (103 kg)
- Billed from: Sonora, Mexico
- Trained by: Enrique Torres
- Debut: 1957

Alberto Torres (January 2, 1934 – June 16, 1971) was an American professional wrestler. Primarily a babyface throughout his career, he was a part of 'The Famous Torres Brothers' with Ramon & Enrique Torres in the 1950s and 60s as a both a tag team and singles competitor. He wrestled primarily within the National Wrestling Alliance and California, where he was a multi-time NWA World Tag Team Champion, NWA United States Tag Team Championship and the NWA Southern Tag Team Championship (Georgia version).

== Early life ==
Before entering professional wrestling, Alberto Torres' older brother Enrique was already a World Heavyweight Champion and an established star in the world of wrestling. Alberto and his brother Ramon had aspirations of stardom themselves and wanted Enrique to help them break into the business. Enrique agreed to help them, with the condition that they learn the amateur style first and become competent shoot wrestlers. "I told both of them to join a wrestling team. They joined a wrestling team in San Francisco, at the YMCA and other places. Join a wrestling team and learn how to wrestle" Enrique stated. After competing as amateurs, Enrique agreed to them becoming pros.

== Professional wrestling career ==
Ramón began his career in his native California and did not take long to establish himself in the territory.

Ramón and his brothers became the top babyface team in numerous territories throughout the NWA, including Florida, where they had noted rivalries with the Von Brauners and Keomuka & Matsuda. The brothers continued to travel throughout North America, winning tag team gold from the Georgia and Tri-State territories in the American South to the Stampede Wrestling territory in Calgary.

Enrique and Alberto wrestled a headliner match in Havana, Cuba the night that the Batista regime fell to Castro's rebel army in 1959 and returned to the US with the help of his Promoter, Benny Ginsberg and his Meyer Lansky connections in Cuba.

The three went on to be involved in a 'Vachon-Torres Brother War' in Georgia against the Vachon wrestling family in 1967.

== Death ==
On June 13, 1971, Alberto and his partner “Cowboy” Bob Ellis were wrestling in an AWA Midwest Tag Team Championship tag team match against Ox Baker and The Claw in Verdigre, Nebraska. Alberto died on June 16 with the cause determined to be a result of heart disease and of a ruptured pancreas and other internal injuries. This was worked into an angle in which Baker's Heart Punch was blamed to reinforce Baker's wrestling heel persona.

== Championships and accomplishments ==
- 50th State Big Time Wrestling
  - NWA Hawaii Tag Team Championship (1 time) - with Alberto Torres
- American Wrestling Association
  - AWA Midwest Tag Team Championship (1 time) – with Cowboy Bob Ellis
- Championship Wrestling from Florida
  - NWA World Tag Team Championship (Florida version) (1 time)
- Georgia Championship Wrestling
  - NWA Georgia Tag Team Championship (4 times)
  - NWA Southern Tag Team Championship (Georgia version) (6 times)
  - NWA World Tag Team Championship (Georgia version) (3 times)
  - NWA Macon Tag Team Championship - with Bill Dromo (1 time)
- Gulf Coast Championship Wrestling
  - NWA Southern Tag Team Championship (2 times)
- NWA Rocky Mountain
  - NWA Rocky Mountain Heavyweight Championship (1 time)
- NWA San Francisco
  - NWA (San Francisco) Pacific Coast Tag Team Championship (6 times)
  - NWA World Tag Team Championship (San Francisco version) (6 times)
- NWA Tri-State
  - NWA United States Tag Team Championship (5 times)
- Stampede Wrestling
  - Stampede Wrestling International Tag Team Championship (1 time)
- NWA Southwest Sports, Inc.
  - NWA Texas Tag Team Championship (2 time) - with Enqiue Torres (1) and Ramon Torres (1)
- Worldwide Wrestling Associates
  - WWA World Tag Team Championship (3 times) with - Ramon Torries (2) and Thunderbolt Patterson (1)
  - WWA International Television Tag Team Championship (1 time)

== See also ==
- List of premature professional wrestling deaths
