= Ray Stern =

American professional wrestler and bodybuilder (1933–2007)

Personal information
- Born: Walter Bookbinder; January 12, 1933 Brooklyn, New York, U.S.
- Died: March 6, 2007 (aged 74) Dallas, Texas, U.S.

Professional wrestling career
- Ring name: Ray Stern
- Trained by: The Dusek Family
- Debut: 1950
- Retired: 1966

Ray "Thunder" Stern, born Walter Bookbinder, (January 12, 1933 – March 6, 2007) was an American professional wrestler, bodybuilder and entrepreneur.

== Biography ==
At age 13 he joined the Merchant Marines using the name Paul Davis and discovered bodybuilding, a sport he loved so much he would carry a pair of 50 pound dumbbells in his duffel bag for workouts. In 1950 Stern began wrestling at age 17 in New York City working for Rudy Dusek. Due to his penchant for aerial moves promoters nicknamed him "Thunder".

Stern opened the first co-ed gym in the United States in San Francisco, California, as well as the first with a nursery. He also worked with real estate and rental properties.

Stern was also an avid flier, and during his wrestling career this allowed him to travel great distances in short periods to conduct more business and matches in a quicker span. He founded Stern Air in Addison, Texas, with a fleet of Lear Jets and Falcon's. He even flew to Czechoslovakia to train with their national aerobatic champions, and was so successful that the team named him as an official backup member at the world level.

In 1994 Stern published his autobiography, Power and Thunder: The Rags to Riches Story of One Man's Adventure of Fame, Fortune, Romance & Fitness. He was also awarded the Iron Mike Mazurki Award in 2000 at that year's Cauliflower Alley Club reunion, an award that recognizes wrestlers for success outside the industry.

In 2005 he received the New York State Award (since renamed the Senator Hugh Farley Award) from the Professional Wrestling Hall of Fame and Museum in Amsterdam, New York.

On March 6, 2007, Stern died after complications from heart surgery at the age of 74.

== Championships and accomplishments ==
- Cauliflower Alley Club
  - Iron Mike Mazurki Award (2000)
- Midwest Wrestling Association (Ohio)
  - MWA American Tag Team Championship (1 time) – with Don Leo Jonathan
- NWA San Francisco
  - NWA World Tag Team Championship (San Francisco version) (1 time) – with Ron Etchison
- Professional Wrestling Hall of Fame and Museum
  - Class of 2005 (New York State Award)
- Worldwide Wrestling Associates
  - WWA International Television Tag Team Championship (1 time) - with Rito Romero

== See also ==
- List of Jewish professional wrestlers
