= Steven Stanley (disambiguation) =

Steven Stanley (born 1958) is a Jamaican audio engineer and producer.

Steven Stanley is also the name of:

- Steven M. Stanley (born 1941), American paleontologist and evolutionary biologist

== See also ==
- Stephen Stanley, Canadian singer-songwriter
- Steve Stanlee (1920–2010), American professional wrestler
