= NWA Southern Tag Team Championship =

The NWA Southern Tag Team Championship is the name of multiple groups of tag team professional wrestling championship titles in the National Wrestling Alliance.

Specific titles include:

- The NWA Southern Tag Team Championship (Florida version)
- The NWA Southern Tag Team Championship (Georgia version)
- The NWA Southern Tag Team Championship (Knoxville version)
- The NWA Southern Tag Team Championship (Mid-America version)
- The NWA Southern Tag Team Championship (Mid-Atlantic version)
