= Lars Anderson (wrestler) =

American retired professional wrestler

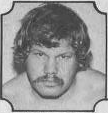
- Anderson in a 1978 publication

Personal information
- Born: Larry Heiniemi; March 14, 1939 (age 87) Bovey, Minnesota, U.S.
- Education: St. Cloud State University

Professional wrestling career
- Ring name(s): Lars Anderson; Lucious Lars
- Billed height: 6 ft 3 in (191 cm)
- Billed weight: 235 lb (107 kg)
- Trained by: Verne Gagne; Eddie Sharkey
- Debut: August 1965
- Retired: 1986

Larry Heiniemi (born March 14, 1939) is an American retired professional wrestler, better known by his ring name, Lars Anderson. His career spans over a decade of performing in National Wrestling Alliance (NWA) territories as well as the American Wrestling Association (AWA).

== Professional wrestling career ==
Heiniemi started wrestling in 1965. He formed a tag team with his kayfabe brother Gene Anderson and also tagged with his other kayfabe brother Ole Anderson. Ole and Lars had adopted Anderson as their family names to pretend to be brothers of Gene. He occasionally wrestled with them as the Minnesota Wrecking Crew. Lars did not have the success that the other Andersons had. He did win numerous NWA regional championships, including winning the Georgia version of the NWA World Tag Team Championship with Gene Anderson. Lars wrestled briefly in the Carolinas as "Luscious Lars" Anderson.

In the early 1970s, he wrestled in the San Francisco bay area (again as "Luscious Lars" Anderson), winning the NWA (San Francisco) World Tag Team title with partner Paul DeMarco in 1972.

On the microphone, Larry was one of the best talkers in an era when getting over on the microphone was important. In the early '70s, after leaving Gene Anderson, he returned to the AWA and hooked up with "Pretty Boy" Larry Hennig. The latter needed a new partner after the departure of "Handsome Harley" Race who ventured to the NWA.

In the mid 1970s, Heiniemi was joined by his college friend, Les "Budd" Wolfe. Together they formed a solid combination, and many felt they should have won the AWA World Tag Team titles. In March 1975, Heiniemi announced he was retiring from the ring, and after losing his last match to England's Billy Robinson, Larry left the AWA.

However in 1977, he was back to using the Lars Anderson handle and briefly feuded with his kayfabe brothers Gene and Ole in Atlanta in 1977.

He spent the last years of his career wrestling in Hawaii for Polynesian Pacific Wrestling (PPW). When its owner, Peter Maivia, died in 1982, his wife hired Heiniemi as head booker. This lasted until 1988 when the dwindling promotion folded. Dwayne Johnson, former wrestler and grandson of Peter Maivia, spoke of Heiniemi in his 2000 autobiography, The Rock Says.... Johnson described a scene where, as a teenager, he angrily confronted Heiniemi when he refused to drop the Polynesian Pacific Heavyweight title to Bad News Allen.

In 1996, Heiniemi established World League Wrestling. This little known promotion consisted largely of wrestlers from his training school and former PPW talent. The promotion officially folded in 2000.

== Championships and accomplishments ==
- American Wrestling Association
  - AWA Midwest Tag Team Championship (1 time) - with Larry Hennig
  - AWA Midwest Heavyweight Championship (2 times)
- American Wrestling Federation
  - AWF Heavyweight Championship (1 time)
- Championship Wrestling from Florida
  - NWA Florida Heavyweight Championship (2 times)
  - NWA Florida Southern Tag Team Championship (2 times) - with Gene Anderson
- Georgia Championship Wrestling
  - NWA Georgia Tag Team Championship (2 times) - with Ole Anderson
  - NWA World Tag Team Championship (Georgia Version) (1 time) - with Gene Anderson
- National Wrestling Alliance
  - NWA Hall of Fame (class of 2010)
- NWA Polynesian Wrestling
  - NWA Polynesian Pacific Heavyweight Championship (5 times)
  - NWA Polynesian Pacific Tag Team Championship (1 time) - with Seiji Sakaguchi
- NWA San Francisco
  - NWA World Tag Team Championship (San Francisco Version) (1 time) - with Paul DeMarco (wrestler)
- World Championship Wrestling
  - IWA World Tag Team Championship (1 time) - with Dick Murdoch
- Other titles-
- New Brand Wrestling
  - New Brand Tag Team Championship ( 1 time ) - with Butcher
