= NWA World Tag Team Championship (Georgia version) =

Professional wrestling tag team championship

Details
- Promotion: ABC Booking
- Date established: May 1954
- Date retired: 1969
Statistics
- First champions: Reggie Lisowski and Art Neilson
- Most reigns: Team: The Von Brauners/Enrique and Alberto Torres (3 reigns); Individual: Enrique Torres (5 reigns)
- Longest reign: Eddie Gosset and Art Neilson (At least 434 days)
- Shortest reign: Paul and Stan Vachon (9 days)

Between May 1955 and 1969 the professional wrestling promotion ABC Booking (later known as Georgia Championship Wrestling; GCW) promoted their own regional version of the NWA World Tag Team Championship, a professional wrestling championship for teams of two wrestlers. When the National Wrestling Alliance (NWA) was founded in 1948, its board of directors decided to allow any NWA member, referred to as an NWA territory, to use an NWA World Tag Team Championship within their region, essentially making it a regional championship despite the "World" label applied to it. Since the NWA World Tag Team Championships were professional wrestling championships, they were not won or lost in legitimate competitive matches but decided by booker(s) of a wrestling promotion instead.

The Georgia version of the NWA World Tag Team championship existed for 16 years. The fact that the board of directors did not put any limits on who could bill a championship as the NWA World Tag Team Championship led to at least 13 different championships of that name being used across the United States simultaneously at one point in 1957.^{[Championships]} Enrique Torres and Art Neilson are tied for the most championship reigns, 5 each with various partners, while the team of Enrique and his brother Ramon Torres and the team of The Von Brauners (Kurt and Karl) hold the record for reigns as a team, three each. Art Neilson and Eddie Gosset's second reign lasted at least 434 days, the longest reign in the championship's history.

The first recognized NWA World Tag Team Champions were the team of Reggie Lisowski and Art Neilson. At the time Lisowski and Neilson held the Chicago version of the championship which was brought to the Georgia territory. The Chicago version was used as the starting point of the Georgia lineage, creating a totally separate championship when Bill and Freddie Blassie won the Georgia version in December 1955, while Lisowski and Neilson remained champions in the Chicago region. In 1969 ABC Booking stopped using the championship, although they would recognize the Mid-Atlantic version after 1975. Instead the promotion would regularly promote the NWA Georgia Tag Team Championship and the NWA National Tag Team Championship as their primary championships.

== Title history ==
Key
No.	Overall reign number
Reign	Reign number for the specific champion
Days	Number of days held

No.	Champion	Championship change			Reign statistics		Notes	Ref.
No.	Champion	Date	Event	Location	Reign	Days	Notes	Ref.
1	Reggie Lisowski and Art Neilson	May 1954	GCW show	Georgia	1	(Note: The exact date that the championship was won and lost is undocumented, which means that the championship reign lasted between 184 and 190 days.)	Defended Chicago version in Georgia to establish Georgia version	
2	Bill and Fred Blassie	December 1955	GCW show	Georgia	1	(Note: The exact date that the championship was won is undocumented, which means that the championship reign lasted between 1 day and 8 days.)		
3	Jerry Graham and Don McIntyre	December 9, 1955	GCW show	Atlanta, Georgia	1	(Note: The exact date that the championship was lost is undocumented, which means that the championship reign lasted between 1 day and 22 days.)		
4	Bill and Fred Blassie	December 1955	GCW show	Atlanta, Georgia	2	(Note: The exact date that the championship was won is undocumented, which means that the championship reign lasted between 7 and 28 days.)		
5	Roger Mackay and Jackie Nichols	January 6, 1956	GCW show	Atlanta, Georgia	1	77		
6	Jack O'Brien and Pierre LaSalle	March 23, 1956	GCW show	Atlanta, Georgia	1	(Note: The exact date that the championship was lost is undocumented, which means that the championship reign lasted between 100 and 129 days.)		
7	Eddie Gosset and Art Neilson	July 1956	GCW show	Georgia	1	(Note: The exact date that the championship was won and lost is undocumented, which means that the championship reign lasted between 1 day and 53 days.)		
8	Don (2) and Red McIntyre	August 1956	GCW show	Georgia	1	(Note: The exact date that the championship was won is undocumented, which means that the championship reign lasted between 1 day and 24 days.)		
9	Eddie Gosset and Art Neilson	August 24, 1956	GCW show	Atlanta, Georgia	2	(Note: The exact date that the championship was lost is undocumented, which means that the championship reign lasted between 434 and 463 days.)		
10	Reggie (2) and Stan Lisowski	November 1957	GCW show	Georgia	1	(Note: The exact date that the championship was won and lost is undocumented, which means that the championship reign lasted between 244 and 303 days.)	Records unclear if this truly was the Georgia version of the championship	
11	Jackie and Don Fargo	August 1958	GCW show	Georgia	1	(Note: The length of the championship reign is too uncertain to calculate.)	Records are unclear as to when they lost titles	
Championship history is unrecorded from August 1958 to June 1962.
12	Joe Scarpa and Don Curtis	June 1962	GCW show	Georgia	1	(Note: The exact date that the championship was won is undocumented, which means that the championship reign lasted between 14 and 34 days.)	Defended the Florida version in Georgia to restart the Georgia version of the championship	
13	The Assassins (Assassin #1 and Assassin #2)	July 5, 1962	GCW show	Jacksonville, Florida	1	(Note: The exact date that the championship was lost is undocumented, which means that the championship reign lasted between 27 and 57 days.)		
14	The Von Brauners (Kurt and Karl Von Brauner)	August 1963	GCW show	Georgia	1	(Note: The exact date that the championship was won and lost is undocumented, which means that the championship reign lasted between 1 day and 70 days.)		
15	Lenny Montana and Tarzan Tyler	1963	GCW show	Georgia	1	(Note: The exact date that the championship was won and lost is undocumented, which means that the championship reign lasted between 1 day and 70 days.)		
16	Chief Big Heart and Chief Little Eagle	October 11, 1963	GCW show	Atlanta, Georgia	1			
Championship history is unrecorded from October 11, 1963 to May 1964.
17	The Von Brauners (Kurt and Karl Von Brauner)	May 1964	GCW show	Georgia	2	(Note: The exact date that the championship was won is undocumented, which means that the championship reign lasted between 5 and 34 days.)	Records are unclear as to whom they defeated	
18	Ray Gunkel and Lester Welch	June 4, 1965	GCW show	Atlanta, Georgia	1			
—	Vacated	1966	—	—	—	—	Championship vacated for undocumented reasons	
19	The Globetrotters (Al Costello and Louie Tillet)	February 4, 1966	GCW show	Atlanta, Georgia	1	7	Defeated the Mysterious Medics to win the vacant championship	
20	The Von Brauners (Kurt and Karl Von Brauner)	February 11, 1966	GCW show	Atlanta, Georgia	3	42		
21	The Mysterious Medics (Mysterious Medic #1 and Mysterious Medic #2)	March 25, 1966	GCW show	Atlanta, Georgia	1	77		
22	The Infernos (Inferno #1 and Inferno #2)	June 10, 1966	GCW show	Atlanta, Georgia	1	7		
23	Enrique and Alberto Torres	June 17, 1966	GCW show	Atlanta, Georgia	1	(Note: The exact date that the championship was lost is undocumented, which means that the championship reign lasted between 1 day and 13 days.)		
24	The Infernos (Inferno #1 and Inferno #2)	June 1966	GCW show	Georgia	2	(Note: The exact date that the championship was won is undocumented, which means that the championship reign lasted between 50 and 79 days.)		
25	Enrique and Alberto Torres	August 19, 1966	GCW show	Atlanta, Georgia	2	(Note: The exact date that the championship was lost is undocumented, which means that the championship reign lasted between 43 and 42 days.)		
26	Enrique (3) and Ramon Torres	October 1966	N/A	N/A	1	(Note: The exact date that the championship was won is undocumented, which means that the championship reign lasted between 74 and 104 days.)	Alberto lost a loser leaves town match to Butcher Vachon on October 7, 1966 with Ramon replacing him as championship at some point afterwards.	
27	Maurice and Paul Vachon	January 13, 1967	GCW show	Atlanta, Georgia	1	21		
28	Enrique (4) and Ramon Torres	February 3, 1967	GCW show	Atlanta, Georgia	2	84		
29	The Minnesota Wrecking Crew (Gene and Lars Anderson)	April 28, 1967	GCW show	Atlanta, Georgia	1	(Note: The exact date that the championship was vacated is undocumented, which means that the championship reign lasted between 1 day and 216 days.)		
—	Vacated	1967	—	—	—	—	Championship vacated for undocumented reasons	
30	Enrique (5) and Ramon Torres	November 1967	GCW show	Georgia	3	(Note: The exact date that the championship was won is undocumented, which means that the championship reign lasted between 79 and 50 days.)		
31	Paul and Stan Vachon	January 19, 1968	GCW show	Atlanta, Georgia	1	0		
32	Buddy Fuller and Ray Gunkel (2)	January 19, 1968	GCW show	Atlanta, Georgia	1	336		
33	The Assassins (Assassin #1 and Assassin #2)	December 20, 1968	GCW show	Atlanta, Georgia	2	70		
—	Vacated	February 28, 1969	—	—	—	—	Championship held up after match with Ray Gunkel and Buddy Fuller	
34	Buddy Fuller and Ray Gunkel (3)	March 28, 1969	GCW show	Atlanta, Georgia	2	(Note: The exact date that the championship was abandoned is undocumented, which means that the championship reign lasted between 1 day and 278 days.)	Won the rematch.	
—	Deactivated	1969	—	—	—	—	The Championship was abandoned	

== Team reigns by combined length ==
Key

Symbol	Meaning
¤	The exact length of at least one title reign is uncertain, so the shortest possible length is used.

Rank	Team	No. of reigns	Combined days
1	Eddie Gosset and Art Neilson	2	435¤
2	Buddy Fuller and Ray Gunkel	2	337¤
3	Reggie and Stan Lisowski	1	244¤
4	Enrique and Ramon Torres	3	237¤
5	Reggie Lisowski and Art Neilson	1	184¤
6	Jack O'Brien and Pierre LaSalle	1	100¤
7	The Assassins (Assassin #1 and Assassin #2)	2	97¤
8	The Mysterious Medics (Mysterious Medic #1 and Mysterious Medic #2)	1	77
8	Roger Mackay and Jackie Nichols	1	77
10	The Infernos (Inferno #1 and Inferno #2)	2	57¤
11	The Von Brauners (Kurt and Karl Von Brauner)	3	48¤
12	Enrique and Alberto Torres	2	44¤
13	Maurice and Paul Vachon	1	21
14	Joe Scarpa and Don Curtis	1	14¤
15	Bill and Fred Blassie	2	8¤
16	The Globetrotters (Al Costello and Louie Tillet)	1	7
17	Don and Red McIntyre	1	1¤
17	Lenny Montana and Tarzan Tyler	1	1¤
17	Jerry Graham and Don McIntyre	1	1¤
20	Paul and Stan Vachon	1	0
21	Jackie and Don Fargo	1	¤
21	Ray Gunkel and Lester Welch	1	¤
21	Chief Big Heart and Chief Little Eagle	1	¤

== Individual reigns by combined length ==
Key

Symbol	Meaning
¤	The exact length of at least one title reign is uncertain, so the shortest possible length is used.

Rank	Wrestler	No. of reigns	Combined days
1	Art Neilson	5	619¤
2	Buddy Fuller	2	337¤
2	Ray Gunkel	3	337¤
4	Enrique Torres	5	281¤
5	Lisowski|Reggie Lisowski	1	244¤
5	Stan Lisowski	1	244¤
7	Ramon Torres	3	237¤
8	Reggie Lisowski	1	244¤
9	Pierre LaSalle	1	100¤
9	Jack O'Brien	1	100¤
11	Assassin #1	2	97¤
11	Assassin #2	2	97¤
13	Jackie Nichols	1	77
13	Roger Mackay	1	77
13	Mysterious Medic #1	1	77
13	Mysterious Medic #2	1	77
17	Inferno #1	2	57¤
17	Inferno #2	2	57¤
19	Karl Von Brauner	3	48¤
19	Kurt Von Brauner	3	48¤
21	Alberto Torres	2	44¤
22	Maurice Vachon	1	21
22	Paul Vachon	2	21
22	Don Curtis	1	21
25	Joe Scarpa	1	14¤
26	Bill Blassie	2	8¤
26	Fred Blassie	2	8¤
28	Louie Tillet	1	7
28	Al Costello	1	7
30	Don, McIntyre	1	1¤
30	Lenny Montana	1	1¤
30	Don McIntyre	1	1¤
30	Red McIntyre	1	1¤
30	Jerry Graham	1	1¤
30	Tarzan Tyler	1	1¤
36	Stan Vachon	1	0
37	Don Fargo	1	¤
37	Jackie Fargo	1	¤
37	Lester Welch	1	¤
37	Chief Big Heart	1	¤
37	Chief Little Eagle	1	¤

== See also ==
- National Wrestling Alliance
- NWA World Tag Team Championship
- Georgia Championship Wrestling

== Concurrent championships ==
Sources for 13 simultaneous NWA World Tag Team Championships

- NWA World Tag Team Championship (Los Angeles version)
- NWA World Tag Team Championship (San Francisco version)
- NWA World Tag Team Championship (Central States version)
- NWA World Tag Team Championship (Chicago version)
- NWA World Tag Team Championship (Buffalo Athletic Club version)
- NWA World Tag Team Championship (Georgia version)
- NWA World Tag Team Championship (Iowa/Nebraska version)
- NWA World Tag Team Championship (Indianapolis version)
- NWA World Tag Team Championship (Salt Lake Wrestling Club version)
- NWA World Tag Team Championship (Amarillo version)
- NWA World Tag Team Championship (Minneapolis version)
- NWA World Tag Team Championship (Texas version)
- NWA World Tag Team Championship (Mid-America version)
