= Steve Stanlee =

American professional wrestler (1920–2010)

Personal information
- Born: Steve Zygowicz; February 29, 1920 Chicago, Illinois, U.S.
- Died: July 2, 2010 (aged 90) Lake Geneva, Wisconsin, U.S.

Professional wrestling career
- Ring name(s): Steve Stanlee; Paul Stanlee
- Billed weight: 232 lb (105 kg)

Paul Oswald Zygowicz (February 29, 1920 – July 2, 2010), better known by his ring name of Steve Stanlee, was an American professional wrestler from the late 1940s through the 1960s. He was the younger brother of professional wrestler Gene Stanlee.

== Career ==
Steve served with Gene in the U.S. Navy during World War II and entered the professional wrestling circuit after the war. From 1947 to 1948, Stanlee wrestled under the ring name Paul Stanlee for Georgia Championship Wrestling (gCW). He competed against such wrestlers as Tom Mahoney and Bobby Roberts, winning the majority of these matches. Like his brother Gene, Steve took the nickname "Mr. America" for his chiseled physique, bleached his hair blond, and wore dazzling sequined jackets to the ring. Gene and Steve did train together and had a couple of runs as a tag team, but the two generally stayed on separate career paths. Notably, Steve wrestled Lou Thesz for the NWA World Heavyweight Championship on October 27, 1950, two full years before his brother faced Thesz.

After his stint in Georgia, Stanlee competed in Toronto, Ontario. He worked as a jobber, putting over other wrestlers, such as Al Korman and Pat Flanagan. In the early 1950s, Stanlee wrestled in the Northeastern United States. Wrestling in New York and New Jersey, he received occasional pushes, challenging for the NWA World Heavyweight Championship on several occasions.

Stanlee then traveled to California, where he wrestled in the mid-1950s. He later returned to wrestle for Capitol Wrestling in the New York area in the late 1950s.

Steve didn't catch on with the public in the same way as Gene did, and as a result never attained the same level of fame. He did have a longer career in the ring, however, and may in fact be the better known brother among fans of 1960s wrestling. While Gene was out of wrestling by the early '60s, Steve remained active. He wrestled both as a singles competitor and as part of a tag team, "The Stanlee Steamers", with a kayfabe third "brother", Bob Stanlee (played by Bob Merrill). Unfortunately, Steve won few high-profile matches either way and is generally regarded to have been a "jobber to the stars" for much of his career. He did, however, win the National Wrestling Alliance's Ohio Heavyweight Championship on July 1, 1961, by defeating Frankie Talaber. He dropped the belt back to Talaber in a rematch later that year. Stanlee also helped train Buddy Bison, who wrestled for Georgia Championship Wrestling for several years.

From 1964 to 1966, Stanlee wrestled for the World Wide Wrestling Federation (WWWF). He lost the majority of his matches, but he did get victories over Arnold Skaaland and "Baron" Mikel Scicluna in 1965. After leaving the WWWF, Stanlee wrestled in Hawaii, competing in both singles matches and in a tag team with Jim Hady. He then returned to Georgia Championship Wrestling, putting over the other talent in that promotion as well.

In December 1966 he showed up in Tokyo Pro Wrestling and lost a match against a rising Antonio Inoki.

Late in life, Steve Stanlee appeared in an interview in the Icons Of Wrestling documentary series. He died in Lake Geneva, Wisconsin, on July 2, 2010.

== Championships and accomplishments ==
- National Wrestling Alliance
  - NWA Ohio Heavyweight Championship (1 time)
  - NWA World Tag Team Championship (1 time) with Bob Stanlee
