= NWA Southern Tag Team Championship (Florida version) =

Professional wrestling tag team championship

Details
- Promotion: Championship Wrestling from Florida
- Date established: April 1960
- Date retired: February 1971
Statistics
- First champions: The Mighty Yankees (Moose Evans and Giant Evans)
- Final champions: José Lothario and Dory Funk
- Most reigns: As tag team: José Lothario and Joe Scarpa (3 times); As individual: José Lothario (4 times)
- Longest reign: Buddy Fuller and Lester Welch (210 days)
- Shortest reign: Eddie Graham and Lester Welch (20 days)

The Florida version of the NWA Southern Tag Team Championship was a top tag team title in the National Wrestling Alliance's Florida territory, Championship Wrestling from Florida. It existed from 1960 until 1971, when the title was abandoned.

== Title history ==
Key
No.	Overall reign number
Reign	Reign number for the specific team—reign numbers for the individuals are in parentheses, if different
Days	Number of days held

No.	Champion	Championship change			Reign statistics		Notes	Ref.
No.	Champion	Date	Event	Location	Reign	Days	Notes	Ref.
1	The Mighty Yankees (Moose Evans and Giant Evans	April 1960 (NLT)	CWF show	N/A	1	(Note: The length of the championship reign is too uncertain to calculate.)		
2	Don Curtis and Eddie Graham	May 10, 1960	CWF show	Tampa, Florida	1			
Championship history is unrecorded from May 10, 1960 to March 1964.
3	Don Curtis and Bob Ellis	March 1964 (NLT)	CWF show	N/A	1			
Championship history is unrecorded from March 1964 to April 1965.
4	The Corsicans (Corsica Jean and Corsica Joe)	April 1965 (NLT)	CWF show	N/A	1			
Championship history is unrecorded from April 1965 to February 1967.
5	George Becker and Johnny Weaver	February 1967 (NLT)	CWF show	N/A	1			
6	Black Jack Daniels and Stan Kowalski	February 14, 1967	CWF show	Tampa, Florida	1	27		
7	Don Curtis (3) and José Lothario	March 13, 1967	CWF show	Orlando, Florida	1	21		
8	Rocket Monroe and Sputnik Monroe	April 3, 1967	CWF show	Orlando, Florida	1	22		
9	Buddy Fuller and Lester Welch	April 25, 1967	CWF show	Tampa, Florida	1	210		
10	Aldo Bogni and Bronko Lubich	November 21, 1967	CWF show	Tampa, Florida	1	91		
11	Eddie Graham (2) and Lester Welch (2)	February 20, 1968	CWF show	Tampa, Florida	1	20		
12	Aldo Bogni and Bronko Lubich	March 11, 1968	CWF show	West Palm Beach, Florida	2	43		
13	José Lothario (2) and Joe Scarpa	April 23, 1968	CWF show	Tampa, Florida	1	105		
14	Boris Malenko and Johnny Valentine	August 6, 1968	CWF show	Tampa, Florida	1	25		
15	José Lothario (3) and Joe Scarpa	August 31, 1968	CWF show	Tampa, Florida	2	24		
16	The Blue Infernos	September 24, 1968	CWF show	Tampa, Florida	1	14		
17	José Lothario (4) and Joe Scarpa	October 8, 1968	CWF show	Tampa, Florida	3	21		
18	Louie Tillet and Tarzan Tyler	October 29, 1968	CWF show	Tampa, Florida	1	85		
19	The Medics (Billy Garrett and Jim Starr)	January 22, 1969	CWF show	Miami, Florida	1			
Championship history is unrecorded from January 22, 1969 to January 1969.
—	Deactivated	January 1969	—	—	—	—	Championship not used	
20	Buddy Fuller (2) and Bob Roop	February 1970	N/A	N/A	1	(Note: The exact date Fuller and Roop were awarded the championship is uncertain, which means that their reign lasted between 1 and 10 days.)	Fuller and Roop were awarded the championship	
21	Dante and The Great Mephisto	February 10, 1970	CWF show	Tampa, Florida	1			
Championship history is unrecorded from February 10, 1970 to February 9, 1971.
22	José Lothario (5) and Dory Funk	February 9, 1971	CWF show	Tampa, Florida	1	(Note: The exact date the championship was abandoned is uncertain, which means that the championship reign lasted between 1 and 19 days.)	Defeated The Medics to win the championship	
—	Deactivated	February 1971	—	—	—	—	Championship was abandoned	

== See also ==
- Championship Wrestling from Florida
- National Wrestling Alliance
- NWA Southern Tag Team Championship (Official NWA-sanctioned version) (1999–present)
- NWA Southern Tag Team Championship (Mid-America version) (1945–1988, renamed an AWA title in 1977)
