= NWA Southern Tag Team Championship (Knoxville version) =

The NWA Tennessee Southern Tag Team Championship was a short-lived professional wrestling tag team title in the National Wrestling Alliance that was defended in Southern Championship Wrestling. It existed from 1981 to 1982.

== Title history ==
Wrestler:	Times:	Date:	Location:	Notes:
Jimmy Golden & Buddy Rose	1	May 1982		Jimmy Golden & Buddy Rose are the first only champions in the promotions brief history. The titles are abandoned later that year as the promotion folds shortly thereafter.
