= NWA World Tag Team Championship (San Francisco version) =

Professional wrestling tag team championship

- The San Francisco version of the championship

Details
- Promotion: NWA San Francisco (1950–1961); Big Time Wrestling (1961–1979)
- Date established: April 4, 1950 (NWA: SF version); June 1961 (BTW version)
- Date retired: 1961 (NWA: SF version); April 1979 (BTW version)

Other name(s)
- World Tag Team Championship
Statistics
- First champion(s): Ray Eckert and Hard Boiled Haggerty (NWA: SF Version); Guy and Joe Brunetti (BTW version)
- Longest reign: Peter Maivia and Ray Stevens (At least 397 days)
- Shortest reign: Ben and Mike Sharpe (1 day)

The National Wrestling Alliance (NWA) member NWA San Francisco promoted a professional wrestling tag team championship under the name NWA World Tag Team Championship from 1950 until 1961 in and around their local territory until it closed. When San Francisco based Big Time Wrestling became a member of the NWA in 1968 they began promoting their version of the NWA World Tag Team Championship as part of their shows until the championship was abandoned in 1979. The NWA rules allowed each individual member to promote a championship under that name, which meant there were several NWA World Tag Team Championships promoted across North America at some point between 1950 and 1982, with two different versions being promoted in San Francisco, although not at the same time. At one point in 1957 no less than 13 different versions of the NWA World Tag Team Championship were recognized across the United States.^{[Championships]} At least 21 different regional branches of the NWA World Tag Team Championship have identified as being active at some point between 1950 and 1991. In 1992 the NWA Board of Directors sanctioned one main NWA World Tag Team Championship under their control. As it is a professional wrestling championship, it is not won via legitimate competition; it is instead won via a scripted ending to a match or on occasion awarded to a wrestler because of a storyline.

Ray Eckert and Hard Boiled Haggerty are recognized as the first holders of the NWA San Francisco version of the championship, said to have defeated the team of Ron Etchison and Larry Moquin, although no direct record of the match has been found; it was only mentioned on television. Due to gaps in documentation from the era not all championship changes have been record with specific dates, only the general period of time that they happened. Due to this it is impossible to say which team held the championship for the shortest period of time although it is unlikely to be shorter than the one-day reign of Mike and Ben Sharpe from January 9 to 10, 1958. The Sharpe Brothers' eighth reign lasted at least 131 days, the longest known reign of any champions. The Sharpe Brothers also hold the record for most reigns, a total of 18, 15 more than any other team. In 1957 the San Francisco version of the championship was one of thirteen NWA World Tag Team Championships being promoted in the United States throughout the NWA territories.^{[Championships]} The NWA: San Francisco version of the championship was abandoned in when promoter Joe Malcevicz closed his promotion in 1962.

In 1961 Roy Shire started a rival wrestling promotion in San Francisco called Big Time Wrestling, in direct competition with NWA: San Francisco. Shires' promotion created its own World Tag Team Championship in 1961, with Guy and Joe Brunetti as its first champions. Initially Shire was associated with the American Wrestling Alliance, but in 1968 he became a member of the NWA. At that point the Big Time Wrestling tag team championship was given the NWA suffix. Big Time Wrestling abandoned the tag team championship in 1979 and two years later the promotion closed. While it is possible that there were shorter reigns, the seven-day reign of the Great Mephisto and Kinji Shibuya in April 1973 is the shortest documented title reign. The Blonde Bombers's (Ray Stevens and Pat Patterson) reign that started in April 1965 was the longest reign on record, a total of 623 days.

== Title history ==
Key

No.	The overall championship reign
Reign	The reign number for the specific wrestler listed.
Event	The event promoted by the respective promotion in which the title changed hands
N/A	The specific information is not known
—	Used for vacated reigns in order to not count it as an official reign
	Indicates that there was a period where the lineage is undocumented due to the lack of written documentation in that time period.

=== NWA San Francisco history ===
No.	Champions	Reign	Date	Days held	Location	Event	Notes	Ref(s)
1	Ray Eckert and Hard Boiled Haggerty	1	April 4, 1950	35	(Note: The location of the match was not captured as part of the documentation.)	Live event	Defeated Ronnie Etchison and Larry Moquin	
2	Ben and Mike Sharpe	1	May 9, 1950	20		Live event		
3	Ray Eckert (2) and Frederick Von Schacht	1	May 29, 1950	15		Live event		
4	Ben and Mike Sharpe	2	June 13, 1950	24		Live event		
5	Tom Rice and Frederick Von Schacht (2)	1	July 7, 1950	(Note: The date when Rice and Von Schact lost the championship has not been documented which means the championship reign lasted anywhere between 1 day and 206 days.)		Live event		
6	Primo Carnera and Sándor Szabó (2)	1	January 1951 (NLT)	(Note: The date when Carnera and Szabó won the championship has not been documented which means the championship reign lasted anywhere between 1 day and 29 days.)		Live event	Records are unclear as to whom they defeated to win the championship	
7	Ben and Mike Sharpe	3	January 30, 1951	(Note: The date where the championship was vacated has not been documented which means the championship reign lasted anywhere between 1 day and 111 days.)		Live event		
—	Vacated	—	1951	—	N/A	N/A	Championship vacated for undocumented reasons	
8	Ben and Mike Sharpe	4	May 22, 1951	276		Live event	Defeated Killer Kowalski and Sándor Szabó to win the vacant championship	
9	Ron Etchison and Sándor Szabó	1	February 22, 1952	8	Oakland, California	Live event		
10	Ben and Mike Sharpe	5	March 1, 1952	13		Live event		
11	Hombre Montana (2) and Leo Nomellini	1	March 14, 1952	4	Oakland, California	Live event		
12	Ben and Mike Sharpe	6	March 18, 1952	273		Live event		
13	Fred Atkins and Ray Eckert (3)	1	December 16, 1952	14		Live event		
14	Ben and Mike Sharpe	7	December 30, 1952	127		Live event		
15	Leo Nomellini (2) and Enrique Torres	1	May 6, 1953	(Note: The date where the championship was vacated has not been documented which means the championship reign lasted anywhere between 1 day and 10 days.)	San Francisco, California	Live event		
—	Held up	—	May 1953	—	N/A	N/A	Championship held up after a match against Ben and Mike Sharpe ended without a winner	
15	Ben and Mike Sharpe	8	1953	(Note: The date where Ben and Mike Sharpe won the championship has not been documented which means the championship reign lasted anywhere between 131 and 374 days.)		Live event	Won the rematch against Nomelini and Torres.	
16	Rocky Brown and Leo Nomellini (3)	1	May 11, 1954	(Note: The date where the championship was vacated has not been documented which means the championship reign lasted anywhere between 51 and 81 days.)	San Francisco, California	Live event		
—	Vacated	—	July 1954	—	N/A	N/A	Championship vacated when Nomellini resumes playing for the San Francisco 49ers	
17	Ben and Mike Sharpe	9	February 15, 1955	81		Live event	Defeated Leo Nomellini and Hombre Montana to win the vacant championship	
18	Lord James Blears and Gene Kiniski	1	May 7, 1955	82		Live event		
19	Johnny Barend and Enrique Torres (2)	1	July 28, 1955	12	Richmond, California	Live event		
20	Lord James Blears and Gene Kiniski	2	August 9, 1955	77		Live event		
21	Ronnie Etchison and Ray Stern	1	October 25, 1955	(Note: The date where Etchson and Stern lost the championship has not been documented which means the championship reign lasted anywhere between 7 and 34 days.)		Live event		
22	Lord James Blears and Gene Kiniski	3	November 1955	(Note: The date where Blears and Kiniski won the championship has not been documented which means the championship reign lasted anywhere between 1 day and 29 days.)		Live event		
23	Ben and Mike Sharpe	10	November 29, 1955	157		Live event		
24	Koukichi Endo and Rikidōzan	1	May 4, 1956	15	Osaka, Japan	Live event		
25	Ben and Mike Sharpe	11	May 19, 1956	55	Sapporo, Japan	Live event		
26	Bobo Brazil and Enrique Torres (3)	1	July 13, 1956	32	Oakland, California	Live event		
27	Bill and Ed Miller	1	August 14, 1956	70	San Francisco, California	Live event		
28	Ben and Mike Sharpe	12	October 23, 1956	60	San Francisco, California	Live event		
29	Ronnie Etchison (2) and Enrique Torres (4)	1	December 22, 1956	7	Fresno, California	Live event		
30	Ben and Mike Sharpe	13	December 29, 1956	(Note: The date where Ben and Mike Sharpe lost the championship has not been documented which means the championship reign lasted anywhere between 3 and 33 days.)	Fresno, California	Live event		
31	Emil and Ernie Dusek	1	January 1957	(Note: The date where the Duseks won the championship has not been documented which means the championship reign lasted anywhere between 1 day and 58 days.)	San Francisco, California	Live event		
32	Adrien and Paul Baillargeon	1	February 1957	(Note: The date where the Baillergeon brothers won the championship has not been documented which means the championship reign lasted anywhere between 47 and 74 days.)	San Francisco, California	Live event		
33	Blears (4) and Ben Sharpe (14)	1	April 16, 1957	(Note: The date where Blears and Sharpe lost the championship has not been documented which means the championship reign lasted anywhere between 1 day and 22 days.)		Live event		
34	Leo Nomellini (4) and Enrique Torres (5)	2	1957	(Note: The date where Nomellini and Torres won the championship has not been documented which means the championship reign lasted anywhere between 1 day and 22 days.)		Live event		
35	Ben (15) and Mike Sharpe	14	May 9, 1957	19	Stockton, California	Live event		
36	Bobo Brazil and Enrique Torres (6)	2	May 28, 1957	(Note: The date where Brazil and Torres lost the championship has not been documented which means the championship reign lasted anywhere between 40 and 64 days.)	San Francisco, California	Live event		
37	Ben (16) and Mike Sharpe	15	July 1957	(Note: The date where Ben and Mike Sharpe won the championship has not been documented which means the championship reign lasted anywhere between 52 and 82 days.)		Live event		
38	Tex McKenzie and Ramon Torres	1	September 21, 1957	(Note: The date where McKenzie and Torres lost the championship has not been documented which means the championship reign lasted anywhere between 41 and 70 days.)	Fresno, California	Live event		
39	Omaya Kato and Karl Von Schober	1	November 1957	(Note: The date where Kato and Von Schober won the championship has not been documented which means the championship reign lasted anywhere between 13 and 42 days.)		Live event		
40	Ciclon Anaya and Ramon Torres (2)	1	December 13, 1957	27	Oakland, California	Live event		
41	Ben (17) and Mike Sharpe	16	January 9, 1958	1	Stockton, California	Live event		
42	Ciclon Anaya and Ramon Torres (3)	2	January 10, 1958	39	Oakland, California	Live event		
43	Hans Hermann and Art Neilson	1	February 18, 1958	69	San Francisco, California	Live event		
44	Ramon Torres (4) and Dick Warren	1	April 28, 1958	60	Sacramento, California	Live event		
45	Hombre Montana and Tiny Mills	1	June 27, 1958	17	San Jose, California	Live event		
46	Ramon Torres (5) and Dick Warren	2	July 14, 1958	40	Sacramento, California	Live event		
47	Gene Dubuque and Mike Valentino	1	August 23, 1958	61	Fresno, California	Live event		
48	Ronnie Etchison (3) and Buddy Rogers	1	October 23, 1958	29	Oakland, California	Live event		
49	Gene Dubuque (2) and Fritz Von Goehring	1	November 21, 1958	(Note: The date where Dubuque and Von Goehring lost the championship has not been documented which means the championship reign lasted anywhere between 41 and 49 days.)	Oakland, California	Live event		
50	Johnny Barend (2) and Ronnie Etchison (4)	1	January 1959 (NLT)	(Note: The date where Barend and Etchison won the championship has not been documented which means the championship reign lasted anywhere between 1 day and 49 days.)		Live event		
51	Red Hangman and Ben Sharpe (18)	1	January 10, 1959	(Note: The date where Red Hangman and Ben Sharpe lost the championship has not been documented which means the championship reign lasted anywhere between 1 day and 597 days.)	Fresno, California	Live event		
52	Great Lothario and Ramon Torres (6)	1	1959	(Note: The date where Great Lothario and Torres lost the championship has not been documented which means the championship reign lasted anywhere between 1 day and 597 days.)		Live event		
53	Ben (19) and Mike Sharpe	17	August 1959	(Note: The date where Mike and Ben Sharpe won the championship has not been documented which means the championship reign lasted anywhere between 31 and 75 days.)		Live event	Records are unclear as to whom they defeated to win the championship.	
54	Rip Miller and Enrique Torres (7)	1	October 1959	(Note: The date where Miller and Torres won the championship has not been documented which means the championship reign lasted anywhere between 1 day and 15 days.)		Live event		
55	Ben (20) and Mike Sharpe	18	October 16, 1959	(Note: The date where Ben and Mike Sharpe lost the championship has not been documented which means the championship reign lasted anywhere between 46 and 76 days.)		Live event		
56	Ron Etchison (2) and Alberto Torres	1	December 1959	(Note: The date where Etchinson and Torres won and lost the championship has not been documented which means the championship reign lasted anywhere between 1 day and 396 days.)		Live event		
57	Man Mountain Campbell and Mr. Kleen	1	1960	(Note: The date where Campbell and Mr. Kleen won and lost the championship has not been documented which means the championship reign lasted anywhere between 1 day and 729 days.)		Live event		
—	Vacated	—	1961	—	N/A	N/A	Championship vacated for undocumented reasons	
58	Reggie Parks and Enrique Torres (8)	1	August 8, 1961	(Note: The date where the championship was abandoned has not been documented which means the championship reign lasted anywhere between 1 day and 145 days.)	San Francisco, California	Live event	Defeated Magnificent Maurice and Ed Miller to win the championship	
—	Deactivated	—	1961	—	N/A	N/A	Championship was abandoned when the NWA San Francisco promotion closed.	

=== Big Time Wrestling history ===
No.	Champions	Reign	Date	Days held	Location	Event	Notes	Ref(s)
Big Time Wrestling World Tag Team Championship
1	Guy and Joe Brunetti	1	June 1961	(Note: The date where the Brunettis won the championship has not been documented which means the championship reign lasted anywhere between 134 and 163 days.)	San Francisco, California	N/A	Billed as champions	
2	Mitsu Arakawa and Kinji Shibuya	1	November 11, 1961	364	San Francisco, California	Live event		
3	Nick Bockwinkel (3) and Wilbur Snyder	1	November 10, 1962	157	San Francisco, California	Live event	Nick Bockwinkle previously held the championship under the name Dick Warren	
4	Art and Stan Nielsen	1	March 16, 1963	182	San Francisco, California	Live event		
5	Pepper Gomez and Jose Lothario (2)	1	September 14, 1963	(Note: The date where Gomez and Lothario lost the championship has not been documented which means the championship reign lasted anywhere between 46 and 75 days.)	San Francisco, California	Live event		
6	Dan Manoukian and Ray Stevens	1	November 1964	(Note: The date where Manoukian and Stevens won the championship has not been documented which means the championship reign lasted anywhere between 117 and 146 days.)	San Francisco, California	Live event		
7	The Destroyer and Billy Red Lyons	1	March 27, 1965	21	San Francisco, California	Live event		
8	The Blond Bombers (Ray Stevens (2) and Pat Patterson)	1	April 17, 1965	623	San Francisco, California	Live event		
9	Ciclon Negro and The Mongolian Stomper	1	December 31, 1966	21	San Francisco, California	Live event		
10	The Blond Bombers (Ray Stevens (2) and Pat Patterson)	2	January 21, 1967	77	San Francisco, California	Live event		
11	Pepper Gomez (2) and Pedro Morales	1	April 8, 1967	399	San Francisco, California	Live event		
NWA World Tag Team Championship
12	Great Sasaki and Kinji Shibuya (2)	1	May 11, 1968	28	San Francisco, California	Live event		
13	Pepper Gomez (3) and Pedro Morales	2	June 8, 1968	35	San Francisco, California	Live event		
14	Masa Saito and Kinji Shibuya (3)	1	July 13, 1968	(Note: The date where Saito and Shibuya lost the championship has not been documented which means the championship reign lasted anywhere between 80 and 109 days.)	San Francisco, California	Live event		
15	Pepper Gomez (4) and Peter Maivia	1	October 1969	(Note: The date where Gomez and Maivia won and lost the championship has not been documented which means the championship reign lasted anywhere between 1 day and 60 days.)		Live event		
16	Peter Maivia (2) and Ray Stevens (4)	1	November 1969	(Note: The date where Maivia and Stevens won and lost the championship has not been documented which means the championship reign lasted anywhere between 397 and 456 days.)	N/A	N/A	Gomez gave his half of the championship to Ray Stevens due to injury	
17	"Superstar" Billy Graham and Pat Patterson (3)	1	January 1971	(Note: The date where Graham and Patterson won the championship has not been documented which means the championship reign lasted anywhere between 230 and 260 days.)	San Francisco, California	Live event		
18	Pepper Gomez (5) and Rocky Johnson	1	September 18, 1971	238	San Francisco, California	Live event		
19	Lars Anderson and Paul DeMarco	1	May 13, 1972	207	San Francisco, California	Live event		
20	Rocky Johnson (2) and Pat Patterson (4)	1	December 6, 1972	140	Sacramento, California	Live event		
21	Great Mephisto and Kinji Shibuya (4)	1	April 25, 1973	7	Sacramento, California	Live event		
22	Rocky Johnson (3) and Pat Patterson (5)	2	May 2, 1973	91	Sacramento, California	Live event		
23	The Interns (Intern #1 and Intern #2)	1	August 1, 1973	(Note: The date where the Interns lost the championship has not been documented which means the championship reign lasted anywhere between 31 and 60 days.)		Live event		
24	Masa Saito and Kinji Shibuya (5)	2	September 1973	(Note: The date where Saito and Shubuya lost the championship has not been documented which means the championship reign lasted anywhere between 32 and 90 days.)		Live event	The championship match may have been fictional	
25	Rocky Johnson (4) and Pat Patterson (6)	3	November 1973	(Note: The date where Johnson and Patterson won the championship has not been documented which means the championship reign lasted anywhere between 96 and 125 days.)		Live event		
26	The Von Brauners (Kurt & Karl Von Brauner)	1	March 6, 1974	108	Sacramento, California	Live event		
27	Peter Maivia (3) and Pat Patterson (7)	1	June 22, 1974	(Note: The date where Maivia and Patterson lost the championship has not been documented which means the championship reign lasted anywhere between 283 and 312 days.)	San Francisco, California	Live event		
28	The Invaders (Invader #1 and Invader #2)	1	April 1975	(Note: The date where the Invaders won the championship has not been documented which means the championship reign lasted anywhere between 101 and 130 days.)	Florida	Live event		
29	Moondog Mayne and Pat Patterson (8)	1	August 9, 1975	14	San Francisco, California	Live event		
30	The Invaders (Invader #1 and Invader #2)	2	August 23, 1975	67	San Francisco, California	Live event		
31	Pedro Morales (3) and Pat Patterson (9)	1	October 29, 1975	147	Sacramento, California	Live event		
32	Invader #1 (3) and Don Muraco	1	March 24, 1976	52	Sacramento, California	Live event		
33	Tony Garea and Pat Patterson (10)	1	May 15, 1976	126	San Francisco, California	Live event		
34	The Royal Kangaroos (Jonathan Boyd and Norman Frederick Charles III)	1	September 18, 1976	77	San Francisco, California	Live event		
35	The Valiant Brothers (Jimmy and Johnny Valiant)	1	December 4, 1976	67	San Francisco, California	Live event		
36	Pepper Gomez (6) and Pat Patterson (11)	1	February 9, 1977	49	Sacramento, California	Live event		
37	Bob Roop and Alexis Smirnoff	1	March 30, 1977	77	Sacramento, California	Live event		
38	Pepper Gomez (7) and Al Madril	1	June 15, 1977	(Note: The date where the championship was vacated has not been documented which means the championship reign lasted anywhere between 1 day and 15 days.)	Sacramento, California	Live event		
—	Vacated	—	June 1977	—	N/A	N/A	Championship vacated when Al Madril was injured and unable to defend the championship.	
39	The Von Steigers (Kurt and Karl Von Steiger)	1	July 16, 1977	119	San Francisco, California	Live event	Won an 8-team tournament to become champions	
40	Moondog Mayne (2) and Ray Stevens (5)	1	November 12, 1977	25	San Francisco, California	Live event		
41	The Von Steigers (Kurt and Karl Von Steiger)	2	December 7, 1977	47	Sacramento, California	Live event		
42	Black Gordman and Goliath	1	January 23, 1978	30	Sacramento, California	Live event		
43	Dean Ho and Moondog Mayne (3)	1	February 22, 1978	(Note: The date where the championship was vacated has not been documented which means the championship reign lasted anywhere between 38 and 67 days.)	Sacramento, California	Live event		
—	Vacated	—	April 1978	—	N/A	N/A	Championship vacated for undocumented reasons	
44	Dean Ho (2) and Ron Starr	1	September 20, 1978	35	"Puerto Rico"	N/A	Was billed as having won a tournament in Puerto Rico that never happened.	
45	Buddy Rose and Ed Wiskoski	1	October 25, 1978	29	Sacramento, California	Live event		
46	Ron Starr (2) and Enrique Vera	1	November 23, 1978	14	Sacramento, California	Live event		
47	Buddy Rose and Ed Wiskoski	2	December 7, 1978	(Note: The date where Rose gave up his half of the championship has not been documented which means the championship reign lasted anywhere between 56 and 83 days.)	Sacramento, California	Live event		
48	Roddy Piper and Ed Wiskoski (3)	1	February 1979	(Note: The date where the championship was abandoned has not been documented which means the championship reign lasted anywhere between 32 and 88 days.)	N/A	N/A	Rose gave his half to Piper	
—	Retired	—	April 1979	—	N/A	N/A	The Championship was deactivated.	

== Team reigns by combined length ==
Key

Symbol	Meaning
¤	The exact length of at least one title reign is uncertain, so the shortest possible length is used.

Rank	Team	No. of reigns	Combined days
1	The Sharpe Brothers (Ben and Mike Sharpe)	19	1370¤
2	The Blond Bombers (Ray Stevens and Pat Patterson)	2	700
3	Pepper Gomez and Pedro Morales	2	434
4	Peter Maivia and Ray Stevens	1	397¤
5	Mitsu Arakawa and Kinji Shibuya	1	364
6	Rocky Johnson and Pat Patterson	3	327¤
7	Peter Maivia and Pat Patterson	1	283¤
8	Pepper Gomez and Rocky Johnson	1	238
9	Superstar Billy Graham and Pat Patterson	1	230¤
10	Lars Anderson and Paul DeMarco	1	207
11	Art and Stan Nielsen	1	182
12	The Invaders (Invader #1 and Invader #2)	2	168¤
13	Lord James Blears and Gene Kiniski	3	160
14	Nick Bockwinkel and Wilbur Snyder	1	157
15	Pedro Morales and Pat Patterson	1	147
16	The Von Steigers (Kurt and Karl Von Steiger)	2	145
17	Guy and Joe Brunetti	1	134¤
18	Reggie Parks and Enrique Torres	1	134¤
19	Tony Garea and Pat Patterson	1	126
20	Dan Manoukian and Ray Stevens	1	117¤
21	Masa Saito and Kinji Shibuya	2	112¤
22	The Von Brauners (Kurt and Karl Von Brauner)	1	108
23	Ramon Torres and Dick Warren	2	100
24	Buddy Rose and Ed Wiskoski	2	85¤
25	Bob Roop and Alexis Smirnoff	1	77
26	The Royal Kangaroos (Jonathan Boyd and Norman Frederick Charles III)	1	77
27	Bobo Brazil and Enrique Torres	2	72¤
28	Bill and Ed Miller	1	70
29	Hans Hermann and Art Neilson	1	69
30	Valiant Brothers (Jimmy and Johnny Valiant)	1	67
31	Ciclon Anaya and Ramon Torres	2	66
32	Gene Dubuque and Mike Valentino	1	61
33	Invader #1 and Don Muraco	1	52
34	Rocky Brown and Leo Nomellini	1	51¤
35	Pepper Gomez and Pat Patterson	1	49
36	Adrien and Paul Baillergeon	1	47
37	Pepper Gomez and Jose Lothario	1	46¤
38	Black Gordman and Goliath	1	41
39	Gene Dubuque and Fritz Von Goehring	1	41¤
39	Tex McKenzie and Ramon Torres	1	41¤
40	Dean Ho and Moondog Mayne	1	38¤
42	Dean Ho and Ron Starr	1	35
42	Ray Eckert and Hard Boiled Haggerty	1	35
44	Roddy Piper and Ed Wiskoski	1	32¤
45	The Interns (Intern #1 and Intern #2)	1	31¤
46	Ronnie Etchison and Buddy Rogers	1	29
47	Great Sasaki and Kinji Shibuya	1	28
48	Moondog Mayne and Ray Stevens	1	25
49	Ciclon Negro and The Mongolian Stomper	1	21
49	The Destroyer and Billy Red Lyons	1	21
51	Hombre Montana and Tiny Mills	1	17
52	Koukichi Endo and Rikidōzan	1	15
52	Ray Eckert and Frederick Von Schacht	1	15
54	Fred Atkins and Ray Eckert	1	14
54	Moondog Mayne and Pat Patterson	1	14
54	Ron Starr and Enrique Vera	1	14
57	Omaya Kato and Karl Von Schober	1	13¤
58	Johnny Barend and Enrique Torres	1	12
59	Ron Etchison and Sándor Szabó (wrestler)	1	8
60	Great Mephisto and Kinji Shibuya	1	7
60	Ron Etchison and Enrique Torres	1	7
60	Ron Etchison and Ray Stern	1	7¤
63	Hombre Montana and Leo Nomellini	1	4
64	Leo Nomellini and Enrique Torres	2	2¤
65	Johnny Barend and Ronnie Etchison	1	1¤
65	Lord James Blears and Ben Sharpe	1	1¤
65	Primo Carnera and Sándor Szabó	1	1¤
65	Emil and Ernie Dusek	1	1¤
65	Ron Etchison and Alberto Torres	1	1¤
65	Pepper Gomez and Al Madril	1	1¤
65	Pepper Gomez and Peter Maivia	1	1¤
65	Great Lothario and Ramon Torres	1	1¤
65	Man Mountain Campbell and Mr. Kleen	1	1¤
65	Rip Miller and Enrique Torres	1	1¤
65	Red Hangman and Ben Sharpe	1	1¤
65	Tom Rice and Frederick Von Schacht	1	1¤

== Individual reigns by combined length ==
Key

Symbol	Meaning
¤	The exact length of at least one title reign is uncertain, so the shortest possible length is used.

Rank	Wrestler	No. of reigns	Combined days
1	Pat Patterson	11	1,876¤
2	Ben Sharpe	21	1372¤
3	Mike Sharpe	19	1370¤
4	Ray Stevens	5	1,239¤
5	Pepper Gomez	7	769¤
6	Peter Maivia	3	681¤
7	Pedro Morales	3	581
8	Rocky Johnson	4	565¤
9	Kinji Shibuya	5	511¤
10	Mitsu Arakawa	1	364
11	Enrique Torres	8	288¤
12	Art Neilson	2	251
13	"Superstar" Billy Graham	1	230¤
14	Invader #1	3	220¤
15	Ramon Torres	6	208¤
16	Paul DeMarco	1	207
16	Lars Anderson	1	207
18	Stan Nielsen	1	182
19	Invader #2	2	168¤
20	Lord James Blears	4	161¤
21	Gene Kiniski	3	160
22	Nick Bockwinkel	1	157
22	Wilbur Snyder	1	157
24	Karl Von Steiger	2	145
24	Kurt Von Steiger	2	145
26	Guy Brunetti	1	134¤
26	Joe Brunetti	1	134¤
26	Reggie Parks	1	134¤
29	Tony Garea	1	126
30	Dan Manoukian	1	117¤
30	Ed Wiskoski	3	117¤
32	Masa Saito	2	112¤
33	Karl Von Brauner	1	108
33	Kurt Von Brauner	1	108
34	Gene Dubuque	2	102¤
35	Dick Warren	2	100
36	Buddy Rose	3	85¤
37	Alexis Smirnoff	1	77
37	Bob Roop	1	77
37	Jonathan Boyd	1	77
37	Moondog Mayne	3	77¤
37	Norman Frederick Charles III	1	77
42	Bobo Brazil	2	72¤
43	Bill Miller	1	70
43	Ed Miller	1	70
45	Hans Hermann	1	69
46	Jimmy Valiant	1	67
46	Johnny Valiant	1	67
48	Ciclon Anaya	2	66
49	Ray Eckert	3	64
50	Mike Valentino	1	61
51	Leo Nomellini	4	57¤
52	Ron Etchison	6	53
53	Don Muraco	1	52
54	Rocky Brown	1	51¤
55	Ron Starr	3	49
56	Adrien Baillergeon	1	47
56	Paul Baillergeon	1	47
57	Jose Lothario	1	46¤
58	Tex McKenzie	1	41¤
58	Fritz Von Goehring	1	41¤
58	Black Gordman	1	41
58	Goliath	1	41
62	Dean Ho	1	38¤
63	Dean Ho	1	35
63	Hard Boiled Haggerty	1	35
65	Roddy Piper	1	32¤
66	Intern #1	1	31¤
66	Intern #2	1	31¤
68	Buddy Rogers	1	29
69	Great Sasaki	1	28
70	Billy Red Lyons	1	21
70	The Destroyer	1	21
70	The Mongolian Stomper	1	21
70	Ciclon Negro	1	21
70	Hombre Montana	2	21
75	Tiny Mills	1	17
76	Frederick Von Schacht	2	16¤
77	Rikidōzan	1	15
77	Koukichi Endo	1	15
79	Fred Atkins	1	14
79	Enrique Vera	1	14
81	Omaya Kato	1	13¤
81	Karl Von Schober	1	13¤
81	Johnny Barend	2	13¤
84	Sándor Szabó	2	9¤
85	Ray Stern	1	7¤
85	Great Mephisto	1	7
87	Great Lothario	1	1¤
87	Rip Miller	1	1¤
87	Tom Rice	1	1¤
87	Al Madril	1	1¤
87	Alberto Torres	1	1¤
87	Emil Dusek	1	1¤
87	Ernie Dusek	1	1¤
87	Primo Carnera	1	1¤
87	Man Mountain Campbell	1	1¤
87	Mr. Kleen	1	1¤
87	Red Hangman	1	1¤

== 1977 Championship Tournament ==
Quarterfinals
The Von Steigers (Kurt and Karl Von Steiger	W
Jimmy Golden and Don Jackson
Moondog Mayne and Peter Maivia	W
Hiro Ota and Mr. X
Bob Roop and Keith Franks	W
Pepper Gomez and Chavo Guerrero
Bye
Bye

Semifinals
The Von Steigers	W
Moondog Mayne and Peter Maivia
Bob Roop and Keith Franks
Jimmy Golden and Kevin Sullivan	W

Finals
The Von Steigers	W
Jimmy Golden and Kevin Sullivan

== See also ==
- National Wrestling Alliance
- NWA World Tag Team Championship

== Concurrent championships ==
Sources for 13 simultaneous NWA World Tag Team Championships

- NWA World Tag Team Championship (Los Angeles version)
- NWA World Tag Team Championship (San Francisco version)
- NWA World Tag Team Championship (Central States version)
- NWA World Tag Team Championship (Chicago version)
- NWA World Tag Team Championship (Buffalo Athletic Club version)
- NWA World Tag Team Championship (Georgia version)
- NWA World Tag Team Championship (Iowa/Nebraska version)
- NWA World Tag Team Championship (Indianapolis version)
- NWA World Tag Team Championship (Salt Lake Wrestling Club version)
- NWA World Tag Team Championship (Amarillo version)
- NWA World Tag Team Championship (Minneapolis version)
- NWA World Tag Team Championship (Texas version)
- NWA World Tag Team Championship (Mid-America version)
