= Enrique Torres =

Mexican-American professional wrestler (1922–2007)

Personal information
- Born: July 25, 1922 Santa Ana, California, U.S.
- Died: September 10, 2007 (aged 85) Calgary, Alberta, Canada

Professional wrestling career
- Ring name: Enrique Torres
- Debut: July 23, 1946
- Retired: 1969

Enrique Torres (July 25, 1922 – September 10, 2007) was an American professional wrestler, the oldest three Torres brothers in wrestling. One of the biggest stars in Southern California in the 1940s and 1950s, Torres held the Los Angeles version of the World Title almost nonstop between 1946 and 1950. During that time he had two of the biggest feuds of the era with Gorgeous George and Baron Michele Leone.

== Professional wrestling career ==
Torres was born in Santa Ana, California and after a long amateur career entered professional wrestling in July 1946, debuting at the Olympic Auditorium. He was very successful in the nascent and booming televised wrestling market in the California. He had no gimmicks, however his signature move was a deftly executed Flying Scissors. He used no self given stage name but a Mexican-market newspaper billed him as “La Pantera Negro de Sonora”, or "The Black Panther from Sonora, Mexico," due to his "smooth and lightning-fast moves." He was later named "The Mexican Adonis." In his first year, he won the California version of the world heavyweight championship before losing it Gorgeous George, only to win it back the following year.

In 1952 Torres and then-rival Baron Leone were involved in a case that went all the way to the Santa Monica Superior Court due to two fans claiming they were injured when Leone threw Torres into the crowd. Leone claimed if he was capable of the feat he'd leave wrestling to play for the Southern Cal football team, and the two were exonerated. One of Torres' greatest matches was in February 1953 while he was the reigning Pacific Coast Heavy Weight champion, he wrestled the legendary world heavyweight champion Lou Thesz to a one-hour draw. The gate was a then-record $5000 in Sacramento. He also claimed the Central States championship in 1952 and 1963.

Due to his success Torres' brothers Alberto and Ramon wanted to join him in wrestling. Enrique worked with Alberto and Ramon; Rachel, Enrique’s second wife, worked to help train Ramon in the various wrestling holds and tactics. In time, with hard work and training in Oakland, CA they received Enrique's blessing and later went on the road. The three went on to be involved in a 'Vachon-Torres Brother War' in Georgia against the Vachon wrestling family. In 1971 Alberto was the first to die, as a result of a ruptured pancreas from a match in the ring. Ramon died in August 2000 of heart failure.

In addition to his singles titles, Torres also held numerous tag team championships teamed with Bobo Brazil, Leo Nomellini, Ronnie Etchison, Johnny Barend, Jess Ortega, and his brothers in the 1950s and 1960s, ranging from Texas to the Central States territory.

Enrique and Alberto wrestled a headliner match in Havana, Cuba the night that the Batista regime fell to Castro’s rebel army in 1959 and returned to the US with the help of his Promoter, Benny Ginsberg and his Meyer Lansky connections in Cuba.

Enrique retired in 1968 after one last run as a headline star, living in California Hawaii and Nevada. In 1969 Enrique was asked to make a cameo appearance by Jimmy Lennon, a much loved sports announcer at the Olympic Auditorium in Los Angeles for a celebration of twenty-five years of televised wrestling.

Enrique later moved with his third wife Kata Calgary, Alberta, Canada. In 2006, a Japanese reporter visited Calgary, Canada to meet and interview Enrique one last time. Enrique remains highly respected and revered as part of the Japan Wrestling Association where he wrestled the Japanese Sumobasho circuit in the 1960s. His success came for his skills, talent, good looks and a convergence of technology and the need for television content in what later became a multi-billion-dollar market. Those were the days of real wrestling. He used to say, "that these cauliflower ears didn't come from sleeping on hard hotel pillows, as well as his knee, back and other injuries sustained in the arena ring. It was called the arena, as a left over from the days of gladiatorial combat, arena means "the sand" in Latin.

In 2010, Torres was voted into the Southern California Pro-Wrestling Hall of Fame by a special committee that looked at pre-1980 wrestlers.

== Personal life ==
Torres was married to Maria in 1938. They had one daughter, Helen, born in December 1939. They also had a son, Enrique (Tony), born in November 1940. Later Torres married Rachel in 1950. They had two sons; Allan Enrique, born April 1952, and Jim (James), born June 1956. Enrique married Kata in 1963; Kata and he later moved to Canada ultimately to reside in Calgary, Alberta, Canada, they were married for 44 years. In his later years Enrique was on kidney dialysis in addition to receiving a kidney transplant in 2006, then suffered a stroke. On September 10, 2007 he died as a resident of the Carewest George Boyack Nursing Home in Calgary.

== Championships and accomplishments ==
- 50th State Big Time Wrestling
  - NWA United States Heavyweight Championship (Hawaii version) (1 time)
  - NWA Hawaii Tag Team Championship (1 time) - with Alberto Torres
- California State Athletic Commission
  - World Heavyweight Championship (Los Angeles version) (2 times)
- Central States Wrestling
  - NWA Central States Heavyweight Championship (2 times)
  - NWA United States Heavyweight Championship (Central States version) (1 time)
- Georgia Championship Wrestling
  - NWA Georgia Southern Tag Team Championship (10 times) - with Alberto Torres (6) and Ramon Torres (4)
  - NWA World Tag Team Championship (Georgia version) (5 times) - with Alberto Torres (2) and Ramon Torres (3)
- Mid-Atlantic Championship Wrestling
  - NWA Southern Tag Team Championship (Mid-Atlantic version) (1 time) - with George Becker
- NWA All-Star Wrestling
  - NWA Canadian Tag Team Championship (Vancouver version) (1 time) - with Bearcat Wright
- NWA Hollywood Wrestling
  - NWA American Heavyweight Championship (Los Angeles version) (1 time)
- NWA San Francisco
  - NWA Pacific Coast Heavyweight Championship (San Francisco version) (4 times)
  - NWA Pacific Coast Tag Team Championship (San Francisco version) (6 times) - with Gino Garibaldi (1 time), Leo Nomellini (1 time), Ramon Torres (1 time), Ron Etchinson (2 times), and Sandor Kovacs (1 time)
  - NWA World Tag Team Championship (San Francisco version) (8 times) - with Leo Nomellini (2 times), Johnny Barend (1 time), Bobo Brazil (2 times), Ronnie Etchison (1 time), Rip Miller (1 time), and Reggie Parks (1 time)
- Southern California Pro-Wrestling Hall of Fame
  - Class of 2010
- NWA Southwest Sports, Inc.
  - NWA Texas Tag Team Championship (1 time) - with Alberto Torres
