= Leo Nomellini =

Italian-American football player and wrestler (1924–2000)

- Nomellini in 1961

No. 42, 73
- Position: Defensive tackle

Personal information
- Born: June 19, 1924; Lucca, Tuscany, Italy
- Died: October 17, 2000 (aged 76); Stanford, California, U.S.
- Listed height: 6 ft 3 in (1.91 m)
- Listed weight: 259 lb (117 kg)

Career information
- High school: Crane Tech (Chicago, Illinois)
- College: Minnesota (1946–1949)
- NFL draft: 1950: 1st round, 11th overall pick

Career history
- San Francisco 49ers (1950–1963)

Awards and highlights
- 6× First-team All-Pro (1951–1954, 1957, 1959); 3× Second-team All-Pro (1960–1962); 10× Pro Bowl (1950–1953, 1956–1961); NFL 1950s All-Decade Team; NFL 50th Anniversary All-Time Team; San Francisco 49ers Hall of Fame; San Francisco 49ers No. 73 retired; Unanimous All-American (1948); Consensus All-American (1949); Second-team All-American (1947); 3× First-team All-Big Nine (1947–1949)

Career NFL statistics
- Games played: 174
- Starts: 166
- Sacks: 13.5
- Safeties: 2
- Fumble recoveries: 13
- Total touchdowns: 1
- Military career
- Allegiance: United States
- Branch: U.S. Marine Corps
- Conflicts: World War II
- Stats at Pro Football Reference
- Pro Football Hall of Fame
- College Football Hall of Fame

Leo Joseph Nomellini (June 19, 1924 – October 17, 2000) was an Italian-American professional football player and professional wrestler. He played college football for the Minnesota Gophers and was selected by the San Francisco 49ers in the first round of the 1950 NFL draft. He played 14 seasons as a defensive tackle in the National Football League (NFL), all of them with the 49ers, playing his first three years as an offensive tackle as well.

Nomellini was a seven-time tag team champion in wrestling for two different versions.

He was inducted into the Pro Football Hall of Fame in 1969 and to the College Football Hall of Fame in 1977.

== Early life ==
Nomellini was born at Lucca, Tuscany, Italy, and immigrated to the United States as an infant to Minnesota, before later moving to Chicago, Illinois, where he attended Crane High School. After high school, he joined the Marine Corps. It was there that in 1942, he first started playing football.

== College career ==
After the war, he received a football scholarship to the University of Minnesota, where he became a two-time All-American and the 49ers' first NFL draft choice in 1950. Nomellini was also an All-American for the Minnesota Golden Gophers track and field team, finishing 7th in the hammer throw at the 1948 NCAA track and field championships. While at Minnesota, Nomellini was a member of Delta Chi fraternity.

== Professional career ==
Nomellini was the first ever NFL draft selection of the San Francisco 49ers (formerly of the All-America Football Conference), who selected him in the 1st round as the 11th overall pick of the 1950 NFL draft. As a professional, he appeared in 174 regular-season games and started 166 for his 14-year career.

While with the 49ers, he played both offensive and defensive tackle, winning All-Pro honors at both positions. He was selected to the All-NFL team six times: two years on offense and four years on defense. "He was as strong as three bulls," said 49ers teammate Joe Perry. "He'd slap you on the back and knock you twenty feet." He was selected as the defensive tackle on the NFL 50th Anniversary All Time Team.

== Professional wrestling ==
=== NWA San Francisco and Hawaii ===
During the off-season Nomellini often wrestled professionally as Leo "The Lion" Nomellini debuting in Minnesota in 1950. For his career, he was a 10-time tag team champion. He won his first tag team championship in NWA San Francisco on March 14, 1952, when he teamed with Hombre Montana. The duo defeated Ben and Mike Sharpe for the NWA World Tag Team Championship (San Francisco version). Four months later, Nomellini and Gino Garibaldi won the NWA Pacific Coast Tag Team Championship. In April 1953, Nomellini regained the NWA Pacific Coast Tag Team Championship while teaming with Enrique Torres when they defeated Fred and Ray Atkins. Nomellini and Torres defeated the Mike and Ben Sharpe on May 6, 1953, for the NWA World Tag Team Championship (San Francisco version). On May 11, 1954, Nomellini teamed with Rocky Brown to defeat the Sharpes and win the NWA World Tag Team Championship (San Francisco version). In 1957, Nomellini, again teaming with Torres, defeated Lord James Blears and Ben Sharpe for the NWA World Tag Team Championship (San Francisco version).

While working for the National Wrestling Alliance, Nomellini once defeated Lou Thesz in a two-out-of-three falls match, but was not awarded the NWA World Heavyweight Championship because the first fall was a disqualification.

Also Nomellini wrestled in Hawaii where he feuded with Gene Kiniski.

=== NWA Minneapolis Wrestling and Boxing Club/American Wrestling Association ===
Nomellini would leave NWA San Francisco to head to Minnesota to work for Verne Gagne and the NWA Minneapolis Wrestling and Boxing Club.

On May 15, 1958, Nomellini, teaming with Verne Gagne defeated Mike and Doc Gallagher for the NWA World Tag Team Championship (Minneapolis version). He would win the title again on July 14, 1959, while teaming with Butch Levy and defeated Karol and Ivan Kalmikoff. He would win it for the last time on July 19, 1960, once again teaming with Gagne and defeating Stan Kowalski and Tiny Mills.

Nomellini won his final professional wrestling championship on May 23, 1961, when he and Wilbur Snyder defeated Gene Kiniski and Hard Boiled Haggerty for the AWA World Tag Team Championship.

He retired from wrestling in 1965 in Hawaii.

== Death and legacy ==
Nomellini died on October 17, 2000, after suffering a stroke.

Nomellini was named to the NFL's all-time team as a defensive tackle. In 1969, he was inducted into the Pro Football Hall of Fame and in 1977, the College Football Hall of Fame.

== Championships and accomplishments ==
- George Tragos/Lou Thesz Professional Wrestling Hall of Fame
  - Class of 2008
- NWA Minneapolis Wrestling and Boxing Club - American Wrestling Association

- AWA World Tag Team Championship (1 time) - with Wilbur Snyder
- NWA World Tag Team Championship (Minneapolis version) (3 times) - with Verne Gagne (2) and Butch Levy (1)

- NWA San Francisco

- NWA World Tag Team Championship (San Francisco version) (4 times) - with Hombre Montana (1), Enrique Torres (2), and Rocky Brown (1)

== See also ==
- List of gridiron football players who became professional wrestlers
