= Roy Shire =

American wrestler (1921–1992)

Personal information
- Born: Roy P. Shropshire; December 17, 1921 Georgetown, Kentucky, U.S.
- Died: September 24, 1992 (aged 70) Sebastopol, California, U.S.

Professional wrestling career
- Ring name(s): Roy Shire; Silver Adonis; Roy Shires
- Billed height: 5 ft 10 in (178 cm)
- Billed weight: 238 lb (108 kg)
- Debut: 1950
- Retired: 1961

Roy Shropshire (December 17, 1921 – September 24, 1992) was an American professional wrestler and promoter who worked for Big Time Wrestling in San Francisco from 1961 to its closure in 1981.

== Professional wrestling career ==
Shire began his professional wrestling career in 1950 in Ohio. Throughout his career he worked in many territories. His most title wins were in Texas. In 1957, Shire worked in New York City for Capitol Wrestling Corporation. It was there in 1959, he met Ray Stevens as Ray Shire and formed the tag team the Shire Brothers. On August 6, 1959, the brothers won the NWA World Tag Team Championship from Dick the Bruiser and Angelo Poffo. The Shire Brothers were involved in many famous angles until Roy moved on to become the promoter of Big Time Wrestling wrestling programs in San Francisco's Cow Palace.

One angle, which took place in Indianapolis on October 1, 1960, involved a "match" between boxer Archie Moore, a former World Light Heavyweight Boxing Champion, and the Shire Brothers. This match did not show Ray and Roy having any significant advantage over Moore. For one thing, the Shire Brothers were required to wear boxing gloves and follow the rules of boxing when they went against professional boxer Moore. Both Ray and Roy were "knocked out" in a matter of minutes. This match did not settle the argument as to who is the superior athlete, the professional boxer or the professional wrestler. A positive outcome of this "match" was the fans, who attended this event in large numbers, having the pleasure of seeing the long-awaited comeuppance of the arrogant and rule-breaking Shire Brothers.

After sustaining a severe knee injury, NWA San Francisco wrestler "Professor" Roy Shire decided to move into promoting in direct competition with Malcewicz. In October 1960, Shire registered the Pacific Coast Athletic Corp. with the California State Athletic Commission over Malcewicz's objections. Big Time Wrestling was an "outlaw" promotion that did not respect the territorial boundaries decreed by the NWA.

Shire would later begin producing a second weekly show, Big Time Wrestling this one airing on KOVR. Big Time Wrestling was originally hosted by Harris, then later by Hank Renner.

Shire would ultimately prevail and NWA San Francisco folded in 1962.

Big Time Wrestling promoted shows throughout the San Francisco Bay Area. Its base was the Cow Palace, where it held shows each Friday. Together with his bookers, Johnny Doyle and later Red Bastien, Shire built the promotion around the principles of "action, high spots and realistic matches". Shire positioned Ray Stevens as the promotion's main heel.

In August 1968, Big Time Wrestling became a member of the NWA. Shire served as vice-president of the organisation for a period in the early-1970s.

KTVU cancelled Big Time Wrestling in 1970. In 1970, Shire secured a new deal with the Sacramento station KTXL, airing Big Time Wrestling at 19:00 PST on Saturday evenings. The show featured Hank Renner as play-by-play announcer. He was later joined by Pepper Martin as color commentator.

In 1980, Shire suffered a heart attack. A burned out Shire retired from promoting in January 1981 after Verne Gagne's American Wrestling Association, through local promoter and former wrestler Leo Nomellini, moved into San Francisco. Shire's final show was a battle royal at the Cow Palace that reportedly drew $64,000 (equivalent to $227,000 in 2025). In 1984, a disgruntled Shire gave an interview to The Sacramento Bee in which he broke kayfabe by acknowledging all the matches he promoted were staged.

== Personal life ==
Shire retired in Sebastopol, California at his Toe Hold Ranch. He died on September 24, 1992, from a heart attack at 70.

== Championships and accomplishments ==
- American Wrestling Alliance
  - AWA Indiana World Tag Team Championship (2 times) - with Ray Shire
- Southwest Sports, Inc.
  - NWA Texas Tag Team Championship (1 time) – with Great Scott (1 time)
- Western States Sports
  - NWA North American Heavyweight Championship (Amarillo version) (1 time)
  - NWA World Junior Heavyweight Championship (2 times)
- Wrestling Observer Newsletter
  - Wrestling Observer Newsletter Hall of Fame (Class of 2009)
