= NWA San Francisco =

Defunct American wrestling promotion

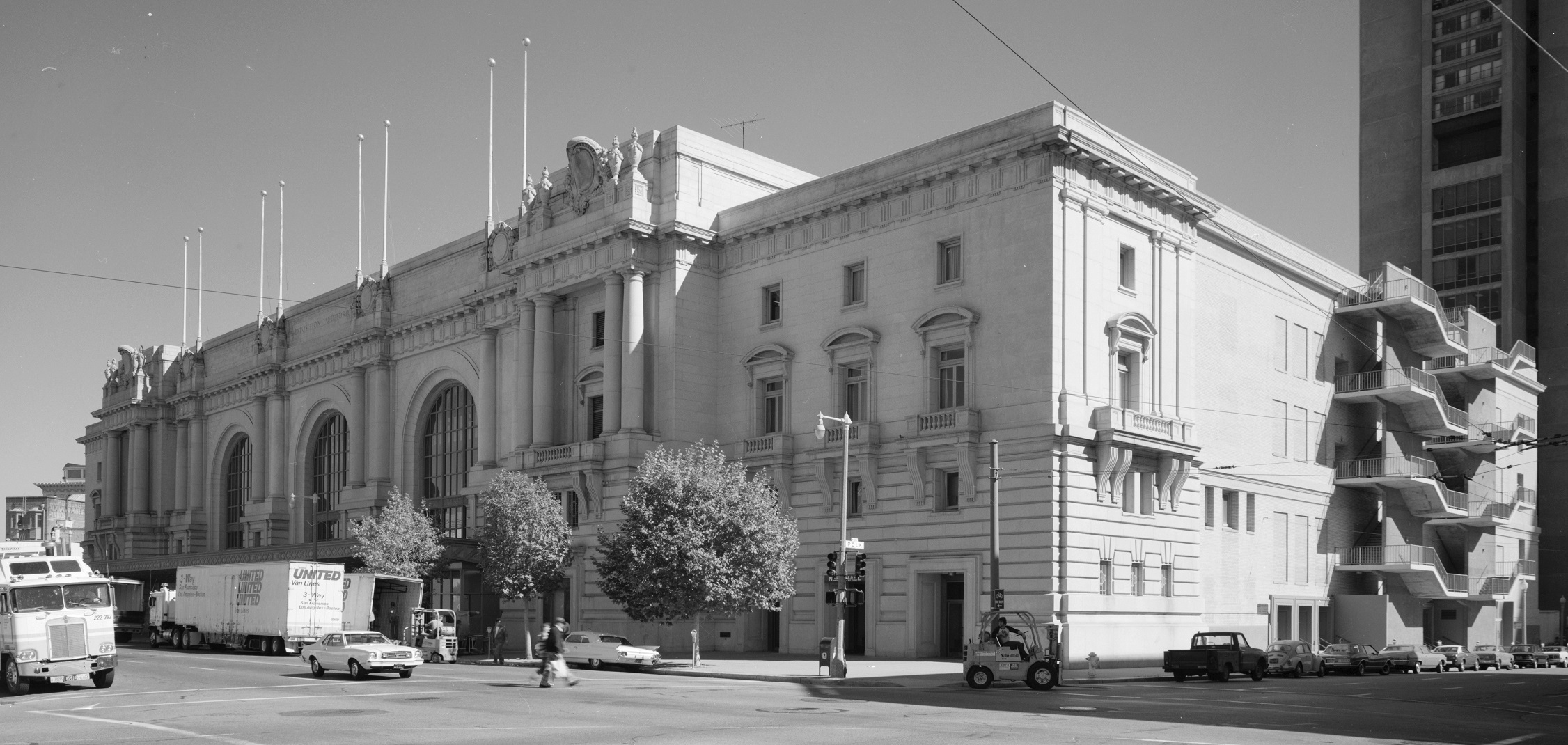
- The San Francisco Civic Auditorium, the home of NWA San Francisco.
- Founded: November 1935
- Defunct: 1961
- Headquarters: San Francisco, California, United States
- Founder: Joe Malcewicz
- Owner: Joe Malcewicz
- Parent: San Francisco Booking Office

NWA San Francisco was a professional wrestling promotion headquartered in San Francisco, California in the United States. Founded in 1935 by "The Utica Panther" Joe Malcewicz (1897–1962), the promotion joined the National Wrestling Alliance in 1949. It traded until 1961, when it folded due to competition from the upstart Big Time Wrestling promotion. The promotion's heartland was San Francisco, with the San Francisco Civic Auditorium as its core venue, but it also ran shows in other Northern Californian cities including Fresno, Oakland, Richmond, Sacramento, San Jose, Santa Rosa, Stockton, and Vallejo.

== History ==
"The Utica Panther" Joe Malcewicz was born on March 17, 1897, in Utica, New York. He had his first recorded professional wrestling bout in 1914 and challenged for the World Heavyweight Wrestling Championship on several occasions in the 1920s. He retired from professional wrestling at the age of 38 and moved to promoting. In November 1935, he succeeded Jack Ganson as the leaseholder of San Francisco's New Dreamland Auditorium, buying out Ganson's interest for $15,000 (equivalent to $344,000 in 2024) after Paul Bowser and Toots Mondt convinced him to step aside. He held his first show on November 26, 1935. Malcewicz subsequently entered into an agreement with Dan Kolov that gave him exclusive rights to promote wrestling events in a dozen towns and cities in Northern California and Nevada.

On November 26, 1949, Malcewicz joined the newly-formed National Wrestling Alliance. His promotion became NWA San Francisco, the NWA affiliate for San Francisco, giving Malcewicz an effective monopoly over professional wrestling in the area. He remained a member until 1962, although his membership briefly lapsed in 1956–1957 when he was late signing paperwork. Over the course of his membership, Malcewicz sat on both the board of directors and the NWA World Heavyweight Championship committee.

In 1950, Malcewicz created the NWA World Tag Team Championship (San Francisco version), the second regional NWA World Tag Team Championship. Malcewicz built a strong tag team division, with the top stars including brothers Ben and Mike Sharpe, who held the championship on 18 occasions.

In 1951, Malcewicz and 50th State Big Time Wrestling promoter Al Karasick organized the "Shriners" tour of Japan. Malcewicz and Karasick built a strong relationship with Rikidōzan and his Japan Wrestling Association, with the promotions trading wrestlers across the Pacific. In May 1956, the Sharpe Brothers briefly lost the San Francisco version of the NWA World Tag Team Championship to Koukichi Endo and Rikidōzan during a tour of Japan. Bouts between the Sharpe Brothers and Rikidōzan provided a patriotic outlet for citizens of occupied Japan, with the Sharpe Brothers using villainous tactics against the heroic Rikidōzan, who would inevitably rally to defeat them, drawing chants of "Long live Japan!"

Malcewicz regularly recruited athletes from other sports in an attempt to create new stars. Crossover athletes appearing with NWA San Francisco during the 1950s included strongman Doug Hepburn and National Football League players Art Michalik, Gene Lipscomb, Leo Nomellini, and Cy Williams.

After sustaining a severe knee injury, NWA San Francisco wrestler "Professor" Roy Shire decided to move into promoting in direct competition to Malcewicz, defying the territorial boundaries decreed by the NWA. In October 1960, he registered the Pacific Coast Athletic Corp. with the California State Athletic Commission over Malcewicz's objections. In response to the threat posed by Shire's Big Time Wrestling promotion, Malcewicz – who had long resisted the emergence of televised wrestling, fearing it would compete with live events – begun running shows each Monday night on KTVU in 1961, as well as moving from the Civic Auditorium to the Kezar Pavilion as a cost-cutting measure. Despite this, Shire prevailed in the short territorial battle, with his roster – built around the flamboyant aerial performer Ray Stevens – proving more popular than the slower-moving heavyweights who made up Malcewicz's roster, and Malcewicz folded NWA San Francisco in 1961. He died on April 20, 1962, of a heart attack.

== Championships ==
Championship	Created	Abandoned	Notes
NWA World Tag Team Championship (San Francisco version)	1950	1961	The San Francisco version of the NWA World Tag Team Championship was created in 1950 when Hard Boiled Haggerty and Ray Eckert were announced as the inaugural champions. The championship was abandoned in 1961 when NWA San Francisco ceased trading.
Pacific Coast Heavyweight Championship (San Francisco version)	1936	1961	The original Pacific Coast Heavyweight Championship was created in 1916. In 1936, the championship was introduced to NWA San Francisco, with Billy Hanson crowned the inaugural champion after winning a tournament. The championship was abandoned in 1961 when NWA San Francisco ceased trading.
Pacific Coast Junior Heavyweight Championship (San Francisco version)	1935	1953	The Pacific Coast Junior Heavyweight Championship was created in 1935 when Pete Belcastro won a tournament. The championship was abandoned in 1953.
Pacific Coast Tag Team Championship (San Francisco version)	1950	1961	The Pacific Coast Tag Team Championship was created in 1950 when Ben Sharpe and Mike Sharpe were named as the inaugural champions. The championship was abandoned in 1961 when NWA San Francisco ceased trading.
San Joaquin Valley Tag Team Championship	1954	1956	The San Joaquin Valley Tag Team Championship, also known as the Central California Championship, was created in 1954 when Ben Sharpe and Bud Curtis were announced as the inaugural champions. The championship was abandoned in 1956.

== Alumni ==
- Fred Atkins
- Johnny Barend
- Lord James Blears
- Bobo Brazil
- Primo Carnera
- Dean Detton
- Emil Dusek
- Ernie Dusek
- Gorgeous George
- Hard Boiled Haggerty
- Doug Hepburn
- Gene Kiniski
- Killer Kowalski
- Lord Athol Layton
- Gene Lipscomb
- Wild Bill Longson
- Great Lothario
- Bobby Managoff
- Earl McCready
- Danny McShain
- Art Michalik
- Bill Miller
- Ed Miller
- Bronko Nagurski
- Leo Nomellini
- Rikidōzan
- Buddy Rogers
- Frank Sexton
- Ben Sharpe
- Mike Sharpe
- Sándor Szabó
- Chris Tolos
- John Tolos
- Enrique Torres
- Mike Valentino
- Dick Warren
- Cy Williams
- Yukon Eric
