= Von Steigers =

Professional wrestling tag team

Tag team
- Members: Kurt Von Steiger; Karl Von Steiger (died 2022)
- Name(s): Kurt and Karl von Steiger; The Von Steigers; The Von Steiger brothers
- Billed heights: 5 ft 10 in (1.78 m) - Karl; 5 ft 10 in (1.78 m) - Kurt
- Combined billed weight: 470 lb (210 kg)
- Hometown: Gladstone, Manitoba
- Billed from: Germany
- Debut: 1959
- Disbanded: 1990

Kurt and Karl Von Steiger were the ring names of Canadian professional wrestlers Lorne Corlett (died November 8, 2022) and Arnold Pastrick. The Von Steiger gimmick was that of two German villains, called heels, despite them hailing from Gladstone, Manitoba. Arnold Pastrick used the name Kurt Von Steiger, and Lorne Corlett worked as Karl Von Steiger. The Von Steigers are best known for competing in Pacific Northwest Wrestling in Portland, Oregon, between 1968 and 1973 but also competed in Tennessee, San Francisco, Stampede Wrestling, Australia, the American Wrestling Alliance and the Carolina territory.

== Professional wrestling history ==
Arnold Pastrick made his professional wrestling debut in 1959 in his native Winnipeg, Manitoba, and worked for the local Madison Wrestling Club promotion as a solid mid-card face. Lorne Corlett made his debut in 1960, working for the Madison Wrestling Club under the ring name "Butcher Boy" Corlett. In 1965, Corlett won the MWC Heavyweight Championship and held it for over 6 months. When the Madison Wrestling Club folded in 1968, the two men formed a tag team and adopted a German gimmick — not an overtly Nazi ring persona, but instead playing off the imagery of World War I Germany complete with spiked helmets. The gimmick was a strange choice for Pastrick because his parents were Polish and had been held in a Concentration camp during World War II.

=== Von Steigers ===
The Von Steigers first became noticed as a team in the Calgary, Alberta-based Stampede Wrestling, where they won the Stampede Wrestling International Tag Team Championship in 1967, their first title as a team. After working in the Stampede Territory for a while, the duo moved on, leaving Canada to begin working for the promotion most synonymous with the Von Steigers, NWA Pacific Northwest in Portland. In Portland, the team really came into their own and they found success as the Von Steigers; the fans despised the duo, and the partners quickly rose up the card. Their fellow wrestlers held the team in great respect because they were good "ring generals", in other words they were good at controlling the flow of the match, keeping the pre-planned story on track. While working in Portland, the Von Steigers engaged in several storylines with other Portland based teams, such as The Royal Kangaroos ("Lord" Jonathan Boyd and Norman Frederick Charles III) and the team of Tony Borne and Moondog Mayne. The Von Steigers held the NWA Pacific Northwest Tag Team Championship seven times, defeating such teams as Moondog Mayne and Beauregarde, Billy White Wolf and Johnny War Eagle and the pairing of Tony Borne and Moondog Mayne. Kurt Von Steiger also saw singles success in Portland, winning and holding the NWA Pacific Northwest Heavyweight Championship briefly in 1970 and again in 1971. In early 1971, Portland territory owner Don Owen and Mad Dog Vachon, who were close friends, planned to have the Vachon Brothers (Butcher and Mad Dog) lose the AWA World Tag Team Championship to the Von Steigers. Although the Von Steigers won the championship, the title change was never officially recognized by the AWA. The problem was that the Vachons had not gotten permission from American Wrestling Association (AWA) owner Verne Gagne to lose the titles to the Von Steigers. The Vachons lost the AWA titles to the Von Steigers on February 23, 1971, and then went on a tour of the Orient; when they returned three weeks later, the Vachons "regained" the titles on a technicality.

The team kept working for NWA Pacific Northwest but also did the occasional tour of other promotions, such as the NWA Mid-Pacific promotion in Hawaii. On September 10, 1969, the Von Steigers defeated Pedro Morales & Ed Francis for the NWA Hawaii Tag Team Championship, but lost the title belts back to Morales and Francis a month later. In 1971 the team toured Australia working for the Australian version of World Championship Wrestling, where they defeated King Curtis Iaukea and Mark Lewin for the IWA World Tag Team Championship and held the titles until they were replaced with the NWA Austra-Asian Tag Team Championship. In 1972 Kurt Von Steiger bought a share of a wrestling promotion in Phoenix, Arizona, and decided to settle down there. Karl Von Steiger, on the other hand, decided to keep on traveling the world while wrestling, which led to the Von Steigers splitting up.

=== Singles career - Kurt Von Steiger ===
Kurt Von Steiger remained in Phoenix and took part in running the local wrestling promotion called "Universal Wrestling Federation" (later changed to "Universal Wrestling Alliance") and also training people to become professional wrestlers. In 1973 Von Steiger defeated Chris Colt to win the UWF Arizona Heavyweight Championship. In Arizona Von Steiger trained several notable wrestlers; Bobby Jaggers, "Big" Bill Anderson and Afa Anoa'i of The Wild Samoans. After the Phoenix promotion folded Kurt Von Steiger returned to the NWA Pacific Northwest promotion where he held the NWA Pacific Northwest Tag Team Championship two more times, with Killer Karl Krupp and Mati Suzuki. He later retired from wrestling and started up a septic tank business in Oregon.

=== Singles career - Karl Von Steiger ===
Karl briefly worked in Phoenix and held the UWA Western States Tag Team Championship with Tito Montez, losing it to Chris Colt and one of Kurt Von Steiger's students Bobby Jaggers, who worked as Bobby Mayne at the time. After leaving the Phoenix Territory he started working in Dory Funk's NWA Western States territory based out of Amarillo, Texas. In 1972 Von Steiger teamed up with Ciclón Negro to win the NWA Western States Tag Team Championship, a title he would also hold in 1974, this time with Siegfried Stanke. Karl also won the NWA Western States Heavyweight Championship from Terry Funk and held it for six months before losing it to Ricky Romero. In April 1973 Killer Karl Krupp chose Kurt Von Steiger to replace Fritz Von Erich as one half of the NWA International Tag Team Championship in Japan Wrestling Association. When the promotion closed shortly after Von Steiger and Krupp took the belts with them to Texas and gave them to Dory Funk to use. In 1974 Karl Von Steiger engaged in a prolonged storyline with future World Champion Bob Backlund centering on the Western States Heavyweight Championship. Von Steiger would win the title from Backlund on two occasions in 1974.

In 1975 Von Steiger moved on to Alabama, where he began to work for Nick Gulas' NWA Mid-America territory. In NWA Mid-America Von Steiger would team with another "German", Otto Von Heller, like Steiger he too was only pretending to be German. The team defeated George Gulas and Jackie Fargo to win the NWA Mid-America Tag Team Championship on May 26, 1975. Soon after, the team of Von Steiger and Von Heller defeated Fargo and Gulas once again, this time for the NWA Mid-America U.S. Tag Team Championship and held it until August 1975 when they lost to the team of Tojo Yamamoto and Tommy Rich. The team's biggest success came when they won NWA Mid-America's main tag team title, the NWA Mid-America Southern Tag Team Championship from the team of Jimmy Golden and Tojo Yamamoto, a title they would win once more in 1975. After breaking up with Von Heller Karl worked various other southern territories, never settling down in one particular place long enough.

Karl died on November 8, 2022, at 88 years old.

=== Von Steiger reunion ===
In 1977 the Von Steigers reunited for one more run as a tag team. They worked in the NWA San Francisco territory where they won the vacant San Francisco version of the NWA World Tag Team Championship in a tournament. They would lose the titles to longtime rival Moondog Mayne and local star Ray Stevens but quickly regained the titles. On January 12, 1978, the Von Steigers lost the titles for good as the team of Black Gordman and Goliath defeated them. Following the loss Kurt Von Steiger retired while Karl wrestled for another couple of years, semi-retiring at the end of 1979, but would return for tours of All Japan during 1980, 1981, 1984, 1986, and 1987.

== Championships and accomplishments ==
=== Kurt and Karl Von Steiger ===
- Big Time Wrestling (San Francisco)

- NWA World Tag Team Championship (San Francisco version) (2 times)

- NWA Mid-Pacific

- NWA Hawaii Tag Team Championship (1 time)

- Pacific Northwest Wrestling

- NWA Pacific Northwest Tag Team Championship (7 times)

- Stampede Wrestling

- Stampede International Tag Team Championship (1 time)

- World Championship Wrestling (Australia)

- IWA World Tag Team Championship (3 times)

=== Kurt Von Steiger and Arnold Pastrick ===
Titles won as a team are not listed here

- Eastern Sports Association

- ESA International Tag Team Championship (1 time) - with Fred Sweetan

- NWA Western States Sports

- NWA Western States Tag Team Championship (1 time) - with Tito Montez

- Pacific Northwest Wrestling

- NWA Pacific Northwest Heavyweight Championship (2 times)
- NWA Pacific Northwest Tag Team Championship (2 times) - with Killer Karl Krupp (1), and Mati Suzuki (1)

- Universal Wrestling Federation (Arizona)

- UWF Arizona Heavyweight Championship (1 time)

- UWA/WSWA

- UWA/WSWA Western States Tag Team Championship (1 time) - with Tito Montez

=== Karl Von Steiger and Lorne Corlett ===
Titles won as a team are not listed here

- Japan Wrestling Association

- NWA International Tag Team Championship (1 time) - with Killer Karl Krupp

- Madison Wrestling Club

- MWC Heavyweight Championship (1 time)

- NWA Mid-Pacific

- NWA Hawaii Heavyweight Championship (1 time)

- NWA Mid-America

- NWA Mid-America Tag Team Championship (1 time) - with Otto von Heller
- NWA Mid-America Southern Tag Team Championship (2 times) - with Otto von Heller
- NWA United States Tag Team Championship (Mid-America version) (1 time) - with Otto von Heller

- NWA Western States Sports

- NWA Western States Heavyweight Championship (3 times)
- NWA Western States Tag Team Championship (4 times) - with Hans Mueller (1), Ciclón Negro (1), The Patriot (1) and Zeigfried Steinke (1)
