= Bobby Jaggers =

American professional wrestler

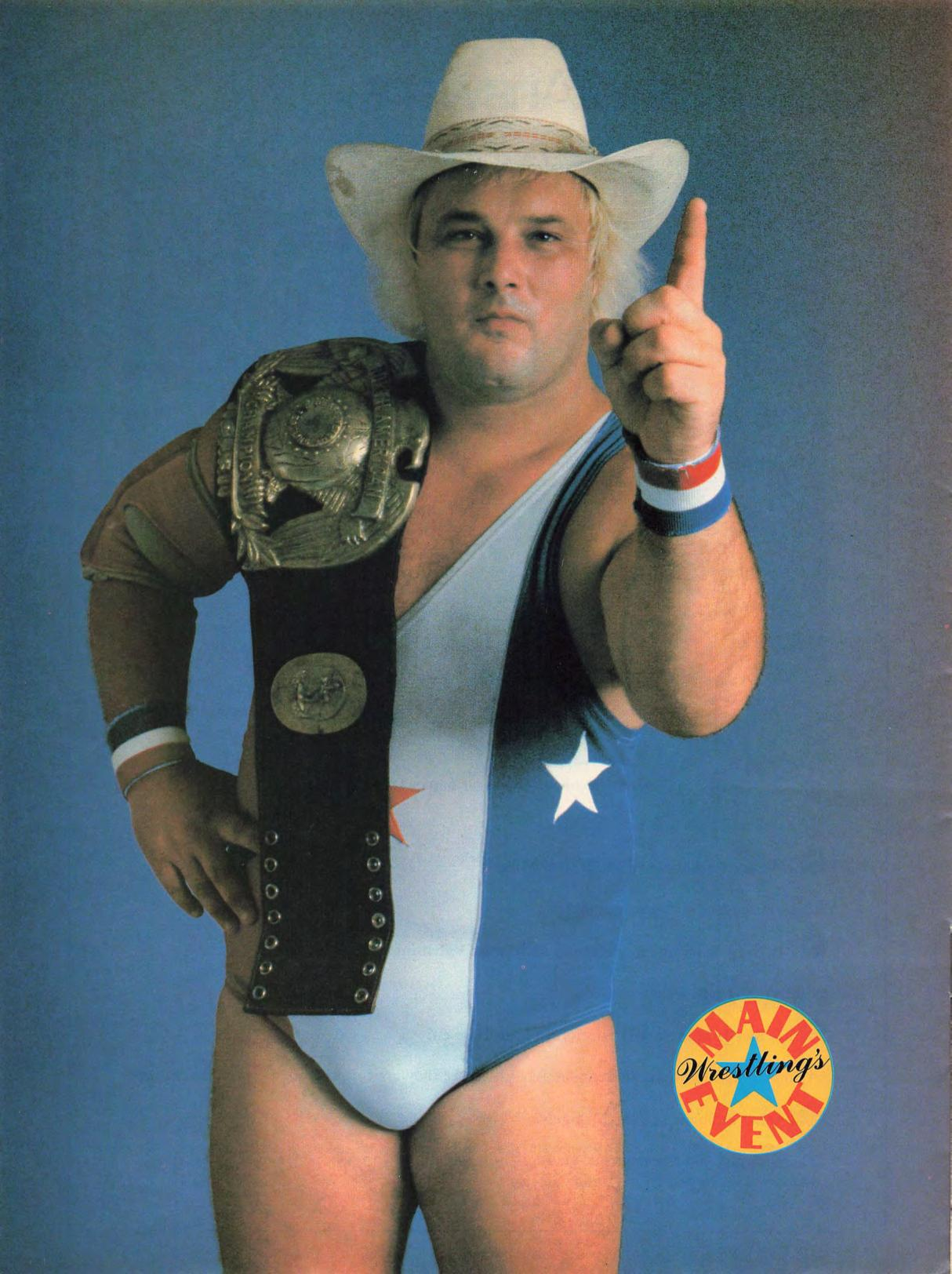
- Jaggers with the WWC North American Heavyweight Championship in 1982

Personal information
- Born: January 8, 1948 Vancouver, Washington, U.S.
- Died: September 30, 2012 (aged 64)
- Education: Kansas State University
- Children: 3

Professional wrestling career
- Ring name(s): Bobby Jaggers; Bobby Mayne; Dr. Death
- Billed height: 6 ft 2 in (188 cm)
- Billed weight: 263 lb (119 kg)
- Billed from: Dunlap, Kansas, U.S.
- Trained by: Tito Montez; Kurt Von Steiger
- Debut: 1972
- Retired: 1991
- Military service
- Allegiance: United States
- Branch: Army
- Unit: 1st Battalion, 30th Field Artillery Regiment
- Conflicts: Vietnam War (Tet Offensive)

Robert Francis Jeaudoin (January 8, 1948 – September 30, 2012) was an American professional wrestler and civil engineer, also known by the ring name of "Hangman" Bobby Jaggers.

Most of his renown as a wrestler came from his appearances in various National Wrestling Alliance-affiliated promotions. In particular, he found his greatest success in Championship Wrestling from Florida and Pacific Northwest Wrestling, the latter near his hometown of Vancouver, Washington. His wrestling gimmick was of a cowboy from Kansas, where he spent the later years of his life.

== Early life ==
Jeaudoin was born in Vancouver, Washington, where he attended Hudson's Bay High School.

In December 1966, Jeaudoin joined the United States Army and spent a year and a half in Vietnam. He was in the "A" Battery of the 1st Battalion, 30th Field Artillery Regiment, and fought in battles in Huế, Khe Sanh, A Sầu Valley, and the Tet Offensive.

Upon leaving the Army, Jeaudoin worked at a Nabisco cookie factory in Washington, until he met Sandy Barr, whom he credited for saving his life. Jeaudoin suffered after Vietnam, so when Barr asked him if he wanted to be a wrestler, he immediately said yes.

== Professional wrestling career ==
=== Early career (1972–1977) ===
Debuting under the name "Bobby Mayne" (after his favorite wrestler Lonnie Mayne) in 1972 in the Pacific Northwest against Al Madril, Bobby Jaggers learned his craft. Soon after debuting, he moved to Memphis, where he teamed with Charlie Fulton and was managed by Sir Steve Clements. In 1973, he moved to Kansas City, where he caught the eye of Dory Funk, Jr., who wanted him in his Amarillo territory, in which he did split his time between the two territories.

In 1975, after a brief stint in San Francisco, he went to Louisiana to work for Bill Watts, where he formed a team with Jerry Brown. He later moved up to Canada in Vancouver, working for Al Tomko and All-Star Wrestling, but didn't last long, as he left after a falling-out with Gene Kiniski. He then moved down to Atlanta for Georgia Championship Wrestling, where he teamed up with Sterling Golden, who would go on to become one of the most iconic wrestlers in the world, Hulk Hogan. He would also wrestle in Knoxville for while, before moving down to Florida.

=== Peak years (1977–1988) ===
It was in Florida, where Bobby Jaggers found his niche. He feuded with Dusty Rhodes all over the territory. During that time, he would wrestle on and off for World Wrestling Council in Puerto Rico, wrestle eighteen tours of Japan, and some shows in South Africa.

In 1984, he went to Portland for Don Owen and Pacific Northwest Wrestling. While there, he won four Heavyweight titles and two Tag Team titles, with one partner each, before leaving for the Mid-Atlantic area ran by Jim Crockett Promotions. While there, he formed his well-known tag team The Kansas Jayhawks with Dutch Mantel. In 1986, they lost to Ivan Koloff and Krusher Khrushchev in a tournament final to determine the inaugural NWA United States Tag Team Champions. Jaggers would remain in JCP until 1988.

=== Late career (1988–1991) ===
By 1988, Bobby Jaggers wrestled actively in Puerto Rico for WWC. But on July 16, 1988, one incident changed his life forever. After a show, Bruiser Brody was murdered in the shower in the locker room. Jaggers was in the heel locker room when Brody was in the face locker room. The murder made him slowly phase his career out, before finally retiring in 1991.

In fall of 1989, Jaggers made two appearances in the WWE losing to Jim Neidhart and a tag team against The Rockers (Marty Jannetty and Shawn Michaels).

In 1989 Bobby Jaggers teamed with Black Bart and were called the Southern Force in the FCW/PWF and held the tag team titles one time after beating the Nasty Boys in St Petersburg Fl. Then Jaggers and Black Bart lost the title to Dustin Rhodes and Mike Graham in Tampa Bay Fl. The FCW/PWF was being booked and run by Dusty Rhodes, until Dusty left for WWE. FCW/PWF closed down in 1991.

== Engineering career ==
After retiring from professional wrestling, Bobby Jaggers studied civil engineering at Kansas City University and took classes at Butler County Community College. He worked as an engineering technician for the state of Kansas. By 2007, he became a road and bridge specialist for the Department of Homeland Security for Kansas. By the time of his death, he was working for the Federal Emergency Management Agency as a road and bridge specialist for disaster relief projects.

== Death ==
Jaggers died on September 30, 2012, in Covington, Louisiana, from renal failure after a prolonged period of ill health from Hepatitis C, which he had contracted while serving in the Vietnam War. He was buried in the Dunlap Cemetery with full military honors.

== Championships and accomplishments ==
- Central States Wrestling
  - NWA Central States Tag Team Championship (2 time) - with Moondog Moretti (1) and Brad Batten (1)
  - NWA Central States Television Championship (1 time)
  - NWA World Tag Team Championship (1 time) - with Randy Tyler
- Championship Wrestling from Florida
  - NWA Florida Heavyweight Championship (1 time)
  - NWA Florida Tag Team Championship (1 time) - with R.T. Tyler
  - NWA Southern Heavyweight Championship (Florida version) (1 time)
- Continental Wrestling Association
  - AWA Southern Heavyweight Championship (1 time)
- Florida Championship Wrestling
  - FCW Tag Team Championship (1 time) - with Black Bart
- NWA All-Star Wrestling
  - NWA Canadian Tag Team Championship (Vancouver version) (1 time) - with Chris Colt
- NWA Tri-State
  - NWA Brass Knuckles Championship (Tri-State version)
  - NWA United States Tag Team Championship (Tri-State version) (1 time) - with Jerry Brown
- Pacific Northwest Wrestling
  - NWA Pacific Northwest Heavyweight Championship (4 times)
  - NWA Pacific Northwest Tag Team Championship (2 times) - with Rip Oliver (1) and David Sierra (1)
- Pro Wrestling Illustrated
  - Ranked No. 415 of the 500 top singles wrestlers during the "PWI Years" in 2003
- Ring Around The Northwest Newsletter
  - Wrestler of the Year (1985)
- Southwest Championship Wrestling
  - SCW Southwest Heavyweight Championship (1 time)
  - SCW Southwest Tag Team Championship (2 times) with - Luke Williams (1) and Buddy Moreno (1)
- Universal Wrestling Federation (Arizona)
  - UWF Western States Tag Team Championship (1 time) - with Chris Colt
- Western States Sports
  - NWA Western States Heavyweight Championship (1 time)
  - NWA Western States Tag Team Championship (1 time) - with Randy Tyler
- World Wrestling Council
  - WWC Caribbean Tag Team Championship (2 times) - with Dan Kroffat
  - WWC North American Heavyweight Championship (1 time)
  - WWC Puerto Rico Heavyweight Championship (1 time)
