= Pepper Martin (actor) =

Canadian actor (1936–2022)

- Born: Howard Martin; September 20, 1936; Hamilton, Ontario, Canada
- Died: March 18, 2022 (aged 85)
- Occupations: Actor, wrestler
- Years active: 1968-1990
- Children: 2 Professional wrestling career
- Ring name(s): Howard Martin; The Mask; Pepper Martin
- Billed weight: 224 lb (102 kg)
- Trained by: Al Spittles
- Debut: 1957
- Retired: 1975

Howard Martin (September 20, 1936 – March 18, 2022), known as Pepper Martin, was a Canadian-American actor and professional wrestler.

== Early life ==
Martin was born in Hamilton, Ontario. In 1944, when he was seven years old, "his parents went out for a night of dinner and dancing at the local Moose Hall. The festivities took place in a second-floor room that became a death trap when an arsonist set fire to the only stairwell. His father wrapped his mother in drapes to protect her and was opening a window that provided access to a nearby tree when the panicked crowd rushed at him and accidentally pushed him out the window and into the tree. The next day, his father sent him and older sister Eileen to an aunt's farm for a week. On the car ride back, he unceremoniously presented them with an article rehashing the gruesome details of that night and conveying the news of their mother's death."

At 16, Martin lied about his age and joined the Navy. "I was a big kid for my age ... [then] they found out how old I really was and kicked me out". He had been dating his future wife already and they were married July 21, 1956, when Martin was 19 years old. The union produced two daughters.

He took a job at Westinghouse in Hamilton, and a chance to play with the Hamilton Tigers football club came up. Needing to get in better shape, and rehab his knee, a friend directed Martin to a gym run by Al Spittles. The gym happened to be where local wrestlers trained and Pepper soon fell in with them, learning the sport.

== Professional wrestling career ==
Martin debuted in 1957. In his first match, he teamed with Bolus against Johnny Evans (later Reggie Love) and Bull Johnson (father of "Bullwhip" Danny Johnson). Martin would live out of Windsor as he traveled the Detroit territory. He would leave for the Tennessee area and quickly return to Detroit, before going to work for Jim Barnett's Indianapolis territory, which had just opened in 1959. Even though he was still a preliminary wrestler, Pepper began making real money at this point, sometimes over $1,000 a night in the big arenas.

Martin moved his family to the States to work for Leroy McGuirk's Tulsa, Oklahoma, office in the 1960s and soon made good friends with his future tag partner and ring general, Al Lovelock. They worked out of New Orleans for a year; Pepper described the travel as "horrendous". They eventually made their way to Texas, where Pepper was stabbed by a fan. Returning home to Ontario to recoup, he later returned to Texas, but this time as a babyface (wrestling jargon for "good guy"). Over the next couple of years he would work in Minneapolis, Vancouver, and St. Louis before getting a phone call from Roy Shire, the promoter out of San Francisco. It was the call that would change his life by bringing him to the West Coast and his future on the silver screen.

One weekend while wrestling in between San Francisco and Los Angeles, wrestler-turned-actor Woody Strode invited Pepper to Hollywood for a late night romp. They ended up waking director John Ford up at three in the morning, being ejected from his lawn and then drinking until eight o'clock with Hollywood tough guy Lee Marvin. Pepper would later befriend John Ford and even spend Sundays swimming at his house. It was also while working in Los Angeles that wrestling legend Freddie Blassie would give Martin the chance to commentate the matches with Dick Lane, something that he attributes to helping him in his future acting career. Then disaster struck Martin's life.

During a 1962 match in Long Beach, Martin broke his back. The doctor discovered a small vertical crack in his spine, but denying surgery, Martin had a pallet made up that he would lie on for the next six weeks to keep his back straight and allow it to heal. Come June 1962, he was better and intending to return to Canada when Dick Beyer, who had worked as The Destroyer, suggested he go to the Pacific Northwest territory where a babyface was needed. Talking on the phone to promoter Don Owen (who was the first to ever put professional wrestling on television), Pepper decided to get outrageous with his pay, saying he'd do it for 10% of the gate. "I'll stay six weeks. If I get over, I'll stay. If I don't get over, that's my notice, and I want ten percent". Owen agreed, and what followed was the most successful run of Pepper Martin's wrestling career.

In the NWA Pacific Northwest territory, Pepper became a multiple time champion, but continued in his role as commentator, calling matches in Portland, Seattle, Tacoma and Eugene. Officially, Martin was an NWA Pacific Northwest Heavyweight Champion five times, exchanging the title with other wrestling legends Stan Stasiak, Mad Dog Vachon, Paul Jones, Tony Borne and the aforementioned Patterson. Martin also became an eight time NWA Pacific Northwest Tag Team Champion with Shag Thomas (4x), Luther Lindsay (2x), Paul Jones and Billy White Wolf.

== Acting career ==
Martin's first feature film was the 1968 film Angels from Hell. He also appeared in Walking Tall (1973), The Longest Yard (1974), Live A Little, Steal A Lot (1975), the slasher Scream (1981) and the horror comedy Return to Horror High (1987).

He may be best known for his role as the truck driver, Rocky, who beats up a depowered Superman - and is later beaten up by a repowered Superman - in the 1980 sequel Superman II. Martin's TV appearances include Police Woman, The Mod Squad, I Dream of Jeannie, The Incredible Hulk, Mannix, and The Rockford Files.

The play The Time of Your Life was revived on March 17, 1972, at the Huntington Hartford Theater in Los Angeles with Martin, Henry Fonda, Richard Dreyfuss, Ron Thompson, Gloria Grahame, Lewis J. Stadlen, Strother Martin, Richard X. Slattery and Jane Alexander among the cast with Edwin Sherin directing.

== Championships and accomplishments ==
- NWA Hollywood Wrestling
  - NWA Beat The Champ Television Championship (2 times)
  - NWA Pacific Coast Brass Knuckles Championship (1 time)
- Pacific Northwest Wrestling
  - NWA Pacific Northwest Heavyweight Championship (5 times)
  - NWA Pacific Northwest Tag Team Championship (7 times)

== Filmography ==
Year	Title	Role	Notes
1968	Angels from Hell	Dennis	
1968	If He Hollers, Let Him Go!	Prison Guard	
1968	I Dream of Jeannie	Killer Culligan	Episode: The Strongest Man in the World
1968	Bonanza	Hawkface	Episode: Yonder Man
1968	The Wrecking Crew	Frankie	
1970	The Animals	Jamie	
1971	Mission: Impossible	Batesly	Episode: The Tram
1973	Walking Tall	Zolan Dicks	
1973	Cahill U.S. Marshal	Hard Case	
1974	The Longest Yard	Shop Steward	
1974	Gone with the West	Mimmo's Men	
1975	Murph the Surf	Sgt. Terwilliger	
1975	Murder on Flight 502	Bomb Man	TV Movie
1976-1979	The Rockford Files	Various Roles	Appeared in 7 episodes
1976	Starsky & Hutch	Oxey	2 episodes
1978	The Incredible Hulk	Coach Haggerty	Episode: Killer Instinct
1978	Hawaii Five-O	Jim Nelson	
1980	Superman II	Rocky	
1981	Scream	Bob	
1983	Quincy, M.E.	Ed Rayano	Episode: Suffer the Little Children
1982	CHiPs	Gus	Episode: Speedway Fever
1984	T.J. Hooker	Big Guy	Episode: Night Vigil
1986	Bad Guys	Ringside Commentator	
1986	Ghost Fever	Sheriff Clay	
1987	Return to Horror High	Chief Deyner	
1988	Evil Altar	Collector	
1989	Mutant on the Bounty	Captain Llyodes	
1990	They Came from Outer Space	George	Episode: Mr. Geek
