= Billy Jack Haynes =

American professional wrestler

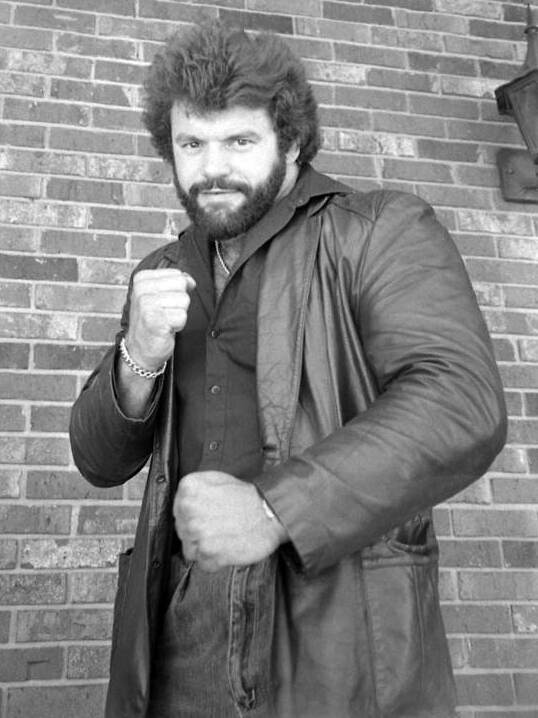
- Haynes in 1984

Personal information
- Born: William Albert Haynes III; July 10, 1953 (age 73) Portland, Oregon, U.S.
- Spouses: Lady Blossom (m. 1983; div. 1984) Janette Becraft (m. 2022; died 2024)

Professional wrestling career
- Ring name(s): Billy Jack; Billy Jack Haynes; Billy Haynes; Black Blood
- Billed height: 6 ft 3 in (191 cm)
- Billed weight: 246 lb (112 kg)
- Billed from: Portland, Oregon "A little town in France" (as Black Blood); Tucson, Arizona
- Trained by: Stu Hart
- Debut: 1982
- Retired: 1996

William Albert Haynes III (born July 10, 1953) is an American retired professional wrestler, better known by the ring name Billy Jack Haynes.

== Professional wrestling career ==
=== Early career (1982–1984) ===
Haynes started wrestling in 1982 at the age of 28. He trained in Stu Hart's Dungeon pro wrestling school and briefly wrestled in Hart's Stampede Wrestling under his given name, forming a tag team with Bruce Hart. He started using the ring name "Billy Jack" in the Pacific Northwest, inspired by the titular "unhinged vigilante" character from the 1971 film of that name, but a threat of legal action forced him to change it. He added his real last name to the gimmick and continued to work as a babyface. Jim Cornette perpetuated a rumor that Haynes served time for manslaughter before becoming a pro wrestler.

=== Florida and Pacific Northwest (1984–1986) ===
Haynes feuded heavily with Rip Oliver until 1984 when he had a run in Championship Wrestling from Florida where he feuded with Kendo Nagasaki for the NWA Florida Heavyweight Championship winning the title from him. They then had a brief run in World Class Championship Wrestling in 1985, managed by Sunshine. Due to internal conflict between Fritz Von Erich and Billy, he was written out of the organization, jobbing to Rip Oliver in a plot where Rip bloodied and injured Billy. During this time, he faced the debuting Shawn Michaels.

Haynes started splitting his time between Portland Wrestling and CWF, and he wrestled with partner Wahoo McDaniel. They won the NWA Florida United States Tag Team Championship and they feuded with Ole Anderson and Arn Anderson in Jim Crockett Promotions. He had just begun a feud with The Barbarian over who was the strongest man in the territory when he abruptly left the company after a confrontation with Jim Crockett in his office which became physical.

=== World Wrestling Federation (1986–1988) ===
In June 1986, Haynes went to the World Wrestling Federation (WWF) and feuded with Randy Savage over the WWF Intercontinental Championship.

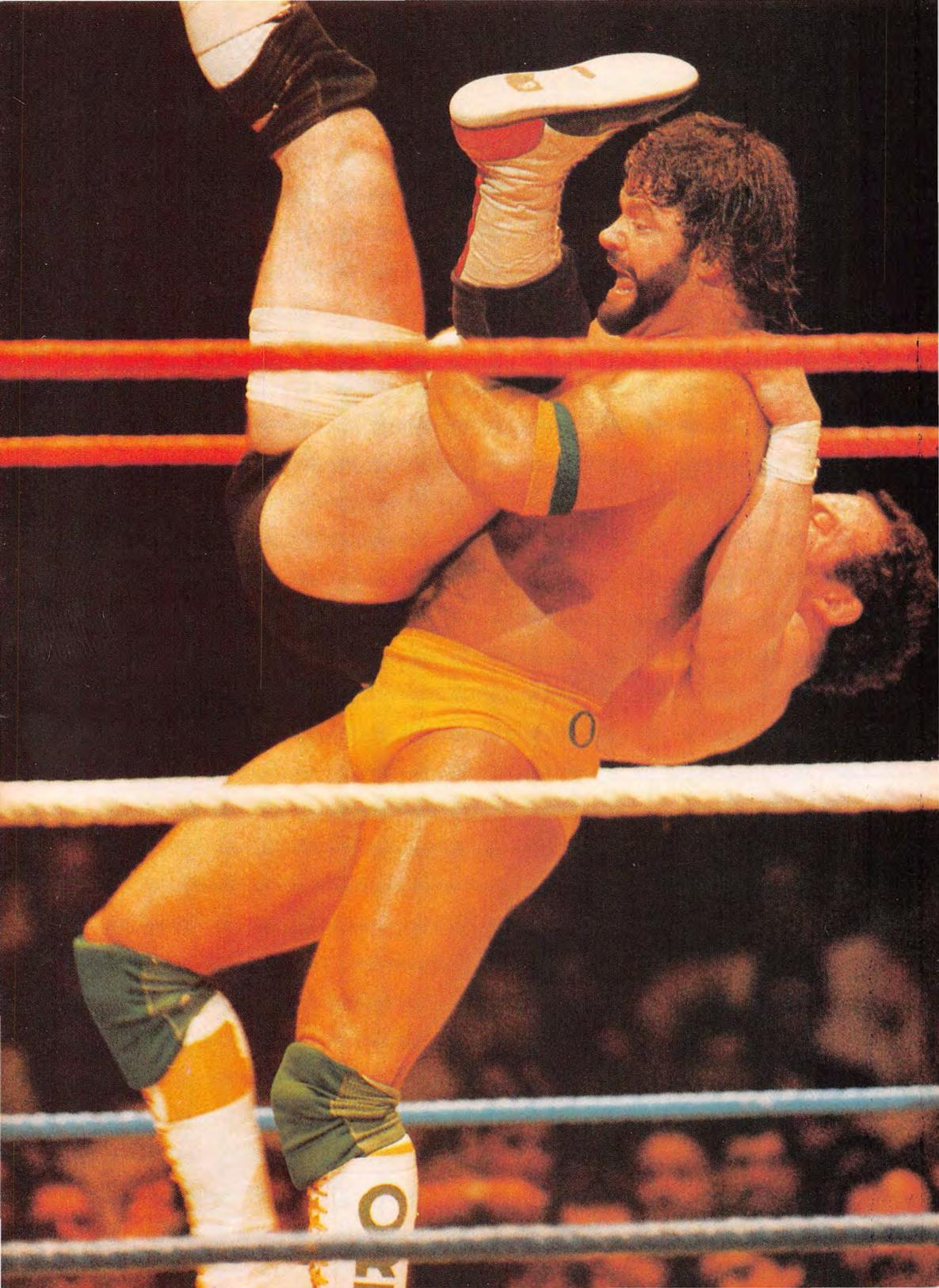
Haynes (front) dropping Hercules Hernandez (back) with a sidewalk slam, circa 1987

Haynes later feuded with Hercules Hernandez over who was stronger, more muscular, and who had a better version of the full nelson (their mutual finishing maneuver). Their feud in the WWF peaked with what was dubbed "The Battle of the Full Nelsons" at WrestleMania III, where the two men battled to a double count-out. After the bell, Hercules' manager Bobby Heenan kneed Haynes in the back while he had Hercules in a full nelson out on the floor. Haynes chased Heenan into the ring where Hercules blindsided him with his trademark chain, hitting Haynes multiple times and (kayfabe) cutting his forehead (in reality, Haynes had bladed himself with a small razor hidden in the tapes around his wrists after the first hit. He was actually seen on camera taking the razor out of his wrist tapes while chasing Heenan around the ring). In the months to follow, the two had a series of "chain matches," where they were attached at the wrist by a foot long chain which could also be used as a weapon during the match.

Haynes later teamed with fellow Oregon native Ken Patera who had returned to the WWF. Haynes saved Patera from a beating at the hands of Hercules and Harley Race after Patera's return match. The pair later feuded with Demolition after a television match where Demolition left Haynes, Patera, and Brady Boone (who played Haynes' cousin) beaten and lying in the ring.

Haynes' departure from the WWF in January 1988 has been a subject of controversy considering dramatic changes in the story as Haynes repeated it. In one version, he says he quit the WWF after refusing to do a job in his hometown of Portland, Oregon. Another account of the same incident reported that he actually wrestled the match with the finish reworked and then was fired afterwards. The May 7, 2025 episode of Dark Side of the Ring revealed that the true reason for his release was that he overdosed on pills during a flight, and the company did not want to risk keeping him and dealing with the negative publicity he might bring.

=== Late career (1988–1996) ===
Haynes returned to Oregon in 1988 and wrestled in independents, including his own short-lived Oregon Wrestling Federation. In the summer of 1989, he returned to Portland and immediately feuded with The Grappler. By the end of the year, he formed an alliance with former rival Rip Oliver and his son Larry. On April 14, 1990, he turned on the Olivers during a match with The Grappler, The Equalizer, and Brian Adams, turning heel. As a heel, he feuded with the Olivers, Scott Norton, and Scotty the Body.

In October 1990, Haynes did several shows for Herb Abrams' Universal Wrestling Federation, where they built another strongman feud between Haynes and Ken Patera.

In May 1991, Haynes returned to a major promotion when he appeared under a mask in World Championship Wrestling as "Black Blood" in Kevin Sullivan's stable. Soon after The Great American Bash, he was fired due to a pay dispute.

Haynes had suffered a severe knee injury shortly before his release, but instead of taking time off to recuperate he instead returned to Portland, where he feuded with Steve Doll and Demolition Crush. After PNW closed in 1992, Haynes took time off to recover from the knee injury he suffered in WCW, which took 18 months. His first matches back were in June 1994, where he wrestled shows that were co-promoted by PNW's successor Championship Wrestling USA and Mexico's Asistencia Asesoría y Administración in Vancouver, Washington. He showed up next in the United States Wrestling Association in 1995 and retired in 1996.

== Personal life ==
On March 16, 2013, Haynes was hospitalized because he was suffering from an aortic aneurysm as well as liver and kidney issues.

In October 2014, the Portland Tribune reported that Haynes filed a lawsuit in federal court against WWE, alleging "egregious mistreatment of its wrestlers for its own benefit, as well as its concealment and denial of medical research and evidence concerning traumatic brain injuries suffered by WWE wrestlers." This litigation was taken after research into chronic traumatic encephalopathy (CTE), which was attributed to causing the deaths of Chris Benoit in 2007 and Andrew Martin in 2009. Haynes also sought for the court to grant class action status for hundreds of former wrestlers and to force WWE to establish a medical trust fund to pay for wrestlers who suffer from injuries that took place in a WWE ring. In March 2016, the suit was dismissed by Judge Vanessa Lynne Bryant. At the time of dismissal, dozens of former WWE wrestlers had joined a class action lawsuit while being represented by the same attorney, Konstantine Kyros. Bryant dismissed the other lawsuits in 2018, the United States Court of Appeals for the Second Circuit rejected subsequent appeals, and the Supreme Court of the United States declined to hear the case in 2021.

== 2024 arrest and murder charge ==
On February 8, 2024, Haynes was arrested in Portland, Oregon following a two-hour standoff with police after a shooting. He was questioned by police regarding the death of his wife, Janette Becraft, who was 85 years old at the time of her death and suffering from dementia. Haynes was charged with second-degree murder and unlawful use of a weapon on February 28, and made his first court appearance the following day. His trial was initially set to begin on April 11, but was delayed for Haynes's team to have more time for investigation and preparation. In May 2025, the judge determined that Haynes was "mentally unfit" to proceed with the case. Haynes was transferred to Oregon State Hospital for further evaluation and treatment pending a determination of competency to proceed with legal proceedings. After the ruling, Becraft's estate filed a lawsuit against Haynes for alleged elder abuse.

Haynes was found fit to stand trial in February 2026, with his trial date set for April 26, 2027, through May 7, 2027.

== Championships and accomplishments ==
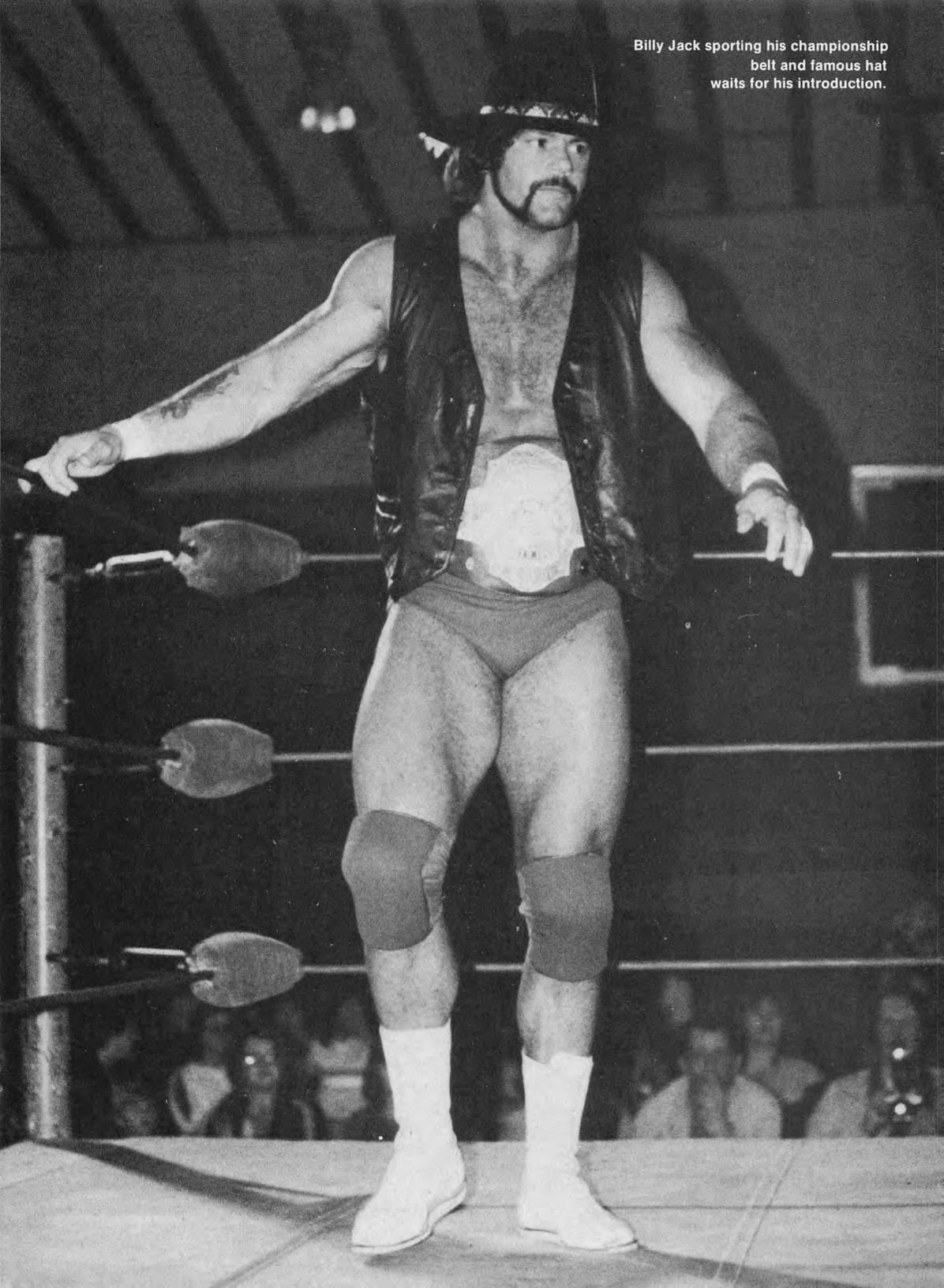
Haynes was a five-time NWA Pacific Northwest Heavyweight Champion

- Championship Wrestling from Florida
  - NWA Florida Heavyweight Championship (1 time)
  - NWA United States Tag Team Championship (Florida version) (1 time) - with Wahoo McDaniel
- Oregon Wrestling Federation
  - OWF Heavyweight Championship (2 times)
- Pacific Northwest Wrestling
  - NWA Pacific Northwest Heavyweight Championship (5 times)
  - NWA Pacific Northwest Tag Team Championship (3 times) - with Stan Stasiak (2 times) and Ricky Vaughn (1 time)
- Pro Wrestling Illustrated
  - PWI Most Improved Wrestler of the Year (1984)
  - PWI ranked him #143 of the top 500 singles wrestlers of the "PWI Years" in 2003
- United States Wrestling Association
  - USWA Southern Heavyweight Championship (2 times)
- World Class Championship Wrestling
  - WCCW Television Championship (1 time)
