= NWA Pacific Northwest Tag Team Championship =

Professional wrestling tag team championship

- NWA Pacific Northwest Tag Team Championship belt

Details
- Promotion: Pacific Northwest Wrestling
- Date established: November 17, 1952
Statistics
- First champions: Harold Sakata and Toi Yamamoto
- Most reigns: Tony Borne and Moondog Mayne

The NWA Pacific Northwest Tag Team Championship was a professional wrestling championship sanctioned by the National Wrestling Alliance and defended in its member promotion Pacific Northwest Wrestling, which promoted shows in the U.S. states of Oregon and Washington.

The original version of the title lasted from 1952 until the company's closure in 1992, when Don Owen retired and sold his company to Sandy Barr. Barr retired all NWA PNW titles with Owen and began operating under the company name "Championship Wrestling USA", creating new championships. In 1993, the belts were used to represent the AAA/IWC World Tag Team Championship until it was deactivated in 1994. The actual retired (Owen Era) NWA Pacific Northwest Tag Team Championship belts were kept by Sandy Barr, refurbished due to age and were being used by the International Grappler's Alliance, his wrestling organization. With Sandy Barr's passing, Josh Barr started PDX Pro Wrestling in St. Johns, Oregon, in 2007, which is using the original PNW Tag Team belts. They were reactivated in 2015 in St John's NWA Blue Collar Wrestling and would be deactivated again in 2018.

== Title history ==
Key
| No. | Overall reign number |
| Reign | Reign number for the specific champion |
| Days | Number of days held |

| No. | Champion | Championship change | | | Reign statistics | | Notes | Ref. |
| No. | Champion | Date | Event | Location | Reign | Days | Notes | Ref. |
|---|---|---|---|---|---|---|---|---|
| 1 | Harold Sakata and Toi Yamamoto | November 17, 1952 | PNW Show | (Note: The location of the match was not captured as part of the known documentation for the championship change.) | 1 | 38 | | |
| 2 | Kurt Von Poppenheim and John Cretorian | December 25, 1952 | PNW Show | | 1 | 15 | | |
| 3 | Harold Sakata and Toi Yamamoto | January 9, 1953 | PNW Show | | 2 | 346 | | |
| 4 | David Jones and Carl Engstrom | December 21, 1953 | PNW Show | | 1 | 21 | | |
| 5 | Ivan Gorky and Soldat Gorky | January 11, 1954 | PNW Show | | 1 | 343 | | |
| 6 | Kurt Von Poppenheim (2) and Leo Wallick | December 20, 1954 | PNW Show | | 1 | 99 | | |
| 7 | Bulldog Curtis and Tommy Martinez | March 29, 1955 | PNW Show | | 1 | 0 | | |
| 8 | Bulldog Curtis and Tommy Martinez | March 29, 1955 | PNW Show | | 1 | 14 | | |
| 9 | Luther Lindsay and George Dussette | March 15, 1955 | PNW Show | | 1 | 88 | | |
| 10 | Doug Donovan and Ivan Kameroff | June 11, 1955 | PNW Show | | 1 | 44 | | |
| 11 | Luigi Macera and Gory Guerrero | July 25, 1955 | PNW Show | | 1 | 32 | | |
| 12 | Doug Donovan and Ivan Kameroff | August 26, 1955 | PNW Show | | 2 | 24 | | |
| 13 | Luigi Macera (2) and Dick Torio | September 19, 1955 | PNW Show | | 1 | 31 | | |
| 14 | Bill Savage and Buck Weaver | October 20, 1955 | PNW Show | | 1 | 71 | | |
| 15 | Kurt Von Poppenheim (3) and Henry Lenz | December 30, 1955 | PNW Show | | 1 | N/A | | |
| 16 | Kurt Von Poppenheim (4) and Jack O'Reilly | 1956 | PNW Show | | 1 | N/A | | |
| 17 | Herb Freeman and Larry Chene | May 7, 1956 | PNW Show | | 1 | 20 | | |
| 18 | Doug Donovan (3) and Red Donovan | May 27, 1956 | PNW Show | | 1 | 33 | | |
| 19 | Herb Freeman (2) and Pepper Gomez | June 29, 1956 | PNW Show | | 1 | 30 | | |
| 20 | Bulldog Curtis (2) and Henry Lenz (2) | July 29, 1956 | PNW Show | | 1 | 58 | | |
| 21 | Red Bastien and Andre Drapp | September 25, 1956 | PNW Show | | 1 | N/A | | |
| 22 | Red Bastien (2) and Roy Heffernan | 1956 | PNW Show | | 1 | N/A | | |
| 23 | Ed Francis and Henry Lenz (3) | February 2, 1957 | PNW Show | | 1 | N/A | | |
| 24 | Ed Francis (2) and Bill Savage (2) | 1957 | PNW Show | | 1 | N/A | | |
| 25 | Herb Freeman (3) and Luigi Macera (3) | May 17, 1957 | PNW Show | | 1 | N/A | | |
| 26 | Herb Freeman (4) and Cowboy Carlson | 1957 | PNW Show | | 1 | N/A | | |
| 27 | Doug Donovan (4) and Red Donovan | August 7, 1957 | PNW Show | | 2 | 76 | | |
| 28 | Kurt Von Himmler and Juan Oinada | October 22, 1957 | PNW Show | | 1 | 72 | | |
| 29 | Herb Freeman (5) and Henry Lenz (4) | January 2, 1958 | PNW Show | | 1 | N/A | | |
| 30 | Herb Freeman (6) and Nick Kozak | 1958 | PNW Show | | 1 | N/A | | |
| 31 | Doug Donovan (5) and Bill Savage (3) | March 17, 1958 | PNW Show | | 1 | 50 | | |
| 32 | Nelson Royal and Black Hawk | May 6, 1958 | PNW Show | | 1 | 58 | | |
| 33 | Eric Pederson and Henry Lenz (5) | July 3, 1958 | PNW Show | | 1 | 64 | | |
| 34 | Ed Francis (3) and Tony Borne | September 5, 1958 | PNW Show | | 1 | 63 | | |
| 35 | Herb Freeman (7) and Seymour Freeman | November 7, 1958 | PNW Show | | 1 | 46 | | |
| 36 | Kurt Von Poppenheim (5) and Kurt Von Himmler (2) | December 23, 1958 | PNW Show | | 1 | 96 | | |
| 37 | Nick Kozak (2) and Al Kashey | March 29, 1959 | PNW Show | | 1 | 57 | | |
| 38 | Kurt Von Poppenheim (6) and Don Manoukian | May 25, 1959 | PNW Show | | 1 | 38 | | |
| 39 | Tony Borne (2) and Bill Savage (4) | July 2, 1959 | PNW Show | | 1 | 50 | | |
| 40 | Kurt Von Poppenheim (7) and Fritz Von Brauner | August 21, 1959 | PNW Show | | 1 | 74 | | |
| 41 | Ed Francis (4) and Herb Freeman (8) | November 3, 1959 | PNW Show | | 1 | N/A | | |
| 42 | Ed Francis (5) and Ed Sullivan | | PNW Show | | 1 | N/A | Ed Sullivan replaced Herb Freeman when he was unable to compete due to an injury | |
| 43 | Tony Borne (3) and Shag Thomas | March 28, 1960 | PNW Show | | 1 | 39 | | |
| 44 | Ed Francis (6) and Bill Savage (5) | May 6, 1960 | PNW Show | | 2 | 77 | | |
| 45 | Kurt Von Poppenheim (8) and Soldat Gorky (2) | July 22, 1960 | PNW Show | | 1 | 112 | | |
| 46 | Tony Borne (4) and Shag Thomas | November 11, 1960 | PNW Show | | 2 | 20 | | |
| 47 | Herb Freeman (9) and Nick Kozak (3) | December 1, 1960 | PNW Show | | 2 | 71 | | |
| 48 | Bill Savage (6) and Tito Kopa | February 10, 1961 | PNW Show | | 1 | 120 | | |
| 49 | Luther Lindsay (2) and Bing Ki Lee | June 10, 1961 | PNW Show | | 1 | 22 | | |
| 50 | Shag Thomas (3) and Don Manoukian (2) | July 2, 1961 | PNW Show | | 1 | 39 | | |
| 51 | Herb Freeman (10) and Luther Lindsay (3) | August 10, 1961 | PNW Show | | 1 | 59 | | |
| 52 | Herb Freeman (11) and Seymour Freeman (2) | October 8, 1961 | PNW Show | | 2 | 103 | | |
| 53 | King Iaukea and Haru Sasaki | January 19, 1962 | PNW Show | Portland, Oregon | 1 | 62 | | |
| 54 | Fritz Von Goering and Kurt Von Poppenheim (9) | March 22, 1962 | PNW Show | | 1 | 121 | | |
| 55 | Shag Thomas (4) and Luther Lindsay (4) | July 21, 1962 | PNW Show | | 1 | 62 | | |
| 56 | Fritz Von Goering (2) and Mad Dog Vachon | September 21, 1962 | PNW Show | | 1 | 79 | | |
| 57 | Shag Thomas (5) and Luther Lindsay (5) | December 9, 1962 | PNW Show | | 2 | N/A | | |
| — | Vacated | January 1964 | — | — | — | — | Championship vacated for undocumented reasons | |
| 58 | Jack Dalton and Jim Dalton | February 12, 1963 | PNW Show | Portland, Oregon | 1 | 113 | | |
| 59 | Shag Thomas (6) and Billy White Wolf | June 5, 1963 | PNW Show | Salem, Oregon | 1 | 27 | | |
| 60 | Ivan Kameroff (3) and Soldat Gorky (3) | July 2, 1963 | PNW Show | Salem, Oregon | 1 | 22 | | |
| 61 | Shag Thomas (7) and Luther Lindsay (6) | July 24, 1963 | PNW Show | Salem, Oregon | 3 | N/A | | |
| 62 | Shag Thomas (8) and Danny Hodge | 1963 | PNW Show | | 1 | N/A | Danny Hodge replaced Luther Lindsay when he was unable to compete due to an injury | |
| 63 | The Destroyer and Art Michalik | September 9, 1963 | PNW Show | Salem, Oregon | 1 | 128 | | |
| 64 | Shag Thomas (9) and Luther Lindsay (7) | January 15, 1964 | PNW Show | Salem, Oregon | 4 | 7 | | |
| 65 | The Destroyer and Art Michalik | January 22, 1964 | PNW Show | Salem, Oregon | 2 | 56 | | |
| 66 | Nick Bockwinkel and Nick Kozak (4) | March 18, 1964 | PNW Show | Salem, Oregon | 1 | 16 | | |
| 67 | The Destroyer and Art Michalik | April 3, 1964 | PNW Show | Salem, Oregon | 3 | 19 | | |
| 68 | Nick Bockwinkel and Nick Kozak (5) | April 22, 1964 | PNW Show | Salem, Oregon | 2 | N/A | Don Manoukian was filling in for Art Michalik | |
| 69 | Nick Bockwinkel (2) and Buddy Mareno | 1964 | PNW Show | | 1 | N/A | Buddy Mareno replaced Nick Kozak when he was unable to compete due to an injury | |
| 70 | Pat Patterson and Tony Borne (5) | June 17, 1964 | PNW Show | Salem, Oregon | 1 | 50 | | |
| 71 | Pepper Martin and Billy White Wolf (2) | August 6, 1964 | PNW Show | Salem, Oregon | 1 | N/A | | |
| 72 | Pepper Martin (2) and Luther Lindsay (8) | 1964 | PNW Show | | 1 | N/A | | |
| 73 | Pat Patterson (2) and The Hangman | September 18, 1964 | PNW Show | | 1 | 38 | | |
| 74 | Pepper Martin (3) and Luther Lindsay (9) | October 26, 1964 | PNW Show | | 2 | 91 | | |
| 75 | Mad Russian and El Sheeref | January 25, 1965 | PNW Show | | 1 | 56 | | |
| 76 | Pepper Martin (4) and Shag Thomas (10) | March 22, 1965 | PNW Show | | 1 | 91 | | |
| 77 | Stan Stasiak and Haru Sasaki (2) | June 21, 1965 | PNW Show | Portland, Oregon | 1 | 7 | | |
| 78 | Pepper Martin (5) and Shag Thomas (11) | June 28, 1965 | PNW Show | Portland, Oregon | 2 | 16 | | |
| 79 | Stan Stasiak (2) and Mad Russian (2) | July 14, 1965 | PNW Show | | 1 | 44 | | |
| 80 | Shag Thomas (12) and Armand Hussein | August 27, 1965 | PNW Show | | 1 | 62 | | |
| 81 | Shag Thomas (13) and Bearcat Wright | October 28, 1965 | PNW Show | | 1 | 70 | | |
| 82 | Stan Stasiak (3) and Mighty Ursus | January 6, 1966 | PNW Show | | 1 | 7 | | |
| 83 | Shag Thomas (14) and Bearcat Wright | January 13, 1966 | PNW Show | | 2 | 18 | | |
| 84 | Tony Borne (6) and Jay York | January 31, 1966 | PNW Show | | 1 | 48 | | |
| 85 | Bearcat Wright (3) and Billy White Wolf (3) | March 20, 1966 | PNW Show | | 1 | 59 | | |
| 86 | Tony Borne (7) and Prof. Hiro | May 18, 1966 | PNW Show | | 1 | 14 | | |
| 87 | Rene Goulet and Pepper Martin (6) | June 1, 1966 | PNW Show | | 1 | 56 | | |
| 88 | Mr. Fuji and Haru Sasaki (3) | July 27, 1966 | PNW Show | | 1 | 71 | | |
| 89 | Rene Goulet (2) and Shag Thomas (15) | October 6, 1966 | PNW Show | | 1 | 21 | | |
| 90 | Tony Borne (8) and Mr. Fuji (2) | October 27, 1966 | PNW Show | | 1 | 44 | | |
| 91 | Pepper Martin (7) and Shag Thomas (16) | December 10, 1966 | PNW Show | | 3 | 4 | | |
| 92 | Tony Borne (9) and Moondog Mayne | December 14, 1966 | PNW Show | | 1 | 44 | | |
| 93 | Pepper Martin (8) and Paul Jones | January 27, 1967 | PNW Show | | 1 | 41 | | |
| 94 | Tony Borne (10) and Moondog Mayne | March 9, 1967 | PNW Show | | 2 | 154 | | |
| 95 | Johnny Kostas and Jim Osborne | August 10, 1967 | PNW Show | | 1 | 15 | | |
| 96 | Tony Borne (11) and Moondog Mayne | August 25, 1967 | PNW Show | | 3 | 12 | | |
| 97 | Johnny Kostas (2) and Dean Ho | September 6, 1967 | PNW Show | | 1 | 16 | | |
| 98 | Tony Borne (12) and Moondog Mayne | September 22, 1967 | PNW Show | | 4 | 147 | | |
| 99 | Moondog Mayne (5) and Beauregard | February 16, 1968 | PNW Show | | 1 | 239 | Borne and Mayne split | |
| 100 | The Von Steigers (Kurt Von Steiger and Karl Von Steiger) | October 12, 1968 | PNW Show | | 1 | 45 | | |
| 101 | Billy White Wolf (4) and Johnny War Eagle | November 26, 1968 | PNW Show | | 1 | 29 | | |
| 102 | The Von Steigers (Kurt Von Steiger and Karl Von Steiger) | December 25, 1968 | PNW Show | | 2 | 52 | | |
| 103 | Shag Thomas (17) and Luther Lindsay (10) | February 15, 1969 | PNW Show | | 4 | 45 | | |
| 104 | The Von Steigers (Kurt Von Steiger and Karl Von Steiger) | April 1, 1969 | PNW Show | | 3 | 21 | | |
| 105 | Tony Borne (13) and Moondog Mayne (6) | April 22, 1969 | PNW Show | | 5 | 11 | | |
| 106 | The Von Steigers (Kurt Von Steiger and Karl Von Steiger) | May 3, 1969 | PNW Show | | 4 | 10 | | |
| 107 | Tony Borne (14) and Moondog Mayne (7) | May 13, 1969 | PNW Show | | 6 | 58 | | |
| 108 | Stan Stasiak (4) and Tony Marino | July 10, 1969 | PNW Show | | 1 | 14 | | |
| 109 | Tony Borne (15) and Moondog Mayne (8) | July 24, 1969 | PNW Show | | 7 | 135 | | |
| 110 | Beauregard (2) and Roger Kirby | December 6, 1969 | PNW Show | | 1 | 7 | | |
| 111 | Tony Borne (16) and Moondog Mayne (9) | December 13, 1969 | PNW Show | | 8 | 37 | | |
| 112 | The Von Steigers (Kurt Von Steiger and Karl Von Steiger) | January 19, 1970 | PNW Show | | 5 | 67 | | |
| 113 | Moondog Mayne (10) and Frankie Laine | March 27, 1970 | PNW Show | | 1 | 85 | | |
| 114 | Beauregard (3) and The Claw | June 20, 1970 | PNW Show | | 1 | 42 | | |
| 115 | Mr. Fuji (3) and Haru Sasaki (4) | August 1, 1970 | PNW Show | | 2 | 88 | | |
| 116 | Tony Borne (17) and Moondog Mayne (11) | October 28, 1970 | PNW Show | | 9 | 15 | | |
| 117 | Mr. Fuji (4) and Haru Sasaki (5) | November 12, 1970 | PNW Show | | 3 | 16 | | |
| 118 | Tony Borne (18) and Moondog Mayne (12) | November 28, 1970 | PNW Show | | 10 | 41 | | |
| 119 | The Von Steigers (Kurt Von Steiger (6) and Karl Von Steiger (6)) | January 8, 1971 | PNW Show | | 6 | 110 | | |
| 120 | Frankie Laine (2) and Bobby Nichols | April 28, 1971 | PNW Show | | 1 | 10 | | |
| 121 | The Von Steigers (Kurt Von Steiger and Karl Von Steiger) | May 8, 1971 | PNW Show | | 7 | 64 | | |
| 122 | Royal Kangaroos (Jonathan Boyd and Norman Frederick Charles III) | July 11, 1971 | PNW Show | | 1 | 12 | | |
| 123 | Frankie Laine (3) and Big Snuka | July 23, 1971 | PNW Show | Medford, Oregon | 1 | N/A | | |
| 124 | Royal Kangaroos (Jonathan Boyd and Norman Frederick Charles III) | 1971 | PNW Show | | 2 | N/A | | |
| 125 | Dutch Savage and Beauregard (4) | November 26, 1971 | PNW Show | | 1 | 21 | | |
| 126 | Royal Kangaroos (Jonathan Boyd and Norman Frederick Charles III) | December 17, 1971 | PNW Show | | 3 | 122 | | |
| 127 | Tony Borne (19) and Moondog Mayne (13) | April 17, 1972 | PNW Show | | 11 | 22 | | |
| 128 | Royal Kangaroos (Jonathan Boyd and Norman Frederick Charles III) | May 9, 1972 | PNW Show | | 4 | 39 | | |
| 129 | Dutch Savage (2) and Moondog Mayne (14) | June 17, 1972 | PNW Show | | 1 | 77 | | |
| 130 | Tony Borne (20) and The Skull | September 2, 1972 | PNW Show | | 1 | 42 | | |
| 131 | Dutch Savage (3) and Moondog Mayne (15) | October 14, 1972 | PNW Show | | 2 | 80 | | |
| 132 | Dutch Savage (4) and Steven Little Bear | January 2, 1973 | PNW Show | | 1 | 150 | | |
| 133 | Bull Ramos and Clay Spencer | June 1, 1973 | PNW Show | | 1 | 31 | | |
| 134 | Los Compadres (Al Madril and Jose Gonzales) | July 2, 1973 | PNW Show | | 1 | 40 | | |
| 135 | Bull Ramos (2) and Ripper Collins | August 11, 1973 | PNW Show | | 1 | 77 | | |
| 136 | Dutch Savage (5) and Jimmy Snuka (2) | October 27, 1973 | PNW Show | | 1 | 97 | | |
| 137 | Kurt Von Steiger (8) and Killer Karl Krupp | February 1, 1974 | PNW Show | | 1 | N/A | | |
| 138 | Kurt Von Steiger (9) and Mati Suzuki | 1974 | PNW Show | | 1 | N/A | | |
| 139 | Dutch Savage (6) and Jimmy Snuka (3) | March 22, 1974 | PNW Show | | 2 | 342 | | |
| 140 | Royal Kangaroos (Jonathan Boyd and Norman Frederick Charles III) | February 27, 1975 | PNW Show | | 5 | 301 | | |
| 141 | Dutch Savage (7) and Jimmy Snuka (4) | December 25, 1975 | PNW Show | | 3 | 107 | | |
| 142 | Jesse Ventura and Bull Ramos (3) | April 10, 1976 | PNW Show | | 1 | 56 | | |
| 143 | Royal Kangaroos (Jonathan Boyd and Norman Frederick Charles III) | June 5, 1976 | PNW Show | | 6 | 3 | | |
| 144 | Jesse Ventura and Bull Ramos (4) | June 8, 1976 | PNW Show | | 2 | 56 | | |
| 145 | Dutch Savage (8) and Jimmy Snuka (5) | August 3, 1976 | PNW Show | | 4 | 83 | | |
| 146 | Jesse Ventura (3) and Buddy Rose | October 25, 1976 | PNW Show | | 1 | 11 | | |
| 147 | Dutch Savage (9) and Jimmy Snuka (6) | November 5, 1976 | PNW Show | | 5 | 71 | | |
| 148 | Jesse Ventura (4) and Buddy Rose | January 15, 1977 | PNW Show | | 2 | 140 | | |
| 149 | Moondog Mayne (16) and Les Thornton | June 4, 1977 | PNW Show | | 1 | 64 | | |
| 150 | Ron Bass and John Anson | August 7, 1977 | PNW Show | | 1 | 111 | | |
| 151 | Ron Bass (2) and Moondog Mayne (17) | November 26, 1977 | PNW Show | | 1 | 11 | | |
| 152 | Buddy Rose (3) and Ed Wiskoski | December 7, 1977 | PNW Show | | 1 | 105 | | |
| 153 | Jesse Ventura (5) and Jerry Oates | March 22, 1978 | PNW Show | | 1 | 27 | | |
| 154 | Bull Ramos (5) and The Iron Sheik | April 18, 1978 | PNW Show | | 1 | 53 | | |
| 155 | Dutch Savage (10) and Jimmy Snuka (7) | June 10, 1978 | PNW Show | | 6 | 91 | | |
| 156 | Buddy Rose (4) and Ed Wiskoski (2) | September 9, 1978 | PNW Show | | 2 | 73 | | |
| 157 | Dutch Savage (11) and Jonathan Boyd (7) | November 21, 1978 | PNW Show | Portland, Oregon | 1 | 40 | | |
| 158 | Roddy Piper and Killer Brooks | December 31, 1978 | PNW Show | | 1 | 93 | | |
| 159 | Adrian Adonis and Ron Starr | April 3, 1979 | PNW Show | | 1 | 109 | | |
| 160 | Kiwi Sheepherders (Brute Miller and Luke Williams) | July 21, 1979 | PNW Show | | 1 | 63 | | |
| 161 | Dutch Savage (12) and Stan Stasiak (5) | September 22, 1979 | PNW Show | | 1 | 7 | | |
| 162 | Kiwi Sheepherders (Brute Miller and Luke Williams) | September 29, 1979 | PNW Show | | 2 | 174 | | |
| 163 | Roddy Piper (2) and Rick Martel | March 21, 1980 | PNW Show | | 1 | 52 | | |
| 164 | Kiwi Sheepherders (Brute Miller and Luke Williams) | May 12, 1980 | PNW Show | | 3 | 85 | | |
| 165 | Roddy Piper (3) and Rick Martel | August 5, 1980 | PNW Show | | 2 | N/A | Defeated Buddy Rose & Ed Wiskoski in a no disqualification, lumberjack match for the vacant titles after The Sheepherders left the territory. A match between the two teams on Aug 2 to decide new champions ended in a double countout in the third fall. | |
| 166 | Buddy Rose (5) and Ed Wiskoski (3) | 1980 | PNW Show | | 3 | N/A | | |
| 167 | Roddy Piper (4) and Rick Martel (3) | 1980 | PNW Show | | 3 | N/A | | |
| 168 | Roddy Piper (5) and Mike Popovich | August 28, 1980 | PNW Show | | 1 | 15 | Martel lost a loser-leaves-town match to Buddy Rose on August 16, 1980; Popovich replaced Martel | |
| 169 | Rip Oliver and Fidel Cortez | September 12, 1980 | PNW Show | Grandview, Washington | 1 | 43 | | |
| 170 | Jay Youngblood and Joe Lightfoot | October 25, 1980 | PNW Show | | 1 | 84 | | |
| 171 | Rip Oliver (2) and The Destroyer | January 17, 1981 | PNW Show | | 1 | 91 | | |
| 172 | Buzz and Brett Sawyer | April 18, 1981 | PNW Show | | 1 | 51 | | |
| 173 | Rip Oliver (3) and The Destroyer (2) | June 8, 1981 | PNW Show | | 2 | 33 | | |
| 174 | Matt Borne and Steve Regal | July 11, 1981 | PNW Show | | 1 | 49 | | |
| 175 | Rip Oliver (4) and Buddy Rose (6) | August 29, 1981 | PNW Show | | 1 | 7 | | |
| 176 | Matt Borne and Steve Regal | September 5, 1981 | PNW Show | | 2 | 60 | | |
| 177 | Stan Stasiak (6) and Buddy Rose (7) | November 4, 1981 | PNW Show | | 1 | 24 | | |
| 178 | Rocky Johnson and Iceman King Parsons | November 28, 1981 | PNW Show | Portland, Oregon | 1 | 49 | | |
| 179 | Rip Oliver (5) and Matt Borne (3) | January 16, 1982 | PNW Show | | 1 | 101 | | |
| 180 | Larry and Curt Hennig | April 27, 1982 | PNW Show | | 1 | 4 | | |
| 181 | Rip Oliver (6) and Matt Borne (4) | May 1, 1982 | PNW Show | | 2 | 32 | | |
| 182 | Brett Sawyer (2) and Rocky Johnson (2) | June 2, 1982 | PNW Show | Seattle, Washington | 1 | 58 | | |
| 183 | Rip Oliver (7) and Buddy Rose (8) | July 30, 1982 | PNW Show | | 2 | 14 | | |
| 184 | Brett Sawyer (3) and Steve Pardee | August 13, 1982 | PNW Show | | 1 | 29 | | |
| 185 | Rip Oliver (8) and The Assassin (3) | September 11, 1982 | PNW Show | Portland, Oregon | 1 | 92 | | |
| 186 | Stan Stasiak (7) and Billy Jack | December 12, 1982 | PNW Show | | 1 | 20 | | |
| 187 | Rip Oliver (9) and The Assassin (4) | January 1, 1983 | PNW Show | Portland, Oregon | 1 | 68 | | |
| 188 | Stan Stasiak (8) and Billy Jack | March 10, 1983 | PNW Show | Salem, Oregon | 2 | 23 | | |
| 189 | Rip Oliver (10) and The Assassin (5) | April 2, 1983 | PNW Show | Portland, Oregon | 3 | 140 | | |
| 190 | Buddy Rose (9) and Brian Adias | August 20, 1983 | PNW Show | Portland, Oregon | 1 | 10 | | |
| 191 | Rip Oliver (11) and The Assassin (6) | August 30, 1983 | PNW Show | Seattle, Washington | 4 | 67 | | |
| 192 | Buddy Rose (10) and Curt Hennig (2) | November 5, 1983 | PNW Show | Portland, Oregon | 1 | 7 | | |
| 193 | Dynamite Kid and The Assassin (7) | November 12, 1983 | PNW Show | Portland, Oregon | 1 | 41 | | |
| 194 | Curt Hennig (3) and Pat McGhee | December 23, 1983 | PNW Show | Eugene, Oregon | 1 | 50 | | |
| 195 | Rip Oliver (12) and The Assassin (8) | February 11, 1984 | PNW Show | Portland, Oregon | 5 | 102 | | |
| 196 | Tom Prichard and Brett Sawyer (4) | May 23, 1984 | PNW Show | Seattle, Washington | 1 | 59 | | |
| 197 | Mike Miller and Mr. Ebony | July 21, 1984 | PNW Show | | 1 | 28 | | |
| 198 | Tom Prichard and Brett Sawyer (5) | August 18, 1984 | PNW Show | Portland, Oregon | 2 | 35 | | |
| 199 | Tom Prichard (3) and Jerry Gray | September 22, 1984 | PNW Show | | 1 | 59 | Jerry Gray replaced Brett Sawyer when he was unable to compete due to an injury | |
| 200 | Mike Miller (2) and Mr. Ebony (2) | November 20, 1984 | PNW Show | | 2 | 53 | | |
| 201 | Billy Two Eagles and Don Running Bear | January 12, 1985 | PNW Show | Portland, Oregon | 1 | 91 | | |
| 202 | Mega Maharishi (4) and Kendo Nagasaki | April 13, 1985 | PNW Show | Portland, Oregon | 1 | 28 | | |
| 203 | Billy Jack Haynes (3) and Ricky Vaughn | May 11, 1985 | PNW Show | Portland, Oregon | 1 | N/A | | |
| — | Vacated | May 1985 | — | — | — | — | Haynes left the area | |
| 204 | Mike Miller (3) and Karl Steiner | June 8, 1985 | PNW Show | Portland, Oregon | 1 | 108 | Defeat Bobby Jaggers and Ricky Vaughn in tournament final | |
| 205 | S&S Express (Steve Simpson and Joe Savoldi) | September 24, 1985 | Owen Family Super Extravaganza | Portland, Oregon | 1 | 28 | | |
| 206 | Mike Miller (4) and Moondog Moretti | October 22, 1985 | PNW Show | Fort Lewis, Washington | 1 | 53 | | |
| 207 | Tom Zenk and Scott Doring | December 14, 1985 | PNW Show | Portland, Oregon | 1 | 43 | | |
| 208 | Bobby Jaggers and Rip Oliver (13) | January 26, 1986 | PNW Show | Salem, Oregon | 1 | N/A | | |
| 209 | Bobby Jaggers (2) and The Assassin (9) | 1986 | PNW Show | | 1 | N/A | | |
| 210 | Brady Boone and Cocoa Samoa | March 29, 1986 | PNW Show | Portland, Oregon | 1 | 88 | | |
| 211 | Mike Miller (5) and Abbuda Dein | June 25, 1986 | PNW Show | Madras, Oregon | 1 | 101 | | |
| 212 | Brady Boone (2) and Ricky Santana | October 4, 1986 | PNW Show | Portland, Oregon | 1 | 37 | | |
| 213 | Mike Miller (6) and Abbuda Dein | November 10, 1986 | PNW Show | Longview, Washington | 2 | 58 | | |
| 214 | Ricky Santana (2) and Cocoa Samoa (2) | January 7, 1987 | PNW Show | Portland, Oregon | 1 | 58 | | |
| 215 | Mike Miller (7) and Rip Oliver (14) | March 6, 1987 | PNW Show | Portland, Oregon | 1 | 78 | | |
| 216 | Mike Miller (8) and Black Ninja/Cocoa Samoa (3) | May 23, 1987 | PNW Show | Portland, Oregon | 1 | 63 | Defeat Rip Oliver and Moondog Moretti who was subbing for Mike Miller; Samoa wins title as masked Black Ninja and immediately unmasks | |
| 217 | Super Ninja and Rip Oliver (15) | July 25, 1987 | PNW Show | Portland, Oregon | 1 | 55 | | |
| 218 | Super Ninja and Joey Jackson | September 18, 1987 | PNW Show | | 1 | 50 | Jackson replaced Oliver who left the area | |
| 219 | The Southern Rockers (Scott Peterson and Steve Doll) | November 7, 1987 | PNW Show | Portland, Oregon | 1 | 140 | | |
| 220 | Mike Golden and Avalanche | March 26, 1988 | PNW Show | Portland, Oregon | 1 | 42 | | |
| 221 | The Southern Rockers (Scott Peterson and Steve Doll) | May 7, 1988 | PNW Show | Portland, Oregon | 2 | 56 | | |
| 222 | The Grappler and The Terminator | July 2, 1988 | PNW Show | Portland, Oregon | 1 | 7 | | |
| 223 | The Southern Rockers (Scott Peterson and Steve Doll) | July 9, 1988 | PNW Show | Portland, Oregon | 3 | 13 | Title help up after a match against Buddy Rose and Col. DeBeers on July 16, 1988 in Portland, Oregon | |
| 224 | The Southern Rockers (Scott Peterson and Steve Doll) | July 22, 1988 | PNW Show | Portland, Oregon | 4 | 43 | Defeat Rose and DeBeers in rematch | |
| 225 | Beach Boys (Buddy Rose (11) and Avalanche (2)) | September 3, 1988 | PNW Show | Portland, Oregon | 1 | 17 | | |
| 226 | The Southern Rockers (Scott Peterson and Steve Doll) | September 20, 1988 | PNW Show | Portland, Oregon | 5 | 39 | | |
| 227 | The Grappler (2)) and Abbuda Dein (3)) | October 29, 1988 | PNW Show | Portland, Oregon | 1 | 70 | | |
| 228 | The Southern Rockers (Scott Peterson and Steve Doll) | January 7, 1989 | PNW Show | Portland, Oregon | 6 | 21 | | |
| 229 | Buddy Rose (12) and Col. DeBeers (Ed Wiskoski) (7) | January 28, 1989 | PNW Show | Portland, Oregon | 3 | N/A | | |
| — | Vacated | March 1989 | — | — | — | — | Ruddy Rose was injured and unable to defend the championship | |
| 230 | The Southern Rockers (Scott Peterson and Steve Doll) | April 29, 1989 | PNW Show | Portland, Oregon | 7 | 70 | Defeated Col. DeBeers and Nord the Barbarian in tournament final | |
| 231 | Scotty the Body and Top Gun (10) | July 8, 1989 | PNW Show | Portland, Oregon | 1 | N/A | | |
| — | Vacated | July 22, 1989 | — | — | — | — | Title held up after Scotty and Top Gun split | |
| 233 | Scotty the Body and The Grappler (3) | August 5, 1989 | PNW Show | Portland, Oregon | 1 | 21 | Scotty defeats Top Gun for titles | |
| 234 | The Southern Rockers (Steve Doll (8) and Rex King) | August 26, 1989 | PNW Show | Portland, Oregon | 1 | N/A | | |
| — | Vacated | August 9, 1989 | — | — | — | — | Held-up after match with Scotty the Body and Grappler | |
| 235 | The Southern Rockers (Steve Doll (9) and Rex King) | September 16, 1989 | PNW Show | Portland, Oregon | 2 | 56 | Defeat Scotty and Grappler in rematch; help up after a match against Brian Adams in Jeff Warner on November 4, 1989 | |
| 236 | The Southern Rockers (Steve Doll (10) and Rex King) | November 11, 1989 | PNW Show | | 3 | 33 | Defeated Adams and Warner in rematch | |
| 237 | The Grappler (4)) and Brian Adams | December 14, 1989 | PNW Show | Salem, Oregon | 1 | 44 | | |
| 238 | The Southern Rockers (Steve Doll (11) and Rex King) | January 27, 1990 | PNW Show | Portland, Oregon | 4 | N/A | | |
| — | Vacated | February 1990 | — | — | — | — | Doll and King left PNW | |
| 240 | Juice Patrol (Beatlejuice and Big Juice) | March 31, 1990 | PNW Show | Portland, Oregon | 1 | 42 | | |
| 241 | U.S. Male (Ricky Santana (3) and Curtis Thompson) | May 12, 1990 | PNW Show | Portland, Oregon | 1 | 42 | | |
| 242 | Juice Patrol (Beatlejuice and Big Juice) | June 23, 1990 | PNW Show | Portland, Oregon | 2 | N/A | | |
| — | Vacated | June 30, 1990 | — | — | — | — | Big Juice lost a "Loser leaves town" match | |
| 243 | Latin Connection (Ricky Santana (4) and Al Madril (2)) | August 25, 1990 | PNW Show | Portland, Oregon | 1 | 4 | Defeat Steve Doll and Scott Norton; title help up after a match against Rip Oliver and Larry Oliver on September 22, 1990 in Portland, Oregon | |
| 244 | Rip Oliver (16) and Larry Oliver | August 29, 1990 | PNW Show | Portland, Oregon | 1 | 66 | Defeat Latin Connection in rematch | |
| 245 | Wrecking Crew (The Grappler (5)) and The Equalizer) | November 3, 1990 | PNW Show | Portland, Oregon | 1 | 30 | | |
| 246 | Steve Doll (12) and Scotty the Boddy (2)) | December 3, 1990 | PNW Show | Coos Bay, Oregon | 1 | 2 | | |
| 247 | Wrecking Crew (The Grappler (5)) and The Equalizer) | December 5, 1990 | PNW Show | Gresham, Oregon | 2 | 59 | | |
| 248 | Brad Anderson and The Hood (Ricky Santana (5)) | February 2, 1991 | PNW Show | Portland, Oregon | 1 | 14 | Title held-up after match with Steve Doll and Bart Sawyer in Portland, Oregon | |
| 249 | Brad Anderson and Ricky Santana (6) | February 16, 1991 | PNW Show | Portland, Oregon | 2 | N/A | | |
| — | Vacated | N/A | — | — | — | — | Defeat Steve Doll and Bart Sawyer for the held-up title (Santana is unmasked on February 16, 1990 in Portland, Oregon); titles vacated on unknown date for unknown reason | |
| 250 | Bruise Brothers (Ron Harris and Don Harris) | May 4, 1991 | PNW Show | Portland, Oregon | 1 | 39 | Defeated The Southern Rockers (Steve Doll and Rex King) in tournament final | |
| 251 | Steve Doll (13) and Jimmy Jack Funk | June 12, 1991 | PNW Show | Portland, Oregon | 1 | 8 | | |
| 252 | Bruise Brothers (Ron Harris and Don Harris) | June 20, 1991 | PNW Show | Portland, Oregon | 2 | 37 | | |
| 253 | Steve Doll (14) and Demolition Crush (2)) | July 27, 1991 | PNW Show | Portland, Oregon | 1 | 36 | | |
| 254 | The Grappler (7)) and Don Harris (3) | September 1, 1991 | PNW Show | Portland, Oregon | 1 | 41 | | |
| 255 | Bruise Brothers (Ron Harris and Don Harris) | October 12, 1991 | PNW Show | Portland, Oregon | 3 | 29 | Don Harris defeats The Grappler after they split up | |
| 256 | The Grappler (8)) and Steve Doll (15) | November 10, 1991 | PNW Show | Vancouver, Washington | 1 | 15 | | |
| 257 | Bruise Brothers (Ron Harris and Don Harris) | November 25, 1991 | PNW Show | Florence, Oregon | 4 | 13 | | |
| 258 | The Grappler (9)) and Steve Doll (16) | December 8, 1991 | PNW Show | Vancouver, Washington | 2 | N/A | | |
| 259 | Bruise Brothers (Ron Harris and Don Harris) | January 19, 1992 | PNW Show | | 5 | N/A | | |
| 260 | Jesse Barr (2) and Art Barr (3)) | January 29, 1992 | PNW Show | Vancouver, Washington | 1 | 10 | | |
| 261 | Bruise Brothers (Ron Harris and Don Harris) | January 29, 1992 | PNW Show | | 6 | N/A | | |
| — | Vacated | February 8, 1992 | — | — | — | — | Championship held-up after a match against Steve Doll and The Grappler | |
| 262 | The Grappler (10)) and Steve Doll (17) | February 15, 1992 | PNW Show | Portland, Oregon | 3 | 35 | Defeated Bruise Brothers in rematch | |
| 263 | Colonel DeBeers (6) and John Rambo | March 21, 1992 | PNW Show | Portland, Oregon | 1 | 14 | | |
| 264 | The Grappler (11)) and Steve Doll (18) | April 4, 1992 | PNW Show | Portland, Oregon | 4 | N/A | | |
| — | Deactivated | July 1992 | — | — | — | — | Promotion closed | |
