= Frankie Laine (wrestler) =

Canadian professional wrestler (1943–2016)

Personal information
- Born: Frank Luhovy; April 16, 1943
- Died: May 24, 2016 (aged 73) Alvinston, Ontario, Canada

Professional wrestling career
- Ring name(s): Frankie Lane; Red Shadow
- Billed height: 6 ft 0 in (183 cm)
- Billed weight: 225 lb (102 kg)

Frank Luhovy (April 16, 1943 – May 24, 2016), known as Cowboy Frankie Laine, was a Canadian professional wrestler.

== Professional wrestling career ==
Laine wrestled throughout Canada, Japan, Puerto Rico, and various parts of the United States. His career started in 1966 as a baby face along with his valet Peggy Laine in Ontario and later in Alberta. Into the early-1970s he wrestled in California and headlined cards in Los Angeles against Goliath and Black Gordman. In the mid-to-late-1970s he was again in Alberta at Stampede Wrestling. Into 1980 he was in the Detroit and Toronto areas. As well he teamed with Dutch Mantel as heels in a bloody feud against Carlos Colon and Victor Jovica as Los Vaqueros Locos and helped sell out the Hiram Bithorn Stadium in Hato Rey, Puerto Rico for 13 weeks straight. In 1985 he worked as a prelim wrestler for the WWF losing to their main stars mostly on TV shows. Luhovy also worked as a promoter for WWE in London, Ontario.

=== Post-Retirement ===
After retiring from wrestling, Laine ran his family's 700-acre farm in Alvinston, Ontario. When Owen Hart was accidentally killed in a wrestling stunt, Laine claimed that promoters' greed had led to Hart's death.

=== Death ===
Laine died in Petrolia, Ontario, on May 24, 2016, of multiple sclerosis.

== Championships and accomplishments ==
- Continental Wrestling Association
  - NWA Mid-America Heavyweight Championship (1 time)
- Mid-Pacific Promotions
  - NWA Hawaii Heavyweight Championship (1 time)
- NWA Hollywood Wrestling
  - NWA Americas Heavyweight Championship (1 time)
- Pacific Northwest Wrestling
  - NWA Pacific Northwest Tag Team Championship (3 times) - with Moondog Mayne (1), Bobby Nichols (1) and Big Snuka (1).
- Stampede Wrestling
  - Stampede North American Heavyweight Championship (2 times)
  - Stampede Wrestling International Tag Team Championship (1 time) - with Les Thorton (1)
- World Wrestling Council
  - NWA North American Tag Team Championship (Puerto Rico/WWC version) (3 times) - with Dutch Mantel (3)
