= Tony Borne =

American professional wrestler (1926–2010)

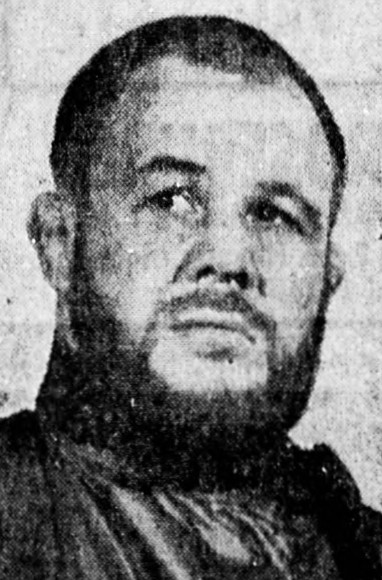
- Borne, circa 1960

Personal information
- Born: Anthony Wayne Osborne; July 13, 1926 Columbus, Ohio, U.S.
- Died: August 27, 2010 (aged 84) Oak Grove, Oregon, U.S.
- Children: Matt Osborne

Professional wrestling career
- Ring name: Tony Borne
- Billed height: 5 ft 9 in (1.75 m)
- Billed weight: 220 lb (100 kg; 16 st)
- Trained by: Ali Pasha; Karl Pojello
- Debut: September 23, 1952
- Retired: 1981

Anthony Wayne Osborne (July 13, 1926 – August 27, 2010) was an American professional wrestler, better known by his ring name, "Tough" Tony Borne.

== Professional wrestling career ==
Osborne was an amateur wrestler in both high school and in the United States Navy. Promoter Al Haft first convinced him to try professional wrestling. His initial trainers were Ali Pasha and Karl Pojello. Pojello convinced Osborne to shorten his ring name to Borne.

In the 1950s, he wrestled mostly in Texas and Pacific Northwest territories, becoming a mainstay in the NWA Pacific Northwest under promoter Don Owen. in 1953, he had a stint in Mexico, where he wrestled the Blue Demon.

Throughout his career he wrestled for the NWA World Heavyweight Championship against Pat O'Connor, Gene Kiniski and Lou Thesz. In the early 1960s in the Omaha territory for promoter Joe Dusek, Osborne had matches with AWA World Heavyweight Champion Verne Gagne. He influenced up-and-coming wrestlers who spent time in the Pacific Northwest such as Roddy Piper, Rick Martel, Buddy Rose, Rip Oliver, Lonnie Mayne and Billy Jack Haynes.

After his son Matt became a professional wrestler, the duo worked occasionally as a tag team.

Tough Tony Borne Promotional Photo - Autographed

== Personal life ==
Osborne married Nona Faye Muller in 1955, and was the father of late professional wrestler Matt Osborne. After retiring from professional wrestling, Osborne prospered in real estate. A pacemaker was inserted in his heart in August 2010, but he died at his home on August 27 of that year.

== Championships and accomplishments ==
- Cauliflower Alley Club
  - Other honoree (1997)
- NWA All-Star Wrestling
  - NWA Canadian Tag Team Championship (Vancouver version) (2 times) – with John Tolos
  - NWA World Tag Team Championship (Vancouver version) (1 time) – with John Tolos
- Pacific Northwest Wrestling
  - NWA Pacific Northwest Heavyweight Championship (9 times)
  - NWA Pacific Northwest Tag Team Championship (20 times) – with Ed Francis (1), Shag Thomas (2), Pat Patterson (1), Jay York (1), Professor Hiro (1), Mr. Fuji (1), Moondog Mayne (11), Tony Marino (1) and The Skull (1)
- Ring Around The Northwest Newsletter
  - Wrestler of the Year (1966)
  - Tag Team of the Year (1967–1969) with Lonnie Mayne
- Southwest Sports/World Class Championship Wrestling
  - NWA Brass Knuckles Championship (Texas version) (4 times)
  - NWA Texas Tag Team Championship (2 times) – with Danny McShain (1) and Don Manoukian (1)
  - NWA World Tag Team Championship (1 time) - with Ivan the Terrible
- Superstar Championship Wrestling
  - SCW Western States Tag Team Championship (1 time) - with Moondog Mayne
