= Shag Thomas =

American professional wrestler (1924–1982)

Personal information
- Born: James Thomas; August 11, 1924 Stewartsville, Ohio, US
- Died: July 25, 1982 (aged 57) Portland, Oregon, US

Professional wrestling career
- Ring name(s): Shag Thomas; King Toby
- Billed height: 5 ft 6 in (1.68 m)
- Billed weight: 255 lb (116 kg)
- Billed from: Portland, Oregon
- Debut: 1954
- Retired: 1976

James "Shag" Thomas (August 11, 1924 – July 25, 1982) was an American professional wrestler during the 1950s and 1960s. He was one of the few prominent African-American wrestlers of his day.

== Early life, family and education ==
Thomas attended Bellaire High School in Bellaire, Ohio. He played football for the school's Big Reds under head coach John "Butch" Niemiec, a former star player at the University of Notre Dame under coach Knute Rockne. In Thomas' four years in high school, the Big Reds record was 31–6–1 and included an Ohio Valley Athletic Association title. He graduated in 1942.

He subsequently served in the US military during World War II.

Thomas attended Ohio State University, playing for the Ohio State Buckeye squad. He was a member of the 1950 Rose Bowl champion team that entered that game at 6–1–2 and was deemed the sixth best team that year in the AP poll. During that season he had great performances against an undefeated Minnesota and Michigan.

Thomas' younger brother Clyde Thomas starred in the backfield for the Ohio University football team that went undefeated in 1960. Clyde played football for the National Football League's Philadelphia Eagles, Canadian Football League's British Columbia Lions, and United Football League's Wheeling Ironmen.

== Career ==
In July 1950, Thomas signed a contract with the Green Bay Packers and appeared in pre-season games that year. However, he was cut prior to the final exhibition game.

Thomas was also known as King Toby and often fought as a babyface. During most of his career, segregation in wrestling was the norm in many (if not most) territories and promotions throughout the US. Although he had wrestled in his native Ohio for promoter Al Haft, he gained prominence while wrestling in the Pacific Northwest Wrestling territory for promoter Don Owen. Owen did not segregate his wrestlers, and Thomas flourished there, winning the Pacific Northwest Heavyweight Championship twice and the Tag Team Championship 16 times.

Thomas retired from wrestling in 1969 after defeating Roger Kirby by disqualification in his final match. After retirement, he refereed wrestling matches on Owen's Portland Wrestling broadcast Saturday nights on KPTV. In 1972, Thomas came out of retirement and returned to wrestling until 1976.

== Personal life ==
Thomas succumbed to a heart attack on July 25, 1982, at age 57.

== Championships and accomplishments ==
- Bellaire High School
  - Wall of Fame Induction Class of 1993
- NWA Los Angeles
  - NWA "Beat the Champ" Television Championship (1 time)
- Pacific Northwest Wrestling
  - NWA Pacific Northwest Heavyweight Championship (2 times)
  - NWA Pacific Northwest Tag Team Championship (16 times) - with Luther Lindsey (4), Pepper Martin (3), Tony Borne (2), Bearcat Wright (2), Billy White Wolf (1), Danny Hodge (1), Don Manoukian (1), Armand Hussein (1), and Rene Goulet (1)
- Stampede Wrestling
  - NWA Canadian Tag Team Championship (Calgary version) (1 time) - with Mighty Ursus
  - NWA International Tag Team Championship (Calgary version) (1 time) - with Mighty Ursus
