= NWA Pacific Northwest Heavyweight Championship =

Professional wrestling championship

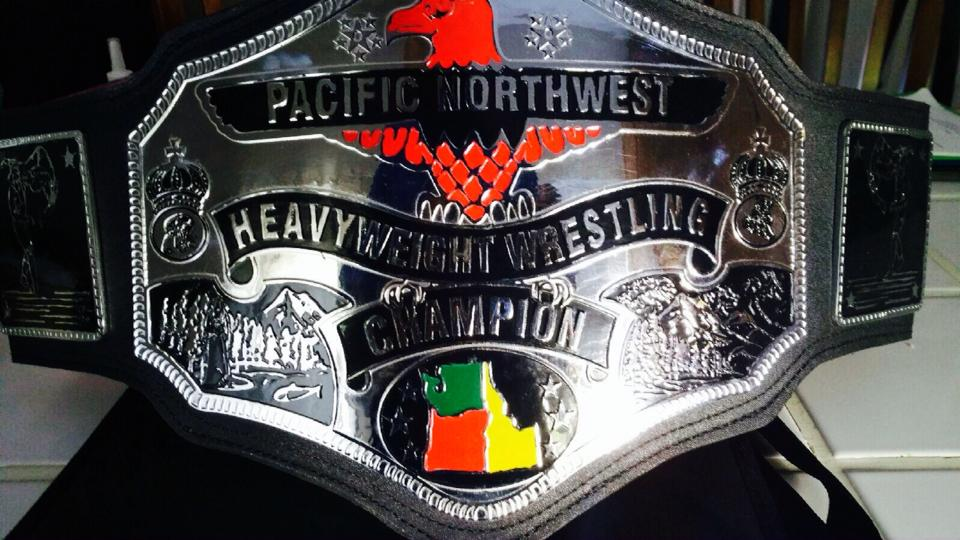
- The last NWA Pacific Northwest Heavyweight Championship belt, introduced by Blue Collar Wrestling on January 10, 2015.

Details
- Promotion: Pacific Northwest Wrestling; Wrestling International New Generations; Blue Collar Wrestling
- Date established: 1955
- Date retired: 2017

Other names
- W*ING Pacific Northwest Heavyweight Championship (name used in Japan)
Statistics
- First champion: Luther Lindsay
- Final champion: Gregor Petrov
- Most reigns: Rip Oliver (12 times)
- Longest reign: "Badd Blood" BJ Darden (425 days)
- Shortest reign: Matt Borne (1 day)

The NWA Pacific Northwest Heavyweight Championship was a professional wrestling championship sanctioned by the National Wrestling Alliance (NWA) and defended in its member promotion Pacific Northwest Wrestling (PNW), which promoted shows in the U.S. states of Oregon and Washington, and occasionally other areas in the northwestern United States.

The title was created in 1955 by Don Owen for the NWA's Pacific Northwest territory, and became the top singles title for that area. The first champion was Luther Lindsay. Early in the championship's history, the title would be won by Ed Francis, who was already the territory's top non-heavyweight singles champion, holding the Pacific Coast Junior Heavyweight Championship. Upon Francis winning the NWA Pacific Northwest Heavyweight Championship, his Pacific Coast Junior Heavyweight Championship was retired. In addition to the northwestern United States, the title was also briefly defended in Asia in the Japanese promotion Wrestling International New Generations (W*ING), but the title changes in W*ING were not officially recognized by PNW.

The title remained active until July 1992, when Don Owen retired and sold PNW to Sandy Barr. Barr retired all of Owen's NWA championships after renaming the company to Championship Wrestling USA (CWUSA), creating new CWUSA championships in their places. The physical Owen-era NWA Pacific Northwest Heavyweight Championship belt was owned by "The Grappler" Len Denton, who later auctioned off the belt to Bruce Owens. Wrestling belt maker Dave Millican purchased it from Owens and later sold it to an unknown collector.

Elite Canadian Championship Wrestling (ECCW), also known as NWA: Extreme Canadian Championship Wrestling, became NWA's Pacific Northwest territory in 1998. The promotion's top championship, the ECCW Championship, was briefly referred to as the NWA/ECCW Pacific Northwest Heavyweight Championship. ECCW left the NWA in 2011, leaving the NWA without a Pacific Northwest-based member promotion. In January 2015, the Portland-based Blue Collar Wrestling (BCW) promotion joined the NWA, reintroducing the NWA Pacific Northwest Heavyweight Championship – tracing the lineage back to the original version of the title. The championship was retired after Billy Corgan purchased the NWA and ended its relationships with existing member promotions.

== Title history ==
Key
No.	Overall reign number
Reign	Reign number for the specific champion
Days	Number of days held

No.	Champion	Championship change			Reign statistics		Notes	Ref.
No.	Champion	Date	Event	Location	Reign	Days	Notes	Ref.
Pacific Northwest Wrestling (PNW)
1	Luther Lindsay	May 24, 1955	PNW Show	Salem, Oregon	1	28	Defeated Roger Mackay in a tournament final to become the inaugural champion.	
2	Ivan Kameroff	June 21, 1955	PNW Show	Salem, Oregon	1	105		
3	John Paul Henning	October 4, 1955	PNW Show	Salem, Oregon	1	137		
4	Bull Montana	February 18, 1956	PNW Show	Eugene, Oregon	1	103		
5	Herb Freeman	May 31, 1956	PNW Show	Albany, Oregon	1	76		
6	Bud Curtis	August 15, 1956	PNW Show	Salem, Oregon	1	55		
7	Ed Francis	October 9, 1956	PNW Show	Salem, Oregon	1	240		
8	Bill Savage	June 6, 1957	PNW Show	Portland, Oregon	1	36		
9	Herb Freeman	July 12, 1957	PNW Show	Portland, Oregon	2	28		
10	Doug Donovan	August 9, 1957	PNW Show	Portland, Oregon	1	66		
11	Kurt Von Himmler	October 14, 1957	PNW Show	Portland, Oregon	1	88		
12	Nick Kozak	January 10, 1958	PNW Show	Portland, Oregon	1	70		
13	Bill Savage	March 21, 1958	PNW Show	Portland, Oregon	2	161		
14	Ed Francis	August 29, 1958	PNW Show	Portland, Oregon	2	77		
15	Eric Pederson	November 14, 1958	PNW Show	Portland, Oregon	1	3		
16	Ed Francis	November 21, 1958	PNW Show	Portland, Oregon	3	112		
17	Bill Savage	March 13, 1959	PNW Show	Portland, Oregon	3	70		
18	Kurt Von Poppenheim	May 22, 1959	PNW Show	Portland, Oregon	1	42		
19	Bill Savage	July 3, 1959	PNW Show	Portland, Oregon	4	70		
20	Ed Francis	September 11, 1959	PNW Show	Portland, Oregon	4	160		
21	Shag Thomas	February 18, 1960	PNW Show	N/A	1	29		
22	Ed Francis	March 18, 1960	PNW Show	Portland, Oregon	5	173		
23	Tony Borne	September 7, 1960	PNW Show	N/A	1	93		
24	Herb Freeman	December 9, 1960	PNW Show	Portland, Oregon	3	112		
25	Iron Mike DiBiase	March 31, 1961	PNW Show	Portland, Oregon	1	56		
26	Luther Lindsay	May 26, 1961	PNW Show	Portland, Oregon	2	122		
27	Nicoli Volkoff	September 25, 1961	PNW Show	Portland, Oregon	1	67		
28	Billy White Wolf	December 1, 1961	PNW Show	Portland, Oregon	1	36		
29	Fritz Von Goering	January 20, 1962	PNW Show	Eugene, Oregon	1	230		
30	Luther Lindsay	August 24, 1962	PNW Show	Portland, Oregon	2	41		
31	Mad Dog Vachon	October 4, 1962	PNW Show	Portland, Oregon	1	114		
32	Herb Freeman	January 26, 1963	PNW Show	Portland, Oregon	4	21		
33	Mad Dog Vachon	February 16, 1963	PNW Show	Portland, Oregon	2	83		
34	Herb Freeman	May 10, 1963	PNW Show	Portland, Oregon	5	7		
35	Mad Dog Vachon	May 17, 1963	PNW Show	Portland, Oregon	3	49		
36	Billy White Wolf	July 5, 1963	PNW Show	Portland, Oregon	2	50		
37	Tony Borne	August 24, 1963	PNW Show	Portland, Oregon	2	12		
38	King Curtis Iaukea	September 5, 1963	PNW Show	Portland, Oregon	1	14		
39	Tony Borne	September 19, 1963	PNW Show	Portland, Oregon	3	41		
40	Nick Bockwinkel	October 30, 1963	PNW Show	Salem, Oregon	1	22		
41	Mad Dog Vachon	November 21, 1963	PNW Show	Portland, Oregon	4	43		
42	The Destroyer	January 3, 1964	PNW Show	Portland, Oregon	1	98		
43	Tony Borne	April 10, 1964	PNW Show	Portland, Oregon	4	11		
44	The Destroyer	April 21, 1964	PNW Show	Portland, Oregon	2	31		
45	Nick Bockwinkel	May 22, 1964	PNW Show	Portland, Oregon	2	32		
46	Pampero Firpo	June 23, 1964	PNW Show	Eugene, Oregon	1	46		
47	Don Manoukian	August 8, 1964	PNW Show	Seattle, Washington	1	25		
48	Pepper Martin	September 2, 1964	PNW Show	Eugene, Oregon	1	30		
49	Pat Patterson	October 2, 1964	PNW Show	Portland, Oregon	1	43		
50	Pepper Martin	November 14, 1964	PNW Show	Portland, Oregon	2	50		
51	Pat Patterson	January 3, 1965	PNW Show	Eugene, Oregon	2	5		
52	Pepper Martin	January 8, 1965	PNW Show	Portland, Oregon	3	62		
53	The Mad Russian	March 11, 1965	PNW Show	Portland, Oregon	1	81		
54	Pepper Martin	May 31, 1965	PNW Show	Eugene, Oregon	4	5		
55	Mad Dog Vachon	June 5, 1965	PNW Show	Portland, Oregon	5	13		
56	Stan Stasiak	June 18, 1965	PNW Show	Portland, Oregon	1	258		
57	Paul Jones	March 3, 1966	PNW Show	Salem, Oregon	1	76		
58	Stan Stasiak	May 18, 1966	PNW Show	Salem, Oregon	2	28		
59	Pepper Martin	June 15, 1966	PNW Show	Eugene, Oregon	5	93		
60	Tony Borne	September 16, 1966	PNW Show	Portland, Oregon	5	48		
61	Shag Thomas	November 3, 1966	PNW Show	Salem, Oregon	2	7		
62	Tony Borne	November 10, 1966	PNW Show	Salem, Oregon	6	29		
63	Pat Patterson	December 9, 1966	PNW Show	Portland, Oregon	3	9		
64	Tony Borne	December 18, 1966	PNW Show	Portland, Oregon	7	11		
65	Paul Jones	December 29, 1966	PNW Show	Salem, Oregon	2	7		
66	Tony Borne	January 5, 1967	PNW Show	Salem, Oregon	8	127		
67	Ripper Collins	May 12, 1967	PNW Show	Portland, Oregon	1	17		
68	Tony Borne	May 29, 1967	PNW Show	Portland, Oregon	9	4		
69	Luther Lindsay	June 2, 1967	PNW Show	Portland, Oregon	3	21		
70	Moondog Mayne	June 23, 1967	PNW Show	Portland, Oregon	1	34		
71	Johnny Kostas	July 27, 1967	PNW Show	Salem, Oregon	1	99		
72	Moondog Mayne	November 3, 1967	PNW Show	Portland, Oregon	2	63		
73	Stan Stasiak	January 5, 1968	PNW Show	Portland, Oregon	3	70		
74	Moondog Mayne	March 15, 1968	PNW Show	Portland, Oregon	3	76		
75	Mad Dog Vachon	May 30, 1968	PNW Show	Salem, Oregon	6	7		
76	Moondog Mayne	June 6, 1968	PNW Show	Salem, Oregon	4	71		
77	Stan Stasiak	August 16, 1968	PNW Show	Portland, Oregon	4	14		
78	Moondog Mayne	August 30, 1968	PNW Show	Portland, Oregon	5	92		
79	Luther Lindsay	November 30, 1968	PNW Show	Portland, Oregon	4	133	Lindsay defeated Beauregard, substituting for Mayne, to win the title.	
80	Moondog Mayne	April 12, 1969	PNW Show	Portland, Oregon	6	122		
81	Roger Kirby	August 12, 1969	PNW Show	Portland, Oregon	1	29		
82	Moondog Mayne	September 10, 1969	PNW Show	Portland, Oregon	7	34		
83	Roger Kirby	October 14, 1969	PNW Show	Portland, Oregon	2	57		
84	Moondog Mayne	December 10, 1969	PNW Show	Portland, Oregon	8	79		
85	Kurt Von Steiger	February 27, 1970	PNW Show	Salem, Oregon	1	12		
86	Moondog Mayne	March 11, 1970	PNW Show	Salem, Oregon	9	66		
87	The Claw	May 16, 1970	PNW Show	Portland, Oregon	1	38		
88	Moondog Mayne	June 23, 1970	PNW Show	Portland, Oregon	10	46		
89	Mr. Fuji	August 8, 1970	PNW Show	Portland, Oregon	1	77		
90	Moondog Mayne	October 24, 1970	PNW Show	Portland, Oregon	11	49		
91	Dutch Savage	December 12, 1970	PNW Show	Portland, Oregon	1	105		
92	Stan Stasiak	March 27, 1971	PNW Show	Portland, Oregon	5	35		
93	Kurt Von Steiger	May 1, 1971	PNW Show	Portland, Oregon	2	91		
94	Jonathan Boyd	July 31, 1971	PNW Show	N/A	1	85		
95	Dutch Savage	October 24, 1971	PNW Show	N/A	2	35		
96	Jonathan Boyd	November 28, 1971	PNW Show	N/A	2	30		
97	Dutch Savage	December 28, 1971	PNW Show	Portland, Oregon	3	123		
98	Bull Ramos	April 29, 1972	PNW Show	Portland, Oregon	1	196		
99	Steven Little Bear	November 11, 1972	PNW Show	N/A	1	19		
100	Bull Ramos	November 30, 1972	PNW Show	Portland, Oregon	2	69		
101	Dutch Savage	February 7, 1973	PNW Show	Medford, Oregon	4	62		
102	Bull Ramos	April 10, 1973	PNW Show	Portland, Oregon	3	220		
103	Jimmy Snuka	November 16, 1973	PNW Show	Eugene, Oregon	1	57		
104	Ripper Collins	January 12, 1974	PNW Show	Portland, Oregon	2	42		
105	Jimmy Snuka	February 23, 1974	PNW Show	Portland, Oregon	2	35		
—	Vacated	March 30, 1974	PNW Show	Portland, Oregon	—	—	Vacated after a match against Ripper Collins.	
106	Ripper Collins	April 13, 1974	PNW Show	Portland, Oregon	3	52	Collins won the championship during a rematch with Jimmy Snuka.	
107	Jimmy Snuka	June 4, 1974	PNW Show	Portland, Oregon	3	67		
108	Rasputin	August 10, 1974	PNW Show	Portland, Oregon	1	58		
109	Jimmy Snuka	October 7, 1974	PNW Show	N/A	4	35		
110	Dale Lewis	November 11, 1974	PNW Show	N/A	1	33		
111	Dutch Savage	December 14, 1974	PNW Show	Portland, Oregon	5	167		
112	Bull Ramos	May 30, 1975	PNW Show	Eugene, Oregon	4	71		
113	Jimmy Snuka	August 9, 1975	PNW Show	Portland, Oregon	5	161		
114	Jesse Ventura	January 17, 1976	PNW Show	Portland, Oregon	1	77		
115	Dutch Savage	April 3, 1976	PNW Show	Portland, Oregon	6	104		
116	Jesse Ventura	July 16, 1976	PNW Show	Eugene, Oregon	2	197		
117	Jimmy Snuka	January 29, 1977	PNW Show	Portland, Oregon	6	84		
118	Ron Bass	April 23, 1977	PNW Show	Portland, Oregon	1	100		
119	Dutch Savage	August 1, 1977	PNW Show	Eugene, Oregon	7	103		
120	Ed Wiskoski	November 12, 1977	PNW Show	Portland, Oregon	1	182		
121	Jerry Oates	May 13, 1978	PNW Show	Portland, Oregon	1	34		
122	Ed Wiskoski	June 16, 1978	PNW Show	Salem, Oregon	2	67		
123	Jonathan Boyd	August 22, 1978	PNW Show	Portland, Oregon	3	169		
124	Roddy Piper	February 7, 1979	PNW Show	Portland, Oregon	1	143		
125	Stan Stasiak	June 30, 1979	PNW Show	Portland, Oregon	6	124		
126	Buddy Rose	November 1, 1979	PNW Show	Salem, Oregon	1	1		
127	Stan Stasiak	November 2, 1979	PNW Show	Eugene, Oregon	8	14		
128	Buddy Rose	November 16, 1979	PNW Show	Portland, Oregon	2	83		
129	Rick Martel	February 7, 1980	PNW Show	Salem, Oregon	1	2		
130	Buddy Rose	February 9, 1980	PNW Show	Portland, Oregon	3	42		
131	Rick Martel	March 22, 1980	PNW Show	Eugene, Oregon	2	147		
132	Buddy Rose	August 16, 1980	PNW Show	Portland, Oregon	4	19		
133	Roddy Piper	September 4, 1980	PNW Show	N/A	2	16		
134	Buddy Rose	September 20, 1980	PNW Show	N/A	5	98		
135	Jay Youngblood	December 27, 1980	PNW Show	Portland, Oregon	1	9		
136	Buddy Rose	January 5, 1981	PNW Show	Longview, Washington	6	2		
137	Jay Youngblood	January 7, 1981	PNW Show	Seattle, Washington	2	66		
138	The Destroyer	March 14, 1981	PNW Show	Portland, Oregon	1	7		
139	Jay Youngblood	March 21, 1981	PNW Show	Portland, Oregon	2	19		
140	Buddy Rose	April 9, 1981	PNW Show	Salem, Oregon	7	2		
141	Jay Youngblood	April 11, 1981	PNW Show	Portland, Oregon	3	13		
142	Buddy Rose	April 24, 1981	PNW Show	Eugene, Oregon	8	5		
143	Matt Borne	April 29, 1981	PNW Show	Seattle, Washington	1	1		
144	Buddy Rose	April 30, 1981	PNW Show	Salem, Oregon	9	1		
145	Jay Youngblood	May 1, 1981	PNW Show	Eugene, Oregon	4	15		
—	Vacated	May 16, 1981	PNW Show	N/A	—	—	Championship vacated when Youngblood left the promotion.	
146	Steve Regal	June 30, 1981	PNW Show	Seattle, Washington	1	46	Regal won a tournament final to win the vacant title.	
147	Buddy Rose	August 15, 1981	PNW Show	N/A	7	52		
—	Vacated	October 6, 1981	PNW Show	Portland, Oregon	—	—	Vacated after a match against Steve Regal.	
148	Steve Regal	October 24, 1981	PNW Show	Portland, Oregon	2	42		
—	Vacated	December 5, 1981	PNW Show	N/A	—	—	Title vacated when Regal was injured.	
149	Brett Sawyer	January 2, 1982	PNW Show	Portland, Oregon	1	42	Sawyer won a battle royal to become champion.	
—	Vacated	February 13, 1982	PNW Show	Portland, Oregon	—	—	The championship was vacated after a match against Buddy Rose.	
150	Brett Sawyer	February 16, 1982	PNW Show	N/A	2	67	Sawyer won the vacant championship during a rematch with Buddy Rose.	
151	Rip Oliver	April 24, 1982	PNW Show	Portland, Oregon	1	82		
152	Rocky Johnson	July 15, 1982	PNW Show	N/A	1	16		
153	Rip Oliver	July 31, 1982	PNW Show	N/A	2	25		
154	Brett Sawyer	August 25, 1982	PNW Show	Coos Bay, Oregon	3	3		
155	Rip Oliver	August 28, 1982	PNW Show	Portland, Oregon	3	25		
156	Brett Sawyer	September 22, 1982	PNW Show	Salem, Oregon	3	76		
157	Sheik Abdullah Ali Hassan	December 7, 1982	PNW Show	Portland, Oregon	1	154		
158	Curt Hennig	May 10, 1983	PNW Show	Portland, Oregon	1	120		
159	The Dynamite Kid	September 7, 1983	PNW Show	Seattle, Washington	1	30		
160	Billy Jack	October 7, 1983	PNW Show	Salem, Oregon	1	54		
161	Rip Oliver	November 30, 1983	PNW Show	Seattle, Washington	4	14		
162	Billy Jack	December 14, 1983	PNW Show	Seattle, Washington	2	11		
163	Rip Oliver	December 25, 1983	PNW Show	Seattle, Washington	5	125		
164	Buddy Rose	April 28, 1984	PNW Show	Portland, Oregon	11	14		
165	Rip Oliver	May 12, 1984	PNW Show	Portland, Oregon	6	154		
166	Billy Jack	October 13, 1984	PNW Show	Portland, Oregon	3	21		
167	Rip Oliver	November 3, 1984	PNW Show	Portland, Oregon	7	32		
168	Bobby Jaggers	December 5, 1984	PNW Show	Seattle, Washington	1	80		
169	Karl Steiner	February 23, 1985	PNW Show	Portland, Oregon	1	50		
170	Bobby Jaggers	April 14, 1985	PNW Show	Centralia, Washington	2	20		
171	Mike Miller	May 4, 1985	PNW Show	Portland, Oregon	1	84		
172	Ricky Vaughn	July 27, 1985	PNW Show	Portland, Oregon	1	105	Vaughn defeated Mike Miller during a tournament final.	
173	Bobby Jaggers	November 9, 1985	PNW Show	Portland, Oregon	3	73		
174	Tom Zenk	January 21, 1986	PNW Show	Portland, Oregon	1	47		
175	Bobby Jaggers	March 9, 1986	PNW Show	Findley, Washington	4	34		
176	Billy Jack	April 12, 1986	PNW Show	Portland, Oregon	4	19		
—	Vacated	May 1, 1986	PNW Show	N/A	—	—	Billy Jack was stripped of the title.	
177	Rip Oliver	June 13, 1986	PNW Show	Portland, Oregon	8	63	Oliver won a battle royal to win the vacant title.	
178	Cocoa Samoa	August 15, 1986	PNW Show	Albany, Oregon	1	36		
179	Rip Oliver	September 20, 1986	PNW Show	Seattle, Washington	9	70		
180	The Assassin	November 29, 1986	PNW Show	Portland, Oregon	2	14		
181	Rip Oliver	December 13, 1986	PNW Show	Portland, Oregon	10	98		
182	Ricky Santana	March 21, 1987	PNW Show	Portland, Oregon	1	28		
183	Rip Oliver	April 18, 1987	PNW Show	Portland, Oregon	11	70		
184	Mike Miller	June 27, 1987	PNW Show	Portland, Oregon	2	49		
—	Vacated	August 15, 1987	PNW Show	Portland, Oregon	—	—	Title was held up following a match against Rip Oliver.	
185	Mike Miller	August 22, 1987	PNW Show	Portland, Oregon	3	70	Miller defeated Rip Oliver by forfeit in a rematch to win the vacant title.	
186	The Grappler	October 31, 1987	PNW Show	Portland, Oregon	1	279		
187	Scott Peterson	August 5, 1988	PNW Show	Eugene, Oregon	1	34		
188	The Grappler	September 8, 1988	PNW Show	Newport, Oregon	2	25		
189	Top Gun	October 3, 1988	PNW Show	Longview, Washington	3	7		
190	The Grappler	October 10, 1988	PNW Show	N/A	3	5		
191	Tatsumi Fujinami	October 15, 1988	PNW Show	Portland, Oregon	1	56	Fujinami was awarded the title after The Grappler failed to defeat him in 30 minutes.	
192	The Grappler	December 10, 1988	PNW Show	Portland, Oregon	4	15		
193	Top Gun	December 25, 1988	PNW Show	Portland, Oregon	4	34		
194	The Grappler	January 28, 1989	PNW Show	Portland, Oregon	5	63		
195	Carl Styles	April 1, 1989	PNW Show	Portland, Oregon	1	14		
196	The Grappler	April 15, 1989	PNW Show	Portland, Oregon	6	7		
197	Carl Styles	April 22, 1989	PNW Show	Portland, Oregon	2	40		
—	Vacated	June 1, 1989	PNW Show	N/A	—	—	Title was vacated after Styles suffered an injury.	
198	Scotty The Body	September 2, 1989	PNW Show	Portland, Oregon	1	35	Scotty The Body defeated Carl Styles in a tournament final to win the vacant title.	
199	Rex King	October 7, 1989	PNW Show	Portland, Oregon	1	7		
200	Scotty The Body	October 14, 1989	PNW Show	Portland, Oregon	2	112		
201	Curtis Thompson	February 3, 1990	PNW Show	Portland, Oregon	1	55		
—	Vacated	March 30, 1990	PNW Show	Eugene, Oregon	—	—	Scotty The Body initially defeated Curtis Thompson to win the championship; the decision was later reversed and the title vacated after Scotty The Body was caught cheating to win the match against Thompson.	
202	Brian Adams	April 21, 1990	PNW Show	Portland, Oregon	1	21	Defeated Larry Oliver in a tournament final to win the vacant title.	
203	Scott Norton	May 12, 1990	PNW Show	Portland, Oregon	1	14		
—	Vacated	May 26, 1990	PNW Show	N/A	—	—	Title vacated after Norton was suspended for attacking several wrestlers.	
204	Scotty The Body	June 2, 1990	PNW Show	Portland, Oregon	3	56	Scotty The Body defeated The Grappler to win the vacant title.	
—	Vacated	July 28, 1990	PNW Show	Portland, Oregon	—	—	Title held up following a match against The Grappler.	
205	The Grappler	August 4, 1990	PNW Show	Portland, Oregon	7	98	The Grappler defeated Scotty The Body in a rematch to win the vacant title.	
206	Steve Doll	November 10, 1990	PNW Show	Portland, Oregon	1	239		
—	Vacated	July 7, 1991	PNW Show	Eugene, Oregon	—	—	Title held up following a match against Ron Harris.	
207	Billy Jack Haynes	August 17, 1991	PNW Show	Portland, Oregon	5	28	Won a full nelson challenge to win the vacant title.	
208	Steve Doll	September 14, 1991	PNW Show	Portland, Oregon	2	14		
209	Rip Oliver	September 28, 1991	PNW Show	Portland, Oregon	12	14		
210	Demolition Crush	October 12, 1991	PNW Show	Portland, Oregon	2	98		
211	Ron Harris	January 18, 1992	PNW Show	Portland, Oregon	1	20		
212	Steve Doll	February 7, 1992	PNW Show	Eugene, Oregon	3	46		
213	Ron Harris	March 24, 1992	PNW Show	Vancouver, Washington	2	28		
214	C.W. Bergstrom	April 21, 1992	PNW Show	Vancouver, Washington	1	88		
†	Yukihiro Kanemura	May 5, 1992	W*ING Show	Osaka, Japan	—	—	Kanemura defeated The Grappler on May 5, 1992 in Osaka, Japan to claim the title, as Grappler owned the physical belt representing the title. Kanemura was not officially recognized as champion by PNW. Kanemura continued to defend the title in W*ING as the "W*ING Pacific Northwest Heavyweight Championship".	
—	Deactivated	July 18, 1992	—	—	—	—	Title retired when Pacific Northwest Wrestling closed and reopened as Championship Wrestling USA.	
Blue Collar Wrestling (BCW)
215	"Badd Blood" BJ Darden	January 10, 2015	BCW Show	Portland, Oregon	1	425	"Badd Blood" BJ Darden was awarded the reactivated championship when Blue Collar Wrestling joined the NWA.	
—	Vacated	March 10, 2016	BCW Show	N/A	—	—	"Badd Blood" BJ Darden vacated the title upon winning the NWA Continental Heavyweight Championship.	
216	Buddy Highway	March 17, 2016	BCW Show	Portland, Oregon	1	143	Highway defeated Demarcus James, Havoc, and Ares Toretto in four-way tournament final to win the vacant title.	
217	Tommy Celcious	August 7, 2016	BCW Show	Portland, Oregon	1	13		
218	Dave Hollenbeck	August 20, 2016	BCW Show	Portland, Oregon	1	1		
219	Tommy Celcious	August 21, 2016	BCW Show	Portland, Oregon	2	29		
220	Buddy Highway	September 18, 2016	BCW Show	Portland, Oregon	2	28		
221	Tommy Celcious	October 16, 2016	BCW Show	Portland, Oregon	3	14		
222	Buddy Highway	October 30, 2016	BCW Show	Portland, Oregon	3	35		
223	Gregor Petrov	December 4, 2016	BCW Show	Portland, Oregon	3	300	Petrov defeated Highway in a three-way match that also involved Jeff Cobb.	
—	Deactivated	September 30, 2017	—	—	—	—	The championship was retired when the NWA terminated the contracts with its member promotions.	

== See also ==
- Pacific Northwest Wrestling
- National Wrestling Alliance
