= Beauregarde (wrestler) =

American professional wrestler and musician (1936–2024)

Personal information
- Born: Larry A. Pitchford; April 29, 1936 Lima, Ohio, U.S.
- Died: July 22, 2024 (aged 88) Honesdale, Pennsylvania, U.S.

Professional wrestling career
- Ring name(s): Beauregarde; Beautiful Beauregarde; Eric the Golden Boy
- Billed height: 6 ft 1 in (185 cm)
- Billed weight: 260 lb (118 kg)
- Billed from: "The Sensation of the Nation"
- Trained by: Dean Ho; Mr. Fuji
- Debut: 1963
- Retired: 1979

Larry A. Pitchford (April 29, 1936 – July 22, 2024), better known by his ring name Beauregarde, was an American professional wrestler and musician.

== Professional wrestling career ==
Pitchford's wrestling career began in 1963, touring the Philippines as "Eric the Golden Boy". Given the name Beauregarde by fellow wrestler Ripper Collins, he next debuted as a heel in Hawaii before returning to Portland. By 1970, he had become one of the biggest names on the NWA's Pacific Northwest Wrestling circuit, and won the NWA Pacific Northwest Tag Team Championship in 1968 (teamed with Lonnie Mayne), 1969 (with Roger Kirby), 1970 (with The Claw) and 1971 (with Dutch Savage).

Beauregarde was renowned for his unique wrestling moves (and finishing move "The Thumb") and characters he created for himself. On match days, he would find a historic figure whose date of birth fell on that day and pretend to be them during the match and in interviews.

In 1971, he released an album bearing his stage name, Beauregarde, featuring Greg Sage of Wipers on guitar. Beauregarde enlisted Sage, then 17 years old, after overhearing him playing guitar for a friend's band at Sound Productions studio in Portland in 1969.

In 1973, he managed the tag team of Brute Bernard and Jay York in Jim Crockett's Mid Atlantic Championship Wrestling promotion.

== Retirement and later life ==
After retiring from wrestling in 1979, he bought a sheet-rock company in Florida where he lived and spent most of his time fishing.

On February 4, 2006, Beauregarde made his first wrestling-related appearance in many years at Hardkore Championship Wrestling's Incredible 8 Tournament in South Florida, where he was one of the first "HCW Honorable Contribution to Wrestling Award" recipients along with wrestlers Rusty Brooks, Stephen "Big Daddy" DiBlasio and "Outlaw" JR James.

Beauregarde died at a nursing home in Honesdale, Pennsylvania, on July 22, 2024, at the age of 88.

== Championships and accomplishments ==
- Pacific Northwest Wrestling
  - NWA Pacific Northwest Tag Team Championship (5 time) - with Dutch Savage (1 time), Lonnie Mayne (2 times), Roger Kirby (1 time), and The Claw (1 time)
