= Don Manoukian =

American football player and wrestler (1934–2014)

Personal information
- Born: June 9, 1934; Merced, California, U.S.
- Died: September 23, 2014 (aged 80); Reno, Nevada, U.S.
- Listed height: 5 ft 7 in (1.70 m)
- Listed weight: 242 lb (110 kg)

Career information
- College: Stanford

Career history
- 1958: San Francisco 49ers*
- 1960: Oakland Raiders
- * Offseason or practice squad member only
- Stats at Pro Football Reference

Donald J. Manoukian (June 9, 1934 – September 23, 2014) was an American football guard and professional wrestler of Armenian descent from Reno, Nevada.

== American football career ==
An alumnus of Reno High School and Stanford University (class of 1957), Manoukian played professional football for the Salinas Packers of the Pacific Football Conference in 1958 and with the Oakland Raiders as a member of the American Football League team's inaugural 1960 season.

== Professional wrestling career ==
Determining that professional wrestling would be more lucrative (and in part because of his diminutive stature - estimates of his height ranged from between 5 feet 5 inches to 5 feet 9 inches), he switched to wrestling and spent nine years touring the United States and Japan, primarily as a heel.

Occasionally wrestling under the ring name Don the Bruiser, he won several championships as both a singles wrestler and a tag team wrestler. He won several titles in Pacific Northwest Wrestling, including the Heavyweight Championship in 1964. Previously he won the NWA Pacific Northwest Tag Team Championship twice, once with Kurt von Poppenheim in 1959 and two years later with Shag Thomas. He also regularly teamed with Dick Beyer, with whom he won both the WWA International Television Tag Team Championship and the Los Angeles version of the NWA International Television Tag Team Championship.

== Personal life ==
By 1967, Manoukian had retired into a life of real estate and business investment. His outgoing and humorous personality made him popular as a master of ceremonies at events throughout the Reno area in his later life. He died September 23, 2014, at the age of 80 following a brief illness. He had at least two wives and three children.

== Championships and accomplishments ==
- Cauliflower Alley Club
  - Men's honoree (1997)
- Pacific Northwest Wrestling
  - NWA Pacific Northwest Heavyweight Championship (1 time)
  - NWA Pacific Northwest Tag Team Championship (2 times) - with Kurt von Poppenheim (1) and Shag Thomas (1)
- Worldwide Wrestling Associates
  - WWA International Television Tag Team Championship (1 time) - with Dick Beyer
- Southwest Sports, Inc.
  - NWA Texas Heavyweight Championship (1 time)

== See also ==
- List of gridiron football players who became professional wrestlers
