= 1st Battalion, 30th Field Artillery Regiment =

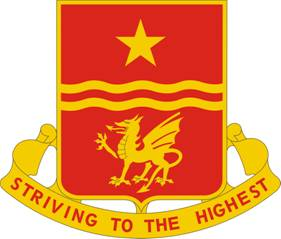
- 30th FA distinctive unit insignia
- Active: 1918 - present
- Country: (United States)
- Branch: United States Army
- Type: Field Artillery
- Role: training
- Size: battalion
- Part of: 428th Field Artillery Brigade
- Home station: Fort Sill

The 1st Battalion, 30th Field Artillery Regiment is a field artillery training battalion assigned to the 428th Field Artillery Brigade of the United States Army Field Artillery School at Fort Sill, OK. The battalion teaches Field Artillery Basic Officer Leaders Course, Phase 2 (BOLC-B); Warrant Officer Basic Course (WOBC); Warrant Officers' Advanced Course (WOAC), Captain's Career Course (CCC) and functional courses.

== Mission ==
The Hard Charger Battalion executes Initial Military Training and Professional Military Education to develop physically fit, competent, resilient, confident and adaptable Field Artillery Leaders to the operating force; individually capable of immediately contributing to their unit of assignment by integrating and executing lethal and non-lethal fires.

== Lineage and honors ==
=== Lineage ===
- Constituted 5 July 1918 in the National Army as Battery A, 30th Field Artillery, an element of the 10th Division.
- Organized 10 August 1918 at Camp Funston, Kansas.
- Demobilized 5 February 1919 at Camp Funston, Kansas.
- Reconstituted 24 March 1923 in the Regular Army as Battery A, 30th Field Artillery.
- Activated 4 June 1941 at Camp Roberts, California.
- Reorganized and redesignated 18 May 1944 as Battery A, 521st Field Artillery Battalion.
- Redesignated 1 May 1945 as Battery A, 30th Field Artillery Battalion.
- Inactivated 9 February 1949 at Fort Bragg, North Carolina.
- Activated 22 February 1950 at Fort Bragg, North Carolina.
- Reorganized and redesignated 25 June 1958 as Headquarters and Headquarters Battery, 1st Howitzer Battalion, 30th Artillery (organic elements constituted 2 June 1958 and activated 25 June 1958) in Dachau, Germany. Gyroscoped to Fort Sill 1958.
- Redesignated 1 September 1963 as the 1st Battalion, 30th Artillery.
- Redesignated 1 September 1971 as the 1st Battalion, 30th Field Artillery.
- Inactivated 15 May 1988 in Germany.
- Headquarters transferred 1 July 1995 to the United States Army Training and Doctrine Command and activated at Fort Sill, Oklahoma.

=== Campaign participation credit ===
- World War II: *Aleutian Islands, Rhineland, Central Europe
- Vietnam: *Defense; *Counteroffensive; *Counteroffensive, Phase II; *Counteroffensive, Phase III; *Tet Counteroffensive; *Counteroffensive, Phase IV; *Counteroffensive, Phase V; *Counteroffensive, Phase VI; *Tet 69/Counteroffensive; *Summer–Fall 1969; *Winter–Spring 1970; *Sanctuary Counteroffensive; *Counteroffensive, Phase VII

=== Decorations ===
- Valorous Unit Award, Streamer embroidered FISH HOOK (1st Battalion, 30th Artillery, cited; DA GO 43, 1972)
- Meritorious Unit Commendation (Army), Streamer embroidered VIETNAM 1966–1967 (1st Battalion, 30th Artillery, cited; DA GO 48, 1968)
- Meritorious Unit Commendation (Army), Streamer embroidered VIETNAM 1968 (1st Battalion, 30th Artillery, cited; DA GO 42, 1969)
- Meritorious Unit Commendation (Army), Streamer embroidered VIETNAM 1968–1969 (1st Battalion, 30th Artillery, cited; DA GO 39, 1970)
- Army Superior Unit Award, Streamer embroidered 1999–2000 (1st Battalion, 30th Field Artillery, cited; DA GO 29, 2001)
- Republic of Vietnam Cross of Gallantry with Palm, Streamer embroidered VIETNAM 1965–1969 (1st Battalion, 30th Artillery, cited; DA GO 59, 1969)
- Republic of Vietnam Cross of Gallantry with Palm, Streamer embroidered VIETNAM 1969–1970 (1st Battalion, 30th Artillery, cited; DA GO 42, 1972)
- Republic of Vietnam Cross of Gallantry with Palm, Streamer embroidered VIETNAM 1970–1971 (1st Battalion, 30th Artillery, cited; DA GO 42, 1972)
- Republic of Vietnam Civil Action Honor Medal, First Class, Steamer embroidered VIETNAM
