= The Grappler =

American retired professional wrestler (born 1958)

Len Denton
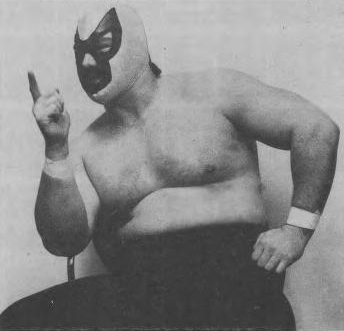
- Denton as The Masked Grappler, c. 1981

Personal information
- Born: Edward Lynn Denton; August 25, 1958 (age 67) Humble, Texas, U.S.

Professional wrestling career
- Ring name(s): Dirty White Boy #2; The Grappler; Len Denton; Masked Grappler #2
- Billed height: 5 ft 10 in (1.78 m)
- Billed weight: 260 lb (118 kg)
- Debut: 1977
- Retired: March 5, 2016

Edward Lynn "Len" Denton (born August 25, 1958) is an American retired professional wrestler, better known by his ring name, The Grappler.

== Professional wrestling career ==
Len Denton worked early in his career under a few different monikers and wrestled all over the territories across North America. His first real push came in the Southern territories first capturing titles in the Mid-South promotion. In Memphis with a young Jim Cornette as his manager he was teamed with Tony Anthony to become The Grapplers, Denton was the main star. The Grapplers would eventually leave Memphis and travel to the Central States area winning tag team gold there as well. Winning the AWA Southern Tag Titles and feuding with the Fabulous Ones. They then teamed with manager Jimmy Hart to become The Dirty White Boys. They achieved some success with this new gimmick, but then went back to The Grapplers gimmick.

At this point in their careers Anthony and Denton split up, with Anthony wrestling as The Dirty White Boy, and Denton taking the Grappler gimmick to Texas before eventually moving on to the Pacific Northwest. While Denton was wrestling there in the early 1990s, a local jobber named Bobby Blair assumed the "Dirty White Boy" moniker, though he had no connection to Anthony.

The Grappler has an extensive history in Mid-South Wrestling as a wrestler and in the Pacific Northwest as wrestler, booker, promoter, trainer and most recently (after neck surgery) a manager. The Grappler is one of the last remaining wrestlers from the NWA Pacific Northwest (Portland Wrestling) days. In February 1988, he challenged Curt Hennig for the AWA World Heavyweight Championship, which was marred by controversy, as the title was held up due to the match ending in a no-contest. A rematch was held on March 5, but he was defeated by Hennig's replacement, The Assassin, who helped Hennig regain the title.

Jake "The Snake" Roberts claims that in a Mid-South Wrestling bout, he put Denton in a front facelock. During the move Jake tripped on Denton's foot and fell backwards, causing Denton to fall on his head. As a result, Roberts claims to have invented the professional wrestling move known as the DDT.

In 1998, Denton worked for World Championship Wrestling under his real name. Of note is his title match against the undefeated WCW United States Champion Bill Goldberg on the May 11, 1998 edition of Monday Nitro. Play-by-play announcer Mike Tenay described Denton as "a very accomplished veteran grappler."

The Grappler was active as a wrestler for and operated as the president of the booking committee for the new Portland Wrestling from 2001 to 2006.

The Grappler announced his "return from retirement" on January 10, 2010. He would be working as the head booker for a small Portland Oregon pro wrestling company known as the North West Wrestling Alliance (NWWA). As of August 2010 Denton was working as the booker for DOA, NWWA, and Portland Wrestling in Portland, Oregon. As of November 2012, he was also a booker for Portland Wrestling Uncut, a revival of the original Portland Wrestling promotion (then owned by Don and Barry Owen, now owned by Don Coss and co-booked by Rowdy Roddy Piper). That promotion closed in early 2013.

On August 11, 2013, The Grappler appeared on Championship Wrestling from Hollywood and stated his intention to manage an up-and-coming wrestler and create a successor to the legacy of The Grappler.

In October 2013, The Grappler managed Jeremy Blanchard in the West Coast Wrestling Connection when Blanchard won the WCWC Legacy Championship. In December 2013, The Grappler recreated the "Wrecking Crew" with a new Grappler (Erik Baeden), Jeremy Blanchard, Othello and Alexander Hammerstone. He now appears with the Wrecking Crew on the WCWC's weekly television broadcast on KPDX-TV.

The Grappler wrestled his last match on March 5, 2016, defeating Grappler 3 at WCWC and retired.

== Championships and accomplishments ==
- Cauliflower Alley Club
  - Men's Wrestling Award (2015)
- Central States Wrestling
  - NWA Central States Tag Team Championship (2 times) – with Tony Anthony
- Continental Wrestling Association
  - AWA Southern Tag Team Championship (1 time) - with Tony Anthony
- Iconic Heroes Wrestling Excellence
  - Southern Wrestling Hall of Fame (2015)
- Mid-South Wrestling Association
  - Mid-South Mississippi Championship (2 times)
  - Mid-South North American Championship (1 time)
  - Mid-South Tag Team Championship (1 time) - with Super Destroyer
- Pacific Northwest Wrestling
  - NWA Pacific Northwest Heavyweight Championship (7 times)
  - NWA Pacific Northwest Tag Team Championship (10 times) - with Terminator (1), Abbuda Dein (1), Scotty the Body (1), Brian Adams, (1), The Equalizer (2), Don Harris (1), and Steve Doll (3)
- Ring Around The Northwest Newsletter
  - Wrestler of the Year (1987)
- Southwest Championship Wrestling
  - SCW Southwest Tag Team Championship (2 times) - with Tony Anthony
- West Coast Wrestling Connection
  - WCWC Legacy Championship (1 time)
- World Class Championship Wrestling
  - NWA Texas Heavyweight Championship (1 time)

== Bibliography ==
- Grappler: Memoirs of a Masked Madman (2014) – with Joe Vithayathil
