= Dave Sullivan (wrestler) =

American wrestler, college football coach and college athletics administrator (born 1960)

Personal information
- Born: William Adolph Danenhauer Jr. December 1, 1960 (age 65) Baltimore, Maryland, U.S.
- Education: University of Nebraska Omaha

Professional wrestling career
- Ring name(s): American Hawkwind; Captain Ron; Dave Sullivan; Evad Sullivan; The Equalizer
- Billed height: 6 ft 5 in (196 cm)
- Billed weight: 304 lb (138 kg)
- Billed from: Daytona, Florida
- Trained by: Len Denton
- Debut: 1989
- Retired: 2001

William Adolph Danenhauer Jr. (born December 1, 1960) is an American retired professional wrestler, college football coach, and college athletics administrator. He is best known for his appearances with World Championship Wrestling from 1993 to 1996 under the ring name Dave Sullivan, where he played the dyslexic brother of Kevin Sullivan. Danenhauer served as the head football coach at Dana College in Blair, Nebraska from 2003 to 2009, compiling a record of 22–55.

== Early life and football career ==
Dannenhauer attended Westside High School, where both he and his brother wrestled. He and his brother attended the University of Nebraska Omaha, where they played football for the Omaha Mavericks. Dannenhauer went on to play in the short-lived United States Football League (USFL) before ending his playing career. He went on to serve as an assistant coach for the Mavericks before joining Washburn University as offensive coordinator for the Washburn Ichabods.

== Professional wrestling career ==
=== Early career (1989–1993) ===
In 1989, Danenhauer decided to become a wrestler after meeting Harley Race at a high school tournament. He trained under Len Denton and debuted later that year. Danenhauer started wrestling in the National Wrestling Alliance territory Pacific Northwest Wrestling under the ring name "The Equalizer". He teamed with The Grappler as "The Wrecking Crew", with the duo winning the NWA Pacific Northwest Tag Team Championship on two occasions.

In 1990, he would tour on and off with Catch Wrestling Association for two years under the name "The Barbarian". He also occasionally wrestled under this name in France in matches taped for the second season of New Catch, aired on satellite TV channel Eurosport.

In 1991, he briefly wrestled in New Japan Pro-Wrestling, most notably losing a match to Scott Norton on March 21 at the Tokyo Dome.

In 1992, Danenhauer left PNW for the Global Wrestling Federation where he wrestled as "Captain Ron". He worked in Puerto Rico for the World Wrestling Council. He also toured the United Kingdom for All Star Wrestling under the name "American Hawkwind." (as the name "Barbarian" was already taken by Karl Kramer) and wrestled on S4C's Welsh language Reslo TV wrestling show as "Renegade Warrior"

=== World Championship Wrestling (1993–1996) ===
In 1993, Danenhauer joined World Championship Wrestling as The Equalizer, and teamed briefly with Rick Rude as his tag team partner/bodyguard. They feuded with Dustin Rhodes and Road Warrior Hawk. He also teamed with Paul Orndorff.

His biggest push started in the early spring of 1994 when he dropped "The Equalizer" name and became "Dave Sullivan" the dyslexic brother of Kevin Sullivan who regularly mispronounced his own forename as "Evad". He was being picked on by The Nasty Boys and brought Kevin in to help him against them. The Nasty Boys attacked Dave and injured his knee, Kevin then got Cactus Jack (whose tag team partner Maxx Payne was released from WCW in June 1994) to fill in for Dave in the feud with The Nasty Boys. In July 1994, Hulk Hogan made his WCW debut and Sullivan became his biggest fan and began wearing Hulk Hogan shirts to the ring. Kevin however hated Hogan, and problems started brewing. Sullivan started teaming with Hogan and Sting against Ric Flair and his henchmen, and Kevin soon turned on Dave and began using the song "I Wanna Be A Hulkamanic" (which was sung by Hogan and a children's choir) as his entrance music, Kevin and Dave had a massive feud that went into 1995 with Kevin defeating Dave at SuperBrawl V.

After his feud with Kevin ended, Sullivan also ended his alliance with Hogan. Sullivan is now using an instrumental version of "I Wanna Be A Hulkamaniac" and started a feud with Diamond Dallas Page who started challenging other wrestlers to arm wrestling matches with a stipulation if Page were to lose, then whoever beat him would go on a date with Kimberly (who was Page's real life wife at the time) and Sullivan challenged Page to an arm wrestling match, but Sullivan got injured during a match with Ric Flair and while Sullivan was recovering, Kimberly brought Sullivan a special gift which was a pet rabbit named Ralph who he used a his mascot. Page who was now furious over Kimberly giving Sullivan the rabbit and Page then made a stipulation at The Great American Bash where he and Sullivan would arm wrestle, if Page lost then Sullivan would date Kimberly, however if Sullivan lost, then Sullivan would surrender Ralph to Page. Sullivan won the match and the date, however on the date, a man in a rabbit suit (who eventually became Disco Inferno) showed up and said that Page cooked him rabbit stew, Sullivan went to his car and saw that Ralph was safe but was attacked by Page and Max Muscle. As payback, Sullivan challenged Page to a regular wrestling match at Bash at the Beach in which Page won and the feud ended.

Sullivan's next feud was with Big Bubba Rogers who was allergic to rabbits. Bubba started wearing a surgical mask to keep from inhaling the allergens, but Sullivan would always pull it off and get the victory. Danenhauer left WCW in April 1996.

=== Later Career (1996–2001) ===
Sullivan worked for Tornado Pro Wrestling in Oklahoma from 1998 to 1999.

== Retirement and football coaching career ==
Danenhauer retired from professional wrestling in 2001 due to the cumulative impact of injuries sustained in his football and wrestling careers. He relocated to Bentonville, Arkansas, where he worked for Wal-Mart as a fitness trainer. In 2001, he began working as offensive coordinator for the Vikings football team of Dana College in Blair, Nebraska. He was appointed head football coach in 2003 and later athletic director.

In 2020 he was inducted into the Nebraska Pro Wrestling Hall of Fame. His Class also included Gorgeous George and Local Wrestler Tony Cortez.

"Dave Sullivan" came out of retirement in 2022 with the MWA Midwest Wrestling in Lincoln, Nebraska as a manager.

== Championships and accomplishments ==
- Empire Wrestling Association
  - EWA North American Championship (1 time)
- NWA Pacific Northwest Wrestling
  - NWA Pacific Northwest Tag Team Champion (2 times) – with The Grappler
- Professional Wrestling Federation
  - PWF Eastern States Championship (1 time)
  - PWF Tag Team Championship (2 times) – with Baby Huey (1) and George South (1)
- Southern States Wrestling
  - SSW Heavyweight Championship (1 time)
- United States Wrestling Federation
  - USWF Tag Team Championship (1 time) – with John Bradshaw
- Wrestling Observer Newsletter
  - Worst Gimmick (1994)
  - Worst Wrestler (1993, 1994)

== Head coaching record ==
Year	Team	Overall	Conference	Standing	Bowl/playoffs
Dana Vikings (Great Plains Athletic Conference) (2003–2009)
2003	Dana	2–9	2–8	10th	
2004	Dana	2–9	1–9	T–10th	
2005	Dana	5–6	4–6	T–6th	
2006	Dana	6–5	5–5	5th	
2007	Dana	4–7	3–7	9th	
2008	Dana	3–8	2–8	T–9th	
2009	Dana	0–11	0–10	T–10th	
Dana:		22–55	17–53		
Total:		22–55			

== See also ==
- List of gridiron football players who became professional wrestlers
