= Lonnie Mayne =

American professional wrestler (1944 – 1978)

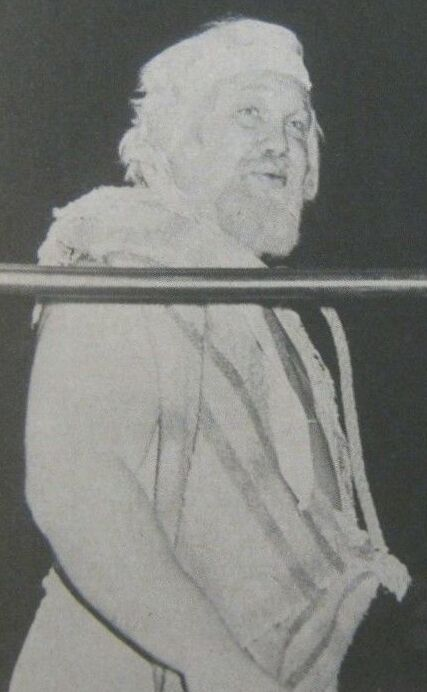
- Mayne, c. 1975

Personal information
- Born: Ronald Doyle Mayne; September 12, 1944 Fairfax, California, US
- Died: August 14, 1978 (aged 33) San Bernardino, California, US

Professional wrestling career
- Ring name(s): Moondog Mayne; The Blond Bomber; The One Man Gang; Mad Dog Mayne
- Billed height: 6 ft 0 in (183 cm)
- Billed weight: 275 lb (125 kg)
- Billed from: Portland, Oregon
- Trained by: Ken Mayne
- Debut: 1965

Ronald Doyle "Lonnie" Mayne (September 12, 1944 – August 14, 1978) was an American professional wrestler in the 1960s and 1970s who frequently went by the name Moondog Mayne. He wrestled in various National Wrestling Alliance territories, as well as the World Wide Wrestling Federation in 1973.

== Early life ==
Born in Fairfax, California, to Blanche and Kenneth Harvey "Kenny" Mayne (1915–1992), Lonnie Mayne grew up in Salt Lake City, Utah, and graduated from the College of Southern Utah, where he was an All American in Football. Lonnie's father Ken was a professional wrestler, and Lonnie chose to follow in his father's footsteps and become a professional wrestler as well.

== Professional wrestling career ==
Lonnie's famous nickname "Moondog" was acquired from Vince McMahon Sr., as he supposedly looked like a famed blind musician and poet named Louis Hardin who lived in New York until the early ’70s and was many times seen on the corner of 53rd or 54th Street and 6th Avenue in Manhattan, in a cloak while wearing a Viking helmet. Lonnie won his first NWA United States Heavyweight Championship (San Francisco version) by defeating then-champion Pat Patterson on December 29, 1973, in San Francisco. At the time, Lonnie was a villainous "heel" and Patterson was the good guy "face". Although the two had a long-standing feud, both before and after Lonnie defeated Patterson for the heavyweight belt, they eventually teamed to win the NWA (San Francisco version) tag team title. This occurred on August 8, 1975, in San Francisco when they defeated The Invaders.

During the 1960s & early 70's, Mayne allied with Oregon wrestler "Tough" Tony Borne, teaming together in tag-team bouts, and they also wrestled separately. They were initially "bad guys" and later become "good guys," making themselves two of the most popular wrestlers in the Pacific Northwest. Their first title win was against Pepper Martin and James "Shag" Thomas. During his time in Oregon, Apache Bull Ramos broke Mayne's arm, causing the bone to stick out through the skin. In 1973, Lonnie Mayne challenged Pedro Morales for the WWWF title in Madison Square Garden in a losing effort. From 1973 to 1978, Mayne found success in California, winning various singles titles, battling Chavo and Hector Guerrero, and Black Gordman in Los Angeles. In the Roy Shire Northern California area, he feuded with the likes of Pat Patterson and Don Muraco, and partnered with Ray Stevens to sellout crowds. In Texas, he had memorable matches with Mr. Wrestling II.

== Death ==
Mayne died on August 14, 1978, succumbing to injuries after his car crossed the Riverside Freeway meridian late on August 13 and collided with an oncoming vehicle. Mayne was scheduled to wrestle at an August 14 taping in Sacramento. News of his death did not reach the promoter, who assumed that Mayne had simply failed to arrive on time. The announcer thus concocted a cover story that Mayne was backstage, but enraged and refusing to come out and wrestle. The taped program did not air until five days later, by which time many fans were aware of Mayne's death almost a week earlier. More awkwardly still, a taped interview with Mayne's scheduled August 19 opponent Buddy Rose included Rose's hyperbolic threat that by the end of their match, Mayne would be carried out by pallbearers.

== Championships and accomplishments ==
- 50th State Big Time Wrestling
  - NWA Hawaii Heavyweight Championship (1 time)
  - NWA Hawaii Tag Team Championship (3 times) - with Ripper Collins (2), and Sweet Daddy Siki (1)
- Georgia Championship Wrestling
  - NWA Macon Tag Team Championship (1 time) - with Luke Graham
- NWA Big Time Wrestling
  - NWA Texas Heavyweight Championship (1 time)
- NWA Hollywood Wrestling
  - NWA Americas Heavyweight Championship (2 times)
  - NWA Americas Tag Team Championship (1 time) - with Ron Bass
- NWA San Francisco
  - NWA United States Heavyweight Championship (San Francisco version) (3 times)
  - NWA World Tag Team Championship (San Francisco version) (3 times) - with Pat Patterson (1), Ray Stevens (1), and Dean Ho (1)
- Pacific Northwest Wrestling
  - NWA Pacific Northwest Heavyweight Championship (11 times)
  - NWA Pacific Northwest Tag Team Championship (17 times) - with Tony Borne (11), Beauregard (1), Frankie Laine (1), Dutch Savage (2), Les Thornton (1), and Ron Bass (1)
- Ring Around The Northwest Newsletter
  - Wrestler of the Year (1967–1970)
  - Tag Team of the Year (1967–1969, 1972, 1977) with Tony Borne, Dutch Savage and Les Thornton

== See also ==
- List of premature professional wrestling deaths
