= 1957 in professional wrestling =

1957 in professional wrestling describes the year's events in the world of professional wrestling.

== List of notable promotions ==
Only one promotion held notable shows in 1957.

Promotion Name	Abbreviation
Empresa Mexicana de Lucha Libre	EMLL

== Calendar of notable shows ==
Date	Promotion(s)	Event	Location	Main Event
April	EMLL	1. Aniversario de Arena México	Mexico City, Mexico	
September 20	EMLL	EMLL 24th Anniversary Show	Mexico City, Mexico	Black Shadow and Alex Romano won the tournament in the finals of a torneo relampago 10,000 peso tag team tournament
(c) – denotes defending champion(s)

== Championship changes ==
=== EMLL ===
NWA World Middleweight Championship
incoming champion – Rolando Vera
No title changes

NWA World Welterweight Championship
incoming champion – Blue Demon
No title changes

Mexican National Heavyweight Championship
incoming champion - El Médico Asesino
No title changes

Mexican National Middleweight Championship
incoming champion – El Santo
No title changes

Mexican National Lightweight Championship
incoming champion – Vacant
Date	Winner	Event/Show	Note(s)
March 30	Juan Diaz	EMLL show	
July 17	Mima Ota	EMLL show	
July 18	Vacated	N/A	Championship vacated by the commission as Mishima Ota was not a Mexican citizen.

Mexican National Light Heavyweight Championship
incoming champion – Tarzan Lopez
Date	Winner	Event/Show	Note(s)
January	Vacated	N/A	
April 21	Espectro I	EMLL show	

Mexican National Welterweight Championship
incoming champion – Jalisco Gonzalez
Date	Winner	Event/Show	Note(s)
July 3	Karloff Lagarde	EMLL show	

Mexican National Tag Team Championship
New
Date	Winner	Event/Show	Note(s)
June 14	Los Hermanos Shadow (Black Shadow and Blue Demon)	EMLL show	Defeated Tarzán López and Enrique Llanes in an eight-team tournament final

Mexican National Women's Championship
incoming champion – Rosita Williams
No title changes

=== NWA ===
NWA Worlds Heavyweight Championship
Incoming champion – Lou Thesz
Date	Winner	Event/Show	Note(s)
November 14	Dick Hutton	NWA show	

== Debuts ==
- Debut date uncertain:
  - Bulldog Bob Brown
  - “Cowboy” Bob Ellis
  - Hiro Matsuda
  - Jarochita Rivero
  - Killer Karl Krupp
  - Larry Hennig
  - Les Thornton
  - Swede Hanson
- March – Rene Goulet
- August 8 – Adrian Street

== Births ==
- January 5 – Robert Swenson (died in 1997)
- January 7 – Mighty Wilbur(died in 2014)
- January 9 – El Egipcio(died in 2018)
- January 12 – B. Brian Blair
- January 22:
  - 911
  - Rita Chatterton
- January 26 – Road Warrior Hawk(died in 2003)
- February 10 – Chamaco Valaguez
- February 14 – Dr. Karonte (died in 2019)
- February 24 – C.W. Bergstrom
- March 11 – Rustee Thomas (died in 2025)
- April 3 – Daikokubō Benkei
- April 4 – Grigory Verichev (died in 2006)
- April 9 – Joel Deaton
- April 21 – Brutus Beefcake
- May 1:
  - Dave Taylor
  - Rossy Ogawa
- May 4 – Bart Vale
- May 9 – Mike Shaw(died in 2010)
- May 15 – Kevin Von Erich
- May 18 – Rob Bartlett
- May 25 – Dark Journey
- June 1 – Bobby Burns (wrestler)
- June 12 – Negro Navarro
- June 20 – Koko B. Ware
- June 25 – Floyd Creatchman(died in 2003)
- July 2 – Bret Hart
- July 13 – Irma Aguilar
- July 23 – Al Perez
- July 24 – Joseph Savoldi
- July 27 – Matt Borne(died in 2013)
- August 11 – Bill Alfonso
- August 14 – Gino Hernandez(died in 1986)
- August 20 – Rip Morgan
- August 23 – Fumihiro Niikura
- September 7 – Corporal Kirchner(died in 2021)
- September 9 – Garry Robbins (died in 2013)
- September 16 – D. C. Drake
- September 20 – Steve Gatorwolf (died in 2017)
- September 28 – Mountain Fiji (died in 2018)
- October 10 – Farmer Brooks(died in 2022)
- October 12 – Emilio Charles Jr.(died in 2012)
- October 16 – Lord Zoltan
- October 17 – Steve McMichael(died in 2025)
- October 19 – Wojo the BC Hulk
- October 24 – Italian Stallion
- October 25 – Atsushi Onita
- October 30 – Jackie Sato (died in 1999)
- November 7:
  - Tony Schiavone
  - Christopher Knight
- November 12 – Vladimir Petrov (died in 2024)
- November 14 – Stephen Petitpas
- November 17 – Ed Moretti
- November 24 – Tiger Mask / Satoru Sayama
- November 27 – Johnny Mantell
- December 8 – Reverend Slick

== Deaths ==
- April 6 – Gustav Frištenský, 77
- April 23 – Cora Livingston, 68/70
- August 9 – Babe Zaharias 45
- November 1 – Giovanni Raicevich, 77
