= George Wells (wrestler) =

American wrestler and Canadian Football League player (1947–2020)

- Wells, c. 1985

Personal information
- Born: George Oliver Wells; October 31, 1947 Oakland, California, U.S.
- Died: 2020 (aged 72)

Professional wrestling career
- Ring name(s): George Wells; Master Gee; Master G
- Billed height: 6 ft 1 in (1.85 m)
- Billed weight: 240 lb (110 kg)
- Debut: 1974
- Retired: 1992

George Wells
No. 53 (TOR), 64, 69 (SASK)
- Position: Defensive end

Personal information
- Listed height: 6 ft 2 in (1.88 m)
- Listed weight: 233 lb (106 kg)

Career information
- College: New Mexico State
- NFL draft: 1971: 5th round, 122nd overall pick

Career history
- 1971–1972: Toronto Argonauts
- 1972–1973: Hamilton Tiger-Cats
- 1974–1978: Saskatchewan Roughriders
- 1978: Hamilton Tiger-Cats

Awards and highlights
- Grey Cup champion (1972); CFL All-Star (1974); CFL East All-Star (1972); 3× CFL West All-Star (1974, 1975, 1976)

George Oliver Wells (October 31, 1947 – 2020) was an American professional wrestler and Canadian Football League player who competed in North American regional promotions during the early 1970s and 1980s including the Continental Wrestling Association (CWA), Pacific Northwest Wrestling (PNW), Stampede Wrestling, and the World Wrestling Federation (WWF, now WWE), most notably as the opponent of Jake "The Snake" Roberts at WrestleMania 2. It was during this live PPV match that Roberts, after having defeated Wells, had placed his pet snake "Damien" on Wells causing him to foam at the mouth.

A popular star in the San Francisco-area during the late 1970s, he is credited as being one of only four African-Americans (along with Bobo Brazil, Bearcat Wright and Rocky Johnson) to hold the now defunct San Francisco version of the NWA United States Heavyweight Championship.

== Early life ==
George Oliver Wells was born in Oakland, California on October 31, 1947. He graduated in 1966 from Oakland Technical High School and later attended Laney College and New Mexico State University playing college football and competed in the heavyweight division in several Amateur Athletic Union national tournaments.

== Football career ==
In 1971, he played in the American Bowl in Florida and was drafted 122nd overall by the San Francisco 49ers in the fifth round of the 1971 NFL draft. He later played eight seasons in the Canadian Football League with the Toronto Argonauts, Hamilton Tiger-Cats and Saskatchewan Roughriders as a defensive end, earning All-Star honors for four years and playing in five play-off games and three Grey Cups, winning one. He also averaged 30 to 36 quarterback sacks during four of his last five seasons.

== Professional wrestling career ==
=== Early career (1974–1978) ===
In 1974, Wells began wrestling professionally in northern California during the off season although he lost early matches to Kinji Shibuya in Sacramento, California on March 20, Blackjack Slade in San Francisco, California on April 20 and Dick Slater in San Jose, California on May 13 and in a rematch at San Francisco on May 18, 1974. He would however score one of his earliest victories defeating Terry Garvin in Sacramento on December 26, 1974.

He would continue wrestling on televised events in the San Francisco area for the next three years and eventually scored impressive victories of veterans such as Mr. Saito, Norman Frederick Charles III, The Hangman, Butcher Vachon and, teaming with Al Madril, The Royal Kangaroos defeating them on January 26, 1977.

During early 1977, he would feud with Butcher Vachon dominating their matches in February and again teamed with Al Madril to defeat Vachon and the Black Marvel in a tag team match on February 23, 1977.

Wells would later briefly feud with Bob Roop, Buddy Austin and Hiro Ota during late March and early April, losing to Roop on April 2 although he later defeated him in a rematch via disqualification seven days later. Losing to Hiro Ota on April 13, he later defeated Mr. Saito on April 27 and teamed with Moondog Mayne to defeat Hiro Ota and Tank Patton three days later on April 30.

Although teaming with Darling Dagmar and Pepper Gomez in a 6-man tag team match against Bob Roop, Marie Laverau and The Masked Superstar on May 11, Wells experienced a brief losing streak after being defeated by Bob Roop on May 14 and Mr. Saito on May 28 and later left the San Francisco-area.

=== Stampede Wrestling (1978–1979) ===
In early 1978, he began wrestling for Stampede Wrestling and teaming with Jerry Morrow defeated Mr. Hito and Michael Martel in February 1978 although they lost the titles to Norman Frederick Charles III and the Cuban Assassin later that year. He also had a short stint in Gene and Mike LeBelle's World Wrestling Alliance fighting to a draw with Bad News Allen in Los Angeles, California on July 13, 1979.

=== National Wrestling Alliance territories (1979–1984) ===
==== St. Louis and Central States (1979–1980) ====
While in the St. Louis-area, he substituted for Matt Borne teaming with Frank Hill to defeat Roger Kirby and Steve Hall on September 14 as well as defeating The Turk by disqualification on October 15 and teamed with Dick the Bruiser and David von Erich in a 6-man tag team match to defeat Lord Alfred Hayes, "Bulldog" Bob Brown and Ox Baker on October 19, 1979.

After officially retiring from professional football in 1980, he began competing in Central States Wrestling teaming with Pat O'Connor to defeat Pak Song and Ron McFarlane (substituting for an injured Mongol) on March 28 and later teamed with O'Connor and Dick the Bruiser in a 6-man tag team match against Bulldog Bob Brown, Dick Murdoch and Ed Wiskowski on April 11, 1980.

He would also team with Kerry Brown losing to Takachiho and Pak Song in St. Louis, Missouri on April 7 although they would later defeat Billy Howard and Ed Wiskoski in Kansas City, Missouri on June 5.

Entering singles competition, he fought to a draw against Ed Wiskowski on April 25 before losing to him in a rematch on June 7 for the NWA United States Heavyweight Championship (he had previously held the title since defeating Bob Sweetan on December 12, 1979) and was defeated by Takachio on June 13. Later that year, he began feuding with Dewey Robertson losing to him and Swede Hanson in a tag team match with Don Kernodle on September 9, although he later defeated him in a singles match in Forest City, North Carolina on September 11, 1980.

==== Mid-Atlantic and return to CSW (1980–1984) ====
The two would begin teaming with each other later that year, defeating The Sheepherders in Spartanburg, South Carolina on December 6, six days later, defeated them for the Mid-Atlantic Tag Team titles in Richmond, Virginia on December 12, 1980. Returning to Canada for a one-time appearance defeating Sgt. Jacques Goulet and Ben Alexander in Toronto, Ontario on December 28, they continued to defend their titles in the Carolinas throughout the next year defeating Kim Duk and Tenryu on January 1 and in a rematch four days later on January 5 and continued to feud with Goulet teaming with Kim Duk, Swede Hanson and Gene Lewis in unsuccessful attempts to win the tag team titles. Wells and Kernodle would remain undefeated until February 19 when they lost the titles to Mr. Fuji and Tenryu in Norfolk, Virginia.

Although continuing to team with each other, losing in a rematch against Mr. Fuji and Tenryu on April 5, they would eventually break up following their victory over Gene Lewis and Tenryu on May 12, 1980.

Wells remained in the Mid-Atlantic region for a few more months and defeated Swede Hanson by disqualification on January 20, 1981 before leaving the territory and later defeated Jerry Stubbs for the NWA Alabama Heavyweight title before losing it to Jimmy Golden that same year. Wells would again face Kernodle upon returning to Central States Wrestling, defeating Kernodle and Ray Hernandez in a tag team match with Mark Romero on June 10 and again in a singles match on July 15, 1983. He would later team with Ron Ritchie to defeat The Sheiks (Roger Kirby & Abdullah the Great) to become the Central States tag team champions in August before losing the titles back to them that same month.

Touring the Midwest with the short-lived USA Pro promotion in 1984, he was the last heavyweight champion appearing at the last event defeating Tom Zenk in Minneapolis, Minnesota on March 28, 1984.

=== World Wrestling Federation (1984–1986) ===
In late 1984, he debuted in the World Wrestling Federation, where he was generally used as a preliminary wrestler regularly appearing on WWF Prime Time Wrestling. Wells experience some slight success teaming with Lanny Poffo, and also was the first regular tag team partner of Bret Hart. The team worked five matches on Prime Time together as faces. Hart quickly turned heel, however, and had a short feud with Wells on television. Hart defeated Wells in a singles match, and then along with Jim Neidhart, The Hart Foundation defeated Wells and various tag partners on six different occasions on Prime Time Wrestling and Championship Wrestling. Wells would once again feud with Kernodle losing to him May 29, in a 6-man tag team match with Swede Hanson and Ivan Putski against Big John Studd and manager Bobby "The Brain" Heenan on May 30 and again in later singles rematches in East Rutherford, New Jersey on June 7, Kalamazoo, Michigan on July 10 and Milwaukee, Wisconsin on July 12. Wells would also appear at several major WWF events, losing to Adrian Adonis at the WWF Michigan State Fair supercard on August 28, 1985 and Jake "The Snake" Roberts at WrestleMania 2 on April 7, 1986. After WrestleMania 2, Wells continued having matches against Iron Mike Sharpe, Jimmy Jack Funk, Dory Funk Jr., Sika and Kamala until leaving the WWF in fall of 1986.

=== Later career (1986–1992) ===
Leaving the WWF in October 1986, he began wrestling in the Memphis-based Continental Wrestling Association as Master Gee and feuded with Junkyard Dog and Butch Reed (reigniting a feud Wells had with Reed in Mid-South Wrestling in 1984), breaking the leg of Reed during a "ghetto street fight" when he refused to release Reed from a modified figure-four leglock.

He would also appear in World Class Championship Wrestling feuding with the Dingo Warrior, he and WCCW World Tag team Champion Matt Borne lost the tag team titles to the Dingo Warrior and Lance von Erich on November 17 (Wells had substituted for an injured Buzz Sawyer). After losing to the Dingo Warrior in a "chain match" at the supercard Thanksgiving Star Wars '86 on November 27 and Lance von Erich at Christmas Star Wars '86 on December 25, Wells left the promotion. After a brief appearance in Dominic Denucci's NWF All-Star Wrestling in 1987, losing to Sgt. Jacques Goulet in a televised match on September 8, Wells would remain inactive for most of the late 1980s until his eventual retirement in 1992.

== Personal life and death ==
Returning to Oakland, Wells was reported to be working as a drug counselor in the San Francisco Bay area as of 2005. Having suffered from drug-related issues throughout his athletic career, he primarily worked with teenage drug addicts.

On August 10, 2026, it was announced that Wells had died "some time ago", with his ex-wife Nancy stating that he "had passed away a few years back". On August 31, his son, Jason, clarified that Wells had died in early 2020, following kidney issues that required dialysis and a battle with diabetes.

== Championships and accomplishments ==
- 50th State Big Time Wrestling
  - Hawaiian Heavyweight Championship (1 time)
- Big Time Wrestling (San Francisco)
  - NWA United States Heavyweight Championship (San Francisco version) (1 time)
- Central States Wrestling
  - NWA Central States Tag Team Championship (1 time) – with Ron Ritchie
- Mid-Atlantic Championship Wrestling
  - NWA Mid-Atlantic Tag Team Championship (1 time) – with Dewey Robertson
- NWA All-Star Wrestling
  - NWA Canadian Tag Team Championship (Vancouver version) (1 time) – with Dean Ho
- NWA Hollywood Wrestling
  - NWA World Tag Team Championship (Los Angeles version) (1 time) – with Hector Guerrero
- NWA Tri-State
  - NWA Tri- State Tag Team Championship ( 1 time ) – with Frank Hill
- NWA Southeastern Championship Wrestling
  - NWA Alabama Heavyweight Championship (1 time)
- Stampede Wrestling
  - NWA International Tag Team Championship (Calgary version) (1 time) – with Jerry Morrow
- Western States Alliance
  - WSA Heavyweight Championship (1 time)

== See also ==
- List of gridiron football players who became professional wrestlers
