= Bob Della Serra =

Canadian professional wrestler (born 1951)

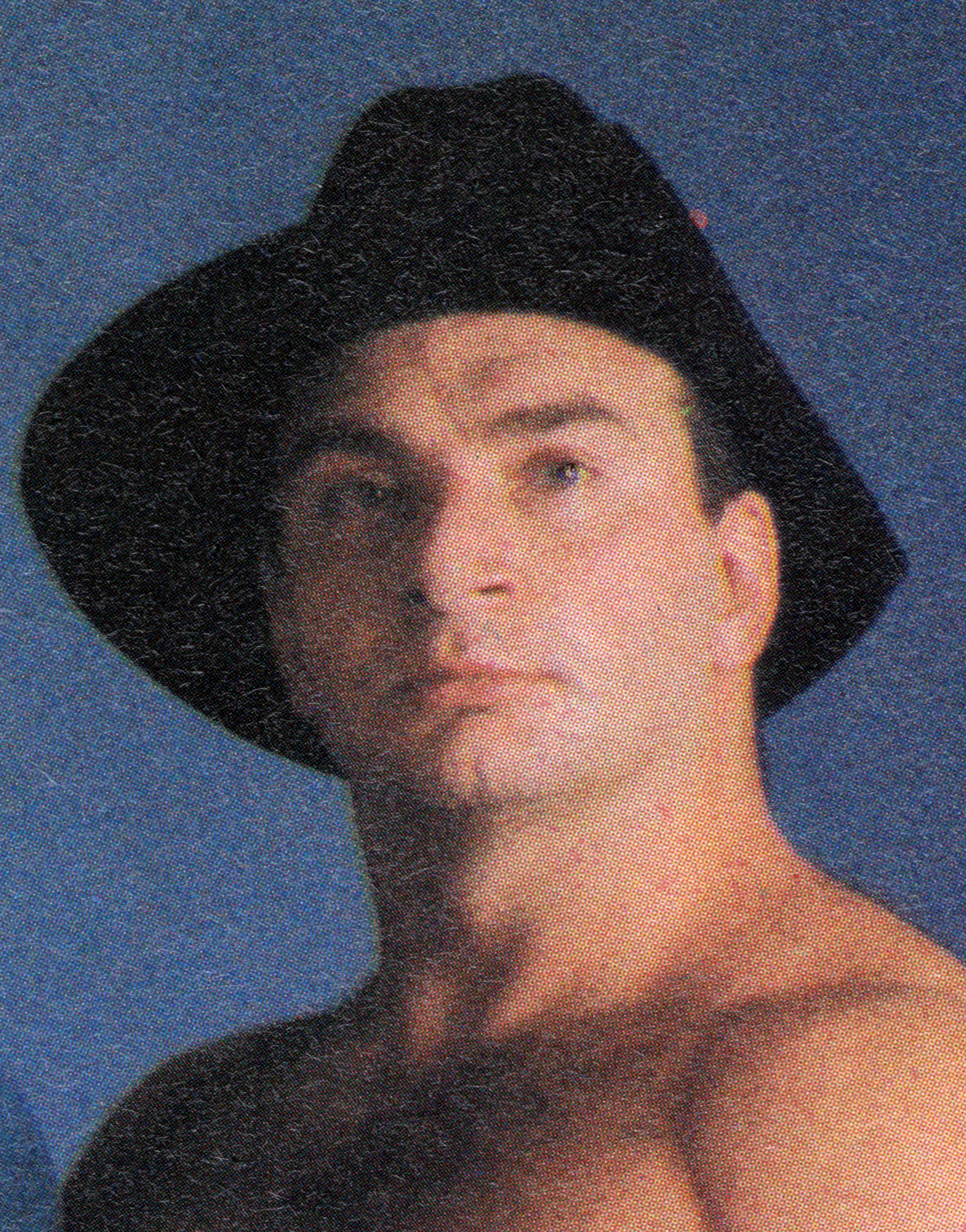
- Dellaserra as Johnny Heffernan in 1982

Personal information
- Born: Robert Dellaserra; March 3, 1951 (age 75) Montreal, Quebec, Canada

Professional wrestling career
- Ring name(s): Bob Della Serra; Johnny Heffernan; The UFO; Karl Steiner
- Billed height: 5 ft 11 in (1.80 m)
- Billed weight: 242 lb (110 kg)
- Debut: 1972
- Retired: 1988

Robert Dellaserra is a retired Canadian professional wrestler. He is best known by his ring name Bob Della Serra, Johnny Heffernan and The UFO who spent his career in Montreal, Calgary, Japan, Germany, Puerto Rico and Portland (Oregon).

== Professional wrestling career ==
Della Serra, born in Montreal, made his wrestling debut in 1972 for Grand Prix in Montreal. In 1974, he worked for Eastern Sports Association in Nova Scotia and New Brunswick.

In 1976, he made his debut in Japan as the masked UFO for International Wrestling Enterprise. He worked there until 1979.

In 1981, he worked in Switzerland and in Germany for Catch Wrestling Association.

Then in 1982 he teamed up with Don Kent (wrestler) as the Fabulous Kangaroos, where Della Serra took changed his name to "Johnny Heffernan" (or "Bobby Heffernan" at times) - a storyline cousin of Roy Heffernan. The team ended Terry and Dory Funk Jr.'s year and a half run with the WWC World Tag Team championship on May 1, 1982. Kent and Heffernan held the gold for less than two months before losing the WWC World Tag Team titles to Invader I and Pierre Martel. After a tour in Puerto Rico, Kent and Heffernan worked for Championship Wrestling from Florida (CWF). On January 5, 1983, the Kangaroos defeated Barry Windham and Ron Bass to win the NWA Florida Global Tag Team Championship. They held the titles four times between January and April 13, 1983, losing to and winning titles from such teams as Terry Allen and Scott McGhee, Terry Allen and The Midnight Rider, and Terry Allen and Brad Armstrong.

In 1983, he debuted for Montreal's Lutte Internationale where he became a household name. He teamed up with his brother Rocky Della Serra. In 1984, he worked in Japan's Universal Wrestling Federation (Japan) as The UFO and sometimes teamed with Rocky.

In 1985, he worked for New Japan Pro Wrestling as Karl Steiner (no relation/reference to the Steiner Brothers). Also worked for Portland Wrestling from 1985 to 1986.

In 1987, Lutte Internationale folded and Della Serra returned to Nova Scotia until 1988 where he retired from wrestling.

== Personal Life ==
Della Serra is the brother of Rocky Della Serra.

== Championships and accomplishments ==
- Championship Wrestling from Florida
  - NWA Florida Global Tag Team Championship (4 times) – with Don Kent (wrestler)
- NWA All-Star Wrestling
  - NWA Canadian Tag Team Championship (Vancouver version) (1 time) - with Igor Volkoff (1)
- Pacific Northwest Wrestling
  - NWA Pacific Northwest Tag Team Championship (1 time) - with Mike Miller (wrestler) (1)
- World Wrestling Council
  - WWC North American Tag Team Championship (2 times) – with Don Kent (2)
