= Buddy Rose =

American professional wrestler (1952–2009)

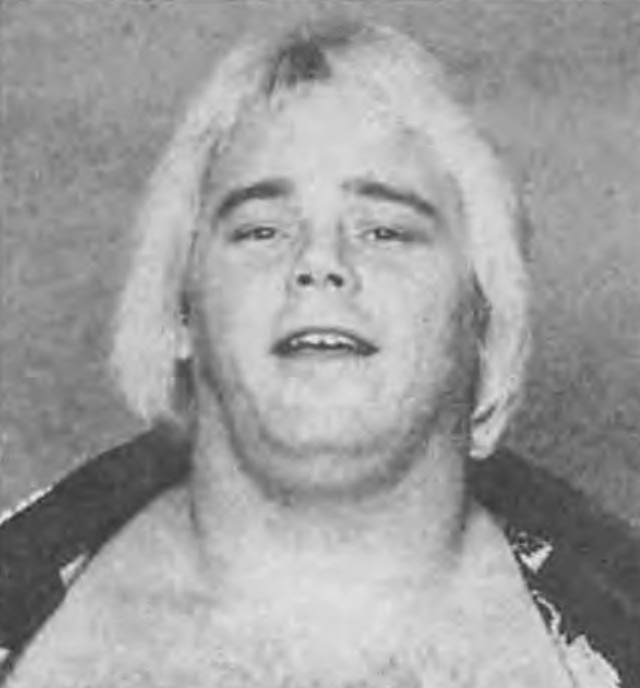
- Rose, c. 1984

Personal information
- Born: Paul E. Perschmann; November 27, 1952 Omaha, Nebraska, U.S.
- Died: April 28, 2009 (aged 56) Vancouver, Washington, U.S.
- Family: Matt Borne (ex-brother-in-law)

Professional wrestling career
- Ring name(s): Playboy Buddy Rose; The Executioner
- Billed height: 6 ft 1 in (185 cm)
- Billed weight: 271 lb (123 kg)
- Billed from: Las Vegas, Nevada; Parts Unknown (as The Executioner)
- Trained by: Verne Gagne; Billy Robinson
- Debut: 1973
- Retired: 2005

Paul E. Perschmann (November 27, 1952 – April 28, 2009) was an American professional wrestler, better known by his ring name, "Playboy" Buddy Rose. He wrestled primarily for the American Wrestling Association, World Wrestling Federation, and Pacific Northwest Wrestling.

== Early life ==
Paul E. Perschmann was born on November 27, 1952, in Omaha, Nebraska. In his youth, he participated in baseball, softball, and hockey.

== Professional wrestling career ==
=== American Wrestling Association (1973–1976) ===
Paul Perschmann was trained by Verne Gagne and Billy Robinson in the early 1970s. Under his own name, he made his debut as a babyface on December 3, 1973, in Rice Lake, Wisconsin, in a 15-minute draw with fellow campmate Bob Remus (better known as Sgt. Slaughter). He continued to wrestle under his own name for the duration of his initial tenure, facing such opponents as Billy Graham, Dusty Rhodes, Billy Robinson, and Jos LeDuc. After being defeated by Khosrow Vaziri (The Iron Sheik) at a house show in Milwaukee, WI on January 3, 1976, Perschmann departed from the promotion.

=== National Wrestling Alliance (1976–1982) ===
Perschmann joined NWA Western States and made his debut twelve days later, losing to Red Bastien at a house show in Amarillo, Texas, on January 15, 1976. He wrestled in several National Wrestling Alliance territories that year before settling in the collective's Pacific Northwest Wrestling promotion. He made his debut on October 15, 1976, and wrestled Rick Hunter to a draw. This was also the first time that he did not wrestle under his name, instead having been redubbed "Buddy Rose".

Now wrestling as Buddy Rose both in the PNW and other NWA outfits, he received his first NWA World Heavyweight Championship title opportunity when he faced Harley Race on May 24, 1977, in an unsuccessful effort in Portland, Oregon. However, later that year he would capture his first championship, teaming with Jesse Ventura to win the NWA Pacific Northwest Tag Team Title. After losing the titles that June, he would team with Ed Wiskoski (Colonel DeBeers) to regain them from Lonnie Mayne and Sam Oliver in a "loser leaves town" match on December 6, 1977. Rose would team on and off with Wiskoski for several decades afterwards, no matter whether the latter was using his "Polish Prince", "Mega Maharishi Imed", or "Colonel De Beers" gimmicks.

On May 17, 1978, Rose partnered with John Studd to win 50th State Big Time Wrestling's NWA Hawaii Tag Team Championship. They would lose them on June 14, 1978, in Honolulu to John Tolos and Steve Strong. Later that summer, Rose entered a tournament to crown the vacant NWA San Francisco United States Heavyweight Title. He won it on September 16, 1978, when he defeated Dean Ho, securing his first singles championship. In the PNW, Rose and Wiskoski were finally beaten for the PNW Tag-Team titles by Dutch Savage and Johnny Boyd on November 21, 1978.

By 1979, Perschmann was a mainstay of the PNW and one of their top attractions. At some point in the year Rose & Wiskoski regained the Pacific Northwest Tag Team Title. On May 8, 1979, in Portland, Rose wrestled PNW Heavyweight Champion "Rowdy" Roddy Piper to a draw, the start of a feud which Piper later credited with establishing his name in the business. Three days later, Rose regained the Big Time Wrestling United States Title by pinning Ron Starr. Still, his efforts to win the PNW's primary title remained unsuccessful as he was unable to defeat Piper or latter champion Stan Stasiak.

However, on November 17, 1979, Rose finally broke through when he defeated Stasiak to win the PNW Heavyweight Championship. His first title reign saw defenses against Roddy Piper, Ron Bass, King Parsons, and Don Leo Jonathan. He would finally lose the title on March 22, 1980, to Rick Martel. While he was initially unable to regain the championship, he feuded with Martel, Piper, and The Sheepherders for much of the year. On July 28, 1980, he and Wiskoski defeated The Sheepherders in a loser leaves town match; on August 8 Martel & Piper defeated them to win the vacant PNW Tag-Team Championship.

On August 16, 1980, Rose defeated Martel to regain the PNW Northwest Heavyweight Championship. Though he soon lost it to Roddy Piper, Rose then defeated Piper in a loser leaves town match on September 20 in Portland, regaining the championship. He successfully defended the title that winter against Jonathan Boyd and Sivi Afi before losing it to Jay Youngblood in early 1981. Rose would get a measure of revenge by defeating Youngblood in another loser leaves town match on May 12, 1981. On October 6, 1981, he captured the Northwest Heavyweight Championship for a third time, defeating Steve Regal in Portland. Regal would regain it eighteen days later in a rematch.

While continuing to be a mainstay in Portland Northwest Wrestling, Rose also traveled to fellow NWA territory Georgia Championship Wrestling in 1982. Teaming with Rip Oliver, they won two televised matches before losing to the Funk Brothers in the first round of a tournament to crown the NWA World Tag-Team Championship on February 28, 1982, in Atlanta. Back in PNW and five years after his first NWA World Heavyweight Championship match, Rose earned another shot on April 13, this time against Ric Flair. Flair, however, was victorious in a match refereed by Curt Hennig.

Rose next embarked on a tour of New Japan Pro-Wrestling that spring, wrestling opponents including Yoshiaki Yatsu, Yoshiaki Fujiwara, and Animal Hamaguchi. He returned to the PNW in June and had multiple matches with Matt Bourne before finally departing for the World Wrestling Federation.

=== World Wrestling Federation (1982–1983) ===
While still finishing up with the PNW, Rose made his WWF debut on June 1, 1982, at a Championship Wrestling taping in Allentown, Pennsylvania, at the Agricultural Hall.

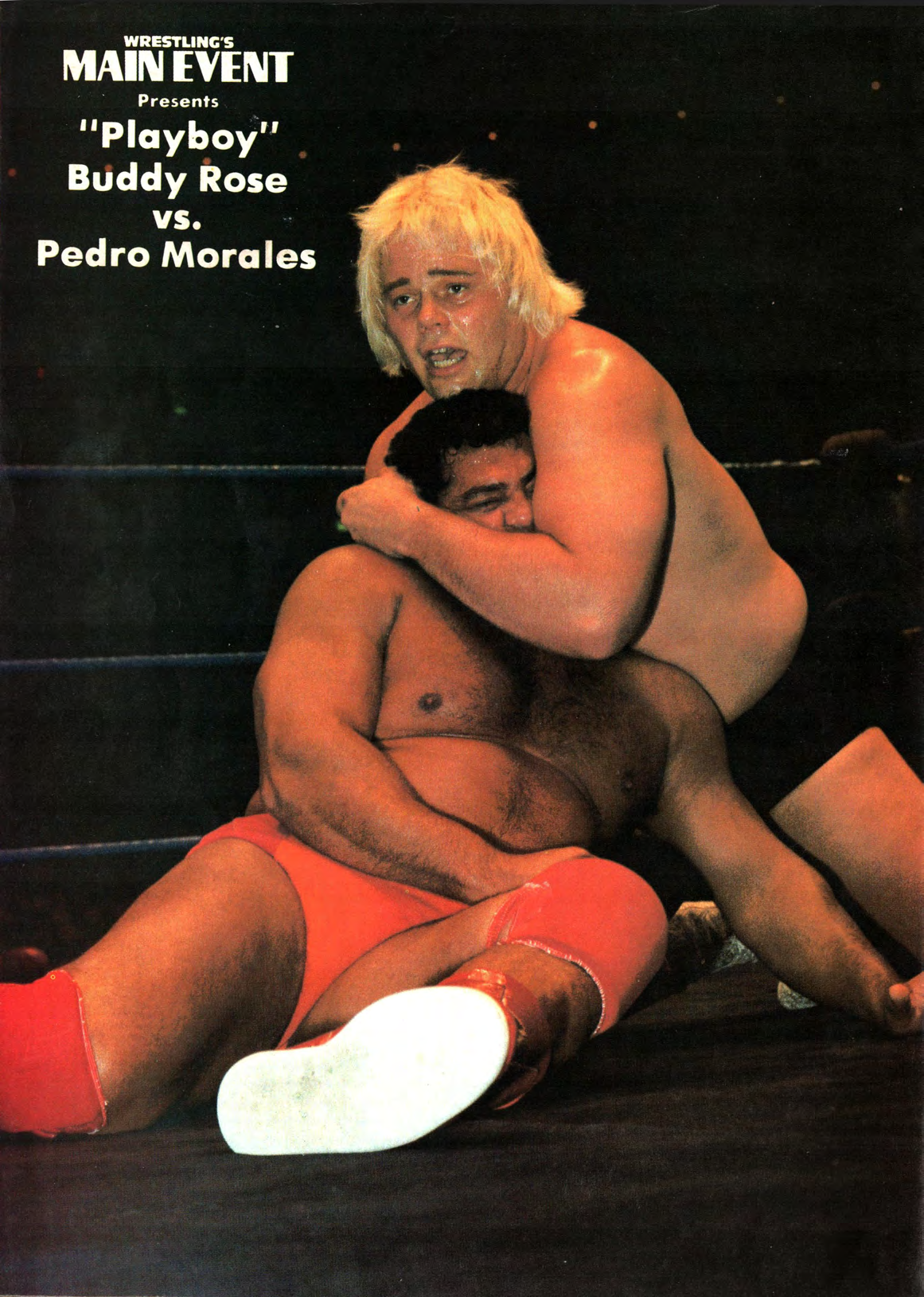
Rose (top) has Pedro Morales (bottom) in a reverse chinlock, circa 1983

Now managed by Grand Wizard and accompanied by two women to ringside (one was Sherri Martel and the other Judy Martin), he pinned Steve King. Rose wrestled twenty two matches at television tapings between June and August, which served to keep him in the public eye until he finished his PNW commitments and began the WWF house show loop. On August 30, 1982, he worked a main event against Bob Backlund for the WWF World Heavyweight Title, but was unsuccessful. Rose quickly moved to a house show feud with former WWF Tag-Team Champion Tony Garea and dominated the series.

On October 4, 1982, he challenged Pedro Morales for the Intercontinental Heavyweight Championship at Madison Square Garden; like the match with Backlund in August this too was also unsuccessful. Rose faced Morales numerous additional times but was unable to win the title. He eventually moved that winter to a house show series with Curt Hennig, where he found considerable success.

=== Pacific Northwest Wrestling (1983–1984) ===
Following another tour of New Japan Pro-Wrestling, Rose returned to the PNW on May 8, 1983, and defeated Jesse Barr. On August 20 he teamed with Brian Adidas to win the PNW Tag Team titles from Rip Oliver and The Assassin, but would lose the belts back eleven days later. On October 11, 1983, he teamed with former opponent Curt Hennig and captured the tag-team titles back from Oliver and the Assassin. Again the reign was short-lived as they in turn were beaten by Dynamite Kid and Oliver. Following a third tour of New Japan Pro-Wrestling, Rose returned to the PNW and defeated Rip Oliver to win the Heavyweight Championship at an event on April 28, 1984. He defended the title against Oliver and future tag-team partner Doug Somers before losing it later that year and returning to the World Wrestling Federation.

=== World Wrestling Federation (1984–1985) ===
Rose returned to the WWF in 1984. He appeared on Piper's Pit on the December 22 episode of Championship Wrestling and was now managed by Bobby Heenan. On the February 26, 1985, edition of Prime Time Wrestling he was defeated by Barry Windham. He was later put under a mask as "The Executioner", losing to Tito Santana in the opening match of the inaugural WrestleMania. This would be his last match, as he departed once more for the PNW.

=== National Wrestling Alliance (1985) ===
He returned on April 29 edition of PNW Portland Wrestling, losing to Steve Pardee via DQ. On May 21, 1985, the PNW held a 60th Anniversary Wrestling Extravaganza at the Portland Memorial Coliseum attended by an estimated 13,000; Rose was defeated by Roddy Piper at the event. Over the next two months he feuded with Billy Jack Haynes and Billy Two Eagles.

In August 1985 Rose began a tour of Championship Wrestling from Florida and formed a partnership with Rick Rude. Rose was more dominant in this run, defeating Billy Jack Haynes, Frank Lang, and Cocoa Samoa. On October 6, 1985, he earned a NWA Florida Southern Heavyweight Championship shot against Wahoo McDaniel but lost via DQ. He did capture the NWA Florida Bahamian Championship and held it until October 18, where he lost it to Tyree Pride in Nassau, Bahamas.

=== American Wrestling Association (1986–1987) ===
Ten years after his first run, Buddy Rose returned to the AWA on March 9, 1986, and defeated Scott Hall via disqualification at an event in St. Paul, Minnesota. He also renewed his tag-team partnership with Ed Wiskoski, who was now wrestling as Colonel DeBeers. Rose and DeBeers lost to AWA World Tag-Team Champions Scott Hall and Curt Hennig on March 23, 1986, leading him to quickly form a new team with Doug Somers.

On May 17, 1986, Rose and Somers defeated Hennig and Hall via countout, but won the AWA World Tag-Team Championship anyway via stipulation. That summer they began to feud with The Midnight Rockers, a series that Michaels would later credit as taking his team with Jannetty to the next level.

=== World Wrestling Federation (1990–1991) ===
Rose returned to the WWF on February 5, 1990, at a house show in Brandon, Manitoba, and was defeated by Hillbilly Jim. He made his televised return on the March 12 edition of Prime Time Wrestling, teaming up with Iron Mike Sharpe against The Hart Foundation. Rose was primarily used as an enhancement talent during this run, losing his televised matches to elevate other stars. Rose lost to Kerry Von Erich in Von Erich's WWF television debut on the July 1990 edition of Saturday Night's Main Event XXVII. In this run however Rose was not winless; he did secure pinfall wins against Jim Powers, Pez Whatley, Dale Wolfe, Jim Brunzell, and Dustin Rhodes on house shows.

Having gained a large amount of weight, Rose turned it into a comical gimmick; when the ring announcer introduced him and listed his weight at 317 pounds, Rose would angrily take the microphone away from the announcer, and claim to weigh "a slim, trim, 217 pounds"; this drew jeers from the crowd. On occasion, he would do one-handed push-ups and kip-ups in the ring, and challenge muscular opponents to a "pose-down." Rose claims that Vince McMahon told the locker room, "I want everybody to work out... except for Buddy," knowing that Rose's weight was his gimmick. Rose memorably appeared in a faux infomercial for the "Buddy Rose Blow Away Diet," which consisted of pouring powder all over himself and then "blowing away the fat" with a household fan; Rose looked exactly the same after the blow away.

On August 27, 1990, he wrestled Shane Douglas in the dark match of SummerSlam '90. Rose finally gained his first televised victory on the December 10, 1990, edition of Prime Time Wrestling, where he defeated Mario Mancini. Rose left the company after a January 14, 1991, house show encounter against Koko B. Ware in Huntington, West Virginia.

=== Pacific Northwest Wrestling (1991–1992) ===
Buddy Rose returned to Pacific Northwest Wrestling and began to experience a career revival. He made his debut on a television show on December 21, 1991, and upset PNW Champion Demolition Crush in a non-title match. Four days later on Christmas Day, Crush defeated Rose at a house show in Portland, Oregon. During the first half of 1992 Rose gained victories over CW Bergstrom, Mike Winner, and Brickhouse Brown, while falling in defeat to Jesse Barr and Bart Sawyer.

=== West Coast Championship Wrestling (1992–1993) ===
By May 1992 Rose had moved to West Coast Championship Wrestling out of Vancouver and entered a feud with Timothy Flowers. On September 26, 1992, he teamed with Michelle Starr to face Mighty Quinn and Mike Roselli for the vacant WCCW Tag-Team Championship, but were unsuccessful. On October 16, 1992, Rose and Starr defeated Quinn and Roselli to win the WCCW titles at a house show in Surrey, British Columbia. Their reign lasted until March 27, 1993, when they were defeated by Moondog Moretti and Timothy Flowers.

=== Oregon Pro Wrestling Federation (1994) ===
In 1994 Rose jumped to the Oregon Pro Wrestling Federation, a newly formed company owned by Billy Jack Haynes and Ron Barber. On February 2, 1994, he defeated Mike Miller to win the vacant OPWF Heavyweight Championship. Rose remained champion of the OPWF until April 16, when he lost the title to Scott Norton. That summer he began to team with Buddy Wayne and would win the OPWF Tag-Team Championship from Mike Miller and Lou Andrews.

=== Late career (1995–2005) ===
Rose made two appearances in the California-based All Pro Wrestling in 1995, before moving on to the fledgling American Wrestling Federation in 1996. In his first appearance he lost to Sgt. Slaughter at an event in Oakville, WA on August 16, 1996. He would wrestle in several other house shows that summer for the AWF. In 1997 he renewed his rivalry with Timothy Flowers in the International Championship Wrestling Promotion based in British Columbia.

In the mid-to-late 1990s, Rose hosted a call-in talk show on a Portland radio station. Rose managed the Butcher in the short-lived revival of Portland Wrestling. Rose's final match occurred at Wrestle Reunion 2005 in Tampa, Florida, where he teamed with Colonel DeBeers and Bob Orton Jr. against Jimmy Valiant, Roddy Piper and Jimmy Snuka. The match was billed as Jimmy Valiant's retirement match, but Rose also retired after the match. Rose continued to make personal appearances, and opened a wrestling training school with DeBeers in Portland.

== Personal life ==
Rose was first married to Lanette Lucinda Hansch. Buddy and Lanette had one daughter, Alexia, born in May 1977 in Portland, Oregon. Buddy's daughter has 4 children; Luke, Sofia, Lane, and Brooke, Buddy's grandchildren. He later married Toni Osborne (the sister of Matt Osborne), and they were divorced three months into their marriage. Buddy lastly married Tammy Marie Kelly, a wrestling fan living in the Pacific Northwest, she and Buddy were married from 1990 until his death in 2009. Buddy also had a brother named Gary. Rose enjoyed Motown music and had two dachshunds, Prince and Penny.

Rose battled a cocaine addiction for years, for which he later went to rehab as an outpatient for six weeks. He also had a lifelong struggle with obesity.

== Death ==
On April 28, 2009, Rose was found dead in his chair in front of his television at his home in Vancouver, Washington, by his wife. The medical examiner attributed his death to natural causes. Rose, who had struggled with his weight since the late 1980s, experienced problems with blood sugar and diabetes.

== Championships and accomplishments ==
- 50th State Big Time Wrestling
  - NWA Hawaii Heavyweight Championship (1 time)
  - NWA Hawaii Tag Team Championship (1 time) – with John Studd
- American Wrestling Association
  - AWA World Tag Team Championship (1 time) – with Doug Somers
- Cauliflower Alley Club
  - Other honoree (2004)
- NWA All-Star Wrestling
  - NWA Canadian Tag Team Championship (Vancouver version) (2 time) – with Chris Colt (1) and Rip Oliver (1)
  - NWA Pacific Coast Heavyweight Championship (Vancouver version) (1 time)
- NWA San Francisco
  - NWA United States Heavyweight Championship (San Francisco version) (2 times)
  - NWA World Tag Team Championship (San Francisco version) (1 time) – with Ed Wiskoski
- Oregon Professional Wrestling Federation
  - OPWF Heavyweight Championship (1 time)
  - OPWF Tag Team Championship (1 time) - with Buddy Wayne
- Pacific Coast Championship Wrestling
  - PCCW Tag Team Championship (1 time) - Buddy Wayne
- Pacific Northwest Wrestling
  - NWA Pacific Northwest Heavyweight Championship (8 times)
  - NWA Pacific Northwest Tag Team Championship (12 times) – with Jesse Ventura (2 times), Colonel DeBeers (4 times), Rip Oliver (2 times), Stan Stasiak (1 time), Brian Adias (1 time), Curt Hennig (1 time), and Avalanche (1 time)
- Pro Wrestling Illustrated
  - PWI ranked him # 265 of the 500 best singles wrestlers in the PWI 500 in 1992.
- Ring Around The Northwest Newsletter
  - Tag Team of the Year (1978, 1981, 1994) with Ed Wiskwoski, Rip Oliver and Buddy Wayne
  - Wrestler of the Year (1980–1981)
- Universal Independent Wrestling
  - UIW Heavyweight Championship (2 times)
- WWE
  - WWE Hall of Fame (Class of 2019)
