= Frank Townsend (wrestler) =

American professional wrestler

Personal information
- Born: March 20, 1933 Camden, New Jersey, United States
- Died: May 15, 1965 (aged 32) Puget Sound, Washington

Professional wrestling career
- Ring name(s): Frank Townsend; Farmer Boy; Mr. X Killer X
- Billed height: 6 ft 4 in (1.93 m)
- Billed weight: 252 lb (114 kg)
- Debut: 1956
- Retired: May 1963

Frank Townsend (March 20, 1933 – May 15, 1965), was an American professional wrestler and musician. He was known as Farmer Boy and was dubbed ‘The Singing Wrestler.'

== Professional wrestling career ==
Townsend began his wrestling career in 1956 in Ohio.

During his career he worked in Calgary, Minnesota, New York, Toronto, St. Louis, and Vancouver. Most of his career was spent in Toronto working for Maple Leaf Wrestling from 1957 to 1958, and again in 1961. He teamed with Pat O'Connor and Billy Watson. In 1961 he toured England working for Joint Promotions until 1962. That year he returned to North America working in St. Louis, American Wrestling Association and made his debut in Vancouver as Mr. X. In Vancouver he teamed with Gene Kiniski to win the NWA Canadian Tag Team Championship (Vancouver version) defeating Sandor Kovacs and Dan Miller on February 11, 1963. They dropped the belts to Mitsu Arakawa and Kinji Shibuya a month later.

In May 1963, Townsend went to Japan as Killer X for Japan Wrestling Association. After the tour in Japan, Townsend retired from wrestling and continued his music career.

== Death ==
On May 15, 1965, Townsend and his yacht crew were preparing to race the yacht, the Dorade, in Puget Sound, Washington. During the race, Townsend fell overboard and is believed to have drowned. He was 32 years old at the time of his death. He is buried alongside his mother in Blackwood, NJ. He left behind his wife, Sonia nee Hrynchuk, and toddler son, Frederick Frank.

== Championships and accomplishments ==
- All-Star Wrestling
  - NWA Canadian Tag Team Championship (Vancouver version) (1 time) - with Gene Kiniski
- Minneapolis Boxing and Wrestling Club
  - NWA International Tag Team Championship (Minneapolis version) (2 times) - with Butch Levy

== Discography ==
=== Singles and EPs ===
- 1957: If You Believe / Baby, I've Got A Crush On You
- 1957: If You Fall For Me / Find A Love For Me with the Denny Vaughan Orchestra

== See also ==
- List of premature professional wrestling deaths
