= Wojo the BC Hulk =

Canadian professional wrestler

Personal information
- Born: Adam Yawrenko; 19 October 1957 Vancouver, British Columbia, Canada

Professional wrestling career
- Ring name(s): Wojo the BC Hulk; Goliath; Wojo Yawrenko; Goliath Yawrenko
- Billed height: 6 ft 9 in (206 cm)
- Billed weight: 317 lb (144 kg)
- Trained by: Moose Morowski; Paddy Ryan
- Debut: January 9, 1984
- Retired: 1985

Adam Yawrenko (born October 19, 1957 ) is a retired Canadian professional wrestler who spent his career in Vancouver's NWA All-Star Wrestling in the mid 1980s, best known for his ring name Wojo the BC Hulk.

== Professional wrestling career ==
Originally a basketball player who stood at 6"9 and weighed 317 pounds was trained by Moose Morowski, who was renowned in Vancouver. Yawernko made his wrestling debut on January 9, 1984, when he defeated Peter Flowers and later that night won a battle royal.

Wojo only title reign was when he defeated Al Tomko for NWA Canadian Heavyweight Championship on May 16, 1984 in Abbotsford. He would dropped the title back to Tomko.

In January 1985, Yawrenko went to South Africa (booked through Moose Morowski). One night, live bullets were thrown at him in the ring, one of which he kept as a souvenir. He did not last long in South Africa due to riots. Later worked in Japan and Europe.

He retired after suffering a blood clot in his leg that travelled through the lungs and heart during a match in Vienna, Austria and nearly died in the ring. Yawrenko spent 28 days in a Vienna hospital with tubes stuck in him. For eight months, Yawrenko went to therapy and took blood thinners. He has never had another attack, but has to wear a support sock for the rest of his life.

== Championships and accomplishments ==
- NWA All-Star Wrestling
  - NWA Canadian Heavyweight Championship (Vancouver version) (1 time)
