= Erich Froelich =

Canadian professional wrestler

Personal information
- Born: Udo Froehlich; 3 May 1937 Germany
- Died: 10 February 2023 (aged 85) Vancouver, British Columbia, Canada

Professional wrestling career
- Ring name(s): Erich Froelich; Eric Rommel; Ricky Rommel
- Billed height: 5"11
- Billed weight: 230 lb (104 kg)
- Trained by: Rod Fenton
- Debut: 1960
- Retired: 1982

Udo Froelich (3 May 1937 – 10 February 2023) was a German-Canadian professional wrestler who spent most his career in Vancouver, Canada for NWA All-Star Wrestling and Pacific Northwest Wrestling in Portland, Oregon.

== Professional wrestling career ==
Froelich was born in Germany and emigrated to Canada in 1956 to avoid being drafted by the West German army. He was a gymnast. In 1960, he made his professional wrestling debut in Vancouver after he was trained by Canadian wrestler Rod Fenton. Became a household name for the promotion. In 1966, Froelich made his debut for Pacific Northwest Wrestling and spent many years there.

He wrestled barefoot. Froelich's signature move was the nip up, a move that came about when he was laying flat on his back in the ring and would bring his legs up to his stomach and throw himself forward into a standing position.

During his career, he worked in many countries in England, Puerto Rico, Japan, Fiji, Hawaii and Australia.

On August 12, 1972, Froelich won his first and only singles title when he won NWA "Beat the Champ" Television Championship defeating Kinji Shibuya. He dropped the title to Masa Saito a month later.

In 1977, Froliech teamed with Mr. X and won the NWA Canadian Tag Team Championship (Vancouver version).

Froelich retired from wrestling in 1982 due to open heart and lung surgeries, knee and hip replacements.

== Personal life and death ==
After retiring from wrestling Froelich resided in Vancouver.

On February 10, 2023, Froelich died at the age of 85.

== Championships and accomplishments ==
- NWA All-Star Wrestling
    - NWA Canadian Tag Team Championship (Vancouver version) (1 time) - with Mr. X
- NWA Los Angeles
  - WWA International Television Tag Team Championship (1 time) — with Mighty Igor
  - NWA Americas Tag Team Championship - with Ruben Juarez
- NWA Hollywood Wrestling
  - NWA "Beat the Champ" Television Championship (1 time)
- Western States Sports
  - NWA North American Tag Team Championship (Amarillo version) - with Ricky Romero
  - NWA Western States Tag Team Championship - with Mr. Wrestling
