= Bruiser Costa =

Professional wrestler

Personal information
- Born: Jeffery Costa; June 26, 1962 (age 64) Nashua, New Hampshire, U.S.

Professional wrestling career
- Ring name(s): Bruiser Costa; Lobsterman; Jeff Costa; Tony Costa; Tony DeCosta; Jeff McHale
- Billed weight: 250 lb (110 kg)
- Trained by: Killer Kowalski, Dean Ho
- Debut: August 30, 1980
- Retired: 2019

Jeff Costa (born June 26, 1962), better known by his ring name Bruiser Costa, is an American retired wrestler who worked for NWA All-Star Wrestling in Vancouver during the promotions later days in the 1980s. In the 1990s he worked in the independent promotions in New England as The Lobsterman.

== Professional wrestling career ==
Costa was trained by Killer Kowalski in Salem, Massachusetts. He would make his debut on August 30, 1980 at 18 defeating John Callahan by disqualification at Kowalski's International Wrestling Federation in Sailsbury Beach, Massachusetts. Later that year he went to Montreal to work for Lutte International.

In 1981, he worked for the World Wrestling Federation.

Then in 1982, he worked in Vancouver for NWA All-Star Wrestling where he feuded with his trainer Dean Ho. He won the NWA International Tag Team Championship with Terry Adonis. Costa stayed in Vancouver until 1988 a year before All-Star Wrestling folded.

Costa returned to New England working as The Lobsterman in the early 1990s and wearing lobster claws to the ring. During that time he ran a promotion, All-Star Wrestling in New Hampshire from 1992 to 2006 and trained wrestlers such as Bob Evans, Gino Martino, Johnny Vegas and other wrestlers. Also in the 1990s, 2000s and 2010s, he continued to work in New England until his last match in 2019.

== Championships and accomplishments ==
- NWA All-Star Wrestling
  - NWA Canadian Heavyweight Championship (Vancouver version) (1 time)
  - NWA Canadian Tag Team Championship (Vancouver version) (1 time) - with Spider Web (Drago Zhivago) (1)
  - NWA International Tag Team Championship (Vancouver version) (1 time) - with Terry Adonis (1)

== Discography ==
=== Lobsterman and the Crustaceans ===
- Lobsterman and the Crustaceans (2018)
