= NWA International Tag Team Championship (disambiguation) =

The NWA International Tag Team Championship is a name used by several championships that were or currently are under the National Wrestling Alliance (NWA)'s supervision:

- NWA International Tag Team Championship, established in 1962 by the NWA-affiliated Japan Wrestling Association and continued by All Japan Pro Wrestling (AJPW) from 1973 to 1988 until it was unified with the PWF Tag Team Championship to create the World Tag Team Championship, also known as the "Double Cup".
- NWA International Tag Team Championship (Amarillo version), established in 1959 by the NWA-affiliated Western States Sports and retired in 1975
- NWA International Tag Team Championship (Georgia version), established in 1956 by the NWA-affiliated Georgia Championship Wrestling (GCW) and retired in 1963
- NWA International Tag Team Championship (Minneapolis version), established in 1959 by the NWA-affiliated Minneapolis Boxing and Wrestling Club and unified with the NWA World Tag Team Championship (Minneapolis version) in 1960
- NWA International Tag Team Championship (Toronto version), established in 1961 by the NWA-affiliated Maple Leaf Wrestling (MLW) and retired in 1977
- NWA International Tag Team Championship (Vancouver version), established in 1982 by the NWA-affiliated All-Star Wrestling (ASW) and retired in 1985
- Stampede Wrestling International Tag Team Championship, was known as the NWA International Tag Team Championship under the NWA-affiliated Stampede Wrestling from 1958 until 1984
