= Dean Ho (wrestler) =

American professional wrestler (1940–2021)

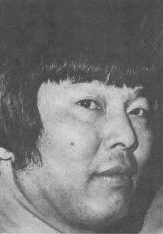

Personal information
- Born: Dean Kiyoshi Higuchi; July 18, 1940 Honolulu, Territory of Hawaii
- Died: February 20, 2021 (aged 80) Kelowna, British Columbia, Canada

Professional wrestling career
- Ring name(s): Dean Ho; Dean Higuchi; Dean Kailani
- Billed height: 6 ft 0 in (183 cm)
- Billed weight: 264 lb (120 kg)
- Trained by: The Destroyer
- Debut: 1962
- Retired: 1983

Dean Kiyoshi Higuchi (July 18, 1940 – February 20, 2021) was an American bodybuilder and professional wrestler, known by his ring name, Dean Ho. He competed in North American promotions including Pacific Northwest Wrestling, the World Wide Wrestling Federation and Big Time Wrestling during the 1960s, 1970s and early 1980s. A longtime veteran of the Vancouver's NWA All-Star Wrestling, he feuded with Terry Adonis, The Brute and former NWA World Heavyweight Champion Gene Kiniski.

== Bodybuilding career ==
After graduating from President Theodore Roosevelt High School, Higuchi was one of Hawaii's prominent bodybuilders during the 1950s winning the title "Mr. Hawaiian Islands" competition in 1956 and finishing in sixth place in the "Mr. America" competition in Philadelphia.

=== Dean's Gym ===
He opened his gym on Kalakaua Avenue in 1957, and it was a popular training center for both bodybuilders and professional wrestlers. Many of the areas top bodybuilders such as Mike Brown and professional wrestlers trained for decades including Don Muraco, Beauregarde, Rene Goulet and Karl Gotch.

== Professional wrestling career ==
=== Early career ===
Making his professional wrestling debut in 1962, he lost one of his earliest matches to Rocky Columbo in Portland, Oregon on April 6, 1962.

During the mid-1960s, Higuchi began competing for promoter Ed Francis's Pacific Northwest Wrestling feuding with El Shereeh and also teaming with Kazimoto and Al Torres during early 1965. Later, while in Francis's Big Time Wrestling, he appeared in televised matches against Fuji Fujiwara, Bill Dromo, Tosh Togo, Nick Kozak, Kongozan and the Mongolian Stomper at the Honolulu Civic Auditorium during 1966.

After losing to Hans Mortier and Johnny Barend in early 1967, Higuchi wrestled two matches in one night defeating Great Fuji although he lost a later tag team match with Karl Gotch against Curtis Iaukea and Ripper Collins on April 5, 1967, before moving to the mainland by the end of the year.

=== National Wrestling Alliance ===
Feuding with then NWA World Heavyweight Champion Gene Kiniski in 1968, he lost two title matches to him on October 21 and again on December 16 in Vancouver, British Columbia, Canada. The following year, he would avenge his loss teaming with Earl Maynard to defeat Kiniski and Bad Boy Shields in a tournament final for the NWA Canadian Tag Team Championship in Vancouver on May 12, 1969.

Continuing his long-running feud with Kiniski, he and Steve Bolus fought to a time limit draw against Kiniski and Angelo Mosca on January 26 and, with Tex McKenzie, defeated Gene Kiniski and Moose Morowski on April 28, 1970.

Losing the title less than a month later to Dutch Savage and "Bulldog" Bob Brown on June 9, he and Steve Bolus defeated them on December 8 and held them until their defeat by Brown and John Quinn on February 9, 1970. He later won the tag team title with Steven Little Bear twice during 1971 and feuded with the Skull Brothers and Gene Kiniski and Bob Brown before losing the title to Kiniski and Brown for the second and final time on October 11, 1971.

Staying in Vancouver in early 1973, he defeated Sailor White on January 22. Feuding with The Brute, he and Sean Reagan lost a tag team match to The Brute and Mike Webster in Seattle on March 3. After defeating Tony Bourne, Butts Giraud and Bob Hames in a 6-man tag-team match with Larry Whistler and Eric Froelich on July 16, he left the promotion moving on to the northeastern United States.

While wrestling in Georgia Championship Wrestling, he held the NWA Georgia Tag Team Championship with Ken Mantell defeating Black Gordman and Goliath on July 2 before losing them to Jimmy and Johnny Valiant a little more than two weeks later on July 16, 1976. He also helped Rick "The Dragon" Steamboat, who was also wrestling in Georgia at the time, develop his martial arts and ring psychology during his early career.

=== World Wide Wrestling Federation ===
Wrestling for the World Wide Wrestling Federation in 1973, he and Tony Garea teamed to defeat Toru Tanaka and Mr. Fuji to win the WWWF World Tag Team Championship on November 14, 1973. Holding on to the title for six months, they eventually lost the belts to Jimmy and Johnny Valiant on May 8, 1974. They continued to team for a time defeating Jack Evans and Hans Schroeder on November 24 however, by summer 1975, they had gone their separate ways. Later that year, Ho left the WWWF.

=== From San Francisco to Vancouver ===
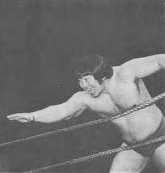
Higuchi, circa 1978

Returning to Vancouver for a time, he and George Wells defeated Dale Lewis and Seigfried Steinke on January 12, 1976 before losing them to his longtime rival Gene Kiniski and Seigfried Steinke on February 9. In 1977, Higuchi began wrestling in the San Francisco-area defeating Alexis Smirnoff for the NWA United States Heavyweight Championship in Daly City, California on July 16 holding the title for two months before losing the title to Bob Roop on September 17.

Higuchi later regained the title, which had been vacated after Roop left the company in December 1977, winning a tournament on January 14, 1978. During early 1978, he also teamed with Pepper Gomez and later Mando Guerrero against his old tag team partner Sir Earl Maynard and later teamed with Gomez and Guerrero in a 6-man tag team match against Texas Red, Great Goliath and Don Muraco. Defending his NWA US Heavyweight title in a no disqualification match against Don Muraco, he lost the title to Muraco on April 1.

After the death of then NWA US Heavyweight Champion Moondog Mayne on August 13, he and "Playboy" Buddy Rose fought to a time limit draw for the vacant title six days later in San Francisco on August 19 (Rose would eventually defeat "Superfly" Jimmy Snuka in a tournament final to win the title the following month on September 16).

=== Return to Vancouver ===
Higuchi later returned to his home territory in All-Star Wrestling and, with Klondike Mike, defeated Al Tomko and Igor Volkoff on November 30, 1981. Feuding with Terry Adonis, he teamed with Moondog Moretti to defeat Adonis and Timothy Flowers in a tag team match on January 24, 1983. He retired later that year.

== Personal life and death ==
In 1990, Higuchi sold his gym and retired to Canada where he ran a deli and was involved as a social worker in Vancouver, British Columbia.

On February 20, 2021, Higuchi died from complications of chronic traumatic encephalopathy at the age of 80. His death was reported by former WWE referee Kevin Jefferies a week later, who believes his death was caused by his early days playing football.

== Championships and accomplishments ==
- Big Time Wrestling (San Francisco)
  - NWA United States Heavyweight Championship (San Francisco version) (2 times)
  - NWA World Tag Team Championship (San Francisco version) (2 times) - with Moondog Mayne (1) and Ron Starr (1)
- Cauliflower Alley Club
  - Men's Wrestling Award (2010)
- Georgia Championship Wrestling
  - NWA Georgia Tag Team Championship (1 time) - with Ken Mantell
- NWA All-Star Wrestling
  - NWA Canadian Tag Team Championship (Vancouver version) (6 times) - with Earl Maynard (1), Steve Bolus (1), Steven Little Bear (2) George Wells (1) and Klondike Mike (1)
  - NWA International Tag Team Championship (Vancouver version) (2 times) - with Sonny Myers (1) and Moondog Moretti (1)
- NWA Big Time Wrestling (Texas)
  - NWA American Tag Team Championship (1 time) - with Fritz Von Erich
- Pacific Northwest Wrestling
  - NWA Pacific Northwest Tag Team Championship (1 time) - with Johnny Kostas
- World Wide Wrestling Federation
  - WWWF World Tag Team Championship (1 time) - with Tony Garea
