= NWA United States Heavyweight Championship (San Francisco version) =

NWA United States Heavyweight Championship (San Francisco)

Details
- Promotion: NWA San Francisco; Big Time Wrestling
- Date established: November 1960
- Date retired: January 1981

Other name(s)
- AWA United States Heavyweight Championship
Statistics
- First champion(s): Ray Stevens
- Most reigns: Ray Stevens (9 reigns)
- Longest reign: Bill Watts (385 days)
- Shortest reign: Dusty Rhodes (promotion closed after Dusty Rhodes wins title)

The NWA San Francisco United States Championship was a version of the NWA United States Heavyweight Championship that was defended in NWA San Francisco and, later, Big Time Wrestling. The title, which originated as the American Wrestling Alliance United States Championship and was renamed in 1968, existed from 1960 until 1981.

== Title history ==
Wrestler:	Times:	Date:	Location:	Notes:
American Wrestling Alliance United States Heavyweight Championship
Ray Stevens	1	November 1960		Awarded
Bob Ellis	1	November 11, 1960	San Francisco, CA	
Ray Stevens	2	May 1961	San Francisco, CA	
Vacated		July 1962		Stevens broke his ankle in cart racing.
Pepper Gomez	1	July 1962	Windsor, ON	defeated Freddie Blassie.
Ray Stevens	3	February 23, 1963	San Francisco, CA	
Wilbur Snyder	1	April 20, 1963	San Francisco, CA	
Ray Stevens	4	June 29, 1963	San Francisco, CA	
Dominic DeNucci	1	January 25, 1964	San Francisco, CA	
Ray Stevens	5	February 29, 1964	San Francisco, CA	
Kinji Shibuya	1	October 25, 1964	Honolulu, HI	
Bobo Brazil	1	October 16, 1965	San Francisco, CA	
Kinji Shibuya	2	November 13, 1965	San Francisco, CA	
Bill Watts	1	February 19, 1966	San Francisco, CA	
Ray Stevens	6	March 11, 1967	San Francisco, CA	
Bearcat Wright	1	December 2, 1967	San Francisco, CA	
Kinji Shibuya	3	February 17, 1968	San Francisco, CA	
Bearcat Wright	2	April 13, 1968	San Francisco, CA	
King Curtis Iaukea	1	July 4, 1968	?	
Ray Stevens	7	September 14, 1968	San Francisco, CA	Promotion rejoins the NWA in 1968 during Stevens' reign.
Renamed NWA United States Heavyweight Championship (San Francisco version)
King Curtis Iaukea	2	May 10, 1969	San Francisco, CA	
Ray Stevens	8	June 7, 1969	San Francisco, CA	
Vacated		August 1969		Stevens broke his leg while racing.
Pat Patterson	1	August 9, 1969	San Francisco, CA	Defeated Pedro Morales to win vacant title.
Ray Stevens	9	July 11, 1970	San Francisco, CA	Lost a match to Patterson in Anchorage, Alaska on September 22, with Patterson announced as the new champion to the local audience. It's unclear whether this result was announced by the promotion to its audience at large as having occurred or having been overturned.
Paul DeMarco	1	June 5, 1971	San Francisco, CA	
Peter Maivia	1	July 31, 1971	San Francisco, CA	
Paul DeMarco	2	September 18, 1971	San Francisco, CA	
Rocky Johnson	1	November 5, 1971	San Francisco, CA	
Pat Patterson	2	February 12, 1972	San Francisco, CA	
Held Up		December 7, 1972		Title held up after match against Great Mephisto
Great Mephisto	1	February 17, 1973		Defeated Patterson after several rematches failed to end with winner.
Pat Patterson	3	April 28, 1973	San Francisco, CA	
Moondog Mayne	1	December 29, 1973	San Francisco, CA	
Peter Maivia	2	October 12, 1974	San Francisco, CA	
The Brute	1	January 15, 1975	San Francisco, CA	
Pat Patterson	4	April 5, 1975	San Francisco, CA	
Angelo Mosca	1	July 7, 1975	San Jose, CA	
Pat Patterson	5	September 7, 1975	Sacramento, CA	
Mr. Fuji	1	February 7, 1976	San Francisco, CA	
Vacated		February 12, 1977		Fuji left the area.
Pat Patterson	6	March 12, 1977	San Francisco, CA	Defeated Alexis Smirnoff in tournament final.
Alexis Smirnoff	1	April 16, 1977	San Francisco, CA	
Dean Ho	1	July 16, 1977	San Francisco, CA	
Bob Roop	1	September 17, 1977	San Francisco, CA	
Vacated		December 1977		Bob Roop fired.
Dean Ho	2	January 14, 1978		Won tournament.
Don Muraco	1	April 1, 1978	San Francisco, CA	
Moondog Mayne	2	May 27, 1978	San Francisco, CA	
Roddy Piper	1	June 24, 1978	San Francisco, CA	
Moondog Mayne	3	July 14, 1978	?	
Vacated		August 13, 1978		Mayne killed in auto accident.
Buddy Rose	1	September 16, 1978	San Francisco, CA	Defeated Dean Ho in tournament final.
Vacated		1979		Rose suspended.
Ron Starr	1	March 3, 1979	San Francisco, CA	Defeated Roddy Piper in tournament final.
Buddy Rose	2	May 11, 1979	San Francisco, CA	
Ron Starr	2	June 8, 1979	San Francisco, CA	Defeated Johnny Mantell when Rose refused to wrestle.
Bob Sweetan	1	October 23, 1979	San Francisco, CA	
George Wells	1	December 29, 1979	San Francisco, CA	
Ed Wiskoski	1	June 7, 1980	San Francisco, CA	
Ron Starr	3	August 9, 1980	San Francisco, CA	
Bob Sweetan	2	October 13, 1980	San Francisco, CA	
Vacated		October 1980		Sweetan left the area.
Dusty Rhodes	1	November 8, 1980	San Francisco, CA	Defeated Dick Slater for the vacant title.
Title Retired		January 1981		Promotion closed; Mid-Atlantic version becomes the undisputed NWA US Championship after this date

== See also ==
- National Wrestling Alliance
