= Vancouver All-Star Wrestling =

Canadian professional wrestling promotion

- Acronym: All-Star
- Founded: 1960
- Defunct: 1989
- Headquarters: Vancouver, British Columbia
- Founder(s): Rod Fenton (as Big Time Wrestling); Gene Kiniski; Sandor Kovacs; Don Owen
- Owner(s): Rod Fenton (until 1968); Sandor Kovac (1968-1977); Gene Kiniski (1968–1983); Al Tomko (1977-1989); Neil Drummond (1989)
- Parent: Northwest Wrestling Promotions
- Formerly: Big Time Wrestling

All Star Wrestling Vancouver, formerly NWA All Star Wrestling and sometimes referred to as NWA Vancouver, was a Canadian professional wrestling promotion, based in Vancouver, British Columbia. All-Star Wrestling folded in 1989.

== History ==
=== Early history ===
Although other wrestling promotions existed in Vancouver prior to the early 1960s (particularly a predecessor of All Star's called Big Time Wrestling), All Star (an affiliate of the National Wrestling Alliance (NWA) for most of its existence) became the longest-lived and perhaps best-remembered of all promotions operating in the Vancouver area before or since. The promotion began coming into its own around the time CHAN-TV began broadcasting their TV program (also called All Star Wrestling) in 1962, when Gene Kiniski arrived in Vancouver and became a regular on the roster. At the time All Star began, the NWA British Empire heavyweight title was the top singles title in the Vancouver territory, while the Pacific Coast tag team title initially served as the tag team championship (both titles were carried over from Big Time Wrestling); however, after the British Empire title was abandoned sometime after 1963 (when Kiniski last won it), All Star had no singles title of its own until 1970, when the Pacific Coast heavyweight title (which was first introduced in 1948 in Big Time Wrestling, but became inactive around 1958) was reactivated.

=== Kiniski/Kovacs era (1968–1977) ===
All Star started becoming a serious force in the Pacific Northwest wrestling scene during Kiniski's reign as NWA World Heavyweight champion (which he won from Lou Thesz in 1966), when he and Sandor Kovacs, along with Portland promoter Don Owen, joined forces to promote the territory at the start of 1968, forming Northwest Wrestling Promotions as the parent company to run All Star. During this time, the promotion shared talent (including many of the sport's big names of the time) with Owen's nearby NWA affiliate Pacific Northwest Wrestling while also developing local talent. At the same time, the All Star Wrestling program began to be seen across Canada via syndication. Ron Morrier was the original host of the TV show and served in that capacity until his death on August 6, 1981; after that, former CFUN disk jockey Ed Karl took over as the host for the remainder of the show's run on CHAN-TV.

=== Al Tomko era (1977–1989) ===
Kovacs promoted his final All Star show on January 17, 1977, before selling his share in the promotion to Al Tomko, a veteran wrestler and former Winnipeg promoter for the AWA. While the promotion managed to hold steady through the late-1970s following the sale, All Star began going into decline by the early-1980s, due partly to the aging Tomko (who was physically past his prime and had poor wrestling skills) pushing himself as the company's top star, and partly to the rise of the WWF around the middle of the decade (a situation which actually affected many other North American promotions besides All Star). Late in the promotion's NWA affiliation, during episodes of All Star Wrestling, Tomko and Ed Karl would also present and commentate on highlight clips of matches from fellow NWA affiliates Central States Wrestling and Jim Crockett Promotions, as well as matches taped at All Star's main house shows in Vancouver and Cloverdale.

Noticing the decline of the promotion, Kiniski sold his ownership stake and got out sometime around 1983, after which he began promoting shows in Vancouver in association with Stampede Wrestling and the AWA. In late 1985, Tomko withdrew All Star from the NWA and created a new sanctioning body for the company called the Universal Wrestling Alliance; those changes did nothing to reverse All Star's fortunes, however, and the promotion would eventually cease operations, holding its final event in Elk Grove, British Columbia on July 2, 1989. Mauro Ranallo, who went on to become a radio announcer for Abbotsford station CFVR (now CKQC-FM) and the English-language play-by-play commentator for Pride Fighting Championships, Stampede Wrestling, King of the Cage, KVOS-TV's NWA Top Ranked Wrestling, and most recently WWE Smackdown and Maple Leaf Pro Wrestling, got his start as an on-camera personality with All Star Wrestling while still in his teens, late in the show's run.

== Alumni ==
- Delta Dawn
- Abdullah the Butcher
- Al Tomko
- André the Giant
- The Assassins
- The "Atomic Kid" Buddy Wayne
- Bobby Bass
- Kevin Jefferies
- "Bulldog" Bob Brown
- The Brute (Bugsy McGraw)
- Buzz Grogan
- Buzz Tyler
- Genie
- Wendy Reicher
- JJ Jetson
- Crusher von Haig (Road Warrior Hawk)
- Dale Lewis
- Dean Ho
- The Idols
- "Diamond" Timothy Flowers
- Don Jardine
- Don Leo Jonathan
- "Gentleman" Jonathan Sayers
- Don Morrow (Don Muraco)
- Dominic DeNucci
- Dutch Savage
- Rocky Della Serra
- "Dirty" Dan Denton
- Bruiser Costa
- "Blackjack" Hoss Taylor
- Sonny Myers
- Dennis Stamp
- Terry "The Ripper" Rivera
- David Schultz
- Eddie Morrow
- Mike Allen
- "Wildthing" Steve Ray
- Erich Froelich
- Mike Roselli
- The A-team
- The Blue Angel
- The Fabulous Kangaroos
- Flash Gordon
- The Frog (Terry Tomko)
- Athol Foley
- J.R. Foley
- The Flying Peacock
- Gama Singh
- Gerry Morrow
- Gidget
- Gene Kiniski
- "Gorgeous" Michelle Starr
- Hard Boiled Haggerty
- Haystacks Calhoun
- The Honky Tonk Man
- The Iron Sheik
- Jake Roberts
- Jay Youngblood
- Dr. Jerry Graham
- Corey Collins
- John Quinn
- Billy Two Eagles
- Big John Tenta
- Mike Palace
- The Great Dave Scott
- Suzie Tanner
- Lazer Jack Smith
- Jimmy Snuka
- John Tolos
- Kinji Shibuya
- King Kong JR Bundy
- Killer Kowalski
- Joe Martin
- Bobby Jones
- Mad Dog Moretti
- Klondike Mike
- Mark Lewin
- Doug McCoil
- Igor Volkoff
- Stacy Carter
- The Iron Maiden
- The Mighty I-Ton
- Mike Sharpe
- Mike Edwards
- Mike Webster
- Masa Saito
- Moondog Mayne
- Moose Morowski
- Neil Drummond/The Wizard
- Todd "Ole" Olsen/Thor/Thor "The Body" Olsen
- Mauro Ranallo
- "Playboy" Buddy Rose
- Rick Davis (Todd Tomko)
- Rick Martel
- Rick Patterson
- Ron Starr
- Harley the Nightrider
- Ricky Hunter
- Rick Rude
- Denuda The Polish Princess
- Chris "The Kid" Nevada
- Ivan Gorky
- Greg Lake
- Dale Housten
- Mad Dog Rex
- Chris Colt
- Terry Adonis
- American Ninja
- Avalanche Tyler
- Randy Taylor
- Rip Oliver
- Ed Karl
- Joe Cagle
- The Robotrons (Craig Bresett and Fabio Chiesa)
- Rocky Johnson
- Roddy Piper
- Salvatore Martino
- The Samoans
- Scotty the Body
- Sean Regan
- Siegfried Steinke
- The BC Blondes
- The Sheepherders
- Snake Williams
- Stan Stasiak
- Steven Little Bear
- Tiger Jeet Singh
- Tony Borne
- "Vicious" Verne Siebert
- "Tiger" Dory Signh
- Whipper Billy Watson
- Mr. X (Guy Mitchell)
- Wojo the BC Hulk
- Shalimar
- Grandmaster Singh

.

Steve E Ocean

== Championships ==
=== NWA-sanctioned championships ===
Championship:	Last Champion(s):	Active From:	Active Till:	Notes:
NWA British Empire Heavyweight Championship	Gene Kiniski	July 1959	1963	Title was promoted by All-Star Wrestling’s predecessor Big Time Wrestling
NWA World Tag Team Championship (Vancouver Version)	The Assassins	June, 1966	1967	
NWA Pacific Coast Heavyweight Championship	Jay Youngblood	February 9, 1970	March, 1981	The Pacific Coast Championship was also promoted by Big Time Wrestling between 1948 and 1958
NWA Pacific Coast Tag Team Championship	Gene Kiniski and Hard Boiled Haggerty	1961	November, 1962	Title was promoted by All-Star Wrestling’s predecessor Big Time Wrestling
NWA Canadian Heavyweight Championship (Vancouver version)	Dan Denton	May, 1982	1989	Renamed the UWA Canadian Heavyweight Championship when All-Star withdrew from the National Wrestling Alliance in 1985
NWA Canadian Tag Team Championship (Vancouver version)	Rick Davis and Rocky Dellasera	1962	1986	
NWA International Tag Team Championship (Vancouver version)	Sonny Myers and Super Destroyer	1981	1985	Title abandoned when All-Star withdrew from the NWA in 1985

=== UWA-sanctioned championships ===
Championship:	Last Champion(s):	Active From:	Active Till:	Notes:
UWA Heavyweight Championship	Sweet Daddy Sampson	1986	1989	
UWA Tag Team Championship	Robotron and the Olympian	1986	1988	
UWA Junior Heavyweight Championship	The Frog	1987	1989	
UWA Women's Championship	Cory Collins	1984	1989	
UWA International Heavyweight Championship	Timothy Flowers	1988	1988	
UWA Canadian Junior Heavyweight Championship (Vancouver version)	Todd Tomko (Rick Davis)	1985	1989	

== See also ==
- List of National Wrestling Alliance territories
- List of independent wrestling promotions in Canada
