= Rocky Della Serra =

Canadian professional wrestler (born 1958)

Personal information
- Born: Gerry Dellaserra; October 6, 1958 (age 67) Montreal, Quebec, Canada

Professional wrestling career
- Ring name(s): Rocky Della Serra; Gino Della Serra; UFO #2; Tackle
- Billed height: 5 ft 10 in (1.78 m)
- Billed weight: 231 lb (105 kg)
- Debut: 1978
- Retired: 2010

Gerry Dellaserra (born October 6, 1958) is a retired Canadian professional wrestler. He is best known by his ring name Rocky Della Serra who spent his career in Montreal, Vancouver, Memphis, Germany, Japan, Puerto Rico and Portland (Oregon).

== Professional wrestling career ==
Della Serra grew up in Montreal playing football and amateur wrestling, where he won silver in Quebec in 1974. He made his professional wrestling debut in 1978 in Montreal. That summer he also worked in Germany and later Toronto.

In the spring of 1979, Della Serra debuted in Vancouver for NWA All-Star Wrestling. He also worked in Calgary, and Portland from 1980 to 1981.

In 1982, Della Serra worked in Puerto Rico with Pierre Martel winning the WWC World Tag Team Championship where they defeated The Moondogs.

In 1984, he debuted for Montreal's Lutte Internationale where he became a household name and teamed with his brother Bob Della Serra. That same year, he worked in Japan for Universal Wrestling Federation (Japan) with his brother.

In 1987, Lutte Internationale folded and Rocky stayed in All Star Wrestling in Vancouver. In 1989, All-Star Wrestling folded in Vancouver and Rocky returned to Montreal working in independent promotions until 1991. During the rest of his career in the 1990s and 2000s Rocky returned to Vancouver and worked in independent promotions in British Columbia, including Elite Canadian Championship Wrestling. He retired from wrestling in 2010.

== Personnel life ==
Della Serra is the brother of Bob Della Serra. He resides in British Columbia.

== Championships and accomplishments ==
- Pacific Coast Championship Wrestling
  - PCCW Heavyweight Championship (1 time)
- Pro Wrestling Illustrated
  - PWI ranked him # 286 of the 500 best singles wrestlers of the PWI 500 in 1994
- Universal Wrestling Alliance
  - UWA Tag Team Championship (1 time) – with Rick Davis
- West Coast Championship Wrestling
  - WCCW Heavyweight Championship (2 times)
  - WCCW International Tag Team Championship (2 times) – with Ole Olson and Michelle Starr
- World Wrestling Council
  - WWC World Tag Team Championship (1 time) – with Pierre Martel (1)
