= Solomon Grundy (wrestler) =

American professional wrestler (1961–2025)

Personal information
- Born: August 10, 1961 San Antonio, Texas, U.S. or Kentucky, US
- Died: December 14, 2025 (aged 64)

Professional wrestling career
- Ring name(s): Solomon Grundy; Santa Grundy; Jukon Solomon
- Billed height: 6 ft 2 in (188 cm)
- Billed weight: 464 lb (210 kg)
- Trained by: Tom Jones
- Debut: 1978 or 1987
- Retired: 1999

Tim Hagood (August 12, 1961 – December 14, 2025), better known under the ring name Solomon Grundy, was an American professional wrestler. He was best known for his time in World Class Championship Wrestling, however, he also made appearances in Mexico and Puerto Rico.

== Professional wrestling career ==
Hagood made his debut in 1987, initially with World Class Championship Wrestling, where he quickly established himself as one of WCCW's most popular "fan favorites". During his rookie year, Grundy was featured in The Wrestler's monthly "Introducing..." column.

He also wrestled in Mexico making appearances for Asistencia Asesoria y Administracion (AAA) and Consejo Mundial de Lucha Libre (CMLL) in Mexico. On September 21, 1990, he wrestled at the EMLL 57th Anniversary Show. In 1992, he teamed with Mike Shaw, with Shaw using the ring name Aaron Grundy, his kayfabe brother.

== Death ==
Grundy died on December 14, 2025, at the age of 64 from a heart attack.

== Championships and accomplishments ==
- Texas Wrestling Alliance
  - TWA Tag Team Championship (1 time) – with Tugboat Taylor
- Pro Wrestling Illustrated
  - PWI ranked him # 421 of the 500 best singles wrestlers of the PWI 500 in 1991
  - PWI ranked him # 433 of the 500 best singles wrestlers of the PWI 500 in 1992
