= Moose Morowski =

Canadian professional wrestler (1935–2016)

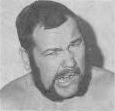

Personal information
- Born: Stan Mykietovitch; 6 July 1935 Winnipeg, Manitoba, Canada
- Died: 10 September 2016 (aged 81) Vancouver, British Columbia, Canada

Professional wrestling career
- Ring name(s): Moose Morowski; Stan Mykietovitch; Stan the Moose; Mike Monroe; The Black Avenger; The Avenger; Dr. Death
- Billed height: 6 ft 5 in (196 cm)
- Billed weight: 276 lb (125 kg)
- Debut: 1952
- Retired: December 3, 1994

Stanley Mykietovitch (6 July 1935 – 10 September 2016) was a Canadian professional wrestler who spent his career in Western Canada, Winnipeg, Minnesota, Australia and Japan, best known for his ring name Moose Morowski.

== Professional wrestling career ==
Morowski started out as a wrestler in his hometown of Winnipeg in 1952 with the Madison Wrestling Club. In 1965, he made his debut in the United States for American Wrestling Association (AWA) in Minnesota. AWA also hosted shows in Winnipeg. He worked for the promotion for many years until 1985.

In 1969, he made his debut in Japan as Stan the Moose working for International Wrestling Enterprise, later became Dr. Death In 1970, he wrestled against Rusher Kimura the promotion's first ever steel cage match. He later joined All Japan Pro Wrestling from 1972 to 1981.

In 1971, he worked for the World Wide Wrestling Federation in New York as Mike Monroe.

During his career he worked in many countries in Puerto Rico, Trinidad and Tobago, Antigua, Australia, New Zealand, Japan, South Africa, Rhodesia, and Germany.

From 1972 to 1973 he worked in Western States Sports in Amarillo, Texas winning the NWA Western States Tag Team Championship three times with Ricky Romero and Nick Kozak.

In August 1975, Moose Morowski won the NWA Austra-Asian Heavyweight Championship defeating George Gouliovas in Australia. A month later, he dropped the title to Skandor Akbar.

He made his debut in Vancouver for NWA All-Star Wrestling in 1977 as the Black Avenger. Morowski won the NWA Canadian Heavyweight Championship (Vancouver version) on November 15, 1982 when he defeated Mr. Pro. He was well-known in the promotion until he retired from wrestling in 1988.

When the WWF came to Vancouver or Seattle he jobbed for them from 1985 to 1988.

He came out of retirement in 1992 in local British Columbia promotions. His last match was on December 3, 1994 teaming with Rocky Della Serra losing to Atomic Punk and the Bodyguard.

== Personal life and death ==
In 2004, Morowski had back surgery which caused an infection that went up his spine. He was then paralyzed and needed to use a wheelchair.

On September 10, 2016, Morowski died, aged 81.

== Championships and accomplishments ==
- Cauliflower Alley Club
  - Other honoree (2003)
- Madison Wrestling Club
  - MWC Heavyweight Championship (2 times)
  - MWC Tag Team Championship (6 times)– with Al Tomko (1), John DePaulo (2), Ted Stefanyk (3)
- NWA All-Star Wrestling
  - NWA Canadian Heavyweight Championship (Vancouver version)
  - NWA International Tag Team Championship (Vancouver version) – with Al Tomko
  - NWA Canadian Tag Team Championship (Vancouver version) (3 time) - with Iron Mike Sharpe (1), Bobby Bass (1) and Don Wayt (1)
- Western States Sports
  - NWA Western States Tag Team Championship (6 times) – with Ricky Romero (2) and Nick Kozak (1)
- World Championship Wrestling
  - NWA Austra-Asian Heavyweight Championship (1 time)
