= Buddy Wayne =

American professional wrestler (1967–2017)

- Wayne c. 2003

Personal information
- Born: Steve Finley; May 27, 1967 Everett, Washington, U.S.
- Died: June 17, 2017 (aged 50) Everett, Washington, U.S.
- Spouse: Shayna Edwards (m. 1985)
- Children: Nick Wayne (son)
- Family: Ed Moretti (father-in-law)

Professional wrestling career
- Ring name(s): Atomic Kid; Buddy Wayne; Canadian Cobra; Steve Finley; Wayne Gillis
- Billed height: 5 ft 6 in (168 cm)
- Billed weight: 180 lb (82 kg)
- Trained by: Buddy Rose; Ole Olson
- Debut: 1985

Steve Finley (May 27, 1967 – June 17, 2017), better known by his ring name Buddy Wayne, was an American professional wrestler. He is the father of Nick Wayne.

== Professional wrestling career ==
Finley was trained by Buddy Rose and Ole Olson in Portland, Oregon. He began his wrestling career in 1985 with NWA All-Star Wrestling based in Vancouver, Canada. At one point in the 1980s, he wrestled around the Canadian Maritimes in Grand Prix Wrestling for promoter Emile Duprée using the ring name Wayne Gillis. He also worked under the names the Atomic Kid in the U.S. and Canada and King Cobra while wrestling in Mexico, among others. He spent most of his career in the Pacific Northwest, with stints in smaller promotions such as Championship Wrestling USA where he held the championship. From the 1990s through 2003, he worked a number of enhancement matches in the World Wrestling Federation (WWF, now WWE) and World Championship Wrestling (WCW) against wrestlers such as Ted DiBiase, Bam Bam Bigelow, Edge, Scott Hall, Ricky Steamboat, Diamond Dallas Page, and Shawn Michaels. He had matches featured on WWE Velocity and WWE Heat, including defeats against Tajiri, Mark Jindrak, and Garrison Cade.

Wayne had a history of heart problems and underwent two open-heart surgeries. He returned to the ring in 2013 and often performed alongside his trainees on the independent circuit. Because of this, he never officially retired from in-ring performing. He became a staple in Pacific Northwest Wrestling and one of the most well-known wrestlers in the region.

=== Legacy ===
After his son Nick signed for All Elite Wrestling (AEW) in 2023, Wayne's death became a central topic of a storyline involving Nick, Wayne's student Darby Allin, Christian Cage, Luchasaurus, and his wife Shayna, with Cage disparaging Wayne's wrestling career while claiming to be Nick's new "father figure."

== Training career ==
Finley ran the Buddy Wayne School of Wrestling in his hometown of Everett, Washington. He claimed that he loved training other wrestlers even more than performing. His wife Shayna, who is a member of the Giovannetti family and the daughter of Moondog Ed Moretti, continued to run the school after her husband's death. Finley's students included Bryan Alvarez, future All Elite Wrestling (AEW) talent Darby Allin and Kevin Knight, who would later wrestle for New Japan Pro-Wrestling (NJPW) and Total Nonstop Action Wrestling (TNA).

== Personal life and death ==
Finley was married to Shayna Edwards from 1985 until his death in 2017. They have one son, Nick, who is signed to All Elite Wrestling (AEW) and performs under the ring name Nick Wayne.

Finley is often confused with another wrestler using the ring name of Buddy Wayne. That wrestler, who faced the likes of Jerry Lawler, was active in the 1960s to 1980s and was famous in the Memphis territory.

=== Death ===
Finley died at his wrestling school from a heart attack at age 50 on June 15, 2017.

== Championships and accomplishments ==
- Championship Wrestling USA
  - CW USA Television Championship (5 times)
- International Championship Wrestling
  - ICW Heavyweight Championship (1 time)
  - ICW Tag Team Championship (7 times) - with Thunder Warrior, Sumito (2), Ed Moretti, Ken Johnson, and Ritchie Magnett (2)
- Memphis Wrestling Hall of Fame
  - Class of 2022
- Pro Wrestling Illustrated
  - PWI ranked him # 213 of the 500 best singles wrestlers of the PWI 500 in 1993
  - PWI ranked him # 394 of the 500 best singles wrestlers of the PWI 500 in 1994
- Universal Independent Wrestling
  - UIW Heavyweight Championship (3 times)
- Universal Wrestling Alliance
  - UWA Tag Team Championship (1 time) - with The Frog
