= Mike Shaw =

American wrestler (1957–2010)

Personal information
- Born: Michael Paul Shaw; May 9, 1957 Skandia, Michigan, U.S.
- Died: September 11, 2010 (aged 53) Marquette, Michigan, U.S.
- Cause of death: Pulmonary embolism
- Spouse: Kelly Shaw
- Children: 2

Professional wrestling career
- Ring name(s): Aaron Grundy; Big Ben Sharpe; Bastion Booger; Cousin Mike; Friar Ferguson; Jed Grundy; Klondike Mike; Makhan Singh; Man Mountain Mike; Mike Striker; Norman the Lunatic; Norman the Maniac; Trucker Norm; William Danger; Mike The Danger
- Billed height: 6 ft 1 in (185 cm)
- Billed weight: 401 lb (182 kg)
- Trained by: Killer Kowalski
- Debut: 1980
- Retired: 2006

Michael Paul Shaw (May 9, 1957 – September 11, 2010) was an American professional wrestler who was best known for his stint in World Championship Wrestling (WCW) as Norman the Lunatic, and as Bastion Booger in the World Wrestling Federation (WWF, now WWE).

== Professional wrestling career ==
=== Canadian territories (1980–1989) ===
Mike Shaw started wrestling in 1980 in Vancouver's NWA All-Star Wrestling using the ring name Klondike Mike. In 1981, he wrestled in the WWF as Mike Smith, in a losing effort against former world champion Pedro Morales on All Star Wrestling. In 1982, Shaw began wrestling under his real name for Stu Hart's Stampede Wrestling in Calgary, Alberta. In 1984, he worked for All Japan and Montreal. A year later he worked in the Maritimes.

In 1984, Shaw connected with wrestler Gama Singh and was bestowed the ring name of Makhan Singh, forming the stable "Karachi Vice" with Gama Singh and Gary Albright as Vokhan Singh and managed by Judah Rosenbloom and following the rebirth of Stampede Wrestling in 1985, by Abu Wizal and feuded with the likes of Owen Hart, Davey Boy Smith, Bret Hart, and Chris Benoit.

From 1986 to 1988 he won the Stampede Wrestling North American Heavyweight Championship three times defeating Owen Hart and losing the title back to Hart. He dropped the title the final time to Don Muraco on December 9, 1988. On December 30, 1988, he and Vokhan Singh defeated The British Bulldogs for the Stampede Wrestling International Tag Team Championship. They dropped the titles to Chris Benoit and Biff Wellington on April 8, 1989. After the loss Shaw left Calgary.

=== World Championship Wrestling (1989–1991) ===
Stampede Wrestling closed in December 1989. Just prior to the closure, he received the opportunity to join World Championship Wrestling as Norman the Lunatic. According to Jim Ross, who was at the time a lead commentator for WCW, he was the one who contacted Stampede Wrestling head Stu Hart and recommended for Shaw to join WCW.

He was managed by Theodore Long, who led him around with a giant key. This key was symbolic of Long's potential to recommit Norman to the insane asylum he came from if he did not follow orders. Norman carried a teddy bear with him.

Norman eventually broke away from Long, and turned face (being renamed Norman the Maniac). He feuded with Kevin Sullivan, and even received title shots against NWA World champion Ric Flair.

Shaw later adopted a trucker gimmick as Trucker Norm, ostensibly in memory of his late father, a long-haul truck driver. Shaw then wrestled in Memphis' USWA as Jed Grundy.

=== Global Wrestling Federation (1991) ===
In 1991, Shaw wrestled in the Global Wrestling Federation under his "Makhan Singh" gimmick, where he joined The Cartel with Cactus Jack, Rip Rogers, and Scott Anthony.

=== Mexico (1991–1992) ===
Shaw wrestled in Mexico in the early 90s as Aaron Grundy, the supposed brother of Solomon Grundy, in EMLL and on the Mexican independent scene. Solomon Grundy was an established wrestler in the promotion and in Mexico.

=== World Wrestling Federation (1993–1994) ===
In April 1993, Shaw briefly wrestled for the World Wrestling Federation (WWF) as (alternately) The Friar and Friar Ferguson, a "mad monk". The WWF received negative feedback from the Catholic Church of New York, so they dropped the character.

In June 1993, Shaw was, allegedly as punishment for his weight, given the ring name Bastion Booger, with the gimmick of an unkempt, slovenly and gluttonous man who wrestled in dingy, too-small, gray/beige singlets tailored to give him the appearance of a hunchback. Shaw's debut as Bastion Booger saw him lose to Virgil on the June 19, 1993, edition of Superstars, though he won a rematch the following week.

Booger achieved only marginal success, primarily serving as a jobber to the stars. Booger's biggest victory in the WWF was a clean pinfall over Owen Hart. Booger's only WWF pay-per-view appearance was at the 1993 Survivor Series, teaming with Bam Bam Bigelow and The Headshrinkers in a loss to Men on a Mission and The Bushwhackers. He feuded with Bam Bam Bigelow after "falling in love" with Bigelow's valet, Luna Vachon. While teaming with Bigelow on the January 3, 1994, episode of Monday Night Raw, Booger kissed Vachon, causing Bigelow to get angry.

Booger and Bigelow faced each other the following week, and Bigelow won the match after Vachon distracted Booger by blowing him kisses. Booger was scheduled to appear in the 1994 Royal Rumble match, but was unable to compete, and the on-screen explanation given was that he contracted food poisoning. He lost his final match on WWF TV to Koko B. Ware in April 1994 and he left the WWF in August 1994.

=== Independent circuit (1994–1999) ===
After leaving WWF, Shaw kept the Bastion Booger gimmick. He wrestled in the independent circuit in Michigan and Canada for Border City Wrestling. He feuded with Typhoon in 1995 in indy American promotions losing all the matches to Typhoon. On December 15, 1995, he returned to Calgary as Makhan Singh defeating the Gothic Warrior at the Stu Hart 50th Anniversary Show.

On May 4, 1997, he lost to Doink the Clown at Outaia Pro Wrestling in Arnprior, Ontario. Later that summer, he worked for Renegade Wrestling Alliance based in Hamilton, also worked in Burlington and Oakville, Ontario. Shaw retired from wrestling in 1999.

=== Return to independent circuit (2006) ===
Shaw worked for various independent promotions in 2006 during his final years while operating a wrestling school in his hometown of Skandia, Michigan.

=== Return to WWE (2007) ===
On December 10, 2007, during the WWE Raw 15th anniversary special, he returned as Bastion Booger in the opening segment, in which Triple H jokingly suggested that Big Dick Johnson, another character whose unsightly physical appearance had been used by WWE for comic effect, was Booger's son. Jakks Pacific added Bastion Booger to the Classic Superstars line, series 25 in 2009.

== Personal life and death ==
Shaw was married and had two children.

Shaw died of a pulmonary embolism on September 11, 2010. He was 53 years old. He was survived by his wife Kelly and their two children, son Joshua and daughter Amanda.

== Championships and accomplishments ==
- Continental Wrestling Association
  - CWA Tag Team Championship (1 time) - with Scott Steiner
- NWA All-Star Wrestling
  - NWA Canadian Tag Team Championship (Vancouver version) (2 times) – with Danny O (1) and Dean Ho (1)
- Pro Wrestling Illustrated
  - Ranked No. 403 of the 500 best singles wrestlers during the "PWI Years" in 2003
- Stampede Wrestling
  - Stampede International Tag Team Championship (2 times) – with Vulkan Singh (1) and Jerry Morrow (1)
  - Stampede North American Heavyweight Championship (3 times)
- World Wrestling Federation
  - Slammy Award (1 time)
    - Most Likely To See Jenny Craig (1994)
- Wrestling Observer Newsletter
  - Most Embarrassing Wrestler (1993)
  - Worst Worked Match of the Year (1993) with Bam Bam Bigelow and The Headshrinkers vs. The Bushwhackers and Men on a Mission at Survivor Series
