= UWA Heavyweight Championship (Vancouver version) =

Professional wrestling championship

The Vancouver version of the UWA Heavyweight Championship was the top singles title in All Star Wrestling from its establishment sometime after All Star disaffiliated from the National Wrestling Alliance in late-1985 until the promotion closed in 1989.

== Title history ==
Key
No.	Overall reign number
Reign	Reign number for the specific team—reign numbers for the individuals are in parentheses, if different
Days	Number of days held

No.	Champion	Championship change			Reign statistics		Notes	Ref.
No.	Champion	Date	Event	Location	Reign	Days	Notes	Ref.
1	Al Tomko	N/A	N/A	N/A	1	N/A	Title awarded	
2	Mike Stone	1986	N/A	Cloverdale, BC	1	N/A		
3	Joe Cagle	1986	N/A	British Columbia	1	N/A		
4	Rick Davis	November 1, 1986	N/A	Cloverdale, BC	1	N/A		
5	J.R. Bundy	December 2, 1986	N/A	Burnaby, BC	1	N/A		
6	Billy Two Eagles	1986	N/A	British Columbia	1	N/A		
7	Timothy Flowers	April 3, 1987	N/A	Vancouver, BC	1	N/A		
8	John Tenta	September 1987	N/A	British Columbia	1	N/A		
—	Vacated	1987	—	—	—	—	Championship vacated for undocumented reasons	
9	Richie Magnet	January 2, 1988	N/A	Cloverdale, BC	1	N/A		
10	John Tenta	1988	N/A	British Columbia	2	N/A		
11	Sweet Daddy Sampson	November 8, 1988	N/A	Burnaby, BC	1	N/A		
—	Deactivated	July 1989	—	—	—	—	Promotion closed (Title may have been abandoned before then)	

== See also ==
- Professional wrestling in Canada
