= Moondog Moretti =

American professional wrestler

Ed Moretti
Personal information
- Born: Edward David Giovannetti; November 17, 1957 (age 68) Clearlake, California, U.S.
- Family: Buddy Wayne (son-in-law); Nick Wayne (grandson); Shayna Wayne (daughter)

Professional wrestling career
- Ring name(s): Moondog Moretti; Ed Moretti; Mad Dog Moretti; Lenny Montana; Masked Crippler
- Billed height: 5 ft 10 in (178 cm)
- Billed weight: 319 lb (145 kg)
- Debut: 1978
- Retired: 2010

Edward David Giovannetti (born November 17, 1957), better known by his ring name Ed Moretti or Moondog Moretti, is an American former professional wrestler who competed in the Pacific Coast between the late 1970s and 1990s for Pacific Northwest Wrestling in Portland, Oregon, All Pro Wrestling in San Francisco, and NWA All-Star Wrestling in Vancouver.

== Professional wrestling career ==
Moretti began his wrestling career in 1978 in Portland, Oregon for Pacific Northwest Wrestling. Later that year, he debuted in Vancouver for NWA All-Star Wrestling as Moondog Moretti. In 1979, Moretti made his first tour in Japan. During his time in Portland and Vancouver, Moretti worked in New Brunswick, All Japan Pro Wrestling and Kansas City.

In 1984, Moretti won the NWA Canadian Heavyweight Championship defeating Al Tomko in February 1984 in Vancouver. He dropped the title back to Tomko in April of that year.

When All-Star Wrestling folded in 1987, Moretti began working full-time for Pacific Northwest until the company went bankrupt in July 1992.

From 1990 to 1993, Moretti worked for the World Wrestling Federation as a jobber when the WWF came to California, Pacific Northwest, and Western Canada. He would lose to Bret Hart, Jim Duggan, Kerry Von Erich, Ricky Steamboat, Davey Boy Smith and Kamala. He appeared once in 1996, in a tag match against the Godwinns.

In 1995, Moretti made his debut for All Pro Wrestling in San Francisco. He was awarded the APW Universal Heavyweight Championship in 2000 but later that night dropped it to Donovan Morgan.

He wrestled his last match on July 10, 2010 at All Pro Wrestling losing to Mr. Wrestling IV in Santa Rosa, California.

== Personal life ==
Moretti's daughter, Shayna married wrestler Buddy Wayne. Shayna and Wayne have a son, Nick Wayne, who is also a wrestler. Buddy Wayne died at the age of 50 on June 17, 2017, from a heart attack. Nick is signed to All Elite Wrestling.

== Championships and accomplishments ==
- All Pro Wrestling
  - APW Universal Heavyweight Championship (1 time)
- Central States Wrestling
  - NWA Central States Tag Team Championship (1 time) - with Bobby Jaggers (1)
- Pacific Northwest Wrestling
  - NWA Pacific Northwest Tag Team Championship (1 time) - with Mike Miller (1)
- NWA All-Star Wrestling
  - NWA Canadian Heavyweight Championship (Vancouver version)
  - NWA Canadian Tag Team Championship (Vancouver version) (2 times) - with Terry Adonis (1) and Star Rider (1)
  - NWA International Tag Team Championship (Vancouver version) (1 time) - with Dean Ho (1)
- West Coast Championship Wrestling
  - WCCW Heavyweight Championship (2 times)
- New Brand Wrestling
  - New Brand Television Championship (1 time)
- Western States Alliance
  - WSA Tag Team Championship (1 time) - with Ron Starr
