= NWA Canadian Heavyweight Championship (Vancouver version) =

Professional wrestling championship

The NWA Vancouver Canadian Heavyweight Championship was the Vancouver, British Columbia version of the NWA Canadian Heavyweight title. It was the top singles title in Vancouver-based NWA All-Star Wrestling from 1982 until 1985, when the promotion withdrew from the NWA; the title was then renamed the UWA Canadian Heavyweight Championship (for its fictitious sanctioning body, the Universal Wrestling Alliance) and served as a secondary singles title until 1989.

== Title history ==
Key
| No. | Overall reign number |
| Reign | Reign number for the specific champion |
| Days | Number of days held |

| No. | Champion | Championship change | | | Reign statistics | | Notes | Ref. |
| No. | Champion | Date | Event | Location | Reign | Days | Notes | Ref. |
|---|---|---|---|---|---|---|---|---|
NWA Vancouver Canadian Heavyweight Championship
| 1 | Silvano Sousa | May 1982 | NWA All-Star show | British Columbia | 1 | N/A | Claims to have beaten Angelo Mosca for the Championship | |
| 2 | Al Tomko | May 31, 1982 | NWA All-Star show | Vancouver, BC | 1 | 112 | | |
| 3 | Mr. Pro | September 20, 1982 | NWA All-Star show | Vancouver, BC | 1 | 56 | | |
| 4 | Moose Morowski | November 15, 1982 | NWA All-Star show | Vancouver, BC | 1 | 126 | | |
| 5 | Igor Volkoff | March 21, 1983 | NWA All-Star show | Vancouver, BC | 1 | N/A | | |
| 6 | Al Tomko | May 1983 | NWA All-Star show | British Columbia | 2 | N/A | Awarded title after Volkoff is injured on May 2, 1983; Snake Williams defeats Tomko on December 17, 1983 in Cloverdale, BC, but the title is returned due to outside interference | |
| 7 | Moondog Moretti | February 20, 1984 | NWA All-Star show | British Columbia | 1 | 56 | | |
| 8 | Al Tomko | April 16, 1984 | NWA All-Star show | Vancouver, BC | 3 | 30 | | |
| 9 | Wojo Yawrenko | May 16, 1984 | NWA All-Star show | Abbotsford, BC | 1 | N/A | | |
| 10 | Al Tomko | 1984 | NWA All-Star show | British Columbia | 4 | N/A | Awarded title when Yawrenko left the promotion | |
| 11 | Sonny Myers | December 1, 1984 | NWA All-Star show | Cloverdale, BC | 1 | N/A | | |
| — | Vacated | January 1985 | — | — | — | — | Declared vacant after a match against Al Tomko | |
| 12 | Elton Stanton | January 19, 1985 | NWA All-Star show | Cloverdale, BC | 1 | N/A | Defeated Butch Moffat in tournament final; Gerry Morrow defeats Stanton around May 1985, but the title is returned because Morrow is not the scheduled opponent | |
| — | Vacated | July 1985 | — | — | — | — | Stanton was suspended | |
UWA Canadian Heavyweight Championship
| 13 | Al Tomko | October 10, 1985 | NWA All-Star show | Cloverdale, BC | 5 | 161 | Defeated Moose Morowski | |
| 14 | Mike Stone | March 20, 1986 | NWA All-Star show | Victoria, BC | 1 | 44 | | |
| 15 | Al Tomko | May 3, 1986 | NWA All-Star show | Cloverdale, BC | 6 | N/A | | |
| — | Vacated | 1986 | — | — | — | — | Championship vacated for undocumented reasons | |
| 16 | Joe Cagle | September 6, 1986 | NWA All-Star show | Cloverdale, BC | 1 | 56 | Defeated Pat Brady | |
| 17 | Rick Davis | November 1, 1986 | NWA All-Star show | Cloverdale, BC | 1 | 31 | | |
| 18 | J.R. Bundy | December 2, 1986 | All Star Wrestling (Note: All Star Wrestling was a television program for ASW that began airing on local BCTV television markets in the early 1960s.) | Burnaby, BC | 1 | 70 | This title change aired on tape delay | |
| 19 | Billy Two Eagles | February 10, 1987 | All Star Wrestling | Burnaby, BC | 1 | 39 | This title change aired on tape delay | |
| 20 | Timothy Flowers | March 21, 1987 | NWA All-Star show | Cloverdale, BC | 1 | 72 | | |
| 21 | Jonathan Sayers | June 1, 1987 | N/A | Burnaby, BC | 1 | 5 | This title change aired on tape delay | |
| 22 | Bruiser Costa | June 6, 1987 | NWA All-Star show | Cloverdale, BC | 1 | N/A | | |
| 23 | J.R. Bundy | 1987 | NWA All-Star show | British Columbia | 2 | N/A | | |
| 24 | John Tenta | August 1, 1987 | NWA All-Star show | Cloverdale, BC | 1 | N/A | | |
| — | Vacated | 1987 | — | — | — | — | Championship vacated for undocumented reasons | |
| 25 | Ole Olson | October 1, 1987 | NWA All-Star show | Cloverdale, BC | 1 | 3 | Defeated Sweet Daddy Sampson | |
| 26 | Sweet Daddy Sampson | October 4, 1987 | All Star Wrestling | Burnaby, BC | 1 | 363 | This title change aired on tape delay | |
| 27 | Ole Olsen | October 1, 1988 | NWA All-Star show | Cloverdale, BC | 2 | N/A | | |
| 28 | The Olympian | N/A | NWA All-Star show | British Columbia | 1 | N/A | | |
| 29 | Pat Brady | N/A | NWA All-Star show | British Columbia | 1 | N/A | | |
| 30 | Steve E. Ocean | N/A | NWA All-Star show | British Columbia | 1 | N/A | | |
| 31 | Dan Denton | June 1989 | NWA All-Star show | British Columbia | 1 | N/A | | |
| — | Deactivated | 1989 | — | — | — | — | Promotion closed | |
