= NWA International Tag Team Championship (Vancouver version) =

Professional wrestling championship

The Vancouver version of the NWA International Tag Team Championship was a tag team title in NWA All Star Wrestling. It was established in 1982 as the top tag team championship in that promotion after the NWA Canadian Tag Team title became inactive early that year, but was demoted to secondary status after the Canadian championship was reactivated in June 1983 and remained the secondary tag team title until All Star withdrew from the NWA in late-1985, at which point the title was abandoned.

== Title history ==
Key
No.	Overall reign number
Reign	Reign number for the specific champion
Days	Number of days held

No.	Champion	Championship change			Reign statistics		Notes	Ref.
No.	Champion	Date	Event	Location	Reign	Days	Notes	Ref.
1	Ramon and Ricky Torres	1982	NWA All-Star show	N/A	1	N/A	Billed as champions on arrival	
2	Dean Ho and Sonny Myers	February 8, 1982	NWA All-Star show	British Columbia	1	54	Defeated Ramon Torres and Tiny Anderson for the championship	
3	Canadian Wrecking Crew (Terry Adonis and Bruiser Costa)	April 3, 1982	NWA All-Star show	Cloverdale, BC	1	142		
4	Dean Ho (2) and Moondog Morretti	August 23, 1982	NWA All-Star show	Vancouver, BC	1	138	Defeated Costa and Butcher Hughes to win the championship	
5	Al Tomko and Moose Morowski	January 8, 1983	NWA All-Star show	Cloverdale, BC	1	17		
—	Vacated	January 25, 1983	—	—	—	—	Championship vacated for undocumentd reasons	
6	Timothy Flowers and Terry Adonis	March 21, 1983	NWA All-Star show	Vancouver, BC	1	70	Defeat Dean Ho and Moondog Moretti in a tournament final	
7	Bob Brown and Buzz Tyler	May 30, 1983	NWA All-Star show	Vancouver, BC	1	N/A		
Championship history is unrecorded from May 30, 1983 to July 1985.
8	Timothy Flowers and Terry Adonis	N/A	NWA All-Star show	British Columbia	2	N/A	Unknown whom Flowers and Adonis defeated for the championship	
9	Al Tomko (2) and Bob Brown (2)	N/A	NWA All-Star show	British Columbia	1	N/A		
10	Elton Stanton and Butch Moffat	1985	NWA All-Star show	British Columbia	1	N/A		
—	Vacated	July 1985 (NLT	—	—	—	—	Stanton and Moffat were suspended	
Championship history is unrecorded from July 1985 to December 1985.
11	Rick Davis and Dave Gold	1985	NWA All-Star show	British Columbia	1	N/A	Unknown whom Davis and Gold defeated for the championship	
12	Sonny Myers and Super Destroyer	December 7, 1985	NWA All-Star show	British Columbia	1	N/A		
—	Deactivated	N/A	—	—	—	—	All Star Wrestling left the NWA	
