= Mike Sharpe =

Canadian professional wrestler (1951–2016)

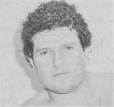

Personal information
- Born: Michael Sharpe; October 28, 1951 Hamilton, Ontario, Canada
- Died: January 17, 2016 (aged 64) Hamilton, Ontario, Canada

Professional wrestling career
- Ring name(s): “Iron” Mike Sharpe; Mike Sharpe; Mike Sharpe Jr.
- Billed height: 6 ft 4 in (1.93 m)
- Billed weight: 283 lb (128 kg)
- Trained by: Dewey Robertson
- Debut: 1973
- Retired: 1997

Michael Sharpe (October 28, 1951 – January 17, 2016) was a Canadian professional wrestler better known as "Iron" Mike Sharpe. A second-generation wrestler whose father and uncle (Mike and Ben Sharpe) also competed in the profession, Sharpe was a mainstay for various territories throughout the United States and became a regular for both the World Wrestling Federation and New Japan Pro-Wrestling.

== Professional wrestling career ==
Sharpe came from a family legacy of wrestling, as his father and uncle were a successful tag team in the 1950s, recognized as champions from San Francisco to Japan. He grew up in California, but moved with his mother back to Canada as a teenager. In high school, he dabbled in boxing and weightlifting before choosing to follow in his father's footsteps.

=== Early career (1973–1983) ===
Dewey Robertson trained him for the ring at age 25 and shortly thereafter Sharpe made his mark wrestling for promotions around Canada such as Gene Kiniski's NWA All Star Wrestling. He became a two-time NWA Canadian tag team champion, partnering first with Moose Morowski and later with Salvatore Bellomo, and also won the Pacific Coast Heavyweight Title. His career picked up steam after moving to Louisiana, where he became a fan favorite and won two different Mid-South Wrestling belts - Louisiana champion (two times) and the Mississippi title (also two times) along with a Brass Knucks title in 1979. He worked for Stampede Wrestling in Calgary from 1980 to 1981, where he held the Stampede International Tag Team Championship.

=== World Wrestling Federation (1983–1995) ===
In February 1983, Sharpe entered the World Wrestling Federation where he would stay until 1995. He was a regular of WWF programming throughout the mid-1980s and early 1990s. He was announced and self-proclaimed as "Canada's greatest athlete" (a nickname taken from Kiniski) and was further distinguished by his near-constant yelling and grunting throughout his matches, as well as a black brace on his right forearm, supposedly protecting an injury but more widely believed to contain a foreign object. Initially in his WWF career he was managed by Captain Lou Albano and received a sizeable push, regularly defeating jobbers after smashing them with his forearm. This culminated on April 30, 1983, with a match against world heavyweight champion Bob Backlund at the Philadelphia Spectrum, where Sharpe was defeated and would never reach such main event heights again. In fact, Sharpe would never hold a title for the promotion, and thereafter worked as a jobber to rising WWF stars in television tapings.

While Sharpe's television appearances were always as the role of a jobber, and victories even at house shows were rare, he chalked up quite a few untelevised victories between 1984 and 1988. Sharpe had a few more memorable moments over his WWF career. He appeared on Piper's Pit in 1984, provided the opposition in Ivan Putski's 1987 comeback match at Madison Square Garden, and pinned Boris Zhukov to reach the second round of the 1988 King Of The Ring tournament. And though he wrestled as a heel in the WWF, Sharpe was also the tag team partner of Hulk Hogan during a tour of Japan against stars of New Japan Pro-Wrestling in early 1984 (Hogan was a heel in Japan). Sharpe also competed briefly as a fan favorite in late 1988, with televised victories over Steve Lombardi and Barry Horowitz. Sharpe also wrestled in the New Japan Pro Wrestling and Continental Wrestling Association (CWA) in Memphis during late 1984 and early 1985, holding their NWA Mid-America Heavyweight Championship. In 1991, Sharpe did not wrestle for the WWF; instead he worked in New Jersey and Germany. His last televised match was on June 6, 1995, in a losing tag-team effort with Duane Gill against the Smoking Gunns.

=== Later career (1995–1997) ===
After leaving the WWF, Sharpe continued to wrestle in the independent circuit. On May 11, 1996, he competed in a match for the Mid-Eastern Wrestling Federation where he was defeated by Nikolai Volkoff, and lost to Virgil on June 22. He faced against Bam Bam Bigelow on June 2, 1996, for New Jack City Wrestling where Bigelow was the winner. On December 7, 1996, Sharpe was defeated by Ax at USA Pro. He lost to King Kong Bundy on April 20, 1997 at New Jack City Wrestling in New Jersey. Sharpe's last match was on November 15, 1997, Mid-Eastern Wrestling Federation where he was defeated by George Steele.

For some time after his retirement Sharpe made his living teaching aspiring wrestlers at Mike Sharpe's School of Pro-Wrestling located in Brick, New Jersey and later Asbury Park, New Jersey (the school has since closed). Among the better known of his protégés are Mike Bucci, Crowbar and the Haas Brothers, Charlie and Russ.

== Personal life ==
Sharpe was described in at least three books by former wrestling personalities; Dynamite Kid, Hulk Hogan and Gary Michael Cappetta, and by longtime WWF wrestler-commentator Gorilla Monsoon, as having shown characteristics of obsessive-compulsive disorder, as evidenced by a preoccupation with cleanliness that caused him to spend hours washing his hands or showering at arenas and meticulously folding and re-folding his clothing. According to Cappetta, Sharpe's behavior earned him the nickname "Mr. Clean" among his co-workers. At a televised house show in the Boston Garden in March 1986, Monsoon even joked to fellow commentator Lord Alfred Hayes that Sharpe had the first match of the night at a previous Boston show, and was still in the showers when they locked up later that night forcing him to spend the night in the arena. During his WWF career, many commentators also noted that other than his obsessive cleaning, Sharpe was also obsessed with physical fitness and that if he was not in the ring or in the showers, he would be working out.

=== Health issues and death ===
In 2007 he returned to Hamilton to live with his aging mother. That summer while doing a landscaping job he suffered a deep cut to his leg which became infected. He began using a wheelchair and ended up living in a basement apartment where he became a recluse. Other health problems developed along the way. Only in 2015 did he allow a videocamera to record him as part of a tribute to Angelo Mosca Sr. Sharpe died on January 17, 2016, in Hamilton, Ontario, Canada at the age of 64.

== Championships and accomplishments ==
- Continental Wrestling Association
  - NWA Mid-America Heavyweight Championship (1 time)
- Five Star Wrestling
  - FSW Tag Team Championship (1 time) - with I.C. Glory
- Mid-South Wrestling Association
  - Mid-South Louisiana Championship (Mid-South Louisiana Championship#Title History)
- NWA All-Star Wrestling
  - NWA Canadian Tag Team Championship (Vancouver version) (2 time) - with The Black Avenger (1) and Salvatore Martino (1)
  - NWA Pacific Coast Heavyweight Championship (Vancouver version) (1 time)
- NWA Tri-State
  - NWA Tri-State Brass Knuckles Championship (1 time)
- Professional Organization of Wrestling
  - POW Heavyweight Championship (1 time)
- World Wide Wrestling Alliance
  - WWWA Intercontinental Championship (1 time)
