= UWA Tag Team Championship (Vancouver Version) =

Professional wrestling tag team championship

The Vancouver version of the UWA Tag Team Championship was the tag team title in All Star Wrestling from its establishment sometime after All Star disaffiliated from the National Wrestling Alliance in late-1985 until the promotion closed in 1989.

== Title history ==
Key
| No. | Overall reign number |
| Reign | Reign number for the specific team—reign numbers for the individuals are in parentheses, if different |
| Days | Number of days held |

| No. | Champion | Championship change | | | Reign statistics | | Notes | Ref. |
| No. | Champion | Date | Event | Location | Reign | Days | Notes | Ref. |
|---|---|---|---|---|---|---|---|---|
| 1 | Rick Davis and Ole Olsen | July 6, 1985 | ASW show | Cloverdale, BC | 1 | N/A | Defeated Sonny Myers and Tim Patterson for the NWA Canadian Tag Team Championship, which was then renamed the UWA Tag Team Championship when All-Star Wrestling left the NWA. | |
| 2 | Dave Gold and Tim Patterson | September 9, 1985 | ASW show | Cloverdale, BC | 1 | N/A | | |
| 3 | Rick Davis and Ole Olsen | October 5, 1985 | ASW show | Cloverdale, BC | 2 | N/A | | |
| — | Vacated | January 1986 | — | — | — | — | Vacated when Olsen was injured | |
| 4 | Buddy Austin and Mike Stone | March 22, 1986 | ASW show | Cloverdale, BC | 1 | N/A | Defeated Rick Davis and Rocky Delaserra. | |
| 5 | Rick Davis (3) and Rocky Delaserra | March 29, 1986 | ASW show | Cloverdale, BC | 1 | N/A | | |
| 6 | Rick Davis (4) and Mike Stone (2) | N/A | ASW show | British Columbia | 1 | N/A | | |
| 7 | The Knight Riders (Bear and Harley) | N/A | ASW show | British Columbia | 1 | N/A | | |
| 8 | Rick Davis (5) and Pat Bradley | N/A | ASW show | British Columbia | 1 | N/A | | |
| 9 | J.R. Bundy and Ivan Gorky | N/A | ASW show | British Columbia | 1 | N/A | | |
| 10 | Rick Davis (6) and Billy Two Eagles | N/A | ASW show | British Columbia | 1 | N/A | | |
| 11 | Timothy Flowers and Jonathan Sayers | 1987 | ASW show | British Columbia | 1 | N/A | Unknown whom Flowers and Sayers beat for the title | |
| 12 | Rick Davis (7) and J.R. Bundy (2) | May 9, 1987 | ASW show | Cloverdale, BC | 1 | N/A | | |
| 13 | Timothy Flowers (2) and Ivan Gorky (2) | June 6, 1987 | ASW show | Cloverdale, BC | 1 | N/A | | |
| 14 | The Frog and Atomic Kid | 1987 | ASW show | British Columbia | 1 | N/A | | |
| 15 | I-Ton and Dory Singh | January 2, 1988 | ASW show | Cloverdale, BC | 1 | N/A | | |
| 16 | Michelle Starr and Ivan Gorky (3) | N/A | ASW show | British Columbia | 1 | N/A | | |
| — | Vacated | 1989 | — | — | — | — | Vacated for undocumented reasons | |
| 17 | Robotron and Olympian | June 1989 | ASW show | British Columbia | 1 | N/A | | |
| — | Deactivated | July 2, 1989 | ASW show | — | — | — | Title was abandoned after All-Star Wrestling held its final event in Elk Grove, British Columbia. | |

== See also ==
- Professional wrestling in Canada
