= NWA Canadian Tag Team Championship (Vancouver version) =

Professional wrestling tag team championship

Details
- Promotion: NWA All-Star Wrestling
- Date established: 1962-11-12
- Date retired: 1985 (renamed UWA Tag Team Championship)
Statistics
- First champions: Sandor Kovacs and Dan Miller
- Most reigns: The Fabulous Kangaroos (Al Costello & Roy Heffernan), Bob Brown & John Quinn and Steven Little Bear & Dutch Savage (4 reigns)
- Longest reign: Chris and John Tolos (182 days)

The Vancouver version of the NWA Canadian Tag Team Championship was established in 1962 as the top tag team title in NWA All-Star Wrestling. The title held that status until late summer 1985, when the title was renamed the UWA Tag Team Championship upon All-Star Wrestling's departure as a member of the National Wrestling Alliance, aside from the period from June 1966 to December 1967, when the promotion had a version of the NWA World Tag Team Championship, which was abandoned after that time.

== Title history ==
Key
No.	Overall reign number
Reign	Reign number for the specific champion
Days	Number of days held

No.	Champion	Championship change			Reign statistics		Notes	Ref.
No.	Champion	Date	Event	Location	Reign	Days	Notes	Ref.
1	Sandor Kovacs and Dan Miller	November 12, 1962	NWA All-Star Show	Vancouver, BC	1	91	Defeated Gene Kiniski and Clyde Stevens in a tournament final.	
2	Gene Kiniski and Mr. X	February 11, 1963	NWA All-Star Show	Vancouver, BC	1	28		
3	Mitsu Arakawa and Kinji Shibuya	March 11, 1963	NWA All-Star Show	Vancouver, BC	1	0		
4	Ron Etchison and Dan Miller	March 11, 1963	NWA All-Star Show	Vancouver, BC	1	133		
5	Kinji Shibuya and Sweet Daddy Siki	July 22, 1963	NWA All-Star Show	Vancouver, BC	1	71		
6	Dan Miller and Whipper Billy Watson	October 1, 1963	NWA All-Star Show	Vancouver, BC	1	N/A		
—	Vacated	1963	—	—	—	—	Championship vacated for undocumented reasons	
8	Don Leo Jonathan and Kinji Shibuya	January 20, 1964	NWA All-Star Show	Vancouver, BC	1	84	Defeated Dory Funk and Dory Funk, Jr. in a tournament final.	
9	Enrique Torres and Bearcat Wright	April 13, 1964	NWA All-Star Show	Vancouver, BC	1	42		
10	The Fabulous Kangaroos (Al Costello and Roy Heffernan)	May 25, 1964	NWA All-Star Show	Vancouver, BC	1	126		
11	Don Leo Jonathan and Roy McClarty	September 28, 1964	NWA All-Star Show	Vancouver, BC	1	21		
12	The Fabulous Kangaroos (Al Costello and Roy Heffernan)	October 19, 1964	NWA All-Star Show	Vancouver, BC	2	84		
13	Don Leo Jonathan and Gene Kiniski	January 11, 1965	NWA All-Star Show	Vancouver, BC	1	21		
14	The Fabulous Kangaroos (Al Costello and Roy Heffernan)	February 1, 1965	NWA All-Star Show	Vancouver, BC	3	28		
15	Red Bastien and Jim Hady	March 1, 1965	NWA All-Star Show	N/A	1	21		
16	The Fabulous Kangaroos (Al Costello and Roy Heffernan)	March 22, 1965	NWA All-Star Show	Vancouver, BC	4	56		
17	Jim Hady and Don Leo Jonathan	May 17, 1965	NWA All-Star Show	Vancouver, BC	1	126		
18	Ivan Kameroff and Art Nielson	September 20, 1965	NWA All-Star Show	Vancouver, BC	1	49		
19	Paddy Barrett and Tom Geohagen	November 8, 1965	NWA All-Star Show	Vancouver, BC	1	84		
20	Black Terror and John Tolos	January 31, 1966	NWA All-Star Show	Vancouver, BC	1	28		
21	Paddy Barrett and Tom Geohagen	February 28, 1966	NWA All-Star Show	Vancouver, BC	2	70		
22	Tony Borne and John Tolos	May 9, 1966	NWA All-Star Show	Vancouver, BC	1	56		
23	Haystacks Calhoun and Don Leo Jonathan	July 4, 1966	NWA All-Star Show	Vancouver, BC	1	7		
24	Tony Borne and John Tolos	July 11, 1966	NWA All-Star Show	Vancouver, BC	2	77		
25	Don Jardine and Dutch Savage	September 26, 1966	NWA All-Star Show	Vancouver, BC	1	35		
26	Don Jardine and Don Leo Jonathan	October 31, 1966	NWA All-Star Show	Vancouver, BC	1	77		
27	Chris and John Tolos	January 16, 1967	NWA All-Star Show	Vancouver, BC	1	77		
28	Rocky Johnson and Don Leo Jonathan	April 3, 1967	NWA All-Star Show	Vancouver, BC	1	21		
29	Chris and John Tolos	April 24, 1967	NWA All-Star Show	Vancouver, BC	2	182		
30	Abdullah the Butcher and Jerry Graham	October 23, 1967	NWA All-Star Show	Vancouver, BC	2	42		
31	The Assassins	December 4, 1967	NWA All-Star Show	Vancouver, BC	1	112		
32	Don Leo Jonathan and Sky-Hi Jones	March 25, 1968	NWA All-Star Show	Vancouver, BC	1	21		
33	The Assassins	April 15, 1968	NWA All-Star Show	Vancouver, BC	2	49		
34	Haystacks Calhoun and Don Leo Jonathan	June 3, 1968	NWA All-Star Show	Vancouver, BC	2	28		
35	Abdullah the Butcher and Armand Hussein	July 1, 1968	NWA All-Star Show	Vancouver, BC	1	21		
36	Paddy Barrett and Don Leo Jonathan	July 22, 1968	NWA All-Star Show	Vancouver, BC	1	42		
37	Dutch Savage and Stan Stasiak	September 2, 1968	NWA All-Star Show	Vancouver, BC	1	21		
38	Don Leo Jonathan and Johnny Kostas	September 23, 1968	NWA All-Star Show	Vancouver, BC	1	77		
39	Dutch Savage and John Tolos	December 9, 1968	NWA All-Star Show	Vancouver, BC	1	N/A		
—	Vacated	March 31, 1969	—	—	—	—	Championship vacated when Savage and Tolos split up.	
40	Dean Higuchi and Earl Maynard	May 12, 1969	NWA All-Star Show	Vancouver, BC	1	28	Defeated Gene Kiniski and Bad Boy Shields in a tournament final.	
41	Bob Brown and Dutch Savage	June 9, 1969	NWA All-Star Show	Vancouver, BC	1	77		
42	Don Leo Jonathan and John Tolos	August 25, 1969	NWA All-Star Show	Vancouver, BC	1	35		
43	Bob Brown and Dutch Savage	September 29, 1969	NWA All-Star Show	Vancouver, BC	2	70		
44	Steve Bolus and Dean Higuchi	December 8, 1969	NWA All-Star Show	Vancouver, BC	1	63		
45	Bob Brown and John Quinn	February 9, 1970	NWA All-Star Show	Vancouver, BC	1	210		
46	Don Leo Jonathan and Duncan McTavish	September 7, 1970	NWA All-Star Show	Vancouver, BC	1	35		
47	Yasu Fuji and Chati Yokouchi	October 12, 1970	NWA All-Star Show	Vancouver, BC	1	28		
48	Don Leo Jonathan and Steven Little Bear	November 9, 1970	NWA All-Star Show	Vancouver, BC	1	98		
49	John Quinn and Dutch Savage	February 15, 1971	NWA All-Star Show	Vancouver, BC	1	28		
50	Dean Higuchi and Steven Little Bear	March 15, 1971	NWA All-Star Show	Vancouver, BC	1	91		
51	The Skull Brothers	June 14, 1971	NWA All-Star Show	Vancouver, BC	1	21		
52	Dean Higuchi and Steven Little Bear	July 5, 1971	NWA All-Star Show	Vancouver, BC	2	98		
53	Bob Brown and Gene Kiniski	October 11, 1971	NWA All-Star Show	Vancouver, BC	1	49		
54	Mark Lewin and Steven Little Bear	November 29, 1971	NWA All-Star Show	Vancouver, BC	1	56		
55	Bob Brown and Gene Kiniski	January 24, 1972	NWA All-Star Show	Vancouver, BC	2	91		
56	Steven Little Bear and Dutch Savage	April 24, 1972	NWA All-Star Show	Vancouver, BC	1	105		
57	Bob Brown and John Quinn	August 7, 1972	NWA All-Star Show	New Westminster, BC	2	7		
58	Steven Little Bear and Dutch Savage	August 14, 1972	NWA All-Star Show	New Westminster, BC	2	21		
59	Bob Brown and John Quinn	September 4, 1972	NWA All-Star Show	New Westminster, BC	3	N/A		
60	Steven Little Bear and Dutch Savage	1972	NWA All-Star Show	N/A	3	N/A		
61	Bob Brown and John Quinn	1972	NWA All-Star Show	N/A	4	N/A		
62	Steven Little Bear and Dutch Savage	January 22, 1973 (NLT)	NWA All-Star Show	N/A	4	0		
63	The Brute and Mike Webster	January 22, 1973	NWA All-Star Show	New Westminster, BC	1	175		
64	John Quinn and Gerry Romano	July 16, 1973	NWA All-Star Show	New Westminster, BC	1	35		
65	The Brute and Gene Kiniski	August 20, 1973	NWA All-Star Show	New Westminster, BC	1	77		
66	The Wild Samoans (Afa and Sika)	November 5, 1973	NWA All-Star Show	Vancouver, BC	1	42		
67	Buck Ramstead and Mr. X	December 17, 1973	NWA All-Star Show	Vancouver, BC	1	42		
68	Flash Gordon and Leo Madril	January 28, 1974	NWA All-Star Show	Vancouver, BC	1	79		
69	Gene Kiniski and Mr. X	April 17, 1974	NWA All-Star Show	Vancouver, BC	2	12		
70	Dan Kroffat and Leo Madril	April 29, 1974	NWA All-Star Show	Vancouver, BC	1	28		
71	The Brute and Mr. X	May 27, 1974	NWA All-Star Show	Vancouver, BC	1	70		
72	Gene Kiniski and Dutch Savage	August 5, 1974	NWA All-Star Show	Vancouver, BC	1	84		
73	Wayne Bridges and Dan Kroffat	October 28, 1974	NWA All-Star Show	Vancouver, BC	1	14		
74	Gene Kiniski and Mr. Saito	November 11, 1974	NWA All-Star Show	Vancouver, BC	1	112		
75	Ormand Malumba and Guy Mitchell	March 3, 1975	NWA All-Star Show	Vancouver, BC	1	77		
76	Gene Kiniski and Dale Lewis	May 19, 1975	NWA All-Star Show	Vancouver, BC	1	28		
77	Ricky Hunter and Guy Mitchell	June 16, 1975	NWA All-Star Show	Vancouver, BC	1	55		
78	Dale Lewis and Mr. Saito	August 10, 1975	NWA All-Star Show	Vancouver, BC	1	29		
79	Tiger Jeet Singh and Dennis Stamp	September 8, 1975	NWA All-Star Show	Vancouver, BC	1	32		
80	Dale Lewis and Siegfried Steinke	October 10, 1975	NWA All-Star Show	Vancouver, BC	1	45		
81	Mike and Pat Kelly	November 24, 1975	NWA All-Star Show	Vancouver, BC	1	14		
82	Dale Lewis and Siegfried Steinke	December 8, 1975	NWA All-Star Show	Vancouver, BC	2	35		
83	Dean Higuchi and George Wells	January 12, 1976	NWA All-Star Show	Vancouver, BC	1	28		
84	Gene Kiniski and Siegfried Steinke	February 9, 1976	NWA All-Star Show	Vancouver, BC	1	63		
85	Don Leo Jonathan and Jimmy Snuka	April 12, 1976	NWA All-Star Show	Vancouver, BC	1	35		
86	John Quinn and Kinji Shibuya	May 17, 1976	NWA All-Star Show	Vancouver, BC	1	140		
87	John Anson and Don Leo Jonathan	October 4, 1976	NWA All-Star Show	Vancouver, BC	1	24		
88	John Quinn and Kurt Von Hess	October 28, 1976	NWA All-Star Show	Vancouver, BC	1	81		
89	Don Leo Jonathan and Dutch Savage	January 17, 1977	NWA All-Star Show	Vancouver, BC	1	49		
90	John Anson and Sky-Hi Morse	March 7, 1977	NWA All-Star Show	Vancouver, BC	1	N/A		
—	Vacated	April 1977	—	—	—	—	Championship vacated for undocumented reasons	
91	Joe Palardy and The Texas Outlaw	May 2, 1977	NWA All-Star Show	Vancouver, BC	1	70	Defeated Eddie and Jerry Morrow in a tournament final.	
92	Eddie and Jerry Morrow	July 11, 1977	NWA All-Star Show	Vancouver, BC	1	42		
93	Black Avenger and The Texas Outlaw	August 22, 1977	NWA All-Star Show	Vancouver, BC	1	7		
94	Eric Froelich and Guy Mitchell	August 29, 1977	NWA All-Star Show	Vancouver, BC	1	35		
95	Black Avenger and Mike Sharpe	October 3, 1977	NWA All-Star Show	Vancouver, BC	1	79		
96	Gama Singh and Igor Volkoff	December 21, 1977	NWA All-Star Show	Vancouver, BC	1	35		
97	Black Avenger and Don Wayt	January 25, 1978	NWA All-Star Show	Vancouver, BC	1	33		
98	Don Leo Jonathan and John Quinn	February 27, 1978	NWA All-Star Show	Vancouver, BC	1	N/A		
—	Vacated	1973	—	—	—	—	Championship vacated for undocumented reasons	
99	The Iron Sheik and The Texas Outlaw	July 24, 1978	NWA All-Star Show	Vancouver, BC	1	77	Defeated Don Leo Jonathan and Jake Roberts in a tournament final.	
100	Salvatore Martino and Mike Sharpe	October 9, 1978	NWA All-Star Show	Vancouver, BC	1	N/A		
101	UFO and Igor Volkoff	January 1979 (NLT)	NWA All-Star Show	N/A	1	N/A		
102	Bill Cody and Salvatore Martino	February 12, 1979	NWA All-Star Show	Vancouver, BC	1	28		
103	The Mongol and Igor Volkoff	March 12, 1979	NWA All-Star Show	Vancouver, BC	1	N/A	Defeated Salvatore Martino and Joe Ventura.	
104	Bobby Bass and Joe Ventura	April 1979	NWA All-Star Show	N/A	1	N/A		
105	Chris Colt and Bobby Jaggers	July 1979	NWA All-Star Show	N/A	1	N/A		
106	Bobby Bass and Yaki Joe	September 1979	NWA All-Star Show	N/A	1	N/A		
107	Chris Colt and Buddy Rose	November 12, 1979	NWA All-Star Show	Vancouver, BC	1	N/A	Defeated Bobby Bass and The Texas Outlaw.	
108	Dutch Savage and Stan Stasiak	December 1979	NWA All-Star Show	N/A	2	N/A		
109	The Kiwi Sheepherders (Butch Miller and Luke Williams)	February 11, 1980	NWA All-Star Show	Vancouver, BC	1	98		
110	Rick Martel and Roddy Piper	May 19, 1980	NWA All-Star Show	Vancouver, BC	1	N/A		
—	Vacated	1980	—	—	—	—	Championship vacated for undocumented reasons	
111	Fidel Cortez and Rip Oliver	October 6, 1980	NWA All-Star Show	Vancouver, BC	1	28	Defeated Mike Popovich and Al Tomko.	
112	Joe Ventura and Jay Youngblood	November 3, 1980	NWA All-Star Show	Vancouver, BC	1	70		
113	Rip Oliver and Buddy Rose	January 12, 1981	NWA All-Star Show	Vancouver, BC	1	N/A		
—	Vacated	1981	—	—	—	—	Championship vacated for undocumented reasons	
114	Terry Adonis and Moondog Moretti	May 4, 1981	NWA All-Star Show	Vancouver, BC	1	56	Defeated Klondike Mike and Al Tomko in a tournament final.	
115	Klondike Mike and Danny O	June 29, 1981	NWA All-Star Show	Vancouver, BC	1	N/A		
116	Al Tomko and Igor Volkoff	September 1981	NWA All-Star Show	N/A	1	N/A		
117	Dean Ho and Klondike Mike	November 30, 1981	NWA All-Star Show	Vancouver, BC	1	N/A		
—	Vacated	1982	—	—	—	—	Championship vacated for undocumented reasons	
118	Timothy Flowers and Rick Patterson	June 1983	NWA All-Star Show	Cloverdale, BC	1	N/A		
119	Bob Brown and Al Tomko	July 24, 1983	NWA All-Star Show	Cloverdale, BC	1	N/A		
—	Vacated	1983	—	—	—	—	Championship vacated for undocumented reasons	
120	Rick Patterson and Randy Rich	December 31, 1983	NWA All-Star Show	Cloverdale, BC	1	23	Defeated Star Rider and Snake Williams.	
121	Athol Foley and Snake Williams	January 23, 1984	NWA All-Star Show	Cloverdale, BC	1	33		
122	Moondog Moretti and Star Rider	February 25, 1984	NWA All-Star Show	Cloverdale, BC	1	37		
123	The Warlords (Easy Rider and Snake Williams)	April 2, 1984	NWA All-Star Show	Vancouver, BC	1	82		
124	Ole Olson and Randy Rich	June 23, 1984	NWA All-Star Show	Cloverdale, BC	1	126		
125	Bruiser Costa and Spider Web	October 27, 1984	NWA All-Star Show	Cloverdale, BC	1	N/A		
—	Vacated	N/A	—	—	—	—	Championship vacated when Bruiser Costa left the area.	
126	Butch Moffat and Elton Stanton	January 1985	NWA All-Star Show	Cloverdale, BC	1	N/A	Defeated Moondog Moretti and Rick Davis.	
127	Rick Davis and Tim Patterson	January 19, 1985	NWA All-Star Show	Cloverdale, BC	1	84		
128	Mike Dupree and Sonny Myers	April 13, 1985	NWA All-Star Show	Cloverdale, BC	1	28		
129	Rick Davis and Ole Olsen	May 11, 1985	NWA All-Star Show	Cloverdale, BC	1	28		
130	Sonny Myers and Tim Patterson	June 8, 1985	NWA All-Star Show	Cloverdale, BC	1	28		
131	Rick Davis and Ole Olsen	July 6, 1985	NWA All-Star Show	Cloverdale, BC	2	N/A		
—	Deactivated	N/A	—	—	—	—	Renamed the UWA (Universal Wrestling Alliance) Tag Team Championship upon All-Star Wrestling's departure from the National Wrestling Alliance.	

== See also ==
- National Wrestling Alliance
- National Wrestling Alliance championships
- NWA All-Star Wrestling
- NWA World Tag Team Championship (Vancouver version)
- UWA Tag Team Championship
