= Kinji Shibuya =

American professional wrestler (1921–2010)

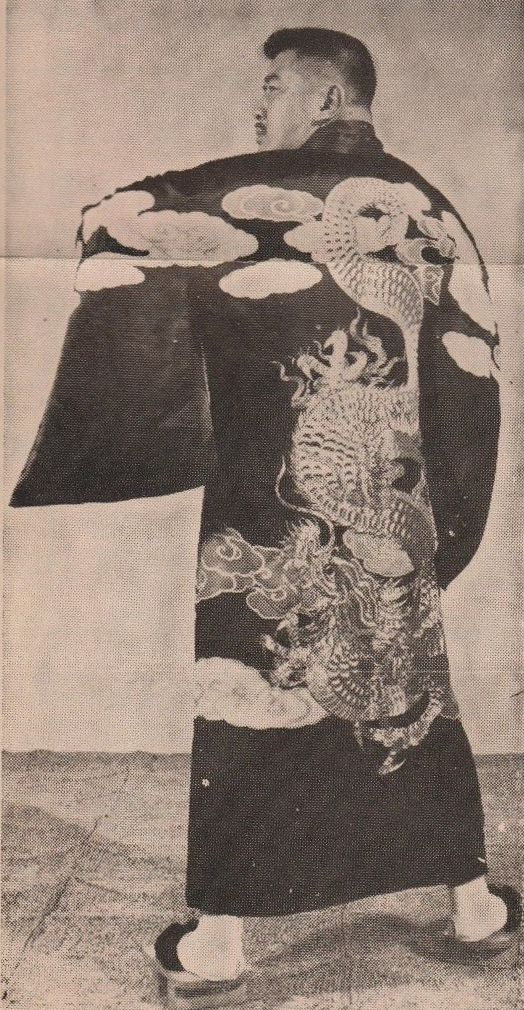

Personal information
- Born: Robert Shibuya; May 16, 1921 Utah, U.S.
- Died: May 3, 2010 (aged 88) Hayward, California, U.S.
- Education: University of Hawaiʻi

Professional wrestling career
- Ring name(s): Kinji Shibuya; Kenji Shibuya; Sato Keomuka
- Billed height: 5 ft 9 in (175 cm)
- Billed weight: 249 lb (113 kg)
- Billed from: Japan
- Trained by: Tsutao Higami
- Debut: 1952
- Retired: 1976

Robert "Kinji" Shibuya (May 16, 1921 – May 3, 2010) was an American professional wrestler and actor.

== Early life, family and education ==
Shibuya was born in Utah. He and his four brothers were raised in California. He attended Belmont High School in Los Angeles.

He attended college at Los Angeles City College and University of Hawaiʻi, playing football at both

== Career ==
After college, Shibuya played semi-professional football for the Honolulu Polar Bears and Honolulu Warriors. He performed sumo and jiu-jitsu as well. In 1952, promoter Al Karasick suggested Shibuya try professional wrestling.

He was originally given a gimmick of a Japanese heel, leveraging anti-Japanese sentiment stemming from World War II. He wrestled in the US and Canada's Stampede Wrestling and All-Star Wrestling. Shibuya credited Verne Gagne for first making him popular as a villain in 1955.

Shibuya was a frequent tag team partner of Mitsu Arakawa, who was billed as his cousin. In 1957, they held the Minneapolis version of the NWA World Tag Team Championship.

Shibuya was featured on a "This is Your Life" segment on the television show Canvas Cavity and appeared on the show several times in the 1970s and 1980s.

After retiring from wrestling, he also had small acting roles on shows such as Kung Fu and Mr. T and Tina. He appeared in the films Days of a Bawdy Ballad and Hammett.

== Personal life ==
He and his wife Janet were married for 59 years and had a daughter and a son. They resided for many years in Northern California. Their son Robert Shibuya became the Chairman & CEO of Mohr Partners, a global corporate real estate advisory firm based in Dallas.

Kinji Shibuya loved large automobiles, painting and Japanese gardening as well as raising koi. He died of natural causes on May 3, 2010. He was cremated, and his funeral service was held at a Buddhist temple.

== Championships and accomplishments ==
- Big Time Wrestling (San Francisco)
  - NWA United States Heavyweight Championship (San Francisco version) (3 times)
  - NWA World Tag Team Championship (San Francisco version) (5 times) - with Masa Saito (2), Great Mephisto (1), Great Sasaki (1), and Mitsu Arakawa (1)
- Cauliflower Alley Club
  - Other honoree (1993)
- Central States Wrestling
  - NWA Central States Heavyweight Championship (1 time)
- Mid-Atlantic Championship Wrestling
  - NWA Southern Tag Team Championship (Mid-Atlantic version) (2 times) - with Mr. Moto
- NWA All-Star Wrestling
  - NWA Canadian Tag Team Championship (Vancouver version) (4 times) - with Mitsu Arakawa (1), Sweet Daddy Siki (1), Don Leo Jonathan (1), and John Quinn (1)
  - NWA Pacific Coast Heavyweight Championship (Vancouver version) (1 time)
- NWA Hollywood Wrestling
  - NWA Americas Heavyweight Championship (1 time)
  - NWA Americas Tag Team Championship (5 times) - with Masa Saito (3), Great Goliath (1), Killer Kowalski (1)
  - NWA "Beat the Champ" Television Championship (5 times)
- NWA Minneapolis Wrestling and Boxing Club
  - NWA World Tag Team Championship (Minneapolis version) (1 time) - with Mitsu Arakawa
- NWA Western States Sports
  - NWA North American Heavyweight Championship (Amarillo version) (1 time)
- Stampede Wrestling
  - Stampede International Tag Team Championship (1 time) - with Mitsu Arakawa
- World Class Championship Wrestling
  - NWA Texas Tag Team Championship (1 time) - with Duke Keomuka
