= Al Tomko =

Canadian professional wrestler

- Master Sergeant Tomko as NWA Canadian Heavyweight Champion

Personal information
- Born: 22 November 1931 Winnipeg, Manitoba, Canada
- Died: 5 August 2009 (aged 77) Blaine, Washington, U.S.

Professional wrestling career
- Ring name(s): "Crazy Legs" Leroy Hirsch; The Zodiac; Cosmo #1; Master Sergeant Tomko
- Billed weight: 242 lb (110 kg)
- Debut: July 9, 1954
- Retired: 1989

Al Tomko (22 November 1931 – 5 August 2009) was a Canadian professional wrestler and wrestling promoter.

== Professional wrestling career ==
Tomko started out as a wrestler in his hometown of Winnipeg on 9 July 1954, with the Madison Wrestling Club, losing his debut match to John DePaulo. During that same period, he ran his own promotion in Winnipeg, the Olympia Wrestling Club. After he shut down the Olympia Club to pursue non-wrestling ventures, but he rejoined the larger Madison Club in the 1960s to become one of that promotion's top heels. He bought the Madison Club in 1967 and merged it with the American Wrestling Association in 1968.

Tomko acted as the AWA's Winnipeg promoter from 1966 through to the mid-1970s, and he was credited with launching the career of Roddy Piper. He also competed sometimes in Stampede Wrestling under a mask as Cosmo #1, and later wrestled without the mask in Stampede and in Vancouver's NWA All Star Wrestling as "Crazy Legs" Leroy Hirsch. In 1972, he started up another independent promotion called Central Canadian Championship Wrestling, which he ran in Manitoba cities and towns outside Winnipeg. He made use of mostly local talent, although he occasionally also brought in big-name stars for special appearances.

Tomko later left Winnipeg and headed to Vancouver, where he bought Sandor Kovacs' ownership stake in NWA All Star in 1977. While promoting the Vancouver territory, he began pushing himself as All Star's top star under the ring name Master Sergeant Tomko in the early-1980s (despite his age, being physically past his prime, and lacking wrestling skills) and gave himself almost all of All Star's championships (including the Vancouver version of the NWA Canadian Heavyweight title) at various points. Under Tomko's leadership, All Star went into decline (with co-owner Gene Kiniski selling his share of the company in 1985) and went out of business by 1989.

== Personal life ==
His two sons were Todd (who wrestled under the ring name Rick Davis) and Terry (who competed as The Frog, first while wearing a mask, and later unmasked).

On 5 August 2009, Tomko died, aged 77, after a two-month bout with pancreatic cancer.

== Championships and accomplishments ==
- Madison Wrestling Club
  - MWC Tag Team Championship (1 time) – with Stan Mykietowich
- NWA All-Star Wrestling
  - NWA Canadian Heavyweight Championship (Vancouver version) (5 times)
  - NWA Canadian Tag Team Championship (Vancouver version) (2 times) – with Igor Volkoff (1) and Bob Brown (1)
  - NWA International Tag Team Championship (Vancouver version) (2 times) – with Moose Morowski (1) and Bob Brown (1)
  - UWA Heavyweight Championship (1 time)
- West Coast Championship Wrestling
  - WCCW Mid-Heavyweight Championship (1 time)
