= Valiant Brothers =

Professional wrestling tag team

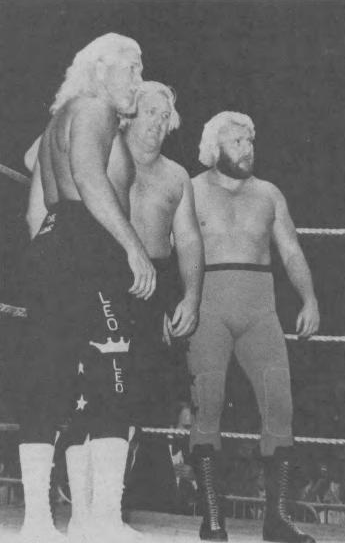
- Left to right: Jimmy, Jerry and Johnny, c. 1979

Tag team
- Members: Jimmy Valiant; Johnny Valiant; Jerry Valiant
- Billed heights: Jimmy: 6 ft 2 in (1.88 m); Johnny: 6 ft 0 in (1.83 m)
- Combined billed weight: 492 lb (223 kg) (Jimmy & Johnny)
- Billed from: New York City
- Debut: November 1973
- Disbanded: 1982
- Years active: 1973–1979

The Valiant Brothers were a professional wrestling tag team of storyline brothers "Handsome" Jimmy Valiant, "Luscious" Johnny Valiant, and "Gentleman" Jerry Valiant. The team wrestled for the National Wrestling Alliance (NWA), the World Wide Wrestling Federation / World Wrestling Federation (WWWF/WWF) and the World Wrestling Association (WWA).

== History ==
=== Jimmy and Johnny (1973–1978) ===
==== World Wrestling Association (1973-1974) ====
Jimmy Valiant and Johnny Valiant formed a tag team in World Wrestling Association as storyline brothers. They began wrestling together as heels. They debuted as a team on 5 January 1974 when they defeated Dick the Bruiser and Bruno Sammartino to win the WWA World Tag Team Championship. The titles were held up after a match against Bruiser and Sammartino on 25 January. On 7 February, they defeated Bruiser and Sammartino in a rematch to win the titles a second time. Despite being heels, who usually are hated by the crowd, the Valiant Brothers were cheered by the audience during their second reign. Their tenure with WWA ended after they lost the tag titles to Wilbur Snyder and Pepper Gomez on 4 May.

==== World Wide Wrestling Federation (1974–1975) ====
Jimmy and Johnny signed with Vincent J. McMahon's World Wide Wrestling Federation (WWWF) in May 1974 and debuted there around soon after. Their biggest success as a tag team came when they defeated Tony Garea and Dean Ho to win the WWWF World Tag Team Championship on the 8 May 1974 edition of All Star Wrestling. The Valiants quickly became a dominant heel tag team as they went on to successfully defend their titles for over a year before losing them to Dominic DeNucci and Victor Rivera on 13 May 1975. This made the Valiant Brothers the longest reigning champions of their era with a reign of 370 days. The record was broken fourteen years later by Demolition (Ax and Smash), who reigned as tag team champions for 470 days. After losing the titles, the Valiants battled against the likes of Tony Garea, Dean Ho, Chief Jay Strongbow and Haystacks Calhoun.

==== National Wrestling Alliance (1976–1978) ====
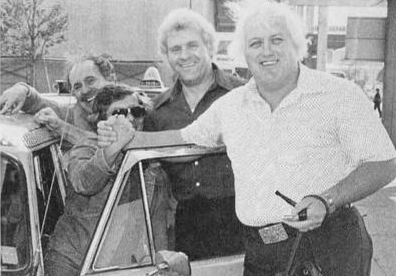
Johnny (right) and Jerry (center) with two New York cabbies

In 1976, Jimmy and Johnny left WWWF and joined the National Wrestling Alliance (NWA) where they toured various NWA territories. They debuted in Georgia Championship Wrestling (GCW) in the summer of 1976. On 16 July 1976, they defeated Dean Ho and Ken Mantell to win the NWA Georgia Tag Team Championship. On 10 September, they lost the titles to Porkchop Cash and Tom Jones. They joined San Francisco, California-based NWA San Francisco where they defeated the Royal Kangaroos (Jonathan Boyd and Norman Frederick Charles III) on 4 December 1976. They lost the titles to Pat Patterson and Pepper Gomez on 9 February 1977. Later that same year, they joined Championship Wrestling from Florida (CWF). In January 1978, they were awarded the NWA Florida United States Tag Team Championship. On 25 January 1978, they lost the titles to Florida natives Mike Graham and Steve Keirn.

=== Jerry and Johnny (1978–1982) ===
==== World Wide Wrestling Federation / World Wrestling Federation (1978–1979) ====
In 1978, the Valiant Brothers returned to WWWF but Jimmy retired and was replaced by "brother" Jerry Valiant. Jerry and Johnny began wrestling in the tag team division while Jimmy became their manager. In March 1979, the promotion was renamed the World Wrestling Federation, dropping 'Wide' from the name. On the 24 March 1979 edition of Championship Wrestling, Jerry and Johnny defeated Larry Zbyszko and Tony Garea to win the WWF Tag Team Championship. This second version of the Valiant Brothers was also successful, but Jerry could not achieve the popularity which Jimmy had achieved.

On 13 July 1979, they retained the championship in a match against The Jaguar of Colombia and Tito Santana. Jerry and Johnny lost the titles to Ivan Putski and Tito Santana on 22 October. After unsuccessful attempts in winning back the titles from Putski and Santana, the Valiant Brothers broke up in 1980, putting an end to the team.

==== Later years (1980–1982) ====
After leaving the WWF in 1979, Jerry and Johnny continued teaming without Jimmy. In 1980 they worked in Japan. Then in 1982, they reunited working in the independent circuit in the States. They disbanded later that year.

=== Aftermath ===
Jimmy and Johnny were inducted into the WWE Hall of Fame class of 1996 by Owen Hart and "The British Bulldog" Davey Boy Smith. All three Valiant Brothers have reunited on the independent circuit during the 2000s.

Jerry died on 10 March 2010 in Indianapolis after a battle with advanced Alzheimer's on set by post-concussion syndrome, while Johnny died on 4 April 2018 after being involved in a pickup truck crash in Ross Township, Pittsburgh, Pennsylvania, thereby ending any possibility of a reunion. Jimmy wrestled for independent shows unit 2022 at the age of 80.

== Championships and accomplishments ==
=== Jimmy and Johnny Valiant ===
- Championship Wrestling from Florida
  - NWA United States Tag Team Championship (Florida version) (1 time)
- Georgia Championship Wrestling
  - NWA Georgia Tag Team Championship (1 time)
- NWA San Francisco
  - NWA World Tag Team Championship (San Francisco version) (1 time)
- Pro Wrestling Illustrated
  - PWI Tag Team of the Year award in 1974
- World Wrestling Association (Indianapolis)
  - WWA World Tag Team Championship (4 times)
- World Wide Wrestling Federation / World Wrestling Federation
  - WWWF World Tag Team Championship (1 time)
  - WWF Hall of Fame (Class of 1996)

=== Jerry and Johnny Valiant ===
- World Wrestling Federation
  - WWF Tag Team Championship (1 time)
