= Tony Garea =

New Zealand professional wrestler (born 1946)

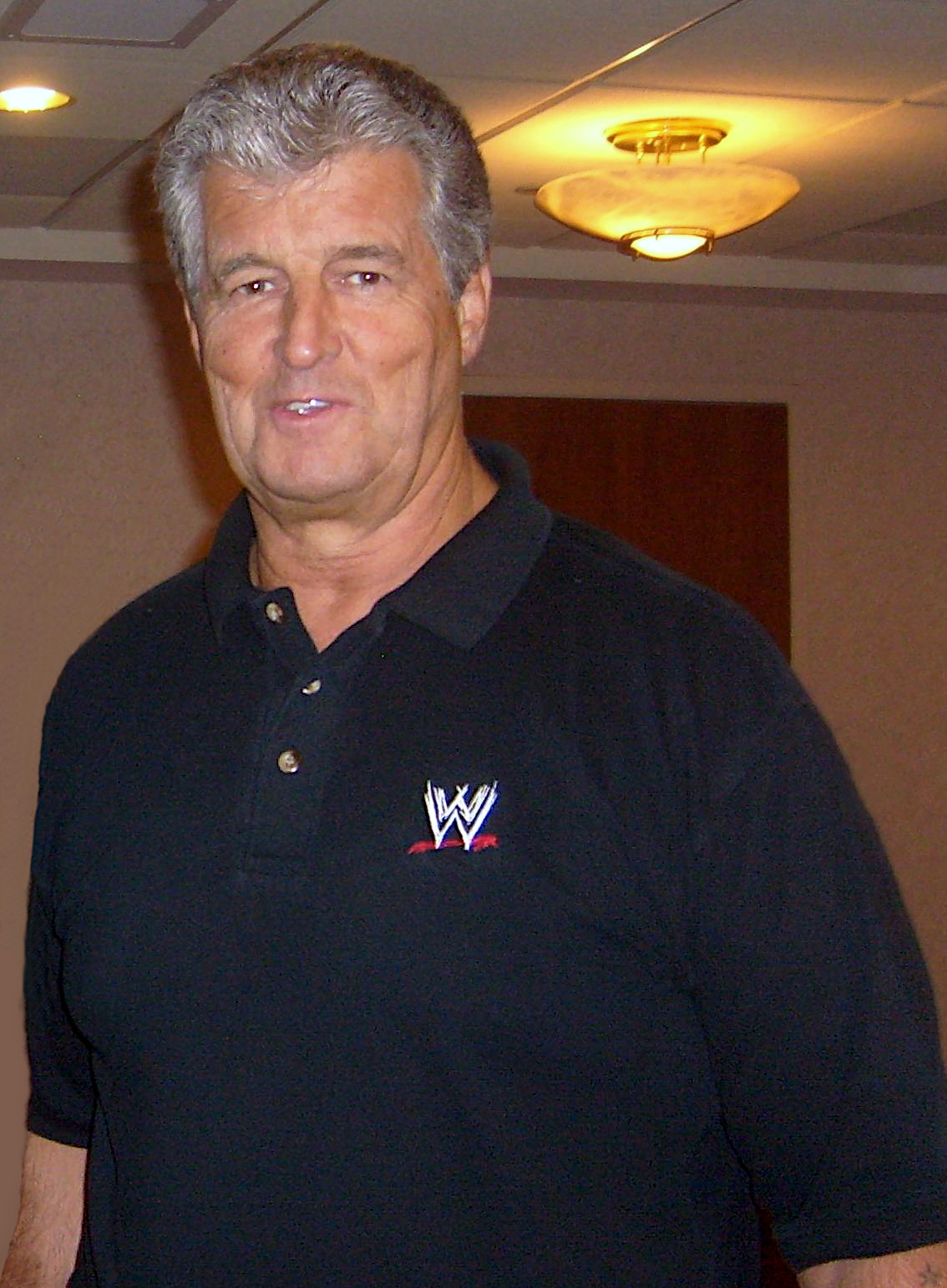
- Garea in 2007

Personal information
- Born: Anthony Gareljich; 20 September 1946 (age 80) Auckland, New Zealand

Professional wrestling career
- Ring name: Tony Garea
- Billed height: 6 ft 1 in (185 cm)
- Billed weight: 245 lb (111 kg)
- Billed from: Auckland, New Zealand
- Trained by: Wild Don Scott
- Debut: 1971
- Retired: 1989

Anthony Gareljich (born 20 September 1946) is a New Zealand retired professional wrestler, better known by his ring name, Tony Garea. He is best known for his appearances in the United States with the World Wide Wrestling Federation/World Wrestling Federation in the 1970s and 1980s.

== Early life ==
The son of Croatian-born Ivan Gareljich, Anthony Gareljich was born in Auckland, New Zealand, to parents of Yugoslavian and Irish descent. He was originally an accomplished sprinter and a rugby league player.

Garea grew up in New Zealand's largest city Auckland until he was 8. It was then that his parents bought an orchard on which they lived and worked for 6 years, before returning to the western suburbs of Auckland where Tony went to school for a further year before quitting just a month before his 15th birthday. After that he worked at various jobs including in a men's clothing store for 6 months, then he spent another 6 months delivering paint and wallpaper supplies before spending 18 months as a rope maker.

== Professional wrestling career ==
=== Early career and other promotions (1971–1978) ===
It was while playing rugby league in Auckland that Garea first became interested in professional wrestling as a couple of his clubs team mates were professional wrestlers in New Zealand and they invited him to try his hand at it. Garea was trained by Wild Don Scott on what he says was a wooden floor with a canvas covering and the only "padding" was a layer of felt under the canvas. He made his professional debut in his native New Zealand in 1971 against Don Scott for which he was paid $12. In New Zealand, wrestling was seasonal only taking part during the 3 winter months of June–August. During this time Garea was also wrestling against others who would later become stars themselves including Bob Miller and Luke Williams, better known as The Bushwhackers.

At this time however, Garea was actually more interested in playing rugby league than he was in wrestling. It was then local wrestling promoter Ernie Finch asked him to go on a 10 day tour to Australia for American promoter Jim Barnett's World Championship Wrestling to wrestle Bulldog Bob Brown. Once the 10 days were up, Barnett asked Garea to stay on and work for him for another 2 months with Barnett offering a base pay of $250 per week, which as Garea said in a shoot interview was much better than the $45 per week day job he had at home in Auckland.

After wrestling in Australia for Barnett a 2nd time, Barnett asked Garea if he wanted to go to America to further his wrestling career, which after advice from other local (Australian) wrestlers, he readily agreed to. He then travelled to North America armed only with wrestler/promoter Eddie Graham's phone number. Before arriving in America, Garea had never even spoken to Graham and indeed hadn't even heard of him until he agreed to go to America. Thankfully though Graham was receptive enough to the then unknown Kiwi that he got him a work visa and Garea made his USA wrestling debut for Graham in Florida.

He worked in the NWA San Francisco territory where he and Pat Patterson defeated Don Muraco and Invader I for the NWA San Francisco Tag Team Championship in May 1976. Also worked in Georgia from 1975 to 1976, Los Angeles in 1977, Japan and Australia both in 1978.

=== World Wide Wrestling Federation / World Wrestling Federation (1972–1989) ===
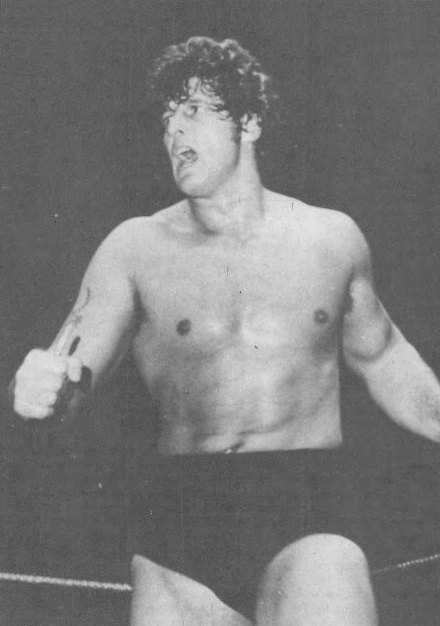
Garea, circa 1978

==== Debut and early tag team championship reigns (1972–1979) ====
Garea left New Zealand on 16 March 1972 and went to the United States where he had a handshake agreement with Vince McMahon, Sr.'s World Wide Wrestling Federation (WWWF). He made his WWWF debut at a TV taping in the Philadelphia Arena on 20 September 1972 as a babyface, defeating Davey O'Hannon. On 30 May 1973, he teamed with Haystacks Calhoun and defeated Mr. Fuji and Professor Toru Tanaka to win his first WWWF World Tag Team Championship. Garea and Calhoun feuded with Fuji and Tanaka for the rest of the summer before losing the titles back to Fuji and Tanaka on 11 September.

Garea continued the feud with Fuji and Tanaka with a new partner, Dean Ho. On 14 November, Garea and Ho defeated Fuji and Tanaka for Garea's second and Ho's first WWWF World Tag Team Championship. Garea's second tag team reign was longer and better than his first reign. They held the titles for five and a half months before losing them to the Valiant Brothers (Jimmy and Johnny) on 8 May 1974 episode of All Star Wrestling. They continued teaming for a while before disbanding their tag team and working on their own. Garea, who had been successful as a tag team wrestler, began a singles career.

Garea continued his singles career for three years before forming a tag team with new partner Larry Zbyszko in August 1977. They began teaming after entering a tag team tournament for the vacant tag titles, where they were defeated by Mr. Fuji and Toru Tanaka in the finals on 27 September 1977. They continued to challenge for the titles before defeating The Yukon Lumberjacks (Eric and Pierre) for Garea's third and Zbyzsko's first WWWF World Tag Team Championship on edition of 21 November 1978 of Championship Wrestling. They held the titles for four months before losing them to Valiant Brothers (Jerry and Johnny) on edition of 24 March 1979 of Championship Wrestling. Later that same month, Wide was dropped from the promotion's name, renaming the promotion World Wrestling Federation. Shortly afterwards, Garea left the WWF and went to work in Japan and Mid-Atlantic for a year.

==== Teaming with Rick Martel (1980–1982) ====
In the summer of 1980, Garea returned to the WWF and continued to wrestle in the tag team division, with another former WWF Tag Team Champion Rene Goulet. The two participated in a tag team tournament for the titles, where they were defeated by The Wild Samoans (Afa and Sika) in the finals on 27 September 1980. Garea formed a tag team with new partner Rick Martel, which was Garea's most successful and most popular tag team. They defeated Wild Samoans on 8 November for Garea's fourth and Martel's first WWF Tag Team Championship. Garea and Martel continued to feud with the former champions for the rest of the year. After Wild Samoans left WWF, the champions began feuding with The Moondogs (King and Rex). They dropped the titles to Moondogs on edition of 17 March 1981 of Championship Wrestling.

Martel and Garea continued to feud with Moondogs, trying to regain the titles. On 8 June, Garea beat a young rookie named Man Mountain Canyon in Madison Square Garden, who returned to WWF four years later as King Kong Bundy. On edition of 21 July of Championship Wrestling, Martel and Garea defeated Moondogs in a rematch to win their second WWF Tag Team Championship as a team, though, it was Garea's fifth and final individual reign. Garea's final run as a tag team champion ended on edition of 17 October of Championship Wrestling after Garea and Martel were defeated by Mr. Fuji and Mr. Saito for the tag titles. Garea and Martel continued to feud with Fuji and Saito, trying to regain the titles but failed to do so.

==== Later career (1982–1989) ====
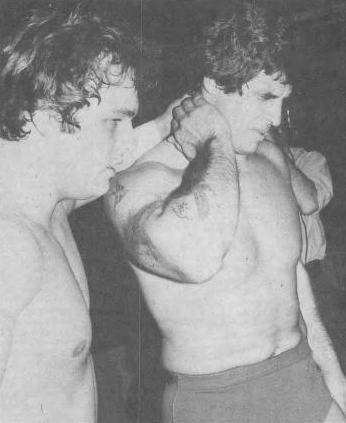
Garea (right) and Eddie Gilbert (left), circa 1983

Martel left WWF in 1982 while Garea went on his own. Garea teamed with newcomers to the WWF such as Eddie Gilbert and B. Brian Blair in 1983 and 1984, but was unable to recapture the success he previously enjoyed as a tag-team champion. He moved to the jobber to the stars status, jobbing to rising newcomers before retiring full-time in 1987. Garea participated in a World Wrestling Federation "Legends" battle royal, which was won by Lou Thesz on 16 November 1987. He would occasionally wrestle until his last match on 29 January 1989, when he lost to Conquistador Uno at a house show in Indianapolis, Indiana.

=== Retirement (1989–2014) ===
He thereafter worked as a road agent for the WWF until leaving the Company in 2014. He appeared with former tag team partner Rick Martel at Vengeance: Night of Champions in June 2007. They came to the aid of the team of Sgt. Slaughter and Jimmy Snuka, who were being attacked following their losing to Deuce 'n Domino.

When WWE came to New Zealand on 11 June 2008 in Auckland, Garea was a guest on the first international V.I.P Lounge along with Bushwacker Butch. The segment's host, Montel Vontavious Porter (MVP) announced him as Bushwhacker Luke but then apologized. Eventually, MVP attacked Butch and Garea with the microphone. Butch and Garea recovered and fought off MVP, then celebrated with the Bushwhacker walk. On 3 March 2009 he was featured on WWE.com exclusive segment Top-rope Theater posing as "Hacksaw" Jim Duggan. On 29 March 2010 episode of Monday Night Raw Garea appeared as a lumberjack in the Christian vs. Ted DiBiase lumberjack match. Towards the end of the match, Garea brawled with other legends that were serving as lumberjacks.

== Championships and accomplishments ==
- Big Time Wrestling (San Francisco)
  - NWA World Tag Team Championship (San Francisco version) (1 time) – with Pat Patterson
- George Tragos/Lou Thesz Professional Wrestling Hall of Fame
  - Jack Brisco Spotlight Award 2024
- Pro Wrestling Illustrated
  - PWI Rookie of the Year (1973) tied with Bob Orton, Jr.
  - PWI ranked him #236 of the top 500 best singles wrestlers during the PWI Years in 2003
  - PWI ranked him #74 of the top 100 tag teams with Rick Martel during the PWI Years in 2003
- Universal Wrestling Association
  - UWA World Junior Heavyweight Championship (1 time)
- World Wide Wrestling Federation / World Wrestling Federation
  - WWWF/WWF World Tag Team Championship (5 times) – with Haystacks Calhoun (1), Dean Ho (1), Larry Zbyszko (1), and Rick Martel (2)
