= Yukon Lumberjacks =

Professional wrestling tag team

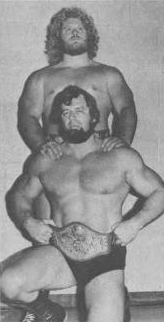
- The Yukon Lumberjacks, Eric (top) and Pierre (bottom), as WWWF Tag Team Champions, circa 1978

Tag team
- Members: Lumberjack Eric; Lumberjack Pierre
- Name: The Yukon Lumberjacks
- Billed heights: Eric: 6 ft 2 in (1.88 m); Pierre: 6 ft 0 in (1.83 m)
- Combined billed weight: 520 lb (240 kg)
- Billed from: Yukon
- Debut: 1978
- Disbanded: 1978
- Years active: 1978

The Yukon Lumberjacks was the name of a professional wrestling tag team who worked in the World Wide Wrestling Federation (WWWF) in 1978, consisting of Eric and Pierre. The team was managed by "Captain" Lou Albano and worked as heels (wrestling term for those who portray the "bad guy"). The team held the WWWF Tag Team Championship for 148 days in 1978.

== History ==
In May 1978, long time World Wide Wrestling Federation (WWWF) manager "Captain" Lou Albano introduced a new team, the "Yukon Lumberjacks", composed of Lumberjack Eric and Lumberjack Pierre. Eric had previously worked as the masked character Super Destroyer as well as under his real name, Scott Irwin. Pierre had previously worked as the "Russian Stomper", but neither had worked for the WWWF before their introduction. The ring characters of Eric and Pierre were that of Canadian lumberjacks, complete with flannel shirts, bushy beards and wild hair. The Lumberjacks worked their way up the tag team ranks quickly starting a storyline with the reigning WWWF Tag Team Champions Dino Bravo and Dominic DeNucci, including several inconclusive championship matches. On June 26, 1978, the Yukon Lumberjacks defeated Bravo and DeNucci to win the championship. As a team they successfully defended the championship against teams such as Bravo and DeNucci, Gorilla Monsoon and S. D. Jones, Haystacks Calhoun and Tony Garea, and Chief Jay Strongbow and Larry Zbyszko, as their reign lasted 148 days. The Lumberjacks lost the championship to Tony Garea and Zbyszko on November 21, 1978.

After losing a rematch the following day, Eric left the WWWF, ending the Yukon Lumberjacks. Lumberjack Pierre remained in the WWWF until early 1979, before he moved to Canada, briefly working as Igor Volkoff before retiring. Eric would wrestle as Scott Irwin and formed the Long Riders with his brother Bill Irwin. Eric died in 1987 at 35 from a brain tumor.

== Championships and accomplishments ==
- World Wide Wrestling Federation

- WWWF Tag Team Championship (1 time)
