= List of World Tag Team Champions (WWE, 1971–2010) =

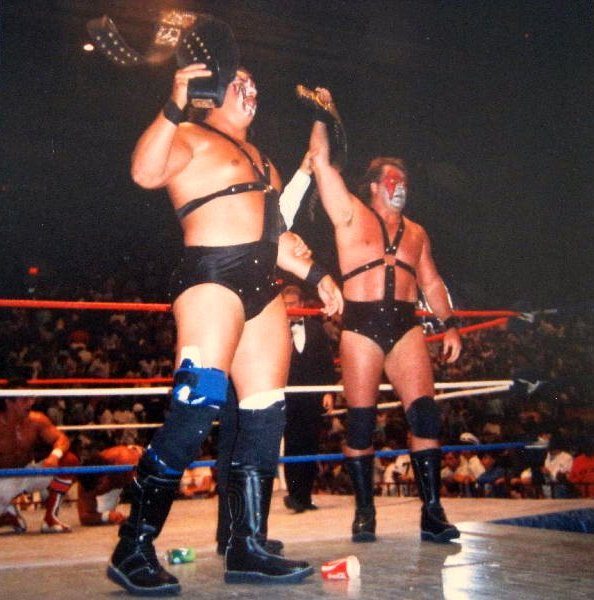
Three-time champions Demolition (Ax and Smash), whose first reign was the longest reign for the title at 478 days

The World Tag Team Championship, originally known as the WWWF World Tag Team Championship, was a professional wrestling world tag team championship in World Wrestling Entertainment (WWE). The title had various names over the years due to company name changes, from its establishment in 1971 in the World Wide Wrestling Federation (WWWF), to World Wrestling Federation (WWF) in 1979, and then WWE in 2002; the championship took on its final unbranded name later that same year. In April 2009, it was unified with the WWE Tag Team Championship, with the two titles together then recognized as the Unified WWE Tag Team Championship while remaining independently active. On August 16, 2010, however, the World Tag Team Championship was decommissioned in favor of continuing the lineage of the WWE Tag Team Championship (which became the Raw Tag Team Championship in 2016 before assuming the name of World Tag Team Championship in 2024).

There were a total of 176 reigns between 113 teams composed of 164 individual champions, and nine vacancies. The first champions were Luke Graham and Tarzan Tyler and the final champions were The Hart Dynasty (David Hart Smith and Tyson Kidd). The team with the most reigns was The Dudley Boyz (Bubba Ray Dudley and D-Von Dudley) with eight, while individually, Edge had the most at 12. Only two tag teams held the title for 365 or more days: Demolition (Ax and Smash), whose first reign was the longest reign for the title at 478 days, and The Valiant Brothers (Jimmy Valiant and Johnny Valiant). As a team, Demolition also had the longest combined reign at 698 days across three reigns, while individually, Mr. Fuji had the longest combined reign at 932 days across five reigns.

The following is a chronological list of teams that have been World Tag Team Champions by ring name.

== Title history ==
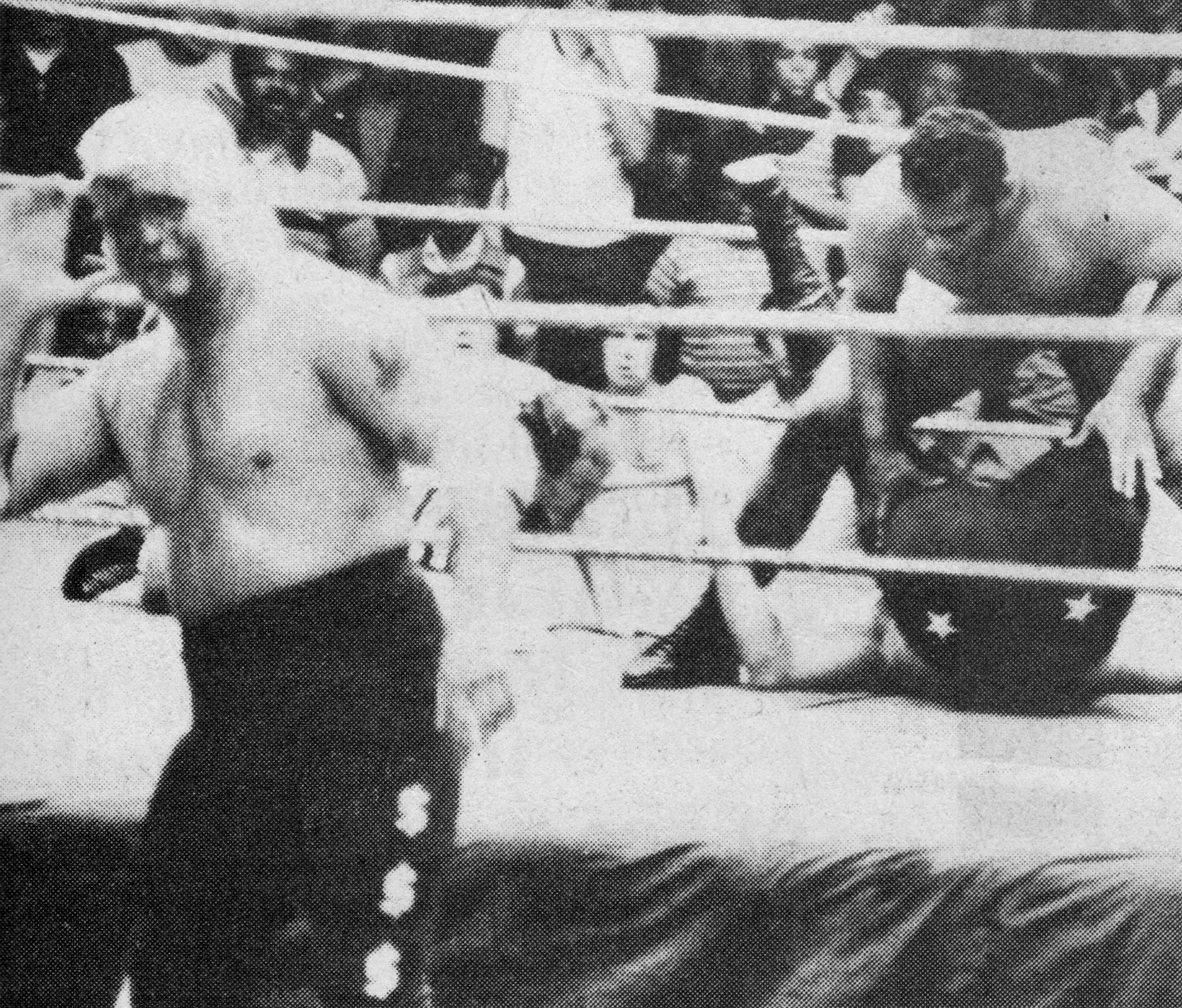
Victor Rivera pins Johnny Valiant to win the third fall and the championship on May 13, 1975

=== Names ===
Name	Years
WWWF World Tag Team Championship	June 3, 1971 – March 1, 1979
WWF World Tag Team Championship	March 1, 1979 – December 26, 1983
WWF Tag Team Championship	December 26, 1983 – May 6, 2002
WWE Tag Team Championship	May 6, 2002 – October 7, 2002
World Tag Team Championship	October 7, 2002 – August 16, 2010
Unified WWE Tag Team Championship (Note: In tandem with the WWE Tag Team Championship.)	April 5, 2009 - August 16, 2010

=== Reigns ===
Key
No.	Overall reign number
Reign	Reign number for the specific team—reign numbers for the individuals are in parentheses, if different
Days	Number of days held
†	Championship change is unrecognized by the promotion
<1	Reign lasted less than a day

No.	Champion	Championship change			Reign statistics		Notes	Ref.
No.	Champion	Date	Event	Location	Reign	Days	Notes	Ref.
National Wrestling Alliance: World Wide Wrestling Federation (WWWF)
1	Luke Graham and Tarzan Tyler	June 3, 1971	House show	New Orleans, LA	1	186	Graham and Tyler defeated Dick the Bruiser and The Sheik in a tournament final. On November 12, Graham and Tyler also won the WWF International Tag Team Championship.	
2	Karl Gotch and Rene Goulet	December 6, 1971	House show	New York, NY	1	57		
3	King Curtis Iaukea and Mikel Scicluna	February 1, 1972	House show	Philadelphia, PA	1	111		
4	Chief Jay Strongbow and Sonny King	May 22, 1972	House show	New York, NY	1	36		
5	Mr. Fuji and Professor Tanaka	June 27, 1972	House show	Philadelphia, PA	1	337	Television taping.	
6	Haystacks Calhoun and Tony Garea	May 30, 1973	House show	Hamburg, PA	1	104	Television taping.	
7	Mr. Fuji and Professor Tanaka	September 11, 1973	House show	Philadelphia, PA	2	64	Television taping.	
8	Dean Ho and Tony Garea	November 14, 1973	House show	Hamburg, PA	1 (1, 2)	175	Television taping.	
9	Valiant Brothers (Jimmy Valiant and Johnny Valiant)	May 8, 1974	House show	Hamburg, PA	1	370	Television taping.	
10	Dominic DeNucci and Victor Rivera/Pat Barrett	May 13, 1975	House show	Philadelphia, PA	1	105 (67/38)	Rivera left the WWWF on July 19, 1975. DeNucci chose Barrett as his replacement partner.	
11	The Blackjacks (Blackjack Lanza and Blackjack Mulligan)	August 26, 1975	House show	Philadelphia, PA	1	84		
12	Louis Cerdan and Tony Parisi	November 18, 1975	House show	Philadelphia, PA	1	175		
13	Executioners (Executioner #1 and Executioner #2)	May 11, 1976	House show	Philadelphia, PA	1	168		
—	Vacated	October 26, 1976	House show	Hamburg, PA	—	—	Executioners were stripped of the championship when a third Executioner was used.	
14	Billy White Wolf and Chief Jay Strongbow	December 7, 1976	House show	Philadelphia, PA	1 (1, 2)	237	This was a three-team tournament, also involving Nikolai Volkoff and Tor Kamata, and Executioners.	
—	Vacated	August 1, 1977	—	—	—	—	The championship was vacated when Billy White Wolf injured his neck in a match against Ken Patera.	
15	Mr. Fuji and Professor Tanaka	September 27, 1977	House show	Philadelphia, PA	3	168	Fuji and Tanaka defeated Tony Garea and Larry Zbyszko in a tournament final to win the vacant championship.	
16	Dino Bravo and Dominic DeNucci	March 14, 1978	Championship Wrestling	Philadelphia, PA	1 (1, 2)	104		
17	The Yukon Lumberjacks (Yukon Eric and Yukon Pierre)	June 26, 1978	House show	New York, NY	1	148		
18	Larry Zbyszko and Tony Garea	November 21, 1978	Championship Wrestling	Allentown, PA	1 (1, 3)	105		
19	Valiant Brothers (Jerry Valiant and Johnny Valiant)	March 6, 1979	Championship Wrestling	Allentown, PA	1 (1, 2)	230		
National Wrestling Alliance: World Wrestling Federation (WWF)
20	Ivan Putski and Tito Santana	October 22, 1979	House show	New York, NY	1	173		
21	The Wild Samoans (Afa and Sika)	April 12, 1980	House show	Philadelphia, PA	1	119		
22	Bob Backlund and Pedro Morales	August 9, 1980	Showdown at Shea	Queens, NY	1	1	This was a two out of three falls match, which Backlund and Morales won 2–0.	
—	Vacated	August 10, 1980	—	—	—	—	The championship was vacated due to Backlund's status as WWF Heavyweight Champion.	
23	The Wild Samoans (Afa and Sika)	September 9, 1980	Championship Wrestling	Allentown, PA	2	60	The Wild Samoans defeated Rene Goulet and Tony Garea in a tournament final to win the vacant championship.	
24	Rick Martel and Tony Garea	November 8, 1980	House show	Philadelphia, PA	1 (1, 4)	129		
25	Moondogs (Moondog Rex and Moondog King/Moondog Spot)	March 17, 1981	Championship Wrestling	Allentown, PA	1	126 (45/81)	King was replaced with Spot on May 1 when he's unable to enter the United States from Canada.	
26	Rick Martel and Tony Garea	July 21, 1981	Championship Wrestling	Allentown, PA	2 (2, 5)	84		
27	Mr. Fuji and Mr. Saito	October 13, 1981	Championship Wrestling	Allentown, PA	1 (4, 1)	258		
28	Chief Jay Strongbow and Jules	June 28, 1982	House show	New York, NY	1 (3, 1)	15		
29	Mr. Fuji and Mr. Saito	July 13, 1982	Championship Wrestling	Allentown, PA	2 (5, 2)	105		
30	Chief Jay Strongbow and Jules	October 26, 1982	Championship Wrestling	Allentown, PA	2 (4, 2)	133		
31	The Wild Samoans (Afa and Sika)	March 8, 1983	Championship Wrestling	Allentown, PA	3	252	Aired on tape delay on March 19, 1983.	
32	Soul Patrol (Rocky Johnson and Tony Atlas)	November 15, 1983	Championship Wrestling	Allentown, PA	1	154	This was a no disqualification match. Aired on tape delay on December 10, 1983.	
World Wrestling Federation (WWF)
33	The North-South Connection (Adrian Adonis and Dick Murdoch)	April 17, 1984	Championship Wrestling	Hamburg, PA	1	279		
34	U.S. Express (Barry Windham and Mike Rotundo)	January 21, 1985	House show	Hartford, CT	1	69		
35	The Iron Sheik and Nikolai Volkoff	March 31, 1985	WrestleMania I	New York, NY	1	78		
36	U.S. Express (Barry Windham and Mike Rotundo)	June 17, 1985	Championship Wrestling	Poughkeepsie, NY	2	68		
37	Dream Team (Brutus Beefcake and Greg Valentine)	August 24, 1985	House show	Philadelphia, PA	1	226		
38	The British Bulldogs (Davey Boy Smith and Dynamite Kid)	April 7, 1986	WrestleMania 2	Rosemont, IL	1	294		
39	Hart Foundation (Bret Hart and Jim Neidhart)	January 26, 1987	Superstars	Tampa, FL	1	274	Referee Danny Davis favoured The Hart Foundation throughout the match and was later banned as a referee by WWF president Jack Tunney.	
40	Strike Force (Rick Martel and Tito Santana)	October 27, 1987	Superstars	Syracuse, NY	1 (3, 2)	152		
41	Demolition (Ax and Smash)	March 27, 1988	WrestleMania IV	Atlantic City, NJ	1	478		
42	The Brain Busters (Arn Anderson and Tully Blanchard)	July 18, 1989	Saturday Night's Main Event XXII	Worcester, MA	1	76	This was a two-out-of-three falls match which the Brain Busters won 2–1. Aired on tape delay on July 29, 1989.	
43	Demolition (Ax and Smash)	October 2, 1989	Superstars	Wheeling, WV	2	72	Aired on tape delay on November 4, 1989.	
44	Colossal Connection (André the Giant and Haku)	December 13, 1989	Superstars	Huntsville, AL	1	109	Aired on tape delay on December 30, 1989	
45	Demolition (Ax, Smash, and Crush)	April 1, 1990	WrestleMania VI	Toronto, ON, Canada	3 (3, 3, 1)	148	Crush joined Demolition during this reign, debuting on the June 6 taping of Superstars; the Freebird Rule is invoked, allowing any two members of Demolition to defend the championship.	
46	Hart Foundation (Bret Hart and Jim Neidhart)	August 27, 1990	SummerSlam	Philadelphia, PA	2	209	This was a two-out-of-three falls match, which the Hart Foundation won 2–1. Crush and Smash defended the championship in this match.	
†	The Rockers (Marty Jannetty and Shawn Michaels)	October 30, 1990	The Main Event IV	Fort Wayne, IN	—	—	The Rockers won the titles in a two-out-of-three falls match and held them for several days, during which they made several defenses. However, WWE decided not to air the title change, returning the titles to The Hart Foundation. The win was never acknowledged.	
47	The Nasty Boys (Brian Knobbs and Jerry Sags)	March 24, 1991	WrestleMania VII	Los Angeles, CA	1	155		
48	Legion of Doom (Animal and Hawk)	August 26, 1991	SummerSlam	New York, NY	1	165	This was a Street Fight	
49	Money Inc. (Irwin R. Schyster and Ted DiBiase)	February 7, 1992	House show	Denver, CO	1 (3, 1)	164	Schyster was previously known as Mike Rotundo.	
50	The Natural Disasters (Earthquake and Typhoon)	July 20, 1992	Superstars of Wrestling	Worcester, MA	1	85		
51	Money Inc. (Irwin R. Schyster and Ted DiBiase)	October 13, 1992	Wrestling Challenge	Regina, SK, Canada	2 (4, 2)	244		
52	The Steiner Brothers (Rick Steiner and Scott Steiner)	June 14, 1993	Wrestling Challenge	Columbus, OH	1	2		
53	Money Inc. (Irwin R. Schyster and Ted DiBiase)	June 16, 1993	House Show	Rockford, IL	3 (5, 3)	3		
54	The Steiner Brothers (Rick Steiner and Scott Steiner)	June 19, 1993	House show	St. Louis, MO	2	86		
55	The Quebecers (Jacques and Pierre)	September 13, 1993	Raw	New York, NY	1	119	This match was held under Province-of-Quebec rules, under which titles could change hands via disqualification. The Quebecers won when the referee saw Scott Steiner hit Jacques with a hockey stick and disqualified them.	
56	The 1–2–3 Kid and Marty Jannetty	January 10, 1994	Raw	Richmond, VA	1	7		
57	The Quebecers (Jacques and Pierre)	January 17, 1994	House show	New York, NY	2	71		
58	Men on a Mission (Mabel and Mo)	March 29, 1994	House show	London, England	1	2		
59	The Quebecers (Jacques and Pierre)	March 31, 1994	House show	Sheffield, England	3	26		
60	Headshrinkers (Fatu and Samu)	April 26, 1994	Raw	Burlington, VT	1	124		
61	Two Dudes with Attitudes (Diesel and Shawn Michaels)	August 28, 1994	House show	Indianapolis, IN	1	87		
—	Vacated	November 23, 1994	Survivor Series	San Antonio, TX	—	—	The championship was vacated when Diesel and Michaels could not function as a tag team.	
62	The 1–2–3 Kid and Bob Holly	January 22, 1995	Royal Rumble	Tampa, FL	1 (2, 1)	1	Holly and Kid defeated Bam Bam Bigelow and Tatanka in a tournament final to win the vacant championship.	
63	Smoking Gunns (Bart Gunn and Billy Gunn)	January 23, 1995	Raw	Palmetto, FL	1	69		
64	Owen Hart and Yokozuna	April 2, 1995	WrestleMania XI	Hartford, CT	1	175		
65	Two Dudes with Attitudes (Diesel and Shawn Michaels)	September 24, 1995	In Your House: Triple Header	Saginaw, MI	2	1	This match was also for Diesel's WWF Championship and Michaels' Intercontinental Championship. However, as Owen Hart failed to show up for the match, the British Bulldog substituted as Yokozuna's partner. During the match, Hart ran down to the ring, only to be pinned, despite not officially being in the match.	
66	Owen Hart and Yokozuna	September 25, 1995	Raw	Grand Rapids, MI	2	<1	Due to the ensuing controversy around the previous title change, the championships were restored to Hart and Yokozuna the following night on Raw.	
67	Smoking Gunns (Bart Gunn and Billy Gunn)	September 25, 1995	Raw	Grand Rapids, MI	2	143		
—	Vacated	February 15, 1996	—	—	—	—	The championship was vacated when Billy Gunn suffered a neck injury.	
68	Bodydonnas (Skip and Zip)	March 31, 1996	WrestleMania XII	Anaheim, CA	1	49	The Bodydonnas defeated The Godwinns in a tournament final to win the vacant championship.	
69	The Godwinns (Henry O. Godwinn and Phineas I. Godwinn)	May 19, 1996	House show	New York, NY	1	7		
70	Smoking Gunns (Bart Gunn and Billy Gunn)	May 26, 1996	In Your House: Beware of Dog	Florence, SC	3	119		
71	Owen Hart and The British Bulldog	September 22, 1996	In Your House: Mind Games	Philadelphia, PA	1 (3, 2)	246		
72	"Stone Cold" Steve Austin and Shawn Michaels	May 26, 1997	Raw is War	Evansville, IN	1 (1, 3)	49		
—	Vacated	July 14, 1997	Raw is War	San Antonio, TX	—	—	The championship was vacated when Michaels was suspended after a backstage fight with Bret Hart on June 9, 1997.	
73	Dude Love and "Stone Cold" Steve Austin	July 14, 1997	Raw Is War	San Antonio, TX	1 (1, 2)	55	Austin and Love defeated The British Bulldog and Owen Hart, who had won a tournament to face Austin and a partner of his choosing. Austin also won the Intercontinental Championship during this reign.	
—	Vacated	September 7, 1997	Ground Zero: In Your House	Louisville, KY	—	—	The championship was vacated when Stone Cold Steve Austin suffered a neck injury.	
74	The Headbangers (Mosh and Thrasher)	September 7, 1997	Ground Zero: In Your House	Louisville, KY	1	28	This was a four-way elimination match also involving The Godwinns, The Legion of Doom and the British Bulldog and Owen Hart.	
75	The Godwinns (Henry O. Godwinn and Phineas I. Godwinn)	October 5, 1997	Badd Blood: In Your House	St. Louis, MO	2	2		
76	Legion of Doom (Animal and Hawk)	October 7, 1997	Raw Is War	Topeka, KS	2	48	Aired on tape delay October 13, 1997.	
77	The New Age Outlaws (Billy Gunn and Road Dogg)	November 24, 1997	Raw Is War	Fayetteville, NC	1 (4, 1)	125		
78	Cactus Jack and Chainsaw Charlie	March 29, 1998	WrestleMania XIV	Boston, MA	1 (2, 1)	1	This was a dumpster match.	
—	Vacated	March 30, 1998	Raw Is War	Albany, NY	—	—	Held up on account of the wrong dumpster being used.	
79	The New Age Outlaws (Billy Gunn and Road Dogg)	March 30, 1998	Raw Is War	Albany, NY	2 (5, 2)	105	This was a steel cage match.	
80	Kane and Mankind	July 13, 1998	Raw Is War	East Rutherford, NJ	1 (1, 3)	13		
81	"Stone Cold" Steve Austin and The Undertaker	July 26, 1998	Fully Loaded: In Your House	Fresno, CA	1 (3, 1)	15		
82	Kane and Mankind	August 10, 1998	Raw Is War	Omaha, NE	2 (2, 4)	20	This was a four-way tag team match also involving The New Age Outlaws and D'Lo Brown and The Rock.	
83	The New Age Outlaws (Billy Gunn and Road Dogg)	August 30, 1998	SummerSlam	New York, NY	3 (6, 3)	106	This was a falls count anywhere match. Mankind wrestled this match alone, being abandoned by Kane.	
84	The Corporation (The Big Boss Man and Ken Shamrock)	December 14, 1998	Raw Is War	Tacoma, WA	1	42		
85	Jeff Jarrett and Owen Hart	January 25, 1999	Raw Is War	Phoenix, AZ	1 (1, 4)	64		
86	Kane and X-Pac	March 30, 1999	Raw Is War	Uniondale, NY	1 (3, 3)	56	Aired on tape delay April 5, 1999. X-Pac was previously known as 1-2-3 Kid.	
87	The Acolytes (Bradshaw and Faarooq)	May 25, 1999	Raw Is War	Moline, IL	1	35	Aired on tape delay May 31, 1999. On June 21, 1999, "Mr. Ass" Billy Gunn stole Bradshaw's title belt and claimed that it was his after scoring the pin during a 6-man tag title match, in which he fought alongside the Acolytes. A week later, Bradshaw reclaimed the belt in a one-on-one match where he defeated Gunn and took his belt back.	
88	The Hardy Boyz (Jeff Hardy and Matt Hardy)	June 29, 1999	Raw Is War	Fayetteville, NC	1	26	Aired on tape delay July 5, 1999.	
89	The Acolytes (Bradshaw and Faarooq)	July 25, 1999	Fully Loaded	Buffalo, NY	2	15	This was a handicap match in which Michael Hayes teamed with The Hardy Boyz.	
90	Kane and X-Pac	August 9, 1999	Raw Is War	Rosemont, IL	2 (4, 4)	13		
91	The Unholy Alliance (Big Show and The Undertaker)	August 22, 1999	SummerSlam	Minneapolis, MN	1 (1, 2)	8		
92	Rock 'n' Sock Connection (Mankind and The Rock)	August 30, 1999	Raw Is War	Boston, MA	1 (5, 1)	8		
93	The Unholy Alliance (Big Show and The Undertaker)	September 7, 1999	SmackDown!	Albany, NY	2 (2, 3)	13	This was a Buried Alive match, aired on tape delay on September 9, 1999.	
94	Rock 'n' Sock Connection (Mankind and The Rock)	September 20, 1999	Raw Is War	Houston, TX	2 (6, 2)	1	This match was contested under "Dark Side Rules", meaning all members of the Ministry of Darkness (Big Show, Mideon, Undertaker and Viscera) were legal in the match. However, Undertaker was on commentary the entire match. Rock pinned Mideon to win the championship.	
95	The New Age Outlaws (Billy Gunn and Road Dogg)	September 21, 1999	SmackDown!	Dallas, TX	4 (7, 4)	21	Aired on tape delay on September 23, 1999.	
96	Rock 'n' Sock Connection (Mankind and The Rock)	October 12, 1999	SmackDown!	Birmingham, AL	3 (7, 3)	6	Aired on tape delay on October 14, 1999.	
97	The Holly Cousins (Crash Holly and Hardcore Holly)	October 18, 1999	Raw Is War	Columbus, OH	1 (1, 2)	15		
98	Al Snow and Mankind	November 2, 1999	SmackDown!	Philadelphia, PA	1 (1, 8)	6	Aired on tape delay on November 4, 1999.	
99	The New Age Outlaws (Billy Gunn and Road Dogg)	November 8, 1999	Raw Is War	State College, PA	5 (8, 5)	111		
100	Dudley Boyz (Bubba Ray Dudley and D-Von Dudley)	February 27, 2000	No Way Out	Hartford, CT	1	35		
101	Edge and Christian	April 2, 2000	WrestleMania 2000	Anaheim, CA	1	57	This was a Triangle ladder match also involving The Hardy Boyz.	
102	Too Cool (Grand Master Sexay and Scotty 2 Hotty)	May 29, 2000	Raw Is War	Vancouver, BC, Canada	1	27		
103	Edge and Christian	June 25, 2000	King of the Ring	Boston, MA	2	91	This was a four-way tag team elimination match, also involving The Hardy Boyz and T & A (Test and Albert).	
104	The Hardy Boyz (Jeff Hardy and Matt Hardy)	September 24, 2000	Unforgiven	Philadelphia, PA	2	28	This was a steel cage match.	
105	Edge and Christian	October 22, 2000	No Mercy	Albany, NY	3	1	Christian and Edge wrestled this match as Los Conquistadores, due to the fact that they were banned from challenging The Hardy Boyz (Jeff Hardy and Matt Hardy) for the championship.	
106	The Hardy Boyz (Jeff Hardy and Matt Hardy)	October 23, 2000	Raw Is War	Hartford, CT	3	14	The Hardy Boyz wrestled as Los Conquistadores. Edge defended the titles alone due to Christian being attacked prior to the match.	
107	The Right to Censor (Bull Buchanan and The Goodfather)	November 6, 2000	Raw Is War	Houston, TX	1	34		
108	Edge and Christian	December 10, 2000	Armageddon	Birmingham, AL	4	8	This was a four-way tag team match, also involving Road Dogg and K-Kwik, and The Dudley Boyz, who Edge and Christian pinned.	
109	The Rock and The Undertaker	December 18, 2000	Raw Is War	Greenville, SC	1 (4, 4)	1		
110	Edge and Christian	December 19, 2000	SmackDown!	Charlotte, NC	5	33	Kurt Angle was the special guest referee. Aired on tape delay on December 21, 2000.	
111	Dudley Boyz (Bubba Ray Dudley and D-Von Dudley)	January 21, 2001	Royal Rumble	New Orleans, LA	2	43		
112	The Hardy Boyz (Jeff Hardy and Matt Hardy)	March 5, 2001	Raw Is War	Washington, D.C.	4	14		
113	Edge and Christian	March 19, 2001	Raw Is War	Albany, NY	6	<1	This title shot was originally reserved for The Dudley Boyz, but Edge and Christian claimed that they had not arrived at the arena, and so took the shot themselves.	
114	Dudley Boyz (Bubba Ray Dudley and D-Von Dudley)	March 19, 2001	Raw Is War	Albany, NY	3	13	After Edge and Christian won the titles, the Dudley Boyz demanded their title shot, which they received.	
115	Edge and Christian	April 1, 2001	WrestleMania X-Seven	Houston, TX	7	16	This was a Tables, Ladders, and Chairs match also involving The Hardy Boyz.	
116	Brothers of Destruction (Kane and The Undertaker)	April 17, 2001	SmackDown!	Nashville, TN	1 (5, 5)	12	Aired on tape delay on April 19, 2001.	
117	The Two-Man Power Trip ("Stone Cold" Steve Austin and Triple H)	April 29, 2001	Backlash	Rosemont, IL	1 (4, 1)	22	This match was also for Austin's WWF Championship and Triple H's Intercontinental Championship.	
118	Chris Jericho and Chris Benoit	May 21, 2001	Raw Is War	San Jose, CA	1	29		
119	Dudley Boyz (Bubba Ray Dudley and D-Von Dudley)	June 19, 2001	SmackDown!	Orlando, FL	4	20	Aired on tape delay on June 21, 2001.	
120	The Acolytes Protection Agency (Bradshaw and Faarooq)	July 9, 2001	Raw Is War	Atlanta, GA	3	29	Previously known as "The Acolytes".	
121	Diamond Dallas Page and Kanyon	August 7, 2001	SmackDown!	Los Angeles, CA	1	12	Aired on August 9, 2001.	
122	Brothers of Destruction (The Undertaker and Kane)	August 19, 2001	SummerSlam	San Jose, CA	2 (6, 6)	29	This was a steel cage match. Kane and Undertaker also successfully defended their WCW Tag Team Championship. Both titles were independently active during this reign.	
123	Dudley Boyz (Bubba Ray Dudley and D-Von Dudley)	September 17, 2001	Raw is War	Nashville, TN	5	35		
124	Chris Jericho and The Rock	October 22, 2001	Raw	Kansas City, MO	1 (2, 5)	8	During their reign, Jericho was the WCW Champion.	
125	Booker T and Test	October 30, 2001	SmackDown!	Cincinnati, OH	1	13	Aired November 1, 2001.	
126	The Hardy Boyz (Matt Hardy and Jeff Hardy)	November 12, 2001	Raw	Boston, MA	5	6		
127	Dudley Boyz (Bubba Ray Dudley and D-Von Dudley)	November 18, 2001	Survivor Series	Greensboro, NC	6	50	This was a steel cage match to unify the WWF and WCW Tag Team Championships. The WCW Tag Team Championship was subsequently retired.	
128	Spike Dudley and Tazz	January 7, 2002	Raw	New York, NY	1	43	This was a hardcore match.	
129	Billy and Chuck	February 19, 2002	SmackDown!	Rockford, IL	1 (9, 1)	89	Aired February 21, 2002. Titles became SmackDown! exclusive due to the brand split after Billy and Chuck were drafted to SmackDown! on March 25, 2002. During their reign, the titles were renamed the WWE Tag Team Championship	
World Wrestling Entertainment (WWE): SmackDown
130	Rico and Rikishi	May 19, 2002	Judgment Day	Nashville, TN	1 (1, 2)	16	Rikishi was previously known as Fatu.	
131	Billy and Chuck	June 4, 2002	SmackDown!	Oklahoma City, OK	2 (10, 2)	28	This was an elimination match, aired June 6, 2002.	
132	Edge and Hollywood Hulk Hogan	July 2, 2002	SmackDown!	Boston, MA	1 (8, 1)	19	Aired July 4, 2002.	
133	The Un-Americans (Christian and Lance Storm)	July 21, 2002	Vengeance	Detroit, MI	1 (8, 1)	64	Titles became exclusive to Raw after the Un-Americans chose to sign with Raw.	
WWE: Raw
134	Hurri-Kane (The Hurricane and Kane)	September 23, 2002	Raw	Anaheim, CA	1 (1, 7)	21	Titles were renamed to World Tag Team Championship.	
135	Christian and Chris Jericho	October 14, 2002	Raw	Montreal, QC, Canada	1 (9, 3)	62		
136	Booker T and Goldust	December 15, 2002	Armageddon	Sunrise, FL	1 (2, 1)	22	This was a four-way elimination match also involving The Dudley Boyz, and William Regal and Lance Storm.	
137	William Regal and Lance Storm	January 6, 2003	Raw	Phoenix, AZ	1 (1, 2)	13		
138	Dudley Boyz (Bubba Ray Dudley and D-Von Dudley)	January 19, 2003	Royal Rumble	Boston, MA	7	1		
139	William Regal and Lance Storm	January 20, 2003	Raw	Providence, RI	2 (2, 3)	63		
—	Vacated	March 24, 2003	Raw	Sacramento, CA	—	—	Vacated due to Regal suffering from a heart parasite and concussion.	
140	Chief Morley and Lance Storm	March 24, 2003	Raw	Sacramento, CA	1 (1, 4)	7	Morley awarded himself and Storm the titles.	
141	Kane and Rob Van Dam	March 31, 2003	Raw	Seattle, WA	1 (8, 1)	76	This was a three-way elimination match also involving The Dudley Boyz.	
142	La Résistance (René Duprée and Sylvain Grenier)	June 15, 2003	Bad Blood	Houston, TX	1	98		
143	Dudley Boyz (Bubba Ray Dudley and D-Von Dudley)	September 21, 2003	Unforgiven	Hershey, PA	8	84	This was a handicap tables match in which Robért Conway teamed with La Résistance.	
144	Evolution (Batista and Ric Flair)	December 14, 2003	Armageddon	Orlando, FL	1	64	This was a tag team turmoil match also involving Robért Conway and René Duprée, Hurricane and Rosey, Mark Jindrak and Garrison Cade, Val Venis and Lance Storm and Test and Scott Steiner. Batista and Flair defeated The Dudley Boyz to win.	
145	Booker T and Rob Van Dam	February 16, 2004	Raw	Bakersfield, CA	1 (3, 2)	35		
146	Evolution (Batista and Ric Flair)	March 22, 2004	Raw	Detroit, MI	2	28		
147	Chris Benoit and Edge	April 19, 2004	Raw	Calgary, AB, Canada	1 (2, 9)	42		
148	La Résistance (Robért Conway and Sylvain Grenier)	May 31, 2004	Raw	Montreal, QC, Canada	1 (1, 2)	141		
149	Chris Benoit and Edge	October 19, 2004	Taboo Tuesday	Milwaukee, WI	2 (3, 10)	13	Benoit and Edge were voted into this match as a result of neither winning the World Heavyweight Championship voting. Benoit won the title himself after Edge abandoned him midway through the match.	
150	La Résistance (Robért Conway and Sylvain Grenier)	November 1, 2004	Raw	Peoria, IL	2 (2, 3)	14		
151	Eugene and William Regal	November 15, 2004	Raw	Indianapolis, IN	1 (1, 3)	62	This was a three-way elimination match also involving Rhyno and Tajiri.	
152	La Résistance (Robért Conway and Sylvain Grenier)	January 16, 2005	House show	Winnipeg, MB, Canada	3 (3, 4)	19	Jonathan Coachman replaced Eugene in this match due to injury.	
153	William Regal and Tajiri	February 4, 2005	Raw	Saitama, Japan	1 (4, 1)	86	Aired February 7, 2005.	
154	The Hurricane and Rosey	May 1, 2005	Backlash	Manchester, NH	1 (2, 1)	140	This was a tag team turmoil match also involving The Heart Throbs, Simon Dean and Maven and Robért Conway and Sylvain Grenier. Hurricane and Rosey defeated Conway and Grenier to win the match.	
155	Lance Cade and Trevor Murdoch	September 18, 2005	Unforgiven	Oklahoma City, OK	1	44		
156	Kane and Big Show	November 1, 2005	Taboo Tuesday	San Diego, CA	1 (9, 3)	153	Big Show and Kane were voted into this match as a result of neither winning the WWE Championship voting.	
157	The Spirit Squad (Johnny, Kenny, Mikey, Mitch, and Nicky)	April 3, 2006	Raw	Rosemont, IL	1	216	Kenny and Mikey won the match, but all five members were recognized as champions under the Freebird Rule.	
158	Ric Flair and Roddy Piper	November 5, 2006	Cyber Sunday	Cincinnati, OH	1 (3, 1)	8	Piper was voted into this match via web poll. Kenny and Mikey defended the titles in this match.	
159	Rated-RKO (Edge and Randy Orton)	November 13, 2006	Raw	Manchester, England	1 (11, 1)	77		
160	John Cena and Shawn Michaels	January 29, 2007	Raw	Dallas, TX	1 (1, 4)	63		
161	The Hardy Boyz (Matt Hardy and Jeff Hardy)	April 2, 2007	Raw	Dayton, OH	6	63	The Hardys won a tag team battle royal, last eliminating Lance Cade and Trevor Murdoch; the other participants were Michaels and Cena, Val Venis and Viscera, Johnny Nitro and The Miz, Paul London and Brian Kendrick, Tommy Dreamer and The Sandman, Marcus Cor Von and Kevin Thorn, Chavo Guerrero Jr. and Gregory Helms, and William Regal and Dave Taylor. During their reign, Matt Hardy was a member of the SmackDown roster.	
162	Lance Cade and Trevor Murdoch	June 4, 2007	Raw	Tampa, FL	2	93		
163	Paul London and Brian Kendrick	September 5, 2007	House show	Cape Town, South Africa	1	3		
164	Lance Cade and Trevor Murdoch	September 8, 2007	House show	Johannesburg, South Africa	3	93		
165	Hardcore Holly and Cody Rhodes	December 10, 2007	Raw 15th Anniversary	Bridgeport, CT	1 (3, 1)	202		
166	Ted DiBiase Jr. and Cody Rhodes	June 29, 2008	Night of Champions	Dallas, TX	1 (1, 2)	36	Rhodes was revealed to be DiBiase's mystery partner and turned on Holly, resulting in a handicap match.	
167	Batista and John Cena	August 4, 2008	Raw	Knoxville, TN	1 (3, 2)	7		
168	Ted DiBiase Jr. and Cody Rhodes	August 11, 2008	Raw	Richmond, VA	2 (2, 3)	77		
169	CM Punk and Kofi Kingston	October 27, 2008	Raw	Tucson, AZ	1	47		
170	John Morrison and The Miz	December 13, 2008	House show	Hamilton, ON, Canada	1	113		
171	The Colóns (Carlito and Primo)	April 5, 2009	WrestleMania 25	Houston, TX	1	84	This was a Lumberjack match to unify the World Tag Team and WWE Tag Team Championships. The titles became known as the Unified WWE Tag Team Championship, but remained independently active.	
WWE (unbranded)
172	Edge and Chris Jericho	June 28, 2009	The Bash	Sacramento, CA	1 (12, 4)	28	This was a triple threat match also involving The Legacy (Cody Rhodes and Ted DiBiase Jr.).	
173	Jeri-Show (Chris Jericho and Big Show)	July 26, 2009	Night of Champions	Philadelphia, PA	1 (5, 4)	140	Shortly after winning the titles, Edge suffered a torn Achilles tendon, which required surgery and forced him to vacate his half of the championship. Jericho was allowed to keep his title and choose a new partner; he chose Big Show at Night of Champions. WWE recognizes this as a second reign for Jericho.	
174	D-Generation X (Triple H and Shawn Michaels)	December 13, 2009	TLC: Tables, Ladders & Chairs	San Antonio, TX	1 (2, 5)	57	This was a Tables, Ladders, and Chairs match.	
175	ShoMiz (Big Show and The Miz)	February 8, 2010	Raw	Lafayette, LA	1 (5, 2)	77	This was a Triple Threat Elimination match also involving The Straight Edge Society (CM Punk and Luke Gallows).	
176	The Hart Dynasty (David Hart Smith and Tyson Kidd)	April 26, 2010	Raw	Richmond, VA	1	112	The World Tag Team Championship was deactivated during their reign on August 16, 2010.	
—	Deactivated	August 16, 2010	Raw	Los Angeles, CA	—	—	Decommissioned in favor of continuing the WWE Tag Team Championship lineage.	

== Combined reigns ==
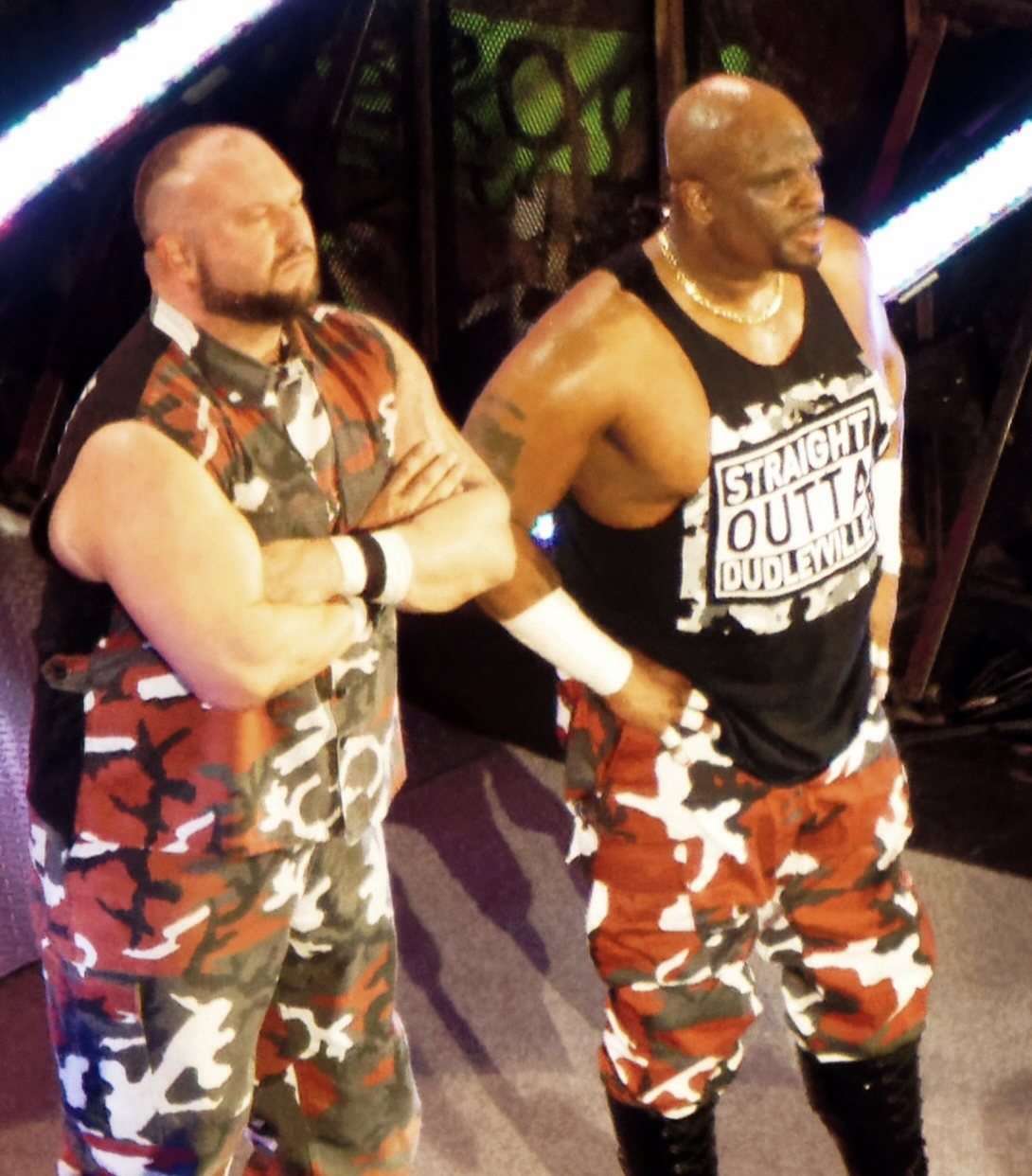
The Dudley Boyz, who hold the most reigns as a team with 8

=== By team ===
Rank	Team	No. of reigns	Combined days
1	Demolition (Ax and Smash)	3	698^{1}
2	Mr. Fuji and Professor Tanaka	3	569
3	Hart Foundation (Bret Hart and Jim Neidhart)	2	483
4	The New Age Outlaws (Billy Gunn and Road Dogg)	5	468
5	The Wild Samoans (Afa and Sika)	3	431
6	Money Inc. (Ted DiBiase and I.R.S.)	3	411
7	Valiant Brothers (Jimmy Valiant and Johnny Valiant)	1	370
8	Mr. Fuji and Mr. Saito	2	363
9	Smoking Gunns (Billy Gunn and Bart Gunn)	3	331
10	The British Bulldogs (Dynamite Kid and Davey Boy Smith)	1	294
11	Dudley Boyz (Bubba Ray Dudley and D-Von Dudley)	8	281
12	Adrian Adonis and Dick Murdoch	1	279
13	Owen Hart and The British Bulldog	1	246
14	Chief Jay Strongbow and Billy White Wolf	1	237
15	Lance Cade and Trevor Murdoch	3	230
15	Valiant Brothers (Johnny Valiant and Jerry Valiant)	1	230
17	Brutus Beefcake and Greg Valentine	1	226
18	The Quebecers (Pierre and Jacques)	3	216
18	The Spirit Squad (Johnny, Kenny, Mikey, Mitch and Nicky)	1	216
20	Tony Garea and Rick Martel	2	213
20	Legion of Doom (Animal and Hawk)	2	213
22	Edge and Christian	7	206
23	Hardcore Holly and Cody Rhodes	1	202
24	Luke Graham and Tarzan Tyler	1	186
25	Tony Parisi and Louis Cerdan	1	185
26	Tony Garea and Dean Ho	1	175
26	Owen Hart and Yokozuna	2	175
28	La Résistance (Robért Conway and Sylvain Grenier)	3	174
29	Ivan Putski and Tito Santana	1	173
30	Executioners (Executioner #1 and Executioner #2)	1	168
31	The Nasty Boys (Brian Knobbs and Jerry Sags)	1	155
32	Tony Atlas and Rocky Johnson	1	154
33	Kane and Big Show	1	153
34	Strike Force (Rick Martel and Tito Santana)	1	152
35	The Hardy Boyz (Matt Hardy and Jeff Hardy)	6	151
36	The Yukon Lumberjacks (Eric and Pierre)	1	148
36	Jules Strongbow and Chief Jay Strongbow	2	148
38	The Hurricane and Rosey	1	140
38	Jeri-Show (Chris Jericho and Big Show)	1	140
40	U.S. Express (Mike Rotundo and Barry Windham)	2	137
41	Headshrinkers (Fatu and Samu)	1	124
42	Billy and Chuck	2	117
43	Cody Rhodes and Ted DiBiase Jr.	2	113
43	John Morrison and The Miz	1	113
45	The Hart Dynasty (David Hart Smith and Tyson Kidd)	1	112
46	King Curtis Iaukea and Mikel Scicluna	1	111
47	Colossal Connection (André the Giant and Haku)	1	109
48	Tony Garea and Larry Zbyszko	1	105
49	Haystacks Calhoun and Tony Garea	1	104
49	Dino Bravo and Dominic DeNucci	1	104
51	La Résistance (René Duprée and Sylvain Grenier)	1	98
52	Evolution (Batista and Ric Flair)	2	92
53	The Steiner Brothers (Rick Steiner and Scott Steiner)	2	88
53	Two Dudes with Attitude (Shawn Michaels and Diesel)	2	88
55	William Regal and Tajiri	1	86
56	The Natural Disasters (Earthquake and Typhoon)	1	85
57	The Colóns (Carlito and Primo)	1	84
58	Moondogs (Moondog Rex and Moondog Spot)	1	81
59	The Acolytes/APA (Bradshaw and Faarooq)	3	79
60	The Iron Sheik and Nikolai Volkoff	1	78
61	Rated-RKO (Edge and Randy Orton)	1	77
61	ShoMiz (Big Show and The Miz)	1	77
63	The Brain Busters (Arn Anderson and Tully Blanchard)	1	76
63	William Regal and Lance Storm	2	76
63	Kane and Rob Van Dam	1	76
66	The Blackjacks (Blackjack Lanza and Blackjack Mulligan)	1	74
67	Kane and X-Pac	2	69
68	Dominic DeNucci and Victor Rivera	1	67
69	Jeff Jarrett and Owen Hart	1	64
69	The Un-Americans (Christian and Lance Storm)	1	64
71	Shawn Michaels and John Cena	1	63
72	Christian and Chris Jericho	1	62
72	Eugene and William Regal	1	62
74	Karl Gotch and Rene Goulet	1	57
74	D-Generation X (Triple H and Shawn Michaels)	1	57
76	"Stone Cold" Steve Austin and Dude Love	1	55
76	Chris Benoit and Edge	2	55
78	Bodydonnas (Skip and Zip)	1	49
78	"Stone Cold" Steve Austin and Shawn Michaels	1	49
80	CM Punk and Kofi Kingston	1	47
81	Moondogs (Moondog Rex and Moondog King)	1	45
82	Spike Dudley and Tazz	1	43
83	The Corporation (The Big Boss Man and Ken Shamrock)	1	42
84	Brothers of Destruction (The Undertaker and Kane)	2	41
85	Dominic DeNucci and Pat Barrett	1	38
86	Sonny King and Chief Jay Strongbow	1	36
87	Booker T and Rob Van Dam	1	35
88	The Right to Censor (Bull Buchanan and The Goodfather)	1	34
89	Kane and Mankind	2	33
90	Chris Benoit and Chris Jericho	1	29
91	The Headbangers (Mosh and Thrasher)	1	28
91	Chris Jericho and Edge	1	28
93	Too Cool (Grand Master Sexay and Scotty 2 Hotty)	1	27
94	The Two-Man Power Trip ("Stone Cold" Steve Austin and Triple H)	1	22
94	Booker T and Goldust	1	22
96	The Unholy Alliance (Big Show and The Undertaker)	2	21
96	Hurri-Kane (The Hurricane and Kane)	1	21
98	Edge and Hollywood Hulk Hogan	1	19
99	Rico and Rikishi	1	16
100	"Stone Cold" Steve Austin and The Undertaker	1	15
100	Rock 'n' Sock Connection (Mankind and The Rock)	3	15
100	The Holly Cousins (Crash Holly and Hardcore Holly)	1	15
103	Booker T and Test	1	13
104	Diamond Dallas Page and Kanyon	1	12
105	The Godwinns (Henry O. Godwinn and Phineas I. Godwinn)	2	9
106	Chris Jericho and The Rock	1	8
106	Ric Flair and Roddy Piper	1	8
108	The 1-2-3 Kid and Marty Jannetty	1	7
108	Chief Morley and Lance Storm	1	7
108	John Cena and Batista	1	7
111	Mankind and Al Snow	1	6
112	Paul London and Brian Kendrick	1	3
113	Men on a Mission (Mabel and Mo)	1	2
114	Bob Backlund and Pedro Morales	1	1
114	The 1-2-3 Kid and Bob Holly	1	1
114	Cactus Jack and Chainsaw Charlie	1	1
114	The Rock and The Undertaker	1	1

^{1} During Demolition's third reign, Crush was added to the team, and the three of them defended the titles under the Freebird Rule for approximately 90 days.

=== By wrestler ===
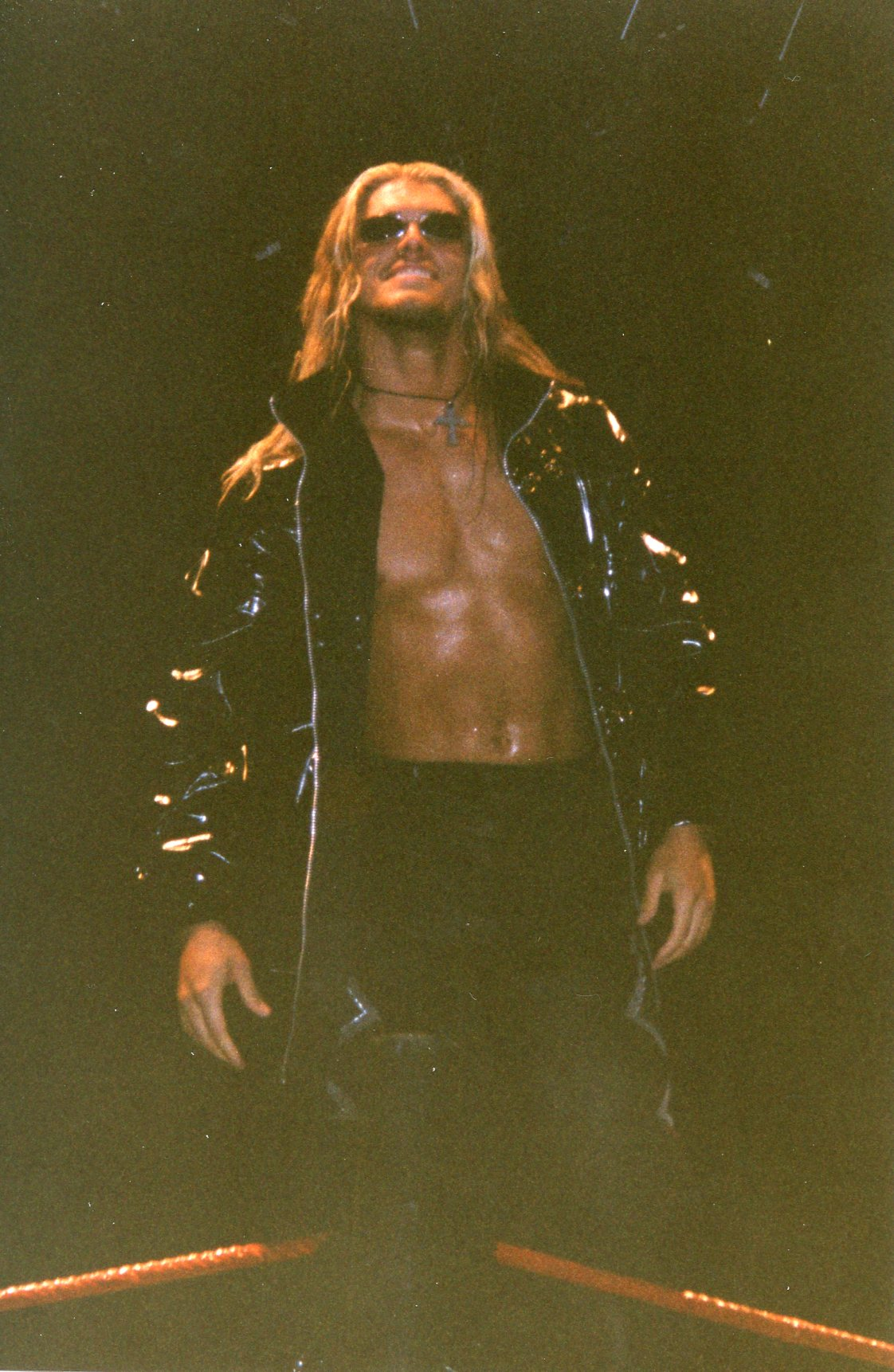
Edge, who holds the record for most World Tag Team Championship reigns with 12 (with five different partners)

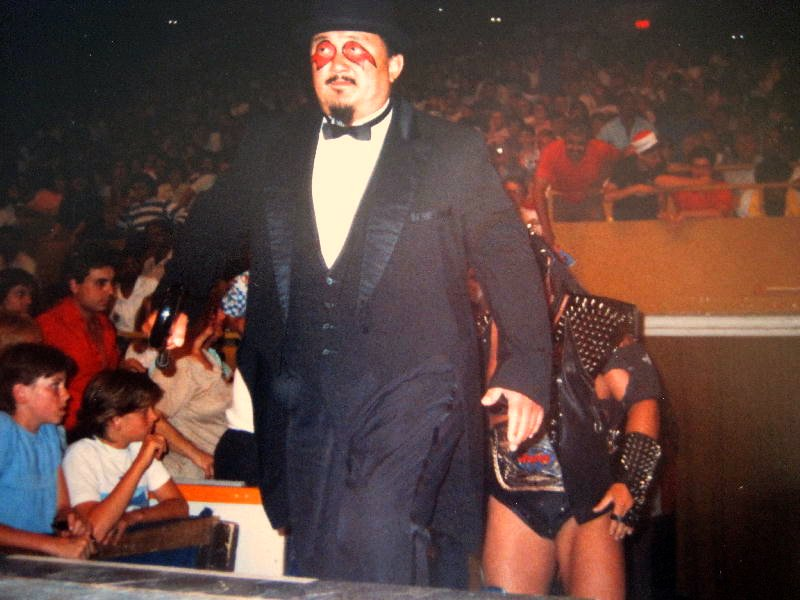
Five-time champion Mr. Fuji, who is the longest combined-reigning champion at 932 days

Rank	Wrestler	No. of reigns	Combined days
1	Mr. Fuji	5	932
2	Billy Gunn/Billy	10	916
3	Ax	3	698
3	Smash	3	698
5	Johnny Valiant	2	600
6	Tony Garea	5	597
7	Professor Tanaka	3	569
8	Mike Rotundo/I.R.S.	5	548
9	Davey Boy Smith/The British Bulldog	2	540
10	Owen Hart	4	485
11	Bret Hart	2	483
11	Jim Neidhart	2	483
13	Road Dogg	5	468
14	Afa	3	431
14	Sika	3	431
16	Chief Jay Strongbow	4	421
17	Ted DiBiase	3	411
18	Kane	9	393
19	Big Show	5	391
20	Edge	12	385
21	Jimmy Valiant	1	370
22	Rick Martel	3	365
23	Mr. Saito	2	363
24	Christian	9	332
25	Bart Gunn	3	331
26	Tito Santana	2	325
27	Cody Rhodes	3	315
28	Dynamite Kid	1	294
29	Bubba Ray Dudley	8	281
29	D-Von Dudley	8	281
31	Adrian Adonis	1	279
31	Dick Murdoch	1	279
33	Sylvain Grenier	4	272
34	Chris Jericho	5	267
35	Shawn Michaels	5	257
36	Billy White Wolf	1	237
37	Jerry Valiant	1	230
37	Trevor Murdoch	3	230
37	Lance Cade	3	230
40	Brutus Beefcake	1	226
40	Greg Valentine	1	226
42	William Regal	4	224
43	Bob Holly/Hardcore Holly	3	218
44	Pierre	3	216
44	Jacques	3	216
44	Johnny	1	216
44	Kenny	1	216
44	Mikey	1	216
44	Mitch	1	216
44	Nicky	1	216
51	Animal	2	213
51	Hawk	2	213
53	Dominic DeNucci	2	209
54	The Miz	2	190
55	Luke Graham	1	186
55	Tarzan Tyler	1	186
57	Louis Cerdan	1	185
57	Tony Parisi	1	185
59	Yokozuna	2	175
59	Dean Ho	1	175
61	Robért Conway	3	174
62	Ivan Putski	1	173
63	Executioner #1	1	168
63	Executioner #2	1	168
65	The Hurricane	2	161
66	Brian Knobbs	1	155
66	Jerry Sags	1	155
68	Tony Atlas	1	154
68	Rocky Johnson	1	154
70	Matt Hardy	6	151
70	Jeff Hardy	6	151
72	Yukon Pierre	1	148
72	Eric	1	148
72	Jules Strongbow	2	148
72	Crush	1	148
76	Lance Storm	4	147
77	"Stone Cold" Steve Austin	4	141
78	Rosey	1	140
78	Fatu/Rikishi	2	140
80	Barry Windham	2	137
81	Rex	1	126
82	Samu	1	124
83	Chuck	2	117
84	Ted DiBiase (Jr.)	2	113
84	John Morrison	1	113
86	David Hart Smith	1	112
86	Tyson Kidd	1	112
88	King Curtis Iaukea	1	111
88	Mikel Scicluna	1	111
88	Rob Van Dam	2	111
91	Dude Love/Cactus Jack/Mankind	8	110
92	André the Giant	1	109
92	Haku	1	109
94	Larry Zbyszko	1	105
95	Haystacks Calhoun	1	104
95	Dino Bravo	1	104
97	Ric Flair	3	100
98	Batista	3	99
99	René Duprée	1	98
100	Rick Steiner	2	88
100	Scott Steiner	2	88
100	Diesel	2	88
103	Tajiri	1	86
104	Earthquake	1	85
104	Typhoon	1	85
106	Chris Benoit	3	84
106	Carlito	1	84
106	Primo	1	84
109	Moondog Spot	1	81
110	Bradshaw	3	79
110	Faarooq	3	79
110	Triple H	2	79
113	The Iron Sheik	1	78
113	Nikolai Volkoff	1	78
113	The Undertaker	6	78
116	The 1-2-3 Kid/X-Pac	4	77
116	Randy Orton	1	77
118	Arn Anderson	1	76
118	Tully Blanchard	1	76
120	Blackjack Mulligan	1	74
120	Blackjack Lanza	1	74
122	Booker T	3	70
122	John Cena	2	70
124	Victor Rivera	1	67
125	Jeff Jarrett	1	64
126	Eugene	1	62
127	Karl Gotch	1	57
127	Rene Goulet	1	57
129	Skip	1	49
129	Zip	1	49
131	CM Punk	1	47
131	Kofi Kingston	1	47
133	Moondog King	1	45
134	Spike Dudley	1	43
134	Tazz	1	43
136	The Big Boss Man	1	42
136	Ken Shamrock	1	42
138	Pat Barrett	1	38
139	Sonny King	1	36
140	Bull Buchanan	1	34
140	The Goodfather	1	34
142	Mosh	1	28
142	Thrasher	1	28
144	Grand Master Sexay	1	27
144	Scotty 2 Hotty	1	27
146	The Rock	5	24
147	Goldust	1	22
148	Hollywood Hulk Hogan	1	19
149	Rico	1	16
15	Crash Holly	1	15
151	Test	1	13
152	Diamond Dallas Page	1	12
152	Kanyon	1	12
154	Henry O. Godwinn	2	9
154	Phineas I. Godwinn	2	9
156	Roddy Piper	1	8
157	Marty Jannetty	1	7
157	Chief Morley	1	7
159	Al Snow	1	6
160	Paul London	1	3
160	Brian Kendrick	1	3
162	Mabel	1	2
162	Mo	1	2
164	Bob Backlund	1	1
164	Pedro Morales	1	1
164	Chainsaw Charlie	1	1

== See also ==
- List of former championships in WWE
- Tag team championships in WWE
