= Scott Irwin =

American professional wrestler (1952–1987)

- Irwin, c. 1978

Personal information
- Born: Scott Keegan Irwin; May 14, 1952 Duluth, Minnesota, U.S.
- Died: September 5, 1987 (aged 35)
- Cause of death: Brain tumor
- Family: Bill Irwin (brother)

Professional wrestling career
- Ring name(s): Scott Irwin; The Super Destroyer; Super Destroyer #2; Thor the Viking; Lumberjack Eric
- Billed height: 6 ft 3 in (191 cm)
- Billed weight: 295 lb (134 kg)
- Trained by: Verne Gagne
- Debut: March 13, 1976
- Retired: 1986

Scott Keegan Irwin (May 14, 1952 – September 5, 1987) was an American professional wrestler. He was best known for his tag team with his brother Barney "Bill" Irwin.

== Professional wrestling career ==
=== Early career (1976–1978) ===
After training under Verne Gagne in 1975, Irwin debuted for the AWA on March 13, 1976 in Davenport, Iowa, going to a time limit draw with another rookie, Dick Blood. He mainly wrestled preliminary matches until June 1976 when he left for Georgia Championship Wrestling where he stayed until the spring of 1977. From there he went on to Jim Crockett's Mid Atlantic Championship Wrestling. He wrestled in Mid-Atlantic until early 1978.

=== World Wide Wrestling Federation (1978) ===
Irwin debuted in the World Wide Wrestling Federation on March 14, 1978 as one half of the Yukon Lumberjacks, where he was given the ring name "Lumberjack Eric" and his tag team partner, Zarinoff Lebeouf, was given the ring name "Lumberjack Pierre". Soon after debuting, The Lumberjacks wrestled against Dino Bravo and Dominic DeNucci for the WWF Tag Team Championship on June 2, but the match ended in a double disqualification. The Lumberjacks continued their feud with Bravo and DeNucci, and after several unsuccessful title rematches, the Lumberjacks finally defeated them for the title on June 26. The Lumberjacks continued their success by retaining their title in several matches over the next several months against the likes of Bravo and DeNucci, Gorilla Monsoon and S. D. Jones and Haystacks Calhoun and Tony Garea. On November 21, The Lumberjacks lost their title to Garea and Larry Zbyszko. After the title loss, Pierre retired from wrestling and Eric left the WWWF.

=== Championship Wrestling from Florida (1979–1980) ===
After leaving the WWWF, Irwin debuted in Championship Wrestling from Florida in December 1978 as "Thor the Viking", with Oliver Humperdink as his manager. While in FCW, Irwin found championship success and wrestled his final match as Thor on October 14, 1979, with a victory over Steve Keirn. The following month, Irwin returned to the CWF as the masked "Super Destroyer", and went on to win a tag team match with Stan Lane against Keirn and Mike Graham.

=== Mid-South Wrestling (1980–1982) ===
Irwin continued to use the Super Destroyer character in the CWF throughout the rest of 1979 before debuting in Mid-South Wrestling on November 27, 1980, in a losing effort to Ted DiBiase. Irwin, as the Super Destroyer, returned to Mid-South on April 18, 1981, and won the tag team championship with the Grappler after defeating Dick Murdoch and the Junkyard Dog in the finals of a tournament to claim the vacant title. However, the Destroyer and the Grappler lost the tag team title days later to Murdoch and JYD, on April 27. Soon after the title loss, Destroyer rebounded by winning the Louisiana Heavyweight Championship on May 1. He held the title for over two months before losing it to Bob Roop on July 22. Irwin continued to perform as the Super Destroyer upon joining the Continental Wrestling Association, and soon formed a successful tag team with the Masked Superstar.

=== The Super Destroyers (1982–1984) ===
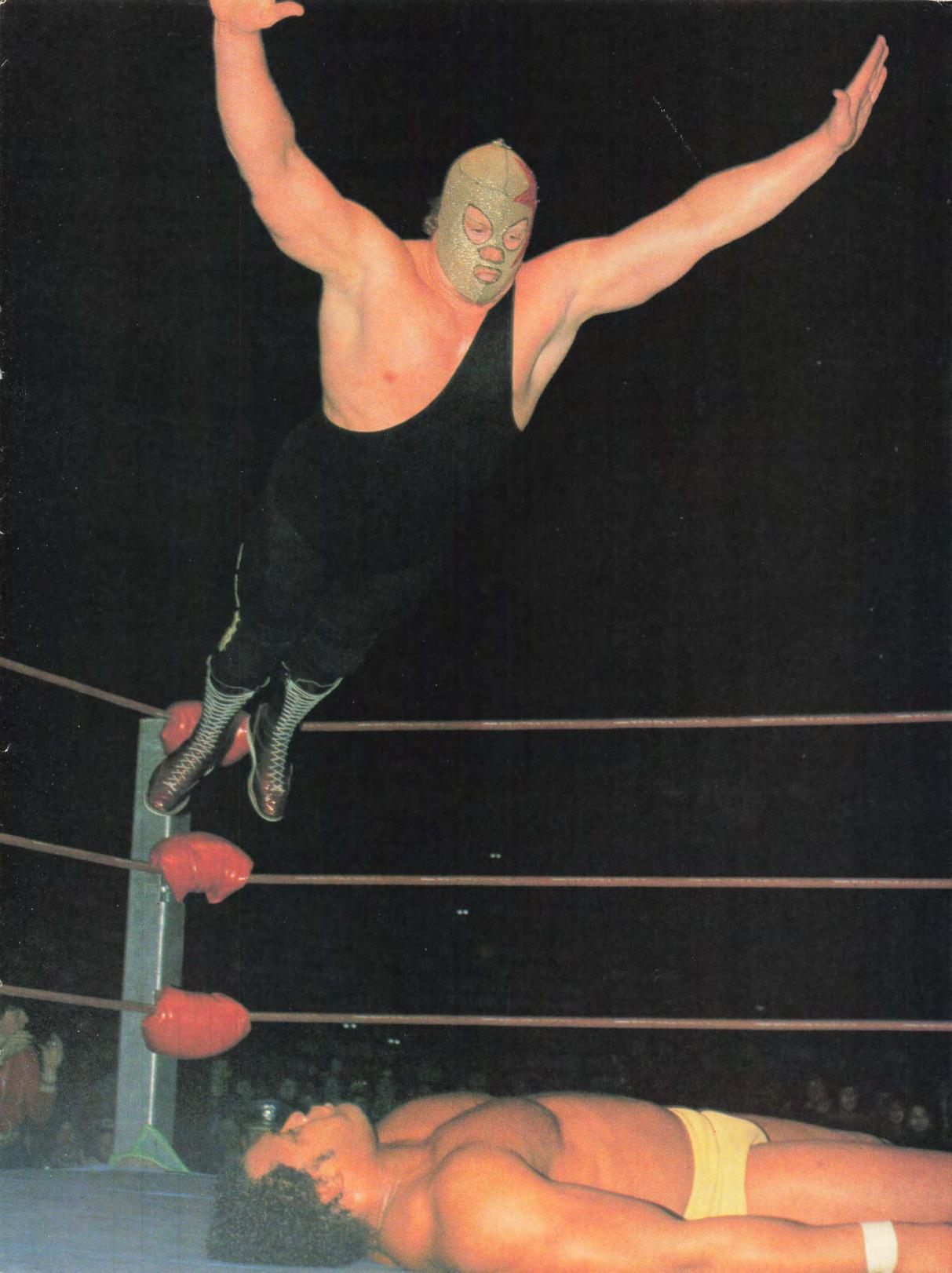
Irwin (top) goes for a splash on to Butch Reed (bottom) in 1983

The team soon jumped ship to Georgia Championship Wrestling, and continued their success by winning the NWA National Tag Team Championship on January 22, 1982 from the Armstrongs (Bob and Brad). Beginning in March, the Superstar gave his half of the title to Big John Studd. On July 2, Super Destroyer and Studd lost the title to The Fabulous Freebirds. After the title loss, Super Destroyer returned to singles competition before he formed The Super Destroyers tag team with his real-life brother Bill Irwin. Bill became Super Destroyer No. 1 while Scott became Super Destroyer No. 2, and the brothers won their first NWA American Tag Team Championship from Bulldog Brower and Roddy Piper in October 1983. Soon after debuting, they acquired Skandor Akbar as a manager. The Destroyers lost the title to Brian Adias and Iceman King Parsons on December 25 before regaining it on January 30, 1984. The Destroyers held the title for four months before losing it to Rock 'n' Soul (Parsons and Buck Zomhofe). The Destroyers quickly rebounded and won the title back thirteen days later, but after the match, Rock 'n' Soul unmasked them.

=== The Long Riders (1984–1986) ===
After being unmasked, the brothers dropped the Destroyers aspect of their team and instead began wrestling under their real names while their tag team was renamed to the "Long Riders". The Riders continued their feud with Rock 'n' Soul and lost the title to them again, on August 4, after Parsons defeated Bill in a singles match. The Riders won the American Tag Team Title for the fourth and final time on September 28 after defeating Rock 'n' Soul. The brothers soon lost the title to the Fantastics (Tommy Rogers and Bobby Fulton) on October 22.

On November 18, Irwin returned to Georgia Championship Wrestling and, with his brother, defeated Brad Armstrong and Jacques Rougeau in the finals of a one-night tournament to win the NWA National Tag Team Championship. The next night, the Long Riders retained their newly won title against Armstrong and Tommy Rich. On January 11, 1985, the Riders lost the title to Ole Anderson and Thunderbolt Patterson. After the Riders lost a rematch for the title the following night, Scott faced Anderson and Patterson in two subsequent rematches with Kareem Muhammad and then Doug Somers as his partners, due to Bill leaving GCW, but was unable to win either rematch. Irwin wrestled a few more matches in GCW before leaving the promotion.

The Long Riders soon sprang up in the American Wrestling Association later in mid-1985, where they lost their debut match to the Road Warriors for the Warriors' AWA World Tag Team Championship on July 14. On September 28, the Riders and Harley Race lost to Genichiro Tenryu, Giant Baba and Jumbo Tsuruta in a six-man tag team match at SuperClash. The Riders continued in the AWA until April 20, 1986, where they lost a tag team title match to Curt Hennig and Scott Hall at WrestleRock. The Long Riders also worked in Montreal for Gino Brito's International Wrestling between treatment for cancer and Scott had lost his hair.

== Death ==
On September 5, 1987, Irwin died from a brain tumor. He was 35 years old.

== Championships and accomplishments ==
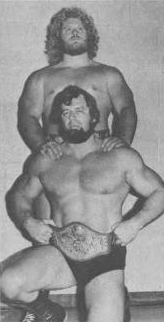
Lumberjack Eric (top) and Lumberjack Pierre (bottom) as WWWF World Tag Team Champions, c. 1978

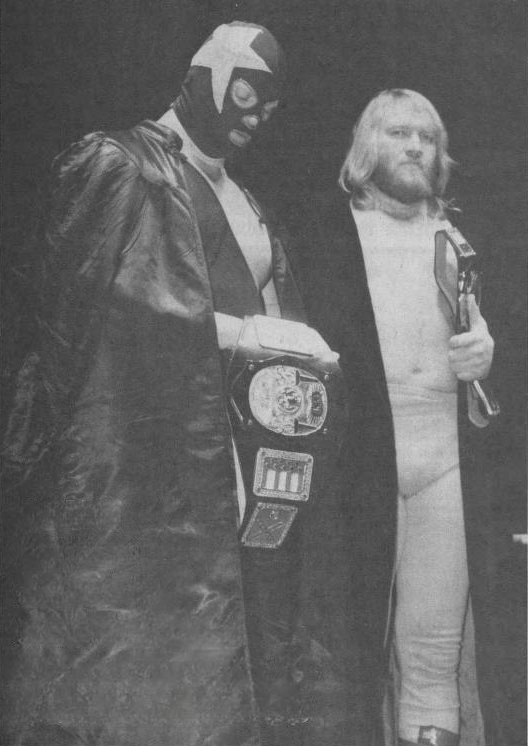
Super Destroyer (left) and Big John Studd (right) as NWA National Tag Team Champions, c. 1982

- Cauliflower Alley Club
  - Posthumous Award (2007) with Betty Joe Hawkins
- Championship Wrestling from Florida
  - NWA Florida Tag Team Championship (1 time) – with Bugsy McGraw
  - NWA Southern Heavyweight Championship (Florida version) (1 time)
  - NWA United States Tag Team Championship (Florida version) (1 time) – with Jos LeDuc
- Georgia Championship Wrestling
  - NWA National Heavyweight Championship (1 time)
  - NWA National Tag Team Championship (3 times) – with Big John Studd (1), Masked Superstar (1), and Bill Irwin (1)
- Lutte Internationale
  - Canadian International Tag Team Championship (1 time) – with Bill Irwin
- Pro Wrestling Illustrated
  - PWI ranked him No. 77 of the 100 best tag teams of the "PWI years", with the Masked Superstar in 2003
- Mid-South Wrestling Association
  - Mid-South Louisiana Heavyweight Championship (1 time)
  - Mid-South Tag Team Championship (1 time) – with The Grappler
- World Class Championship Wrestling
  - NWA American Tag Team Championship (4 times) – with Super Destroyer #1/Bill Irwin
  - WCCW Television Championship (2 times)
- World Wide Wrestling Federation
  - WWWF World Tag Team Championship (1 time) – with Yukon Pierre
- Wrestling Observer Newsletter
  - Best Wrestling Maneuver (1982) Superplex

== See also ==
- List of premature professional wrestling deaths
