= Kal and Lucille Rudman Foundation =

- Founder: Kal Rudman and Lucille Rudman
- Type: Non-operating private foundation (IRS exemption status): 501(c)(3)
- Purpose: Education, Public Safety
- Location: Philadelphia Pennsylvania
- Region served: Local
- Method: Donations and Grants
- Key people: Kal Rudman,
- Revenue: $15,011 (2016)
- Expenses: $420,834 (2016)

The Kal and Lucille Rudman Foundation is a philanthropic organization community and throughout the Philadelphia metropolitan area. The Foundation gives financial support to programs and causes, primarily in the fields of education and public safety. It was founded by Kal Rudman and his wife Lucille Rudman.

== Programs supported ==
The programs supported by The Kal and Lucille Rudman Foundation include:

- The Rudmans currently donate $25,000 each year now for a decade, (for a cumulative contribution of $350,000) through the Kal and Lucille Rudman Foundation to fund college scholarships to graduates of the "Health Tech" career development program that puts Olney High School students "on the payroll" of St.Christopher's Hospital for Children to give them valuable experience and much-needed confidence.
- As part of the City of Philadelphia's Fire Prevention Campaign, the Rudmans funded 50 billboards in prime locations throughout Philadelphia. They have also paid for thousands of home fire alarms given out free to people in need throughout Philadelphia.
- For the eighth year, the Rudmans have provided scholarships for over 300 Philadelphia Police Officers to take courses at Community College of Philadelphia. For the ninth year, they have provided scholarships to all Philadelphia firefighters who apply to Holy Family University to earn a Bachelor of Science degree in Fire Science and Administration. And, the Rudmans now sponsor classes at the Community College of Philadelphia so that people in need can be licensed as Nurses' Aides.
- Scholarships to high school students attending special summer sessions at the University of the Arts. Their participation has allowed many students to get first-hand training in the arts as well as the entertainment industry.
- For the new Audenreid High School, the Rudmans bought a large number of books to fill the empty library. They also purchased gym uniforms for the students.
- The foundation has also sponsored everything from Variety Club parties for autistic children to the city's Nativity scene on the grounds of the Municipal Services Building. And, when the statue of the Baby Jesus was stolen from that scene, Kal Rudman stepped in to pay for around-the-clock police guard to assure continued safety.
- The Rudmans gave more than $2 million to the Temple University to build a digital broadcast center and educational television system for the Temple University School of Communication, Television, and Theater.
- Previously, they provided $1,000,000 to establish the Kal and Lucille Rudman Institute for Entertainment Studies (motion pictures, television and radio networks, digital media, and gaming technology) at the College of Media Arts Design of Drexel University, providing Bachelor's and master's degrees for top executive positions—and, which is now nationally known.

== The Rudman Digital Broadcast Center at Temple University ==
Temple University in Philadelphia has formally announced a $1.2 million donation from the Rudmans for a new state-of-the-art digital media production center and television station - one of the largest gifts given by the Rudmans.

Called TUTV, the new station is housed in Annenberg Hall. It will air student films and news shows, showcase student artwork and musical pieces, and feature recruitment advertising for Temple.

Temple secured a digital license for the station from the city in January and is negotiating with cable companies. The station will give students experience in production and station management, including sales, marketing, promotion, and finance. As part of the Rudman gift, an internship and seminars in broadcasting topics will be offered.

Temple had a station in 1995, but it was discontinued. Drexel and La Salle Universities and Community College of Philadelphia currently have stations.

== The Health Tech Program at St. Christopher's Hospital ==
The Rudmans have been involved in this program for 14 years. The plan was inspired by Louis Lessick, a teacher at Olney High School, who wanted to give students, especially those at-risk, a reason to continue their efforts, a direction, and an exposure to a profession they could pursue through school. The program was not initially funded, and the Rudmans and the Tenet Corporation (which owns St. Christopher's Hospital) provided support.

The program takes deserving students from some of the highest crime neighborhoods in the city and gives them the opportunity to work with health professionals, who double as their mentors. Each school year, 30 students get paid to work 16 hours a week at the hospital. Each summer, the number swells to 50. Graduates of the program have gone on to work in cancer research, as respiratory specialists, nurses, and a handful are preparing for medical school, among many other fields. The graduation rate for the students enrolled in Health Tech is 98 percent. The average rate for public high schools in Philadelphia just slipped to 57 percent.
