= Johnny Valiant =

American professional wrestler and manager (1946–2018)

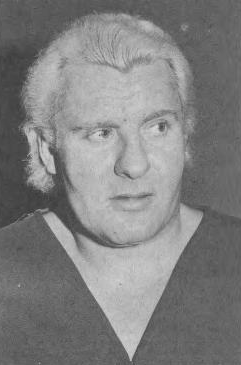
- Sullivan, c. 1981

Personal information
- Born: Thomas Sullivan; November 25, 1946 Pittsburgh, Pennsylvania, U.S.
- Died: April 4, 2018 (aged 71) Ross Township, Pennsylvania, U.S.
- Cause of death: Traffic collision

Professional wrestling career
- Ring name(s): Johnny Valiant; Luscious Johnny V John L. Sullivan
- Billed height: 6 ft 4 in (193 cm)
- Billed weight: 245 lb (111 kg)
- Billed from: New York City, New York
- Trained by: Al Costello
- Debut: 1967
- Retired: 2006

John L. Sullivan (born Thomas Sullivan; November 25, 1946 – April 4, 2018) was an American professional wrestler and manager, better known by his ring name, Johnny Valiant. He competed in the World Wide Wrestling Federation (WWWF), which became the World Wrestling Federation during his time with the promotion. He won the World Tag Team Championship two times. The first run (which lasted over a year) was with his first and most famous storyline brother Jimmy Valiant over Tony Garea and Dean Ho on May 8, 1974; his second title run was with his second storyline brother Jerry Valiant over Tony Garea and Larry Zbyszko on March 6, 1979.

== Professional wrestling career ==
=== Wrestling career (1967-1981) ===
Sullivan grew up in Pittsburgh's North Hills suburb, not far from wrestling champion Bruno Sammartino. After asking for advice on how to become a professional wrestler, Sullivan became close friends with Sammartino and began his career in the Detroit territory wrestling, refereeing and working the ring crew for the wrestling villain and promoter, The Sheik. Kangaroo Al Costello trained Sullivan in the mat wars and soon he began traveling the twenty-five regional territories throughout the U.S., Puerto Rico and Canada. From 1969 through 1973, he enjoyed a protracted stint in the WWWF as "John L. Sullivan," a mid-card babyface, losing to top-tier heels like Killer Kowalski and Toru Tanaka, but repeatedly holding the notorious Baron Mikel Scicluna to a draw, and regularly defeating low-carders like Angelo Savoldi and Johnny Rodz. Autographs of Valiant during the "Sullivan" era are believed to be rare. On one of his visits to Ontario working for Dave McKigney, Sullivan met Jimmy Valiant. Jimmy took a shine to the young, enthusiastic Sullivan and shortly thereafter, brought him to the World Wrestling Association, where Dick the Bruiser teamed up Sullivan (now renamed Johnny Valiant) with Jimmy Valiant as the Valiant Brothers. A victory for the WWA tag team titles over Dick the Bruiser and Bruno Sammartino put the name of the Valiant Brothers on the marquee and the Valiants proceeded to have a five-year run.

=== Managerial career (1981-1989) ===
After he retired from active competition, Valiant went on to a successful career as a manager. He briefly managed Hulk Hogan in the AWA in 1981 until shortly after Hogan's turn to face. Valiant moved back to the WWF and went on to manage Brutus Beefcake beginning in 1984. The pair appeared at the inaugural WrestleMania I event with Beefcake battling David Sammartino (seconded by his father Bruno Sammartino) to a double disqualification after Valiant slammed David on the floor before being attacked by Bruno who threw him into the ring where all four continued the fight. Valiant and Beefcake were also regulars on other WWF television shows including the weekly syndicated WWF Championship Wrestling.

Soon after in May 1985, Valiant and fellow heel manager Jimmy Hart put together The Dream Team with Beefcake teaming with then Intercontinental Champion Greg Valentine. After initially feuding with Tito Santana (who reclaimed the IC title from Valentine in July) and the Junkyard Dog, The Dream Team began to challenge The U.S. Express (Barry Windham and Mike Rotundo) for the WWF World Tag Team championship after Valentine had lost the IC title to Santana in July. On August 24, 1985, at The Spectrum in Philadelphia, Valiant led the Dream Team to the Tag Team championship, when they defeated The U.S. Express after Beefcake rubbed Valiant's lit cigar in Windham's eyes. The Dream Team held on to the title for eight months, facing challenges from teams such as the U.S. Express and The Killer Bees (Jim Brunzell and B. Brian Blair) before losing it to the British Bulldogs (Dynamite Kid and Davey Boy Smith) in the Chicago segment of WrestleMania 2. The Dream Team chased the Bulldogs for the next few months but were unsuccessful in regaining the championship belts.

Valiant added Dino Bravo to his stable in early 1987. At WrestleMania III in front of 93,173 at the Pontiac Silverdome, Valiant, Valentine and Bravo abandoned Beefcake in the ring after the Dream Team had defeated The Rougeau Brothers (Jacques and Raymond) and The New Dream Team of Valentine and Bravo was born. Not as successful as the first incarnation, this Dream Team had a lengthy feud with the scorned Beefcake, now nicknamed "The Barber", who cut Valiant's hair on an episode of Superstars of Wrestling when an overly confident Luscious had given the New Dream Team the night off. The New Dream Team initially feuded with The Islanders (Haku and Tama) as well as continuing the feud with the Rougeaus. The Dream Team also had a couple of unsuccessful Tag Team Championship matches against then-champions The Hart Foundation (Bret Hart and Jim Neidhart). These matches were unusual for the time as both teams were heels with The Hart Foundation managed by Jimmy Hart.

Also in this stint in the WWF, Valiant was known to do commentary on matches from time to time (filling in on Wrestling Challenge for fellow heel manager/commentator Bobby "The Brain" Heenan when he had to leave the broadcast booth to manage one of his wrestlers) and introduced the team of Demolition (Ax and Smash during which time the original Smash (Moondog Rex) was replaced by Barry Darsow due to fans recognizing him as one of The Moondogs). After a few months, Demolition was managed by Mr. Fuji.

One of Valiant's last appearances as a manager in the WWF was at the 1987 Survivor Series. After this show, Valiant was phased out as manager of the New Dream Team and was then relegated to the role of a wrestler once again, as a jobber to the stars. Valiant left the WWF in March 1988, just before WrestleMania IV, and then returned to the AWA as a manager and led the Destruction Crew (Wayne Bloom and Mike Enos) to the AWA World Tag Team Championship in 1989 (defeating Greg Gagne and Paul Diamond in a tournament final).

=== After wrestling (1990-2018) ===
Sullivan went by the moniker of Johnny Valiant as an actor and comedian. He appeared on multiple episodes of The Sopranos and Law & Order. He also had several feature films on his resume. His one-man show "An Evening with Johnny Valiant" garnered critical praise from Time Out New York, The Village Voice and WBAI Pacifica Radio. He was remarried in 2004 and lived in Queens, New York City.

A documentary and sequel featuring Johnny Valiant, Jimmy Valiant, and indy wrestlers Sky Hosoya and Larry Brisco called "The Absolute Truth About Pro Wrestling (Parts 1 and 2)" was released in 2008.

== Death ==
Sullivan was struck and killed by a pickup truck at 5:30 a.m. in Ross Township, a northern suburb of Pittsburgh, on April 4, 2018. Police treated it as an accident. He was taken to Allegheny General Hospital, where he was pronounced dead. Police told local news Sullivan was not in a crosswalk, and the driver of the vehicle remained on the scene.

== Championships and accomplishments ==
- Big Time Wrestling (San Francisco)
  - NWA World Tag Team Championship (San Francisco version) (1 time) - with Jimmy Valiant
- Championship Wrestling from Florida
  - NWA Florida Tag Team Championship (1 time) - with Jimmy Valiant
  - NWA United States Tag Team Championship (Florida version) (1 time) - with Jimmy Valiant
- Georgia Championship Wrestling
  - NWA Georgia Tag Team Championship (1 time) - with Jimmy Valiant
- Pro Wrestling Illustrated
  - PWI Tag Team of the Year award in 1974 - with Jimmy Valiant
- World Wide Wrestling Federation
  - WWF Hall of Fame (Class of 1996) - with Jimmy Valiant
  - WWWF World Tag Team Championship (2 times) - with Jimmy Valiant (1) and Jerry Valiant (1)
- World Wrestling Association
  - WWA World Heavyweight Championship (1 time)

- WWA World Tag Team Championship (4 times) - with Jimmy Valiant
