= Lumberjack Pierre =

Canadian professional wrestler (born 1939)

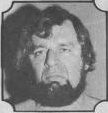

Personal information
- Born: Rejean Gagnon; February 13, 1939 (age 87) Montreal, Quebec, Canada

Professional wrestling career
- Ring name(s): Lumberjack Pierre; The Russian Stomper; Igor Volkoff; Private Zarinoff Lebeouf; Soldier Lebeouf; Yukon Pierre; Ivan Zarnoff; Buffalo Zarnoff
- Billed height: 6 ft 0 in (183 cm)
- Billed weight: 255 lb (116 kg)
- Debut: 1964
- Retired: 1983

Rejean Gagnon (born February 13, 1939) is a French Canadian former professional wrestler who is best known for his appearances with the World Wide Wrestling Federation under the ring name Lumberjack Pierre where he was the half of The Yukon Lumberjacks.

== Professional wrestling career ==
=== Early career (1964–1975) ===
Lafluer joined Dick the Bruiser's WWA in 1964 where he wrestled as a Russian Igor Volkoff. He left the territory in 1969. In 1972 he worked for International Wrestling Enterprise in Japan as Buffalo Zarnoff. Also he worked in Portland, Vancouver, Montreal and Minnesota.

=== Various promotions (1975–1978) ===
He made his debut in 1975 in the San Francisco territory of NWA as Soldier Lebeouf. He was not successful in San Francisco territory, so he left it after a short time. He wrestled with Nick Gulas and Jerry Jarrett in CWA Memphis as The Russian Stomper. He used the same gimmick in Jim Crockett's Mid-Atlantic territory.

He returned to Indianapolis, where the first fame rose when he started the gimmick Private Zarinoff Lebeouf as part of the tag team Legionnaires. He replaced Private Don Fargo and teamed with Sgt. Jacques Goulet. Fargo and Goulet had a fight. Due to this, Fargo left WWA and Zarinoff had to replace him as Goulet's partner.

=== World Wide Wrestling Federation (1978–1979) ===
Zarinoff left for World Wide Wrestling Federation in 1978 as Lumberjack Pierre. He became one half of the tag team Yukon Lumberjacks with Yukon Eric.

==== World Tag Team Championship ====
On June 26, 1978, the Yukon Lumberjacks defeated Dino Bravo and Dominic DeNucci to win the WWF Tag Team Championship which was the only title of Pierre and they held the titles briefly. On November 21, they lost the titles to Tony Garea and Larry Zbyszko. Pierre would fight singles matches as an enhancement talent later on before he left the WWWF in early 1979.

=== Later career (1979–1983) ===
He came back to Québec for Varousac until a real shoot fight with Raymond Rougeau and left the territory for Portland.

He retired from wrestling in 1983.

== Championships and accomplishments ==
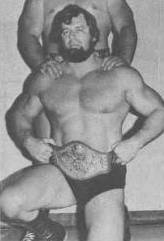
Lumberjack Pierre as WWWF World Tag Team Champion in 1978

- World Wrestling Association
  - WWA World Tag Team Championship (3 times) – with Jacques Goulet (2 times) and Roger Kirby (1 time)
- World Wide Wrestling Federation
  - WWWF World Tag Team Championship (1 time) – with Yukon Eric
