= Kal Rudman =

American disc jockey and philanthropist (1930–2021)

- Born: Solomon Rudman; March 6, 1930; Philadelphia, Pennsylvania, U.S.
- Died: November 30, 2021 (aged 91); Cherry Hill, New Jersey, U.S.
- Education: University of Pennsylvania, 1951
- Occupations: Disk jockey, wrestling announcer, music journalist
- Spouse: Lucille

Solomon "Kal" Rudman (March 6, 1930 – November 30, 2021) was an American disc jockey, long-time publisher of the music industry magazine "Friday Morning Quarterback," professional wrestling television commentator and a philanthropist. He founded the Kal and Lucille Rudman Foundation with his wife.

== Early life and education ==
Born in Philadelphia on March 6, 1930, Rudman attended Ferguson School, then graduated from Central High School with a strong interest in radio. He received a bachelor's degree in education from the University of Pennsylvania in 1951, and worked as a special education teacher.

== Career ==
Rudman later became a Top 40 disc jockey at WCAM in Camden, New Jersey, and later Billboard magazine's first R&B editor.

In 1968, out of his basement, he began publishing Friday Morning Quarterback, a music industry trade magazine. He said in an interview with The Philadelphia Inquirer in 1994 that he was the first to spot Judy Collins' "Send in the Clowns," Hall and Oates' "She's Gone," and Kenny Rogers' "Lucille" as hits.

Rudman appeared on The Merv Griffin Show more than 30 times, was a music-expert regular on the Today Show, and was known as "Killer Kal" for his work as an announcer for the World Wrestling Federation.

He advised Bruce Springsteen on how to make his music more popular with females. "Hungry Heart" on The River album, released in 1980. "Kal explained to me that Top 40 radio is mainly listened to by girls and that my female demographic was low," Springsteen said in an interview at the time.

His flagship trade publication, among six, is Friday Morning Quarterback (FMQB), a music industry trade magazine. Forbes called Rudman one of the major influences in the leisure and entertainment industry in the United States.

Rudman was still active in radio. He was a weekly guest on Bob Pantano's Dance Party on WOGL in Philadelphia.

=== WWF (1977–1989) ===
Rudman mostly called the monthly action for PRISM for the WWF's arena shows that took place at the Philadelphia Spectrum. Rudman was often paired with either Dick Graham or Gorilla Monsoon. Rudman earned the nickname "Killer Kal" while interviewing Hulk Hogan. Sometimes he would also appear for the WWF's monthly Madison Square Garden shows and as a fill-in interviewer on WWF Championship Wrestling. After the WWF stopped airing the shows in the Spectrum on PRISM in 1989, Rudman no longer contributed for the WWF. Rudman helped Vince McMahon gain contacts in the entertainment world during McMahon's national expansion in the Rock 'n' Wrestling era.

== Honors and awards ==
Rudman has been awarded honorary doctorates from Drexel University, the University of the Arts, and Holy Family University. He has been selected to the Philadelphia Broadcast Pioneers Hall of Fame, and has been named that group's "Person of the Year"; “Man of the Year” by the Black Music Association; “Community Philanthropist of the Year” by Community College of Philadelphia; as well as receiving a plaque on the Music Legends Walk of Fame in Philadelphia. He was also an Honorary Philadelphia Fire Commissioner and Honorary Deputy Police Commissioner.

== Personal life ==
Rudman and his wife Lucille were residents of Cherry Hill, New Jersey. He died on November 30, 2021, at the age of 91, and she on December 2.

== Films ==
- Devo (dir. Chris Smith, 2024)
