= Rene Goulet =

Canadian professional wrestler (1932–2019)

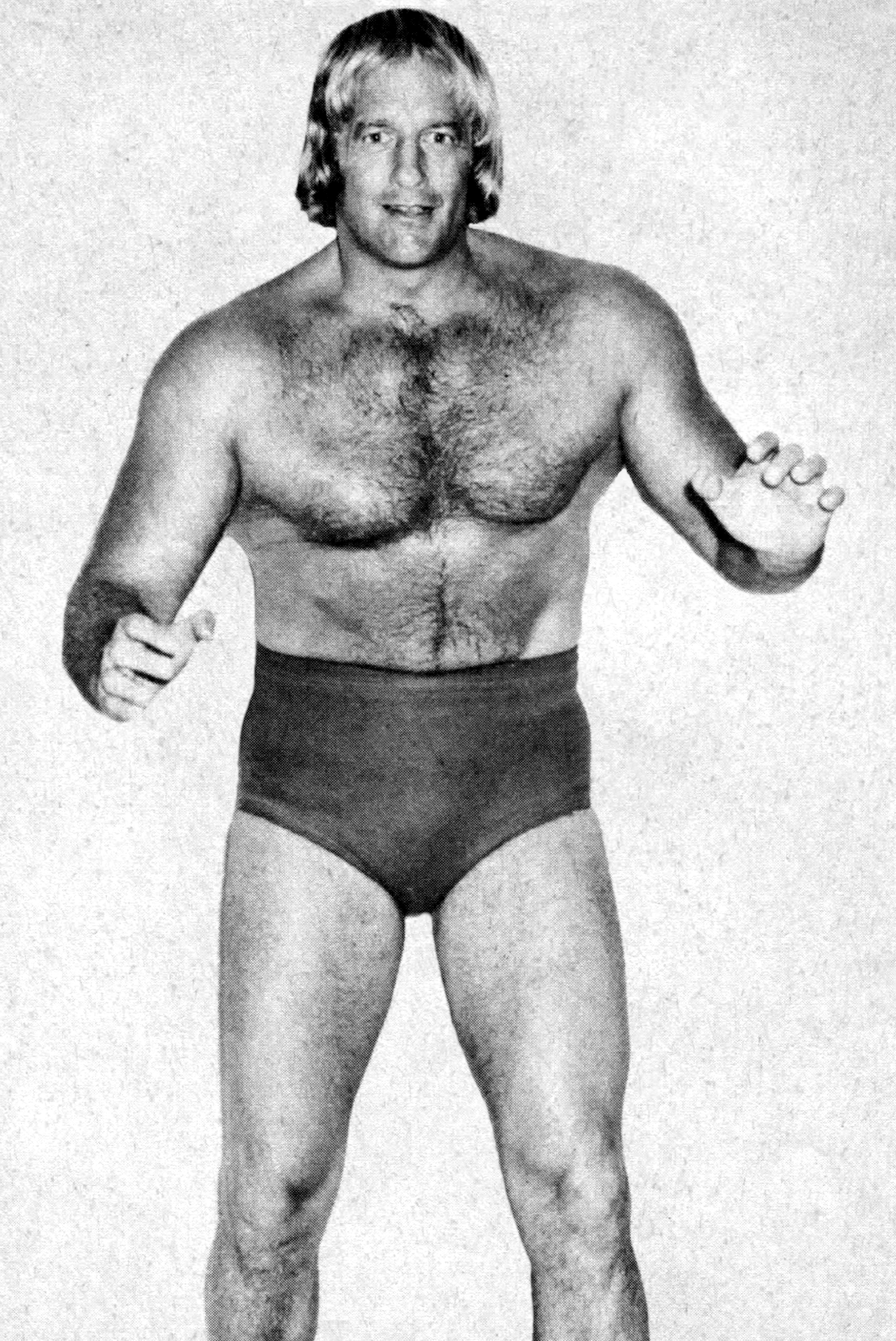
- Goulet, c. 1973

Personal information
- Born: Robert Bédard; July 12, 1932 Quebec City, Quebec, Canada
- Died: May 25, 2019 (aged 86) Matthews, North Carolina, U.S.

Professional wrestling career
- Ring name(s): Buddy Rogers Jr. Rene Goulet; Sgt. Jacques Goulet
- Billed height: 6 ft 0 in (183 cm)
- Billed weight: 236 lb (107 kg)
- Billed from: Nice, France
- Debut: 1957
- Retired: 1987

Robert Bédard (July 12, 1932 – May 25, 2019) was a Canadian professional wrestler better known by his ring name, the "Number One Frenchman" Rene Goulet. He is notable for working in the World Wrestling Federation from 1971 to 1972 and from 1980 to 1997 as a wrestler and road agent.

== Early life ==
Robert Bedard was born on July 12, 1932, in Quebec City and played hockey as a defenseman, on one occasion nearly dying after an opponent's skate cut into his throat. In addition to hockey, Bedard trained as a bodybuilder and a boxer, but decided to try out wrestling after another boxer warned him he would be "punch drunk" by the time he was 25.

== Professional wrestling career ==
Goulet began his career in Quebec City, Quebec, in 1957, with his first match being against Gerard Dugas. Bedard adopted his ring name Rene Goulet when he began working in Verne Gagne and Wally Karbo's Minneapolis territory. Gagne and Karbo changed Bedard's name to capitalize on his good looks (and the popularity of singer Robert Goulet). Despite initially not knowing English, he succeeded, and he and his wife would both work hard to learn the language. He spent the early part of his career traveling the territories, spending a significant amount of time in the American Wrestling Association. He achieved his greatest fame in the 1970s and 1980s with the World Wrestling Federation, winning the WWWF Tag Team Championship with Karl Gotch on December 6, 1971, by defeating "Crazy" Luke Graham and Tarzan Tyler.

Gotch and Goulet dropped the belts to Baron Mikel Scicluna and King Curtis Iaukea at the next television taping on February 1, 1972, staying on a few more months before looking for new opportunities. Discussing the training that helped Goulet gain wrestling skills, he stated "Sometimes, you didn't even know this guy standing in front of you. Some guys you'd go in against were horrible, and it wasn't just a matter of having a good match, it was a matter of protecting yourself. It was all ad-lib...there was no script. In my time, you went in the ring and you worked. You went from move to move, without having any idea what was coming next." Goulet worked briefly in Germany in the early 1970s, with promoters deciding to name him "Buddy Rogers Jr." in reference to Buddy Rogers.

Goulet was in the first WWF match ever televised on the USA Network, with his opponent being Tito Santana. Goulet was known as a very dependable wrestler who could always be trusted to have a good match. As a result, he was often selected to have matches with rookie wrestlers so he could carry the match. The list of wrestlers who had either had their first match or one of their first matches against Goulet includes Ric Flair, Chris Taylor, the Iron Sheik, Jim Brunzell, Greg Gagne and Ken Patera. He was the subject of a full-page photo in the third issue of People Magazine of March 11, 1974. The photo was taken of Bédard in a bear hug from Chris Taylor in Taylor's first professional match. While in the AWA in the early 1980s he was known as "Sgt. Jacques Goulet" and used a claw hold he called "Le Scorpion". He was known for wearing a glove on just one hand, sometimes wearing a fancy glove from the locker room then changing to a workglove at the start of the match. By then he eventually settled to Charlotte, North Carolina.

Goulet found himself brought into a variety of territories in North America as well as promotions from around the world. Goulet worked in Europe, Australia, and Japan, working in singles and tag team competition. In Japan, he teamed with Andre the Giant (one of his long time friends) to win the New Japan Pro-Wrestling World Tag League in 1981. Goulet wrestled regularly until 1986, and he competed in a legends battle royal in the Meadowlands Arena in 1987. He worked as a road agent for the WWF until 1997 and could frequently be seen coming to the ring to maintain control when wrestlers got into fights. He had a recurring role in the classic wrestling show, Tuesday Night Titans, as the host of "Cafe Rene". Goulet was involved in one of wrestling's biggest angles when he, Tony Garea, Blackjack Lanza, and other road agents fought furiously to save The Ultimate Warrior when he was locked in a coffin by The Undertaker.

== Retirement and death ==
Following Goulet's release from the company in 1997, he spent his later life enjoying retirement with his wife. Goulet was an avid golfer and regularly competed in celebrity charity tournaments. He eventually became an American citizen and continued residing in North Carolina. Rene and his wife were together for nearly 70 years, and he worked hard to be home as often as possible and credits his marriage's longevity and happiness to a number of things, quoting "First of all, of course, there has to be love. Then there's respect between each other. It won't work without respect. At our house nobody's the boss. Whatever she says is OK, whatever I say is OK. We always talk with each other before we make a decision. Thank God she was very good with that, because it's hard to last that long in the wrestling business. It's almost a miracle. But you have to work at it."

Goulet died on May 25, 2019, at the age of 86. His death was not announced until December 2019.

== Championships and accomplishments ==
- Championship Wrestling from Florida
  - NWA Southern Heavyweight Championship (Florida version) (3 times)
- George Tragos/Lou Thesz Professional Wrestling Hall of Fame
  - Class of 2010
- Georgia Championship Wrestling
  - NWA Georgia Tag Team Championship (1 time) – with Ole Anderson
- New Japan Pro-Wrestling
  - MSG Tag League (1981) – with André the Giant
- Pacific Northwest Wrestling
  - NWA Pacific Northwest Tag Team Championship (2 times) – with Pepper Martin and Shag Thomas
- World Wrestling Association
  - WWA World Tag Team Championship (2 times) – with Don Fargo and Zarinoff Lebeouf
- World Wide Wrestling Federation
  - WWWF World Tag Team Championship (1 time) – with Karl Gotch
