= John Hill (wrestler) =

Canadian professional wrestler (1941–2010)

Personal information
- Born: John Steele Hill; July 8, 1941 Hamilton, Ontario, Canada
- Died: March 10, 2010 (Aged 68) Indianapolis, Indiana, U.S.

Professional wrestling career
- Ring name(s): Guy Hill; Guy Mitchell; The Stomper; Jerry Valiant; The Masked Strangler; Mr. X (in Vancouver); The Destroyer; The Assassin; Guy Heenan
- Billed height: 6 ft 3 in (191 cm)
- Debut: 1959
- Retired: 1988

John Steele Hill (July 8, 1941 – March 10, 2010) was a Canadian professional wrestler best known under the ring names Guy Mitchell, The Stomper and "Gentleman" Jerry Valiant. During his career, he held the top singles titles in Australia and Vancouver, and competed in the World Wide Wrestling Federation (WWWF) where he won the WWWF World Tag Team Championship.

== Professional wrestling career ==
=== 1960s ===
Hill became a professional wrestler in 1959 after working out for a year at both Al Spittles's and Jack Wentworth's gyms in Canada. He traveled to the United States in 1960 in the hopes of making more money. At the beginning of his career, Hill wrestled under the ring name Guy Hill. While wrestling for Georgia Championship Wrestling in 1961, however, a news reporter accidentally referred to him as Guy Mitchell, and Hill was forced to take on the new name. Under his new identity, Mitchell held the Georgia version of the NWA Southern Heavyweight Championship for one week. Shortly thereafter, he teamed with Bob Rasmussen to win the Georgia version of the NWA Southern Tag Team Championship.

Mitchell later wrestled in Indianapolis, where he formed a tag team in the World Wrestling Association (WWA) with Joe Tomasso known as The Assassins. Together, the team won the WWA World Tag Team Championship three times in 1965 and 1966. The team was managed by a rookie manager named Bobby Heenan. Although The Assassins were a heel (villain) tag team who wore masks, Mitchell also competed as a face (fan favorite) singles wrestler without a mask. Mitchell also wrestled as Guy Heenan in some areas, where he was a storyline sibling of Heenan.

While wrestling in the Australian World Championship Wrestling, he used the ring name The Destroyer and wrestled under a mask. On September 3, 1966, he defeated Bearcat Wright to win the IWA World Heavyweight Championship. The Destroyer's mask was eventually removed, and he announced to the audience that his name was John Hill. After leaving Australia, he began competing in Toronto, Ontario in 1967 as The Assassin.

=== 1970s–1980s ===
After wrestling as a heel for four years in Toronto, The Assassin feuded with The Sheik, losing a death match in July 1971. The Sheik won the match and removed The Assassin's mask, revealing him to be Guy "Stomper" Mitchell. While wrestling as a heel in Toronto, Hill also competed as a babyface in Detroit, Michigan. Because the name Mitchell was already being used by another wrestler, WWA owner Dick the Bruiser gave him the ring name The Stomper. The Stomper teamed with Ben Justice and won the Detroit version of the NWA World Tag Team Championship. The team feuded with The Fabulous Kangaroos (Al Costello and Don Kent), who were managed by George "Crybaby" Cannon. During this feud, The Stomper suffered a kayfabe (storyline) injury when the Kangaroos broke his leg. Because he could not wrestle in Detroit while he was supposedly recovering, Hill wrestled in Japan for several months.

Upon his return to Detroit, The Stomper and Justice continued their feud with the Kangaroos. The teams faced each other in a tournament final for the vacant tag team championship, which the Kangaroos won. The following year, The Stomper and Justice regained the title belts by defeating the Kangaroos. They held the belts for five months, and The Stomper had one last reign as champion when he teamed with Bobo Brazil to win the title for the third time on July 21, 1973. They eventually dropped the belts to Ben Justice and his new partner, Killer Brooks.

Hill went to the Vancouver territory, where he held the Canadian tag team title six times.

In 1979, he was brought into the World Wide Wrestling Federation as Jerry Valiant after Jimmy Valiant contracted hepatitis With Johnny Valiant, he held the WWWF World Tag Team Championship. After Jimmy recovered, the three Valiants worked in six-man tag matches, and sometimes eight-man tag matches with manager Lou Albano. After eight months in the WWF, Hill split from the Valiants and left the area. He returned as a solo prelim wrestler and referee in 1984 when the WWF would use his ring at shows in Indiana, Missouri, Michigan and Kansas.

He retired from wrestling in 1988.

== Personal life ==
Growing up in Ontario, Canada, Hill had six siblings. He played hockey and boxed in his youth. He married Carolyn F. Hill on April 5, 1964, in Indianapolis. They had a son, Jonathan S. Hill. After retiring, Hill owned and operated Hill's Landscaping for 14 years with his son. He enjoyed volunteering as Santa Claus for different organizations in central Indiana Hill died on March 10, 2010, in Indiana from advanced Alzheimer's caused by post-concussion syndrome.

== Championships and accomplishments ==
- Central States Wrestling

- NWA Central States Tag Team Championship (2 times) – with Roger Kirby

- NWA All-Star Wrestling

- NWA Canadian Tag Team Championship (Vancouver version) (6 times) - with Buck Ramstead (1), Gene Kiniski (1), The Brute (1), Ormand Malumba (1), Ricky Hunter (1), and Eric Froelich (1)
- NWA Pacific Coast Heavyweight Championship (Vancouver version) (4 times)

- World Championship Wrestling (Australia)

- IWA World Heavyweight Championship (1 time)

- World Wide Wrestling Federation

- WWWF World Tag Team Championship (1 time) - with Johnny Valiant

- World Wrestling Association

- WWA World Tag Team Championship (5 times) - with Joe Tomasso (3), Roger Kirby (1), and Abdullah The Great (1)
