= WWF Championship Wrestling =

- Created by: Vincent J. McMahon
- Starring: WWF roster
- Country of origin: United States
- Original language: English

Original release
- Network: Syndicated
- Release: February 1971 – August 30, 1986

Related
- WWF Superstars of Wrestling (1986–2001)

WWF Championship Wrestling, or simply Championship Wrestling, was a professional wrestling television program produced by the World Wrestling Federation (WWF, now WWE) that aired from 1971 to August 30, 1986, and was the original television show of the WWF. Originally produced under the World Wide Wrestling Federation (WWWF) banner, Championship Wrestling featured all the stars of the WWF, interviews and championship matches. It was the flagship program of the WWWF/WWF's syndicated programming until it was replaced by Superstars of Wrestling in 1986.

Select episodes were previously available for streaming on the WWE Network.

== History ==
=== Run in syndication ===
This was the first WWF program to be shown on national broadcast television. Vincent J. McMahon built the syndicated network in part by persuading local stations to pay for the rights to air the program. Stations like KPLR-TV in St. Louis and KHJ-TV (now KCAL) in Los Angeles reportedly paid $100,000 to air the show.

In its early years, the show was taped at the Philadelphia Arena and later at the Allentown Agricultural Hall in Allentown, Pennsylvania. Typically, three weeks of television were taped in one night. The final taping in Allentown took place on June 19, 1984, with the episodes airing June 30, July 7, and July 14. The tapings then moved to the Mid-Hudson Civic Center in Poughkeepsie, New York until the final taping took place on August 5, 1986, with the final episode airing on August 30. The final taping featured the coronation of King Harley Race.

The following week, WWF Superstars of Wrestling replaced Championship Wrestling as the WWF's new flagship syndicated program. In contrast to Championship Wrestling, the tapings for Superstars of Wrestling moved around the country and took place at larger arenas.

=== Announcers ===
- Bill Cardille (1971–1972) (1976) (Bill Cardille subbed for Vince McMahon for 3 weeks in the summer of 1976)
- Vincent K. McMahon and Antonino Rocca (1972–1976)
- Vincent K. McMahon and Bruno Sammartino (1976–1980)
- Vince McMahon and Pat Patterson (1980–1983) (Bruno Sammartino occasionally substituted for Patterson)
- Vince McMahon and "Mean" Gene Okerlund (1984)
- Vince McMahon and Tony Garea (1984)
- Vince McMahon and "Living Legend" Bruno Sammartino (1984–1986) (Jesse "The Body" Ventura occasionally substituted for Sammartino)

Ray Stevens (wrestler) and André the Giant both guested as announcers alongside McMahon.

The longtime ring announcer was Joe McHugh, who did the ring announcing and introductions of everyone on staff at the beginning of every broadcast since the 1970s. When the WWF relocated their tapings in 1984, he was replaced by Howard Finkel. Buddy Wagner preceded McHugh in the mid-1970s when the cards were taped at the Philadelphia Arena.

=== Interviewers ===
The interviewer position was filled mostly by McMahon with Pat Patterson also assisting in some cases, until the hire of Gene Okerlund in 1984 which gave him the full-time slot of interviewing wrestlers backstage or at ringside. Jack Reynolds, Freddie Miller, Kal Rudman, and Ken Resnick also did interviews alongside Okerlund until the show's cancellation in 1986.

- Vince McMahon (1972–83)
- Pat Patterson (1980–83)
- Gene Okerlund (1984–86)
- Freddie Miller (1984–85)
- Jack Reynolds (1984–85)
- Kal Rudman (1984–85)
- Ken Resnick (1986)

=== Theme music ===
Probably the most well-remembered theme music of Championship Wrestling is "Scheherazade" by jazz trumpeter Maynard Ferguson. This instrumental piece was used from 1978 and well into 1981. From March 1984 to 1986, an instrumental version of Michael Jackson's "Thriller" was used. This song was accompanied by the image footage of Hulk Hogan winning the WWF title from The Iron Sheik. Other theme music included "Cruise Control" by the Dixie Dregs (October 1981 — March 1984) with footage of Bob Backlund being mobbed and picked up by jubilant fans while holding up the Championship belt. The instrumental "Crater" by Alan Parker was used during the championship reign of Superstar Billy Graham, and accompanied a slow-motion montage in which both he and Bruno Sammartino were featured prominently. "One Fine Morning" by Canadian jazz-rock ensemble Lighthouse was also used (approx. 1974–1975).

Various pop and rock songs were used for commercial bumpers starting in late 1982, including "Start Me Up" by The Rolling Stones, "Dirty Laundry" by Don Henley, "Cars" by Gary Numan, "Private Eyes" and "Out of Touch" by Daryl Hall & John Oates, "The Song Remains the Same" by Led Zeppelin, "Eminence Front" by The Who, "Sleeping Bag" by ZZ Top, "When the World Is Running Down, You Make the Best of What's Still Around", "Every Breath You Take", and "Wrapped Around Your Finger" by The Police, "Too Much Time on My Hands" by Styx, "Pressure" by Billy Joel, "Stand Back" by Stevie Nicks, "Is There Something I Should Know?" by Duran Duran, "Rhythm of the Night" by Debarge, "Let's Dance" by David Bowie, "In the Mood" by Robert Plant, "Jump" by Van Halen, "Dancing in the Dark" by Bruce Springsteen, "Walk of Life" by Dire Straits, "She Bop" and "Money Changes Everything" by Cyndi Lauper, "Conga" by Miami Sound Machine, "Freeway of Love" by Aretha Franklin, "Everybody Wants to Rule the World" by Tears for Fears, "Things Can Only Get Better" by Howard Jones, and "The Power of Love" and "Back in Time" by Huey Lewis and the News.

=== International broadcasts ===
The inaugural WrestleMania was broadcast in Australia in May 1985 on the Ten Network. Ten had a tentative deal in place with the WWF to then show WWF Championship Wrestling on a weekly basis depending on the ratings for WrestleMania. With WrestleMania being a ratings success, Ten brought weekly professional wrestling back to Australian television for the first time since the late 1970s and the show was telecast on Thursday nights, usually in the 10:30 or 11 PM time slot.
