= Haystacks Calhoun =

American professional wrestler (1934–1989)

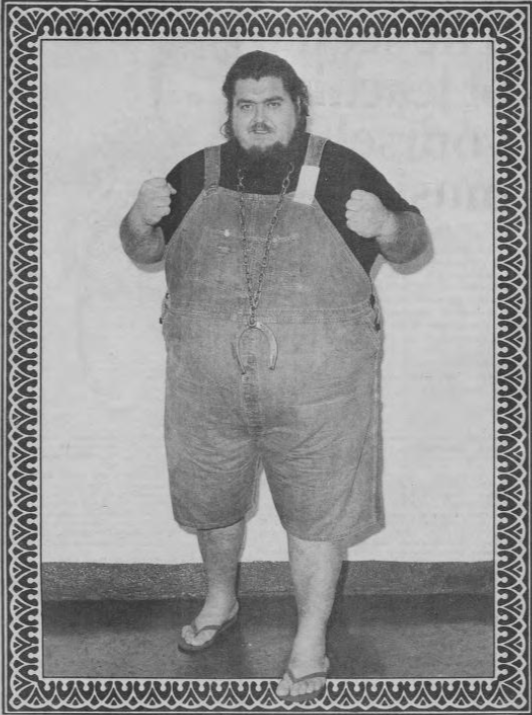
- Calhoun, c. 1974

Personal information
- Born: William Dee Calhoun; August 3, 1934 McKinney, Texas, U.S.
- Died: December 7, 1989 (aged 55) Collin County, Texas, U.S.

Professional wrestling career
- Ring name(s): Country Boy Calhoun; Haystacks; Haystacks Calhoun
- Billed height: 6 ft 4 in (193 cm)
- Billed weight: 601 lb (273 kg)
- Billed from: Morgan's Corner, Arkansas
- Debut: 1956
- Retired: 1980

William Dee Calhoun (August 3, 1934 – December 7, 1989) was an American professional wrestler, who used the professional name "Haystack" or "Haystacks" Calhoun.

== Early life ==
Born on August 3, 1934, William Dee Calhoun grew up on a farm in McKinney, Texas, a rural suburb located in Collin County about 30 miles (48 kilometers) north of Dallas. By age 14, he already weighed 300 pounds (140 kilograms), as he routinely ate a dozen eggs for breakfast. By the time he was in his early 20s, Calhoun weighed over 600 pounds (270 kg). Legend has it that Calhoun was discovered by a traveling wrestling promoter who saw him pick up and move cows across a field. Calhoun first broke into wrestling in 1955 and he began competing for local promoter Orville Brown.

== Professional wrestling career ==
Initially performing under the name "Country Boy Calhoun", he performed in various regional territories, including Houston, Kansas City, and Canada. However, he first appeared nationally on Art Linkletter's House Party, a televised variety show where Calhoun tossed full bales of hay into a high loft. As a result of this feat, he adopted the name "Haystacks Calhoun." Recognizing the show business potential of such a gimmick, Calhoun decided to exaggerate his hillbilly persona by adopting the fictional birthplace of Morgan's Corner, Arkansas, while sporting a bushy beard, white t-shirt, blue overalls, and a genuine horseshoe around his neck on a chain. Moreover, while promoters typically did not book him for championships, he seldom lost a match. He was often booked in handicap matches and battle royals. He was matched up against fellow wrestling giant Happy Humphrey (who was billed as the heaviest wrestler in the world) in a series of highly promoted altercations at Madison Square Garden during the early 1960s. At over 750 lbs (340 kg), Humphrey outweighed Calhoun by over 150 lb (68 kg) and was considerably slower than Calhoun. Calhoun took the majority of the decisions over Humphrey, many by count out as Humphrey often could not get himself back into the ring by the count of 20 when thrown out. Calhoun stated: "He had very poor balance, was easy to get around and easy to handle. I slammed him easier than the average-size fellow. When I learned he was up to 800 pounds I warned him that it wasn't healthy."

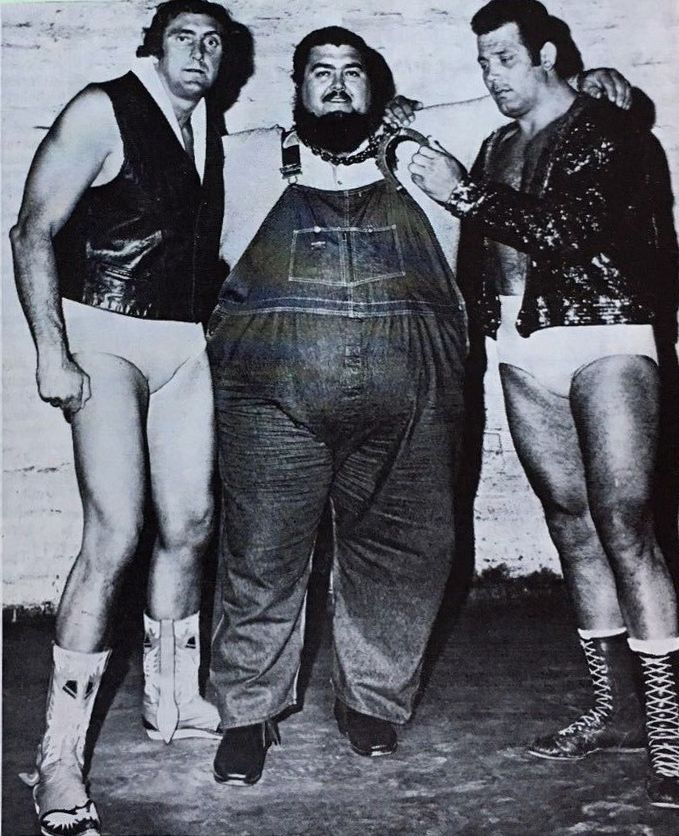
Calhoun (middle), with Tex McKenzie and Mario Milano, c. 1971

On April 14, 1961, in the Chicago International Amphitheatre, he challenged Capitol Wrestling NWA United States heavyweight champion "Nature Boy" Buddy Rogers in a second attempt to take the U.S. title. This bout ended in failure when Rogers dropkicked Calhoun to the ropes and the middle rope broke and Calhoun tumbled to the concrete floor and was counted out. Calhoun had also lost his first championship bout with Rogers in New York's Sunnyside Garden Arena on January 28, 1961. Although mainly active in the eastern half of the United States, he also wrestled in Australia, on tour with other American wrestlers in bouts promoted by United States promoter Sam Menacker. He also wrestled for NWA: All-Star Wrestling in Vancouver, where he twice won the NWA Canadian Tag Team Championship with Don Leo Jonathan. He formed a tag team with the over 600-pound (270 kg) Man Mountain Mike on the West Coast. Their combined weight was over 1,200 pounds (540 kg) in the ring. After engaging in a feud against Dick the Bruiser, Calhoun then generally traveled from territory to territory, never staying in one region for too long.

In 1966 he won both the NWA Tri-State Tag Team Championship and the NWA Canadian Tag Team Championship while teaming with a young Jack Brisco and Don Leo Jonathan, respectively. Moreover, he then helped attract fans to the fledgling Northeast promotion World Wide Wrestling Federation (WWWF). On May 30, 1973, Calhoun paired with Tony Garea to defeat the Japanese duo of Mr. Fuji and Prof. Toru Tanaka for the WWF Tag Team Title; six months later they dropped the titles back to Fuji and Tanaka. He continued working for WWWF until 1979. Calhoun as well continued working in various territories until retiring from wrestling in 1980.

== Death and legacy ==
Calhoun's weight and declining health eventually forced him into retirement, and he was ultimately confined to a double-wide trailer after losing his left leg to diabetes in 1986. He died at age 55 on December 7, 1989. His daughter donated mementos of his wrestling career to the Collin County museum.

Calhoun was more directly an influence on British super heavyweight wrestler Martin Ruane, best known in America for his stint as Loch Ness in World Championship Wrestling. Ruane achieved fame in his home country as "Giant Haystacks", a modified version of Calhoun's gimmick. Ruane first wrestled as "Haystacks Calhoun", a direct copy of the American original, while working for Wrestling Enterprises (of Birkenhead) in the early 1970s, before modifying his name and character. Thus adapted, Ruane later moved to Joint Promotions where he achieved television exposure and national fame as the tag team partner, and later arch enemy, of Big Daddy.

Calhoun often appeared at Capital Arena in Washington, D.C., scuffling on televised bouts. A. J. Weberman was head of Haystacks Calhoun fan club.

He and colleague Andre the Giant were known for a story Andre told about their visit to a diner:

There was a place next to the arena which was one of those all-you-can-eat-for-two-dollars joints... When Haystacks and I walked in you could see the waitress almost faint. About 30 seconds later the manager comes out, takes a peek at us, and shakes his head and goes back to the kitchen... Haystacks and I decided to tie on a real big feed that night and the waitresses were hysterical. They told us the manager was tearing his hair out and practically in tears. But we felt badly, since we must've eaten about $25 worth of food for $4. So after it was over we told him we'd pay the regular price instead of the all-you-can-eat price. He thanked us for that and told us two more like us could put him out of business.

In 2003, WWE listed him as one of the 50 greatest WWE superstars of all time. On March 31, 2017, Calhoun was posthumously inducted into the WWE Hall of Fame as a part of the Legacy Wing.

== Other media ==
Calhoun appears briefly at the end of the 1962 theatrical motion picture version of Rod Serling's teleplay Requiem For A Heavyweight. The protagonist, played by Anthony Quinn, is a punch-drunk prize fighter slipping into oblivion but his manager, played by Jackie Gleason, finds a way to squeeze a few more bucks from his career by lining him up for a "professional wrestling" match. The opponent's name is stated on a poster for the event, and announced as Quinn's character approaches the ring, but only the upper fourth of the wrestler's torso is seen, from the rear, on screen. He scratches his head in response to the behavior of this unknown newcomer. The film's credits make no reference, however, to Calhoun's participation. He was known for his frequent appearances on television including Groucho Marx' show You Bet Your Life and talk shows hosted by Jack Paar and Merv Griffin. Calhoun showed off his strength when he appeared on Art Linkletter's program House Party, where he tossed bales of hay with ease.

On April 26, 2022, Haystacks Calhoun was depicted on NBC's Young Rock in season 2 episode 7, "An Understanding." Calhoun was portrayed by Steve Moulton in this episode which told the story of how Dwayne Johnson's parents met and fell in love.

== Championships and accomplishments ==
- Big Time Wrestling
  - BTW World Tag Team Championship (1 time) – with Sweet Daddy Siki
- Championship Wrestling From Florida
  - NWA Florida Tag Team Championship (1 time) – with Kevin Sullivan
- Mid Atlantic Championship Wrestling
  - NWA Southern Tag Team Championship (1 time) – with Amazing Zuma
- NWA All-Star Wrestling
  - NWA Canadian Tag Team Championship (Vancouver version) (2 times) – with Don Leo Jonathan
- NWA Tri-State
  - NWA United States Tag Team Championship (Tri-State version) (1 time) – with Jack Brisco
- World Wide Wrestling Federation / WWE
  - WWWF World Tag Team Championship (1 time) – with Tony Garea
  - WWE Hall of Fame (Class of 2017)
- Worldwide Wrestling Associates
  - WWA International Television Tag Team Championship (1 time) – with Abe Jacobs
