= List of former Pacific Northwest Wrestling personnel =

This is a list of notable professional wrestlers and personalities that performed in the different incarnations of the Pacific Northwest Wrestling promotion from:

- 1925–1992 (as Don Owen Sports)
- 1992–1997 (as Championship Wrestling USA)

They are listed in alphabetical order of their ring name.

== Wrestlers ==
=== A ===
- Brian Adams Demolition Crush^{†}
- Chris Adams^{†}
- Adrian Adonis (Keith Franke)^{†}
- André the Giant^{†}
- Cuban Assassin

=== B ===
- Art Barr (aka Beetlejuice)^{†}
- Jesse Barr
- Sandy Barr^{†}
- C. W. Bergstrom
- Brady Boone (Dean Peters)^{†}
- Tony Borne (Tony Osborne)^{†}
- Matt Borne (Matt Osborne)^{†}
- Johnathan Boyd (Barry Boyle)^{†}
- Bruiser Brody (Frank Goodish)^{†}
- Killer Brooks (Tim Brooks)^{†}

=== C ===
- Haystacks Calhoun (William Calhoun)^{†}

=== D ===
- Colonel DeBeers / Mega Maharishi (Edward Wiskowski)^{†}
- The Destroyer (Dick Beyer)^{†}
- Steve Doll^{†}
- The Dynamite Kid (Thomas Billington)^{†}

=== E ===
- Paul Ellering
- Eric Embry
- The Equalizer (Bill Dannenhauser)

=== F ===
- Ric Flair (Richard Fliehr)
- Mr. Fuji (Harry Fujiwara)^{†}
- Ron Fuller

=== G ===
- Superstar Billy Graham (Eldridge Wayne Coleman)^{†}
- The Grappler (Len Denton)
- Chavo Guerrero (Salvádor Guerrero Llanes)^{†}
- Gory Guerrero (Salvádor Guerrero Quésada)^{†}
- Mando Guerrero

=== H ===
- Billy Jack Haynes (William Haynes, Jr.)
- Curt Hennig^{†}
- Larry Hennig^{†}
- Dizzy Hogan (Edward Leslie)
- Johnathan Holliday

=== J ===
- Don Leo Jonathan (Don Heaton)^{†}
- Rocky Johnson (Wayde Bowles)^{†}

=== K ===
- Gene Kiniski^{†}
- Nick Kiniski

=== M ===
- Taylor Made (Terri Poch)
- Al Madril
- Magnum T. A. (Terry Allen)
- Rick Martel (Richard Vigneault)
- Mil Máscaras
- Moondog Mayne^{†}
- Bugsy McGraw (Michael Davis)
- Velvet McIntyre
- Butch Miller (Robert Miller)†
- "Mean" Mike Miller
- Gorilla Monsoon (Robert James "Gino" Marella)^{†}
- Pedro Morales^{†}

=== N ===
- Kendo Nagasaki^{†}
- Nord The Barbarian (John Nord)
- Scott Norton

=== O ===
- Rip Oliver†

=== P ===
- Iceman Parsons (King Parsons)
- Pat Patterson^{†}
- Roddy Piper (Roderick Toombs)^{†}
- Tom Prichard

=== R ===
- Harley Race^{†}
- Bull Ramos^{†}
- Steve Regal
- Rip Rogers (Mark Sciarra)
- Tommy Rogers (Thomas Couch)^{†}
- Buddy Rose (Paul Perschmann)^{†}
- Dane Rush
- Irish Paddy Ryan (Earl Patrick Freeman)^{†}

=== S ===
- Coco Samoa^{†}
- Dutch Savage (Frank Stewart)^{†}
- Joe Savoldi
- Bart Sawyer (Steven Stewart)^{†}
- Brett Sawyer (Brett Woyan)^{†}
- Buzz Sawyer (Bruce Woyan)^{†}
- David Schultz
- Scotty The Body [Raven](Scott Levy)
- Steve Simpson (Steve Cohen)
- Tiger Jeet Singh (Jagjit Singh)
- Sgt. Slaughter (Robert Remus)
- Jimmy Snuka (James Reiher)^{†}
- Doug Somers^{†}
- Stan Stasiak (George Stipich)^{†}
- Jules Strongbow (Frank Hill)

=== T ===
- Chris Taylor^{†}
- Shag Thomas^{†}

=== V ===
- Greg Valentine (John Wisniski, Jr.)
- Jesse Ventura (James Janos)

=== W ===
- Luke Williams (Brian Wickens)
- Bearcat Wright (Edward Wright)^{†}

=== Y ===
- Jay Youngblood (Steven Romero)^{†}

=== Z ===
- Tom Zenk^{†}
- Buck Zumhofe (Herman Zumhofe)

== Tag teams ==
- Jesse & Art Barr
- Bruise Brothers
- Buzz & Brett Sawyer
- Larry & Curt Hennig
- Latin Connection (Ricky Santana & Al Madril)
- Juice Patrol (Beatlejuice & Big Juice)
- Kiwi Sheepherders
- Matt Borne & Steve Regal
- The Clan (wrestling stable led by Rip Oliver)
- Southern Rockers (Steve Doll & Scott Peterson & Rex King)
- S&S Express (Steve Simpson & Joe Savoldi)
- U.S. Male (Ricky Santana & Curtis Thompson)
