= Rocky Iaukea =

American professional wrestler

Personal information
- Born: Hawaii, United States

Professional wrestling career
- Ring name(s): Abudadein; Mad Dog of Baghdad; Prince Iaukea; Rocky Iaukea; Cheetah Kid (II)
- Billed weight: 248 lb (112 kg)
- Debut: 1981
- Retired: 1996

Rocky Iaukea is a retired American professional wrestler, known by his ringname Prince Iaukea, who competed in the Pacific Northwest and Southeastern United States with the National Wrestling Alliance during the 1980s, and in Japan during the early 1990s. From 1983 to 1990, he wrestled as Abudadein in Pacific Northwest Wrestling winning the NWA Pacific Northwest Television Championship twice and the NWA Pacific Northwest Tag Team Championship three times with Mike Miller and The Grappler. A second-generation wrestler, he is the son of Curtis Iaukea and a cousin of Maunakea Mossman.

== Career ==
The son of King Curtis Iaukea, a popular wrestler in the United States and Japan during the 1960s and 1970s, Rocky Iaukea followed in his father's footsteps and became a wrestler himself. Making his debut in 1981, Iaukea spent much of his early career in New Japan Pro-Wrestling before coming back to the United States to wrestle for the National Wrestling Alliance in the mid-1980s. On February 14, 1986, he unsuccessfully challenged Kendall Windham for the NWA Florida Heavyweight Championship at the Battle of the Belts II supercard held at the Eddie Graham Sports Arena in Orlando, Florida.

Shortly afterwards, Iaukea began wrestling for Pacific Northwest Wrestling under the name Abudadein. His in-ring persona was that of an Arab American "heel". Teaming with Mike Miller, they defeated Brady Boone and Coco Samoa for the NWA Pacific Northwest Tag Team Championship in Madras, Oregon on June 25, then lost them to Boone and Ricky Santana in Portland four months later. He and Miller regained the titles in Longview, Washington the following month before finally losing them to Ricky Santana and Coco Samoa in Portland on January 7, 1987.

At the end of the year, Iaukea won the NWA Pacific Northwest Television Championship from Art Barr in Portland on December 26, 1987. His time as champion was brief, however, as the title was vacated on January 30, 1988, following a controversial match against Coco Samoa. He briefly won back the title from Top Gun on January 14, 1989, but dropped it to Carl Styles a little over two weeks later.

Iaukea spent his last year in PNW feuding against Pacific Northwest Tag Team Champions The Southern Rockers (Scott Peterson and Steve Doll) with allies Matt Borne and The Grappler. He managed to win the tag team titles once more when he and The Grappler beat The Southern Rockers for the belts in Portland on October 29, 1988. After spending almost three months as champions, he and The Grappler lost the titles back to The Southern Rockers on January 7, 1989. That same year, he appeared for the Bruiser Brody Memorial Show where he and The V lost a tag team match to Shinichi Nakano and Akira Taue at Tokyo's Budokan Hall on August 29, 1988.

In early 1991, Iaukea joined the "Thunder Down Under" tour in New Zealand with several World Wrestling Federation wrestlers including Jim Powers, The Genius, Don Muraco, Angel of Death, Koko B. Ware, The Brooklyn Brawler, The Nasty Boys (Brian Knobs and Jerry Sags) and The Bushwhackers (Butch and Luke). Wrestling under the name Mad Dog of Baghdad, he lost to Siva Afi in Hamilton on March 31. He also accompanied Terry Gordy, "Dr. Death" Steve Williams, Dan Kroffat, Doug Furnas, Joe Malenko, and Dean Malenko in a tour of Japan with All Japan Pro Wrestling that same year. Iaukea eventually returned to Japan full-time where he wrestled for AJPW and WAR up until his retirement in 1996. He later started a charter boat service and he is the owner and captain of a catamaran boat which tours the beaches of Waikiki. In 2006, he was interviewed by Ken Hirayama and discussed his career and retirement. He also expressed his support for Pro Wrestling Noah.

== Championships and accomplishments ==
- Pacific Northwest Wrestling
  - NWA Pacific Northwest Television Championship (2 times)
  - NWA Pacific Northwest Tag Team Championship (3 times) with Mike Miller and The Grappler
- Ring Around The Northwest Newsletter
  - Tag Team of the Year (1986) with Karl Steiner and Abudda Dein
- World Wrestling Council
  - WWC Puerto Rico Heavyweight Championship (1 time)
  - WWC World Tag Team Championship (2 times) with Rip Rogers
