= Well Dunn =

Professional wrestling tag team

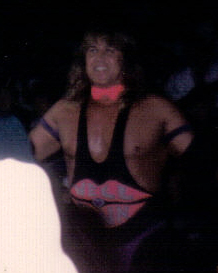
- Steve Doll in 1994, as Steven Dunn

Tag team
- Members: Timothy Well/Rex King (1989–1998); Steven Dunn/Steve Doll (1987–1998); Scott Peterson (1987–1989)
- Name(s): Well Dunn; Southern Rockers; Simply Devine
- Billed heights: Smith: 5 ft 11 in (1.80 m); Doll: 5 ft 10 in (1.78 m)
- Combined billed weight: 470 lbs.
- Debut: 1987
- Disbanded: 1998
- Years active: 1987–1998

Well Dunn, also known as the Southern Rockers, was a professional wrestling tag team who competed in several promotions in the United States. The team was composed of Rex King and Steve Doll, and the team name "Well Dunn" was a play on the term "well done". Accordingly, King wrestled as "Timothy Well" and Doll as "Steven Dunn". King and Doll held championships in Pacific Northwest Wrestling (PNW), the United States Wrestling Association (USWA), the World Wrestling Council (WWC), and Music City Wrestling (MCW).

They are best known, however, for competing in the World Wrestling Federation from 1993 to 1995. In the WWF, Well Dunn faced the promotion's top tag teams and were contenders for the WWF Tag Team Championship. They had a feud with The Bushwhackers that lasted for most of Well Dunn's tenure with the company. The team disbanded in 1996, but reunited briefly in 1998. During this reunion, Doll attacked King and the team separated permanently. Doll died from complications related to a blood clot in 2009, and King died in 2017 from kidney failure.

== History ==
=== Early years (1987–1992) ===
Prior to teaming with Rex King, Steve Doll competed in Pacific Northwest Wrestling with partner Scott Peterson as the Southern Rockers. The team was fashioned after The Rock 'n' Roll Express, and Doll and Peterson held the NWA Pacific Northwest Tag Team Championship together seven times. In August 1989, Peterson left the territory and King began teaming with Doll. They won the tag team title by defeating Scotty the Body and The Grappler on August 26. After an inconclusive rematch on September 9, the title was vacated and another rematch was ordered; the Southern Rockers regained the belts one week later. They held the title until PNW ordered it vacated again on November 4 after a match against Brian Adams and Jeff Warner; once again, Doll and King won a rematch the following week to regain the championship. They dropped the title to Adams and The Grappler on December 14, but regained the belts by winning a rematch on January 27, 1990.

In February 1990, the Southern Rockers vacated the championship and left PNW. They began competing for the United States Wrestling Association, where they quickly won the USWA World Tag Team Championship. Three days after winning the title belts, King and Doll dropped them to Robert Fuller and Brian Lee. They regained them six days later, however. On April 28, they lost the title to The Uptown Posse, but were able to regain it less than a month later. On June 2, King competed in a handicap match, in which he faced The Dirty White Boys (Tony Anthony and Tom Burton). Unable to defeat both men, he lost the match and the championship.

Doll returned to PNW, where he held the tag team title another seven times with various partners. King remained in Tennessee, winning the USWA World Tag Team Championship with Joey Maggs. He later moved to Puerto Rico, where he wrestled for the World Wrestling Council. With Ricky Santana as his new partner, he held the WWC World Tag Team Championship twice. The team separated in May 1992 when Santana did not appear for a match to determine the winners of the vacant tag team title.

Scott Peterson died in a motorcycle accident on July 25, 1994, at 31 years old.

=== Reunion (1992) ===
In June 1992, Doll and King reunited to win the WWC World Tag Team Championship from Doug Masters and Ron Starr. On August 1, the title was vacated due to a controversial finish in a match against a tag team known as Solid Gold. King replaced Doll with Ray González to win the vacant title. The team got back together again in the USWA, where they defeated The Moondogs to win the tag team belts for a fourth time together.

Due to an interpromotional agreement between the USWA and the World Wrestling Federation, Doll and King wrestled at several events alongside WWF wrestlers. While in Tennessee, the team showed a "blatant disregard for the rules" and were involved in a storyline in which they were suspended indefinitely from the USWA as a result.

=== World Wrestling Federation (1993–1995) ===
==== 1993 ====
The team signed with the WWF and took on the new name Well Dunn, with Doll competing as Steven Dunn and King wrestling under the name Timothy Well. They wore bow ties in addition to wrestling singlets with thongs over top. This led wrestling author RD Reynolds to state that the team was "proof positive that bow ties and thongs do not match". On June 15, 1993, they wrestled in their first official WWF match and defeated the team of Tito Santana and Virgil. It was in the WWF that Well Dunn "first experienced widespread fame". In the WWF, they continued to wrestle as heels (rule breakers) and were described as "among the sneakiest and most cunning" teams in the promotion. The team made its WWF television debut on the July 8, 1993, episode of WWF Superstars in a loss to The Smoking Gunns. They teamed with Blake Beverly in a loss to Tatanka and The Steiner Brothers on July 16. They continued to face the WWF's top face (fan favorite) tag teams, including The Smoking Gunns and Men on a Mission.

In August, manager Harvey Wippleman began appearing with the team. On the October 10 episode of All-American Wrestling, they defeated Smoky Mountain Wrestling Tag Team Champions The Rock 'n' Roll Express by countout, but did not win the championship. On October 8, 1993, Well Dunn wrestled their first match against The Bushwhackers, who became the team's longtime rivals in a series of comedy matches. During a match against Men on a Mission, Timothy Well sustained an injury. This forced the team out of action in the WWF for several months, although they did return to competing in Tennessee.

==== 1994–1995 ====
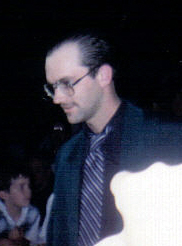
Manager Harvey Wippleman in 1994

In February 1994, through Jim Cornette, Well Dunn was sent to Smoky Mountain Wrestling. While there, they feuded with The Thrillseekers (Chris Jericho and Lance Storm), which culminated in a series of penalty box matches.

Upon their return to the WWF, Well Dunn had a short series of matches against WWF Tag Team Champions The Headshrinkers, including a match televised on WWF Wrestling Challenge. Well Dunn became involved in a storyline in which Adam Bomb, who was also managed by Wippleman, turned on the manager and began wrestling as a face. On the August 13 episode of WWF Superstars, Well wrestled a singles match against Bomb; Dunn interfered, and Bomb attacked Well Dunn and Wippleman after the match. This led to a blow off match one week later, in which Bomb teamed with The Smoking Gunns to defeat Kwang (another of Wippleman's wrestlers) and Well Dunn. On August 17, the team also served as lumberjacks in a lumberjack match between Bret and Owen Hart.

Well Dunn continued to face the top teams in the WWF, including The Smoking Gunns, The Headshrinkers, and the newly formed team of Sparky Plugg and the 1-2-3 Kid. When The Smoking Gunns were unable to compete due to the birth of Billy Gunn's son, Well Dunn competed against The Heavenly Bodies instead; these matches were unusual, as they pitted heel tag teams against each other. As in 1993, Well Dunn lost more matches than they won in each series, but they had occasional victories against established tag teams and were often booked to defeat jobber tag teams.

On September 29, Well Dunn began another series of matches against The Bushwhackers. The feud lasted the remainder of the year, although Barry Horowitz substituted for Steven Dunn in several matches when Dunn was unable to appear. The Bushwhackers were victorious in the majority of matches, but Well Dunn won occasional matches. One of these matches was featured on the Coliseum Video release Wham Bam Bodyslam, and another two were televised on Monday Night Raw. During one of the Monday Night Raw matches, The Bushwhackers were accompanied by ring announcer Howard Finkel, who had a long-standing rivalry with Wippleman. Finkel and Wippleman had an argument during the match that led to a tuxedo match, in which Finkel was declared the winner after stripping Wippleman to his underwear.

Leading up to the 1995 Royal Rumble pay-per-view, Well Dunn was entered in a tournament for the vacant WWF Tag Team Championship. They were scheduled to face The Smoking Gunns, but Bob Holly (formerly Sparky Plugg) and the 1-2-3 Kid took the Gunns' place; Holly and the 1-2-3 Kid won the match and went on to win the tournament. Eliminated from the tournament, Well and Dunn competed individually in the Royal Rumble match, a battle royal. Well was eliminated by Davey Boy Smith, and Dunn was eliminated by Aldo Montoya. After The Smoking Gunns regained the championship, Well Dunn challenged for the belts in a series of matches, but was unable to win the title.

Well Dunn was featured in the Dirtiest Dozen subset of the Action Packed line of WWF trading cards in 1995. The team continued to face the WWF's top tag teams, including The Bushwhackers and The Blu Brothers, but were unable to win any of these matches. The team's final WWF match came in a loss to The Allied Powers, after which Well Dunn disappeared from the WWF.

=== Split (1996–1998) ===
After a brief tour in All Japan Pro Wrestling in January 1996, King returned to the World Wrestling Council, and Doll went to World Championship Wrestling, before going back to the United States Wrestling Association. In 1997, King returned to the USWA and teaming with Paul Diamond, feuding with Doll and Flash Flanagan. A year later, the team reunited in the Nashville, Tennessee-based Music City Wrestling, where they won the MCW North American Tag Team Championship on May 30, 1998. The reunion was short-lived, as Doll and Reno Riggins attacked King after the match. Riggins took King's place as co-holder of the title with Doll.

== Deaths ==
On March 23, 2009, Steve Doll died when a blood clot from his lungs entered his heart. On January 9, 2017, Rex King died from kidney failure.

== Championships and accomplishments ==
Doll and Peterson

- Pacific Northwest Wrestling
  - NWA Pacific Northwest Tag Team Championship (7 times)

Doll and King

- Music City Wrestling
  - MCW North American Tag Team Championship (1 time)
- Pacific Northwest Wrestling
  - NWA Pacific Northwest Tag Team Championship (4 times)
- United States Wrestling Association
  - USWA World Tag Team Championship (4 times)
- World Wrestling Council
  - WWC World Tag Team Championship (1 time)
