= Larry Oliver =

Larry Oliver or Olivier may also refer to:

- Laurence Olivier (1907–1989), English theatre and film actor, director
- Rip Oliver (1952–2020), born Larry Oliver, American professional wrestler
