= Rex King =

Rex King may refer to:

- Rex King (wrestler) (1961–2017), pseudonym of American professional wrestler Timothy A. Smith
- Rex King, a minor character from American adventure comic strip The Phantom
