= Iaukea =

Iaukea or Iʻaukea may refer to:

- Curtis P. Iaukea (1855–1940), Hawaiian diplomat, colonel and court official during the Kingdom of Hawaii
- King Curtis Iaukea (1937–2010), professional wrestler, great-grandson of Colonel Iaukea
- Rocky Iaukea, professional wrestler, son of King Curtis Iaukea
- Prince Iaukea, stage name of Michael Laauli Hayner, unrelated to above
