= NWA Pacific Northwest Television Championship =

Professional wrestling championship

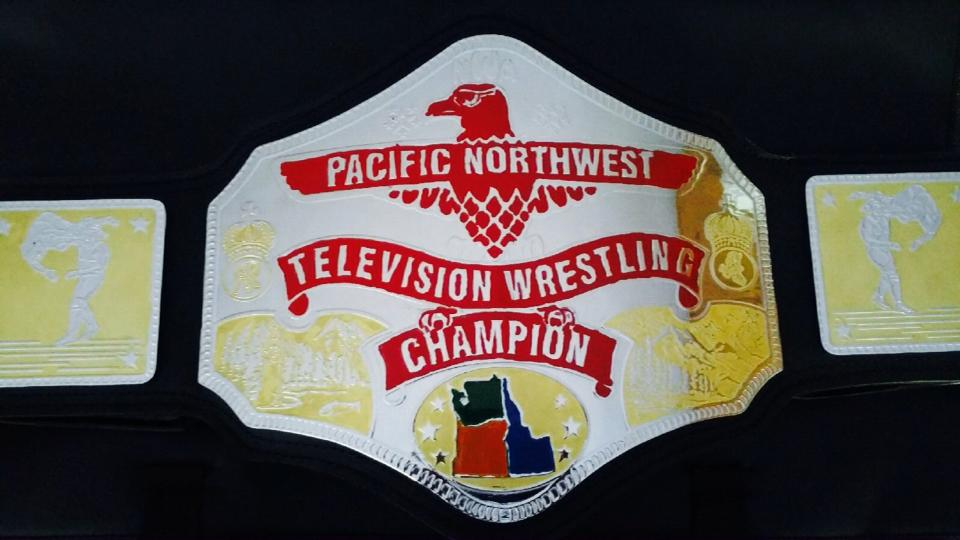
- The current NWA Pacific Northwest Television championship belt, reintroduced in NWA Blue Collar Wrestling in January 10th 2015.

Details
- Promotion: Pacific Northwest Wrestling (1987-1990); NWA Blue Collar Wrestling (2015-2017)
- Date established: November 21, 1987
- Current champion(s): Inactive
- Date won: October 1, 2017
Statistics
- First champion(s): Art Barr
- Most reigns: Al Madril (3 reigns)
- Shortest reign: Abbuda Dein (0 days)

The NWA Pacific Northwest Television Championship was a professional wrestling championship sanctioned by the National Wrestling Alliance and defended in its member promotion Pacific Northwest Wrestling. It served as PNW's second-tier title, lasting from 1987 through 1990. As of March 2015, the championship was reactivated when Blue Collar Wrestling became the NWA's new Portland affiliate.

== Title history ==
Key
No.	Overall reign number
Reign	Reign number for the specific champion
Days	Number of days held
<1	Reign lasted less than a day
+	Current reign is changing daily

No.	Champion	Championship change			Reign statistics		Notes	Ref.
No.	Champion	Date	Event	Location	Reign	Days	Notes	Ref.
1	Art Barr	November 21, 1987	House show	Portland, Oregon	1	35	Won a nine-man battle royal to become the first champion.	
2	Abbuda Dein	December 26, 1987	House show	Portland, Oregon	1	<1		
3	The Assassin	December 26, 1987	House show	Portland, Oregon	1	35		
—	Vacated	January 30, 1988	—	—	—	—	Title vacated for undocumented reasons	
4	Colonel DeBeers	August 16, 1988	House show	Portland, Oregon	1	(Note: The exact date Col. DeBeers was stripped of the championship is uncertain, which puts the title reign at between 16 and 45 days.)	Defeated Steve Doll in a tournament final to win the vacant title.	
—	Vacated	September 1988	—	—	—	—	Title vacated when DeBeers failed to defend it in 30 days.	
5	Al Madril	October 9, 1988	House show	Finley, Washington	1	20	Won a tournament to win the vacant title.	
6	Top Gun	October 29, 1988	House show	Portland, Oregon	2	77	Previously held the championship under the name "The Assassin"	
7	Abbuda Dein	January 14, 1989	House show	Portland, Oregon	2	14		
8	Carl Styles	January 28, 1989	House show	Portland, Oregon	2	77		
—	Vacated	April 15, 1989	—	—	—	—	Title vacated when Styles is injured.	
9	Al Madril	October 14, 1989	House show	Portland, Oregon	2	42	Won a tournament to win the vacant title.	
10	Rex King	November 25, 1989	House show	Portland, Oregon	1	61		
11	Al Madril	January 25, 1990	House show	Salem, Oregon	3	30		
12	Ricky Santana	February 24, 1990	House show	Portland, Oregon	1	21		
13	Scotty the Body	March 17, 1990	House show	Portland, Oregon	1	198		
—	Deactivated	October 1, 1990	—	—	—	—	Title abandoned by PNW	
14	Buddy Highway	January 10, 2015	House show	Portland, Oregon	1	176	Awarded reactivated title when Blue Collar Wrestling joins the NWA.	
15	Keith Atkins	July 5, 2015	House show	Portland, Oregon	1	56		
16	Lonestar	August 30, 2015	House show	Portland, Oregon	1	364		
17	Jameson Moonshine	August 28, 2016	House show	Portland, Oregon	1	112		
18	Lance Dean	December 18, 2016	House show	Portland, Oregon	1	49		
19	Ares Toretto	February 5, 2017	House show	Portland, Oregon	1	56		
20	Zack Winters	April 2, 2017	House show	Portland, Oregon	1	70		
21	Lonestar	June 11, 2017	House show	Portland, Oregon	1	112		
—	Deactivated	October 1, 2017	—	—	—	—	Title vacated when BCW closes.	
