= Leroy Howard =

American professional wrestler (1968 – 2018)

Personal information
- Born: Leroy Anthony Howard; August 5, 1968 Statesboro, Georgia, United States
- Died: October 8, 2018 (aged 50) St. Petersburg, Florida

Professional wrestling career
- Ring name(s): Leroy Howard; Navy Seal; Black Navy Seal; Rastaman; Terrance Black; Anthony Howard; Reggae Man
- Billed height: 5 ft 11 in (1.80 m)
- Billed weight: 276 lb (125 kg; 19.7 st)
- Trained by: Jimmy Del Ray
- Debut: 1990
- Retired: 2013

Leroy Howard (August 5, 1968 – October 8, 2018) was a professional wrestler known as Navy Seal who worked for World Championship Wrestling, World Wrestling Federation, Battlarts in Japan, Germany, Puerto Rico and the independent circuit in Florida.

== Professional wrestling career ==
After serving as a member of the US Navy, Howard made his professional wrestling debut in 1990. He worked for World Wrestling Federation in 1993 and 1995 having matches against Bob Backlund, Jeff Jarrett, King Kong Bundy, Owen Hart, Yokozuna and Kama.

Also in 1993, Howard made his debut for World Championship Wrestling where worked until 1998. he faced against Sid Vicious, Rick Rude, Triple H, Arn Anderson, Steve Austin, Paul Orndorff, Steve Austin, and Bill Goldberg.

After leaving WCW in 1998, Howard worked in the independent circuit based in Florida for IPW Hardcore Wrestling and NWA Florida as the Navy Seal. On November 13, 1998 he lost to NWA Florida Champion Dory Funk Jr. In 1999, he made his debut in Japan for Battlarts as the Rastaman. That same year, he worked in Germany for Catch Wrestling Association and Verband der Berufsringer.

In May 1999, Howard started working for IWA Puerto Rico which was partnered with the World Wrestling Federation. He left IWA in 2001 and went to Puerto Rcio's World Wrestling Council where he won the WWC World Tag Team Championship with Mustafa Saed.

After leaving Puerto Rico in 2001, Howard continued working in Florida. In 2006 he made his debut for Florida Pro Wrestling Association based in Pinellas Park.

On January 16, 2009, Howard returned to Japan for one night losing to Ryuji Walter by TKO for The Tempest Dragon 3rd Event in Tokyo.

In 2010, Howard started working for Florida Underground Wrestling based in St. Petersburg and Largo. He wrestled his last match in 2013 and retired from the sport.

== Personal life ==
After retiring from wrestling, Howard worked as a counselor. Howard died on October 8, 2018 at 50.

== Championships and accomplishments ==
- Catch Wrestling Association
  - CWA World Tag Team Championship (1 time, final) - with Ricky Santana
- Independent Professional Wrestling
  - IPW Heavyweight Championship (2 times)
  - IPW Hardcore Championship (1 time)
- Plant City Wrestling Federation
  - PCWF Championship (1 time)
- World Wrestling Council
  - WWC World Tag Team Championship (1 time) - with Mustafa Saed
