= Bruiser Brody Memorial Show =

1988 professional wrestling event

The Bruiser Brody Memorial Show was a professional wrestling supercard held by Giant Baba and All Japan Pro Wrestling as a tribute to wrestler Bruiser Brody at Budokan Hall in Tokyo, Japan, on August 29, 1988. His wife and son were present at the event and his widow, Barbara Goodish, presented her late husband's chain to Stan Hansen so he could wear it in remembrance of Brody during his matches. The show received much attention from the Japanese press and, according to the Wrestling Observer, the media coverage "turned into almost an Elvis Presley type of thing as the magazines are still filled with Brody photos four weeks after his death and on Baba's show they mention his name dozens of times each hour". The show was attended by 16,300 fans and raised $70,000, most of which was donated to Brody's family.

== Show results ==
=== Bruiser Brody Memorial ===
August 29, 1988, in Tokyo, Japan (Budokan Hall)

No.	Results	Stipulations	Times
1	Mitsuo Momota defeated Tsuyoshi Kikuchi	Singles match	07:24
2	Isao Takagi defeated Tatsumi Kitamura	Singles match	06:42
3	Mighty Inoue and Isamu Teranishi defeated Motoshi Okuma and Haruka Eigen by disqualification	Tag team match	09:55
4	Toshiaki Kawada and Yoshinari Ogawa defeated Masanobu Fuchi and Kenta Kobashi	Tag team match	09:38
5	Shinichi Nakano and Akira Taue defeated Rocky Iaukea and The V	Tag team match	11:22
6	The Great Kabuki defeated Goro Tsurumi	Singles match	05:24
7	Wajima Hiroshi and Takashi Ishikawa defeated Tom Zenk and Jerry Oates	Tag team match	15:36
8	Jimmy Snuka and Johnny Ace defeated Tiger Mask and Shinichi Nakano	Tag team match	10:10
9	Giant Baba defeated Rusher Kimura	Singles match	11:20
10	Stan Hansen defeated Abdullah the Butcher by disqualification	Singles match	10:39
11	Genichiro Tenryu and Ashura Hara defeated Jumbo Tsuruta and Yoshiaki Yatsu	Tag team match for the World Tag Team Championship	29:51
