= Lou Fabiano =

American professional wrestler

Personal information
- Born: October 23, 1963 (age 62) Long Island, New York, United States

Professional wrestling career
- Ring name(s): Lou Fabiano; Mohammed Hussien; Sheik Fabbiano; New York Brawler; Sheik Ali
- Billed height: 6 ft 0 in (1.83 m)
- Billed weight: 275 lb (125 kg)
- Billed from: Middle East (Mohammed Hussian)
- Trained by: Wild Samoans (Afa and Sika)
- Debut: 1985
- Retired: 2015

Lou Fabiano is an American professional wrestler who has competed in North American promotions including the American Wrestling Association, International World Class Championship Wrestling, United States Wrestling Association and World Championship Wrestling during the late 1980s and early 1990s as well as the Puerto Rican-based promotion World Wrestling Council as Mohammed Hussien.

== Career ==
Began his professional wrestling career in 1985 for American Wrestling Association. He worked for International World Class Championship Wrestling from 1985 to 1988 in Maine, Massachusetts and Southern Ontario. Fabiano made a few appearances for the World Wrestling Federation in early 1989. In 1989, Fabiano worked during the later days of Continental Wrestling Federation in Alabama. Later that year, he made his debut as the New York Brawler in Memphis for United States Wrestling Association. In 1991, Fabiano made his debut for World Championship Wrestling.

In 1992, Fabiano went to Puerto Rico to work for the World Wrestling Council as Mohammed Hussien being billed from the Middle East. This is where he teamed with Fidel Sierra as La Conexion Comunista. They won the WWC World Tag Team Championship twice together. Fabiano became a ten-time WWC World Tag Team Champion teaming with numerous partners from 1992 to 1994. He won the titles three times with the Tahitian Warrior.

In 1993, he worked in Japan for W*ING.

Later in his career Fabiano continued working in Puerto Rico and the independents mainly in New England. Sometimes he worked as Sheik Ali. He retired from wrestling in 2015.

== Championships and accomplishments ==
- World Wrestling Council
  - WWC Puerto Rico Heavyweight Championship (1 time)
  - WWC World Tag Team Championship (8 times) - with El Vigilante (1), Dusty Wolfe (1), Don Sanders (1), Huracan Castillo Jr. (1), Fidel Sierra (2) and Tahitian Warrior (2)
