= Cocoa Samoa =

American-Samoan professional wrestler (1945–2007)

Personal information
- Born: Ulualoaiga Onosai Tuaolo Emelio; March 9, 1945 Pago Pago, American Samoa
- Died: January 9, 2007 (aged 61) Killeen, Texas, United States

Professional wrestling career
- Ring name(s): Cocoa Samoa; Sabu the Wildman; High Chief Onasahi; Tami Samoa; The Black Ninja; Jack Snuka
- Billed height: 5 ft 11 in (180 cm)
- Billed weight: 238 lb (108 kg)
- Debut: 1976
- Retired: 1997

Ulualoaiga Onosai Tuaolo Emelio (March 9, 1945 – January 9, 2007) was an American Samoan professional wrestler, better known by his ring name Cocoa Samoa.

== Professional wrestling career ==
He began his training by studying martial arts in Japan. His had his first matches in Japanese promotions.

On November 15, 1982, as Sabu the Wildman, Cocoa partnered with Jimmy Hart to defeat Jerry Lawler in a handicap match for the AWA Southern Heavyweight Championship. Hart got the pin, but Sabu the Wildman was recognized as champion. He, however, was defeated by Terry Taylor for the title two weeks later.

By the mid-1980s he wrestled in the World Wrestling Council and Championship Wrestling from Florida. By the late 1980s he worked for the NWA Pacific Northwest Wrestling promotion under the name Cocoa Samoa. In the summer of 1986, Samoa traded the NWA Pacific Northwest Heavyweight Championship with Rip Oliver, holding it one time. He also held the NWA Pacific Northwest Tag Team Championship three times between March 1986 and May 1987, with partners Brady Boone, Ricky Santana, and Mike Miller. Also in Northwest, Samoa had a feud with Jimmy Snuka. After 1988, he look a hiatus from wrestling.

In 1994, Samoa returned to wrestling working in Puerto Rico. Later in his career he worked in the independent circuit and All Pro Wrestling in California until retiring in 1997.

== Personal life ==
Samoa established a janitorial company to provide jobs to homeless people. He also worked for motorcycle companies, offering publicity by making cross-country rides. He spent time in prison after working as a money collector for a drug dealer. After being released from prison, Samoa became a preacher and visited other inmates to preach about Christianity.

He estimated that he had fathered 11 children by nine different women. At the time of his death, however, he was married to a woman named Esperanza and had five known sons and three daughters. He had 31 grandchildren and three great-grandchildren. During his career, he befriended other wrestlers such as Harley Race and Antonio Inoki. He was also close friends with Jimmy Snuka, whom he referred to as his brother.

Samoa died on January 9, 2007.

== Championships and accomplishments ==
- Continental Wrestling Association
  - AWA Southern Heavyweight Championship (1 time)
- NWA Mid-America
  - NWA Mid-America Heavyweight Championship (1 time)
- Pacific Northwest Wrestling
  - NWA Pacific Northwest Heavyweight Championship (1 time)
  - NWA Pacific Northwest Tag Team Championship (3 times)
