= Timothy Well =

American professional wrestler (1961 – 2017)

Personal information
- Born: Timothy Alan Smith; September 8, 1961 Geneva, New York, U.S.
- Died: January 9, 2017 (aged 55) Greenup, Kentucky, U.S.
- Cause of death: Kidney failure

Professional wrestling career
- Ring name(s): Mark Smith; Rex King; Timothy Well
- Billed height: 6 ft 0 in (183 cm)
- Billed weight: 246 lb (112 kg)
- Trained by: Dean Malenko
- Debut: 1987
- Retired: 2004

Timothy Alan Smith (September 8, 1961 – January 9, 2017) was an American professional wrestler, better known by the ring names Rex King and Timothy Well. He wrestled in several promotions, including All Japan Pro Wrestling, World Championship Wrestling, and the World Wrestling Federation (WWF). Much of his career was spent wrestling as a tag team with Steve Doll throughout his career. While in WWF, they were known as Well Dunn.

== Professional wrestling career ==
=== Early career (1987) ===
Smith made his professional wrestling debut in 1987 where he worked for both World Wrestling Federation and Jim Crockett Promotions as Rex King. He lost to Ultimate Warrior on WWF Wrestling Challenge on December 10.

=== Southern Rockers/Well Dunn (1987-1995) ===
Smith gained his first championship success while competing for Pacific Northwest Wrestling (PNW). He formed a tag team with Steve Doll, who was competing as one-half of the Southern Rockers with Scott Peterson. Smith, competing as Rex King, replaced Peterson. The new Southern Rockers won the NWA Pacific Northwest Heavyweight Championship four times from 1989 to 1990. King also has success as a singles wrestler, as he won the NWA Pacific Northwest Heavyweight Championship by defeating Scotty The Body, and NWA Pacific Northwest Television Championship during this period.

King and Doll left PNW in February 1990 to compete for the United States Wrestling Association (USWA). They held the USWA World Tag Team Championship three times together before Doll returned to PNW. King remained in USWA, took on a new partner, Joey Maggs, and won the title belts for a fourth time. He then moved to Puerto Rico to compete for the World Wrestling Council (WWC). Teaming with Ricky Santana, he won the WWC World Tag Team Championship twice. Doll then joined King in Puerto Rico, and they won the tag team title together on June 24, 1992. After vacating the title due to a controversial match, King replaced Doll with Ray González to win the championship for a fourth time.

King and Doll were not apart for long, however, as they returned to the USWA and won the tag team titles for the fourth time as a team and King's fifth time altogether. In 1993, they joined the World Wrestling Federation, where the WWF renamed the team: Smith became known as Timothy Well, and Doll became Steven Dunn; together, the team was known as Well Dunn. Their ring attire led wrestling author RD Reynolds to state that the team was "proof positive that bow ties and thongs do not match". Well Dunn competed against such teams as The Smoking Gunns and Men on a Mission. Shortly after their debut, however, Well sustained an injury and the team left the WWF.

Well Dunn returned to the WWF in 1994 and continued facing the promotions top teams, including The Headshrinkers, who held the WWF Tag Team Championship. When the title was vacated later that year, Well Dunn entered a tournament to determine the new champions. They were eliminated in the first round by Bob Holly and the 1-2-3 Kid, however. The team's biggest feud in the WWF was with The Bushwhackers. Matches between the teams were featured on the company's primary television show, Monday Night Raw, as well as a compilation video released by the WWF.

=== Puerto Rico and Japan (1995-1997) ===
Well Dunn left the WWF in 1995 after losing matches to several of the company's top teams. The team parted ways, and Smith returned to the ring name Rex King. Returning to Puerto Rico, he held the WWC Television Championship twice in 1995. Later that year, he took the place of Shane Sewell as a member of the Canadian Glamour Boys Tag Team with Sean Morley. They won the promotion's tag team title on November 26, 1995, and held it until the following March. After they lost the belts, Morley resumed teaming with Sewell.

After Puerto Rico, Smith also worked for All Japan Pro Wrestling from 1996 to 1997.

=== WCW and ECW (1996-1998) ===
From 1996 to 1998, he worked for World Championship Wrestling as a jobber and Extreme Championship Wrestling in 1998.

=== Later career (1998-2004) ===
King reunited with Doll in 1998 to win the MCW North American Tag Team Championship in Tennessee's Music City Wrestling (MCW). Immediately after the match, however, Reno Riggins came to the ring, joined with Doll in attacking King, and took King's place as tag team champion. King returned to competing for WWC in Puerto Rico, where he defeated Jose Rivera Jr. on February 12, 2000, to win the WWC Puerto Rico Heavyweight Championship. While still holding the Puerto Rican title, he also won the Television Championship for a third time, defeating Glamour Boy Shane (Sewell) for the belt on March 19. One week later, he lost the Puerto Rican title, but he held the Television Championship for over a year. In September 2001, King sustained an injury while competing in Puerto Rico, during a match with Mustafa Saed, and retired as a full-time wrestler, although he returned to wrestle on some independent shows until 2004.

== Personal life ==
On February 20, 2012, the website for World Wrestling Council reported that Smith died. A week later, it was confirmed to be false, as Smith gave an interview with Canada's Slam! Wrestling website, confirming he was still alive and well.

In July 2016, Smith was named part of a class action lawsuit filed against WWE which alleged that wrestlers incurred traumatic brain injuries during their tenure and that the company concealed the risks of injury. The suit was litigated by attorney Konstantine Kyros, who has been involved in a number of other lawsuits against WWE. After his death, the lawsuit was dismissed by US District Judge Vanessa Lynne Bryant in September 2018.

== Death ==
On January 9, 2017, Smith died of a heart attack at his home in Greenup, Kentucky. A GoFundMe campaign that was set up by his mother for Smith's funeral stated that he had died "from complications from his WWF/WCW 22 year career” and that he had “been incapacitated for last several years.” After his death, his lawyer reported that he had been found to have had chronic traumatic encephalopathy.

== Championships and accomplishments ==
- Music City Wrestling
  - MCW North American Tag Team Championship (1 time) - with Steve Dunn
- Pacific Northwest Wrestling
  - NWA Pacific Northwest Heavyweight Championship (1 time)
  - NWA Pacific Northwest Tag Team Championship (4 times) - with Steve Doll
  - NWA Pacific Northwest Television Championship (1 time)
- United States Wrestling Association
  - USWA World Tag Team Championship (5 times) - with Joey Maggs (1 time) and Steve Doll (4 times)
- World Wrestling Council
  - WWC Puerto Rico Heavyweight Championship (1 time)
  - WWC Television Championship (3 times)
  - WWC World Tag Team Championship (5 times) - with Ricky Santana (2 times), Steve Doll (1 time), Ray Gonzalez (1) and Glamour Boy Sean (1 time)
