= Dusty Wolfe =

American professional wrestler

Personal information
- Born: Barry Dale Wolfe; July 18, 1962 (age 64) San Antonio, Texas, United States
- Education: Texas A&M University; Sam Houston State University

Professional wrestling career
- Ring name(s): Dale Wolfe; Doink the Clown; Dusty Wolfe; Mr. Wrestling III; Original Medic
- Billed height: 5 ft 11 in (180 cm)
- Billed weight: 215 lb (98 kg)
- Trained by: Ken Johnson
- Debut: July 5, 1982
- Retired: 2012

Dusty Wolfe (born Barry Dale Wolfe on July 18, 1962), occasionally billed as Dale Wolfe and occasionally appearing as Doink the Clown, is an American retired professional wrestler.

== Professional wrestling career ==
Wolfe was trained by fellow wrestler Ken Johnson, who helped Shawn Michaels enter professional wrestling (Johnson was later a co-owner of Texas Wrestling Academy with Michaels). He debuted on July 5, 1982 in San Antonio, Texas.

Wolfe is best known for his long tenure as a jobber in what was then known as the WWF, making his debut there as Dusty Wolfe in March 1987. In June 1989, WWF began billing him as Dale Wolfe so as to distinguish him from Dusty Rhodes, who had just left World Championship Wrestling (WCW) for the WWF (the two wrestled each other on television later that year). During his time in the WWF, Wolfe wrestled as both a babyface and a heel. He was respected for his ability to work with, and put over, major stars, working with many of the WWF's top names from 1987 to 1993.

He also wrestled for Fritz Von Erich in World Class Championship Wrestling (WCCW), and appeared frequently in the NWA territories and independently, where he would typically appear near the top of the bill. Wolfe also worked for the World Wrestling Council (WWC) in Puerto Rico where he was a two-time tag team champion. From 1993 to 1994 he worked in India and Japan's Network Of Wrestling.

From late 1995 to early 1996, he made several appearances in World Championship Wrestling at WCW Saturday Night TV tapings. Wolfe remained under contract with WCW until 1998, his last appearance being a lost to Chip Minton on the December 19, 1998 edition of WCW Worldwide.

Wolfe is one of five people licensed to wrestle as Doink the Clown.

== Later life ==
After retiring completely from wrestling, Wolfe attended the San Antonio branch of Texas A&M University, where his grades were sufficient to qualify him for membership in the Phi Alpha Theta Honor Society; in 2012, he graduated with a bachelor's degree in history. He then attended Sam Houston State University, where he obtained a master's degree. He has taught history classes at Northwest Vista College since 2015.

Wolfe has published a number of books and essays about the wrestling industry since 2008. Wolfe is married and has four children (one of whom is named after wrestler Dick Murdoch).

== Championships and accomplishments ==
- Flemish Wrestling Force
  - FWF Tag Team Championship (1 time) - with Rob Raw
- NWA New Zealand/Steve Rickard promotions
  - Asian Jr. Heavyweight Championship (1 time)
- Southeastern Championship Wrestling
  - SCW Open Champion (1 time)
  - SCW Tag Team Championship (2 times) - with James Claxton (1) and Ken Johnson (1)
- World Class Championship Wrestling
  - WCCW Heavyweight Championship (90’s Arkansas version) (1 time)
- World Wrestling Council
  - WWC World Tag Team Championship (1 time) - with Mohammed Hussein
- Xtreme Championship Wrestling
  - XCW Ironman Championship (1 time)

== Published works ==
- Journal Of A Journeyman (2008), ISBN 978-1440429866
- The Wrestling Journeyman: Life and Times of an Indy Wrestler (2016), ISBN 978-1523915149
