= Fidel Sierra =

Cuban professional wrestler (born 1960)

Personal information
- Born: David Canal; July 27, 1960 (age 66) Cuba
- Spouses: Crystal McLaughlin (m. 1978; div. 1980) Trisa Samowski (m. 1982; div. 1985) Mary Harrison (m. 1987; div. 1990) Fantasy (m. 1992)
- Children: 3
- Family: Bill Alfonso (cousin)

Professional wrestling career
- Ring name(s): El Hombre De La Habana, Cuba; El Sanguinario Cubano; El Cubanísimo; El Cubano; The Assassin; The Boricua; The Cuban Assassin; David Patterson; David Sierra; The Destroyer; Especialista II; Fidel Barrio; Fidel Sierra; Top Gun
- Billed height: 6 ft 2 in (1.88 m)
- Billed weight: 265 lb (120 kg; 18.9 st)
- Billed from: Parts Unknown (as Top Gun)
- Trained by: Hiro Matsuda
- Debut: 1978

David Canal (born July 27, 1960) is a Cuban professional wrestler better known by his ring name "The Cuban Assassin (El Sanguinario Cubano)" Fidel Sierra. He is notable for being a longtime veteran of the Puerto Rico-based World Wrestling Council as well as for his appearances in World Championship Wrestling and Pacific Northwest Wrestling during the 1980s and 1990s. He wrestled under the name The Cuban Assassin towards the end of his career.

== Early life ==
Sierra was born in Cuba, but moved to the United States with his family when he was a year old. His mother was Cuban and his father was Spanish.

== Professional wrestling career ==
=== Early career (1978–1989) ===
Sierra was trained by Hiro Matsuda in Tampa, Florida. Made his professional wrestling debut in Texas as David Patterson in April 1978.

Sierra has worked for Puerto Rico's World Wrestling Council (WWC) since 1985, as both a wrestler and a backstage worker. He also wrestled all over the United States, including in Dallas, Texas for the Von Erich family, in Mid-Atlantic Championship Wrestling for Jim Crockett, Jr., in Florida and Georgia, and for Don Owen in Portland, Oregon. He has also competed in Stampede Wrestling in Canada, in the Dominican Republic, and in Japan, via his association with the National Wrestling Alliance. In Japan, he competed against the likes of Andre the Giant, Antonio Inoki, and Tatsumi Fujinami. He also competed under a mask in Mexico as The Boricua until he lost a Mask vs. Mask match to Pierroth Jr.

While wrestling under the ring name 'Top Gun', Sierra faced Ric Flair in a match that ended in a 60-minute time limit draw.

=== World Championship Wrestling (1989-2000) ===
Sierra also wrestled in World Championship Wrestling (WCW) as 'Fidel Sierra', making appearances between 1989 and 2000. He is known for a feud with Jim Duggan provoked by international tensions between the United States and Cuba. In WCW, Fidel Sierra regularly teamed with Ricky Santana. Originally billed as The Cuban Connection (a name they first used in Bill Watts' UWF where they feuded with the Sheepherders) the duo were renamed The Barrio Brothers (Ricky Barrio and Fidel Barrio) in the mid-1990s in an effort to appear more up-to-date. Sierra and Santana also performed in WCW wearing masks and full-body suits as Los Especialistas (Especialista I and Especialista II). Their identities were revealed on-air on the live Main Event pre-show of Clash of the Champions XXXI, when they were unmasked by The Nasty Boys following a match. In 2000, as Fidel Sierra, he feuded over (although never winning) the WCW TV title with Jim Duggan on WCW Saturday Night.

=== World Wrestling Federation (1993-1995) ===
In between his WCW appearances, Sierra also wrestled several matches for the World Wrestling Federation in 1993, 1994 and 1995. He worked in house shows as 'The Cuban Terrorist' against Typhoon in March 1993. In October of that year he wrestled as a member of a series of matches teaming with Gangrel and Little Louise against Tiger Jackson and The Bushwhackers. Under the name 'Fidel Sierra', he made his first TV appearance on the February 5, 1994 episode of WWF Superstars, teaming with Barry Horowitz in a loss to The 1-2-3 Kid and Marty Jannetty. He then teamed with Ricky Santana in two tryout matches at WWF TV tapings that June, though the pair was not signed. Sierra would make two more appearances on WWF television in 1995 as 'David Sierra', losing to Aldo Montoya on the January 30 episode of Monday Night Raw and once again teaming with Barry Horowitz to lose to Men on a Mission on the February 9 edition of WWF Wrestling Challenge.

=== Later career (2000–present) ===
After WCW, Sierra would wrestle in the independents, mainly in Florida. Also made numerous returns to Puerto Rico. As of 2025, he still wrestles.

=== Gimmicks ===
While wrestling in Canada as "Crazy" David Patterson, Sierra asked permission from the original Cuban Assassin, Ángel Acevedo, to use the 'Cuban Assassin' character, to which Acevedo agreed, on the condition that Sierra did not use the name or gimmick in Japan.

== Personal life ==
Sierra is married to Fantasy, his long-time manager. She is his fourth wife, and as of 2022, the pair have been married for 30 years. Sierra has two daughters and a son. Sierra and his wife own a sports bar, Crazy Dave's Sports Bar, in Largo, Florida.

== Championships and accomplishments ==
- American Championship Wrestling
  - ACW Tag Team Championship (1 time) - with Col. Payne
- Cauliflower Alley Club
  - Men's Wrestling Award (2017)
- Championship Wrestling from Florida
  - NWA Florida Heavyweight Championship (1 time)
- Championship Wrestling U.S.A.
  - CWUSA International Heavyweight Championship (1 time)
- Florida Underground Wrestling
  - NWA FUW Heavyweight Championship (1 time)
  - FUW Cuban Heavyweight Championship (3 times)
- Impact Pro Wrestling
  - IPW Heavyweight Championship (1 time)
- International Wrestling Association
  - IWA Tag Team Championship (1 time) - with Miguel Perez, Jr., Huracan Castillo, Pain and Ricky Banderas as Los Intocables
- Pacific Northwest Wrestling
  - NWA Pacific Northwest Heavyweight Championship (4 times)
  - NWA Pacific Northwest Tag Team Championship (8 times) - with Rip Oliver (5), Dynamite Kid (1), Bobby Jaggers (1), and Scotty The Body (1)
  - NWA Pacific Northwest Television Championship (2 times)
- Ring Around The Northwest Newsletter
  - Wrestler of the Year (1988)
- World Wrestling Council
  - WWC Caribbean Heavyweight Championship (4 times)
  - WWC Puerto Rico Heavyweight Championship (3 times)
  - WWC Television Championship (2 times)
  - WWC World Tag Team Championship (4 times) - with Ricky Santana (2), The Mexican Angel (1) and Mohammed Hussein (1)
  - WWC North American Heavyweight Championship (1 time)
- Other titles
  - CWO Eastern States Tag Team Championship (2 times) - with Beau James (1) and Cuban Militia (1)

== Lucha de Apuesta record ==
Winner (wager)	Loser (wager)	Location	Event	Date	Notes
Pierroth Jr. (mask)	El Boricua (mask)	Mexico City	CMLL 62nd Anniversary Show (2)	September 29, 1995	
