= Mike Miller (wrestler) =

American professional wrestler

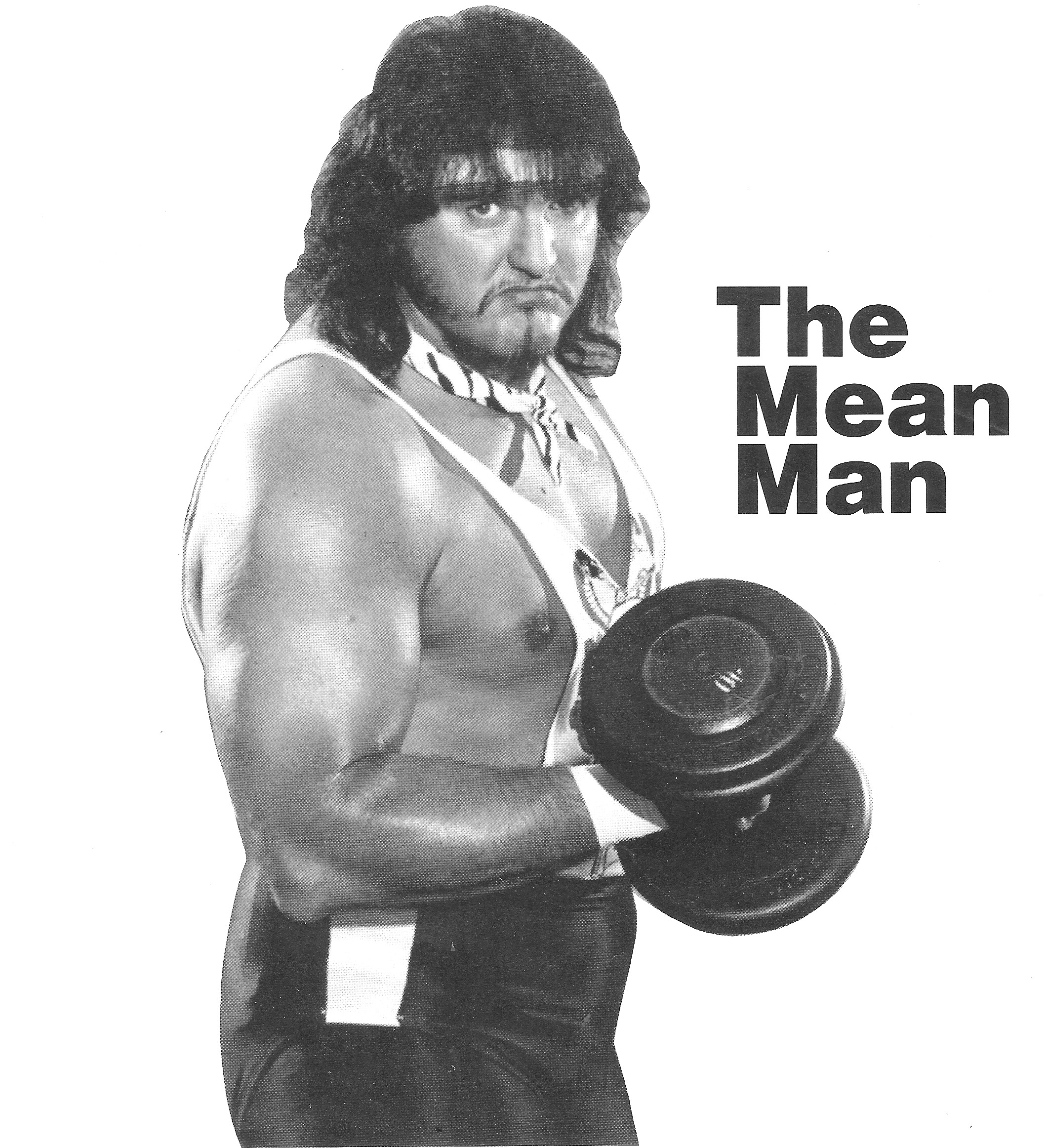
- Miller, circa 1988

Personal information
- Born: James Michael Hillman; October 14, 1951 (age 75) Memphis, Tennessee, U.S.

Professional wrestling career
- Ring name(s): Mike Miller; King Killer
- Billed height: 6 ft 2 in (1.88 m)
- Billed weight: 255 lb (116 kg)
- Trained by: Herb Welch
- Debut: 1977
- Retired: c. 1996

James Michael Hillman (born October 14, 1951), better known by the ring name "Mean" Mike Miller, is an American professional wrestler who had great success in Pacific Northwest Wrestling. He was brought in to professional wrestling by Herb Welch. In Pacific Northwest Wrestling he wrestled for many years and held the NWA Pacific Northwest Heavyweight Championship and NWA Pacific Northwest Tag Team Championship a combined 11 times. During his career Mean Mike faced many wrestling legends such as Rip Oliver, Bobby Jaggers, Tom Prichard, Jerry Lawler, Chief Jay Strongbow, Brett Sawyer, Billy Jack Haynes, and Steve Doll.

== Championships and accomplishments ==
- Pacific Northwest Wrestling
  - NWA Pacific Northwest Heavyweight Championship (3 times)
  - NWA Pacific Northwest Tag Team Championship (8 times) - with Tom Jones (2), Karl Steiner (1), Moondog Moretti (1), Abbuda Dein (2), Rip Oliver (1) and Black Ninja (1)
- Ring Around the Northwest Newsletter
  - Tag Team of the Year (1985–1986) with Karl Steiner and Abudda Dein

== See also ==
- Pacific Northwest Wrestling alumni
