= NWA North American Tag Team Championship =

Professional wrestling tag team championship

Details
- Promotion: National Wrestling Alliance
- Date established: August 1995
- Current champions: Action Attraction (Matt Justyce and Action Jackson)
- Date won: May 2, 2015

Other name
- MCW North American Tag Team Championship
Statistics
- First champion: The Moondogs
- Most reigns: (As a Tag Team) Tennessee Volunteers (Reno Riggins and Steven Dunn (6 reigns) (As Individual) Steven Dunn (7 reigns)
- Longest reign: U.N. of Devastation (Bad News Johnson and Drake Tungsten (392 days)
- Shortest reign: James Storm and Shane Eden (5 days)

The NWA North American Tag Team Championship is an inactive professional wrestling tag team championship that was used and defended in various territories throughout the National Wrestling Alliance., prior to its being purchased in 2017 by Billy Corgan. This is the fifth NWA sanctioned championship to bear this name. Unlike its predecessors, each of which was only used in a specific territory, this title is defended in NWA territories throughout the world in much the same way as the NWA World Tag Team Championship. Also, as with the NWA World Tag Team Championship, the title is ultimately controlled by the NWA Board of Directors and title changes occur only when a majority of the board votes to do so. Originally, the championship was called the MCW North American Tag Team Championship and was defended in Music City Wrestling based out of Nashville, Tennessee.

== Title History ==
Wrestlers:	Reigns together:	Date:	Place:	Notes:
MCW North American Tag Team Championship
Moondogs	1	August 1995		
J. C. Ice and Doug Gilbert	1	June 1997		
The Centerfolds (Kenny and Keith Arden)	1	June 10, 1997	Nashville, Tennessee	
Colorado Kid and Scufflin Hillbilly	1	June 27, 1997	Lebanon, Tennessee	
The Centerfolds (Kenny and Keith Arden)	2	November 1997		
Thrillbilly and Shane Eden	1	November 27, 1997	Nashville, Tennessee	
Tennessee Volunteers (Reno Riggins and Steven Dunn)	1	January 27, 1998	Nashville, Tennessee	
Ladies Night Out (Frenchy Riviera and Shane Eden)	1	February 21, 1998	Nashville, Tennessee	
Tennessee Volunteers (Reno Riggins and Steven Dunn)	2	February 28, 1998	Lebanon, Tennessee	Stripped on March 21, 1998 for attacking the promoter.
Ringlords (Speedy Gonzales and Rick Slagle)	1	March 1998	North Carolina	Reigning ASW North American champions and recognized as NWA champions.
Limited Edition (Nick Dinsmore and Rob Conway)	1	April 4, 1998	Nashville, Tennessee	Defeat Tennessee Volunteers, Ladies Night Out and Rock 'n' Roll Express in a four-way match.
Vacated		May 1998		When Dinsmore is injured.
Southern Rockers (Steven Dunn and Rex King)	1	May 30, 1998	Nashville, Tennessee	Defeat Chris Michaels and Shane Eden.
Tennessee Volunteers (Reno Riggins and Steven Dunn)	3	May 30, 1998	Nashville, Tennessee	Reno Riggins and Dunn attack King; Riggins takes King's place on the team. Renamed NWA North American Tag Team Championship soon after.
Vacated		July 25, 1998		
NWA North American Tag Team Championship
MCW Blacksheep (Wolfie D and Flash Flanagan)	1	August 2, 1998	Nashville, Tennessee	
Tennessee Volunteers (Reno Riggins and Steven Dunn)	4	August 29, 1998	Nashville, Tennessee	Held up after a match against Australians (Bill Dundee and Ashley Hudson) on February 5, 1999 in Nashville, TN.
Tennessee Volunteers (Reno Riggins and Steven Dunn)	5	February 6, 1999	Nashville, Tennessee	Defeat Australians in rematch.
Brian Christopher and Spellbinder	1	February 20, 1999	Nashville, Tennessee	
Tennessee Volunteers (Reno Riggins and Steven Dunn)	6	March 25, 1999	Nashville, Tennessee	
Vacated		May 1999		In order to concentrate on the NWA World Tag Team Titles.
Ladies Night Out	2	June 5, 1999	Nashville, Tennessee	Defeated Christian York and Joey Matthews to win the titles.
Chris Michaels and Bart Sawyer	1	July 3, 1999	Nashville, Tennessee	
Vacated		August 1999		
Air Paris and Cassidy O'Reilly	1	August 14, 1999	Nashville, Tennessee	Defeated Ashley Hudson and Corey Williams to win the vacated titles.
New South (Ashley Hudson and Cory Williams)	1	November 27, 1999	Nashville, Tennessee	Titles were awarded.
Air Paris and Big Bully Douglas	1	April 14, 2000	Hopkinsville, Kentucky	
Vacated		September 2000		When the team splits up.
James Storm and Shane Eden	1	February 10, 2001	Nashville, Tennessee	Wins a tournament.
Vacated		February 15, 2001		When the title become inactive.
New Orleans Fight Club (Kevin Northcutt and John Saxon)	1	August 14, 2004	Jackson, Mississippi	Defeated Skeeter Frost and Sal Rinauro in a 4-team tournament final.
Tribal Force (Tim Warcloud and Tejas)	1	April 16, 2005	Ponca City, Oklahoma	
Chris Escobar and Shane Falco	1	October 8, 2005	Nashville, Tennessee	Defeated Warlcoud and Daron Smythe, subbing for Tejas, at the NWA 57th Anniversary Show.
U.N. of Devastation (Bad News Johnson and Drake Tungsten)	1	October 22, 2005	Roanoke, Virginia	Defeated Escobar and Frank Parker, subbing for Falco.
Scotty Blaze and Scotty Rocker	1	November 18, 2006	Danville, Virginia	
Old School Empire (Mike Booth and Preston Quinn)	1	August 12, 2007	Charlotte, North Carolina	
The Wrong Crowd (Brian Anthony and Paul Atlas)	1	January 19, 2008	Ahoskie, North Carolina	
Brandon K and Sterling James Keenan	1	September 6, 2008	McKeesport, Pennsylvania	Defeated The Wrong Crowd (Brian Anthony and Paul Atlas).
Brandon K and Crusher Hansen	1	February 28, 2009	McKeesport, Pennsylvania	Defeated Brandon K for Sterling's half of the title.
Excellence Personified (Brandon K and Scottie Gash)	1	April 11, 2009	McKeesport, Pennsylvania	Defeated Crusher Hansen and James Ross to reunify the titles.
Team MEGA (Ashton Amherst and James Ross)	1	May 22, 2010	McKeesport, Pennsylvania	
Vacated		November 30, 2011		Due to "There's No One Left to Face" From Team MEGA.
Rochester Wrecking Crew (Hellcat and Rob Sweet)	1	December 3, 2011	Rochester, New York	Defeated The Olsen Twins (Jimmy Olsen and Colin Delaney) for the vacated championship. Recognition withdrawn by NWA in February 2013.
Hart and Soul (Teddy Hart and Big Daddy Yum Yum)	1	December 12, 2014	Patterson, Louisiana	Defeated Steve Anthony and Luke Hawx for the vacated championship.
Action Attraction (Matt Justyce and Action Jackson)	1	May 2, 2015	Daisetta, Texas	Defeat Hart and Soul and Pump Patrol Jared Wayne and Curt Matthews in 3-way match, renamed Main Event Pro Wrestling Tag Team Championship as the promotion is no longer associated with the NWA.

== See also ==
- List of National Wrestling Alliance championships
- NWA North American Tag Team Championship (Central States version)
