= Reno Riggins =

American professional wrestler (born 1967)

Personal information
- Born: Neal Hargrove; January 13, 1967 (age 59) Nashville, Tennessee, U.S.

Professional wrestling career
- Ring name: Reno Riggins
- Billed height: 5 ft 11 in (180 cm)
- Billed weight: 229 lb (104 kg)
- Trained by: Tojo Yamamoto
- Debut: 1986
- Retired: 2011

Neal Hargrove, better known by his ring name, Reno Riggins, (born January 13, 1967) is an American retired professional wrestler. Riggins has competed in Southeastern independent promotions including the United States Wrestling Association (USWA) during the 1990s.

== Professional wrestling career ==
Hargrove was the final wrestler to be trained by Tojo Yamamoto before Yamamato's death in 1992.

Hargrove made his World Wrestling Federation (WWF) debut as Reno Riggins in March 1988, spending several years as an enhancement talent, competing against many of the top heels of the time. He also appeared in a dark match losing to Rip Rogers at the NWA's Halloween Havoc in October 1990. Leaving the WWF in 1992, he began competing for the USWA and eventually won the USWA Southern Heavyweight Championship from Brian Christopher in August 1992. After a brief stint in Smoky Mountain Wrestling in early 1993, he returned to the WWF and frequently appeared as an enhancement talent (now as a heel putting over numerous faces) on Monday Night Raw until deciding to retire in early 1995.

Following the close of the USWA in 1997, Hargrove came out of retirement and began teaming with Steven Dunn as "The Tennessee Volunteers" in Music City Wrestling feuding with Flash Flanagan and Wolfie D over the promotion's North American tag team titles (later renamed the NWA North American Tag Team Championship) during the late 1990s. They also made an appearance for the World Wrestling Federation (now World Wrestling Entertainment) on an episode of Shotgun Saturday Night against The Hardy Boyz. Appearing at the first Brian Pillman Memorial Show in 1998, he and Dunn would later compete as "Main Event" in the National Wrestling Alliance eventually winning the NWA World Tag Team titles in Eskan, Saudi Arabia on April 7, 2000. Hargrove now does advertising, commentating and booking for Showtime All-Star Wrestling. He retired from wrestling in 2011.

== Championships and accomplishments ==
- Central Wrestling Federation
  - CWF Tag Team Championship (1 time) - with Krull the Deathstalker
- Music City Wrestling
  - MCW North American Tag Team Championship (3 times) - with Steven Dunn
- National Wrestling Alliance^{1}
  - NWA World Tag Team Championship (1 time) - with Steven Dunn
  - NWA North American Tag Team Championship (1 time) - with Steven Dunn
- NWA Nashville
  - NWA North American Tag Team Championship (2 times) - with Steven Dunn
- Pro Wrestling Illustrated
  - PWI ranked him # 189 of the 500 best singles wrestlers in the PWI 500 in 1998.
- Showtime All-Star Wrestling
  - SAW International Heavyweight Championship (1 time)
- Spectrum Sports
  - Spectrum Sports Heavyweight Championship (1 time)
- United States Wrestling Association

- USWA Southern Heavyweight Championship (1 time)

^{1}His reign as NWA World Tag Team Champion began while wrestling on a card in Saudi Arabia. Records are unclear as for what promotion he wrestled at the time, as they are for when he first became NWA North American Tag Team Champion.
