= Ricky Santana =

Cuban professional wrestler (born 1958)

Personal information
- Born: Ricardo Santana Ortiz; November 21, 1958 (age 67) New York City, U.S.

Professional wrestling career
- Ring name(s): Ricky Santana; Aldo Marino; The Hood; The Iceman; Especialista I Ricky Barrio; Rey Fénix
- Billed height: 5 ft 10 in (1.78 m)
- Billed weight: 235 lb (107 kg; 16.8 st)
- Trained by: Boris Malenko
- Debut: 1982
- Retired: 2020

Ricardo Santana Ortiz (born November 21, 1958), better known as Ricky Santana, is an American retired professional wrestler of Puerto Rican descendent who has previous worked for World Championship Wrestling (WCW), World Wrestling Federation, World Wrestling Council (WWC) and the National Wrestling Alliance (NWA). He is also known for his time in internationally All Japan Pro Wrestling (AJPW), IWA Japan, Consejo Mundial de Lucha Libre (CMLL) and Lucha Libre AAA Worldwide (AAA).

== Professional wrestling career ==
Santana debuted as a wrestler in 1980 after being trained at The Great Malenko wrestling school in south Florida. From 1984 to 1985 Santana worked in the World Wrestling Federation as Aldo Marino. In 1985, Santana worked for NWA Texas Allstar Wrestling in San Antonio. In June 1985, he won the Texas Allstar Tag Team Championship as the Hoods with Tony Torres defeating Shawn Michaels and Paul Diamond, known as the American Force. In March 1986, he began wrestling in NWA Championship Wrestling from Florida, where he first met Fidel Sierra, who would later become his Tag Team partner for many years. A short time later, he went on to Portland for Pacific Northwest Wrestling. On October 4, 1986, he won the NWA Pacific Northwest Tag Team titles with Brady Boone from Mike Miller and Abdudah Dein. He lost the titles back to them on November 10, 1986. He then won the titles with Cocoa Samoa, on January 7, 1987 but lost them to Miller and Rip Oliver in May 1987. He won the NWA Pacific Northwest Heavyweight title from Oliver in March 1987.

After he moved to the World Wrestling Council, he won the Puerto Rican Heavyweight title from Super Black Ninja in San Juan, Puerto Rico, on August 6, 1988. He lost it to Bobby Jaggers in October, but won it back on November 24, 1988. Santana won the WWC World Junior Heavyweight Championship from Profe on January 14, 1989. He lost it to Jonathon Holiday on April 2, 1989, in Caguas, Puerto Rico. Returning to the NWA, he won the Pacific Northwest Television Championship from Al Madril in February 1990. He also won the tag team titles four times with various partners between May 1990 and February 1991.

In August 1991, Santana went to Japan for W*ING under the masked persona, the Iceman. After W*ING folded in 1994, he would use the Iceman gimmick in various Japanese promotions, including IWA Japan and Big Japan Pro Wrestling.

Back in the WWC, he won the World Junior Heavyweight title from Mr. Pogo, on April 20, of either 1990 or 1991. He claimed the championship again from Brad Anderson in May 1991, in Caguas, Puerto Rico. Santana won the WWC Caribbean Tag Team Championships twice, both times with Ray Gonzalez as the Latin Connection. He then won the World Tag Team titles twice with Rex King, on December 25, 1991 and February 29, 1992. He reunited with Gonzalez to win the world titles twice, in February and April 1993. Ortiz won the WWC Television title from Sean Morley, in either 1994 or 1995. He won the World Tag Team titles with Fidel Sierra in 1995, and the Television title from Sweet Brown Sugar in March 1996. Santana and Gonzalez won the World Tag Team titles from Sean Morley and Shane Sewell in May 1996, and Santana won them again with La Ley, in March 1997. He won the WWC Puerto Rican Heavyweight Championship twice, in September and November 1997. In March 1998, he won the World Tag Team titles again, this time with Shane Sewell.

In the Catch Wrestling Association, he won the World Tag Team Championship with Black Navy Seal from Michael Kovac and Dirk Rotzek, on November 27, 1999. Santana won the IWA World Tag Team Championship twice, in January and March 2000. Between 2001 and 2003, Ortiz won the WWC World Tag Team titles three times, the Caribbean Heavyweight Championship twice, and the Television and Puerto Rican Heavyweight titles once each.

Santana has also worked with the creative side as Head of creative for WWC Puerto Rico and IWA Puerto Rico on different occasions throughout the 1990s. Santana joined World Championship Wrestling in October 1999 as a road agent, leaving in June 2000 to take the same position in the World Wrestling Federation. As a road agent, Santana made an on-screen appearance on the 13 September 2001 episode of Smackdown!, the first mass gathering in the United States of America following the September 11 attacks. In a prerecorded talking head segment, Santana spoke about how the attacks had affected him. He would leave the WWF in December 2001.

== Championships and accomplishments ==
- Catch Wrestling Association
  - CWA World Tag Team Championship (1 time, final) - with Black Navy Seal
- Cauliflower Alley Club
  - Men's Wrestling Award (2020)
- International Wrestling Association
  - IWA World Tag Team Championship (2 times) - with Sean Morley (1) and Sean Hill (1)¨
  - IWA North America Heavyweight Championship (1 time)
- NWA Hollywood
  - NWA Americas Tag Team Championship (1 time) - with The Spoiler
  - NWA Los Angeles Tag Team Championship (1 time) - with Ron Starr
- Pacific Northwest Wrestling
  - NWA Pacific Northwest Heavyweight Championship (1 time)
  - NWA Pacific Northwest Tag Team Championship (6 times) - with Coco Samoa (1), Brady Boone (1), Al Madril (1), Brad Anderson (2) and Curtis Thompson (1)
  - NWA Pacific Northwest Television Championship (1 time)
- Ring Around The Northwest Newsletter
  - Tag Team of the Year (1990) with Curtis Thompson
- World Wrestling Council
  - WWC Caribbean Heavyweight Championship (2 times)
  - WWC Caribbean Tag Team Championship (2 times) - with Ray Gonzalez
  - WWC Puerto Rico Heavyweight Championship (5 times)
  - WWC Television Championship (3 times)
  - WWC World Junior Heavyweight Championship (3 times)
  - WWC World Tag Team Championship (10 times) - with Ray González (3), Rex King (2), Fidel Sierra (2), Brent Dail (1), Glamour Boy Shane (1) and Rico Suave (1)

== Luchas de Apuestas record ==
Winner (wager)	Loser (wager)	Location	Event	Date	Notes
Ricky Santana (hair)	El Texano (hair)	Mexico, City	CMLL 61st Anniversary Show	September 30, 1994	
Ricky Santana (hair)	El Texano (hair)	Bayamon, Puerto Rico	WWC show	August 1, 1998	
Ricky Santana (hair)	Apolo Dantes (hair)	Mexico City	CMLL 65th Anniversary Show	September 18, 1998	
Emilio Charles, Jr. and Mascara Año 2000 (hair)	Ricky Santana and El Boricua (hair)	Mexico City	CMLL show	September 25, 1998	
Carly Colón (hair)	Rey Fénix (mask)	Bayamon, Puerto Rico	WWC Crossfire 2013	November 16, 2013	
