= Rip Oliver =

American professional wrestler (1952–2020)

Personal information
- Born: Larry Richard Oliver; October 6, 1952 Homosassa, Florida, U.S.
- Died: March 5, 2020 (aged 67)

Professional wrestling career
- Ring name(s): Rip Oliver; Rick Oliver; Super Ninja; The Gestapo
- Billed height: 6 ft 0 in (183 cm)
- Billed weight: 209 lb (95 kg)
- Debut: 1976
- Retired: October 12, 1991

Larry Richard Oliver (October 6, 1952 – March 5, 2020) was an American professional wrestler, known as "Crippler" Rip Oliver, who had success in Pacific Northwest Wrestling (PNW).

== Early life ==
Oliver was born in Florida. His father was Dennis Lee Oliver (December 1922 – August 1980) and his mother was Sadie Lenore Head Oliver. His parents owned Independent Fish Company, located on Seminole Place on the Homosassa River. His parents are buried in Stagestand Cemetery in Homosassa.

== Professional wrestling career ==
In Pacific Northwest Wrestling (PNW), he set a record for holding the NWA Pacific Northwest Heavyweight Championship more than anyone. Oliver also had many titles in tag team competition, holding the NWA Pacific Northwest Tag Team Championship and the NWA Canadian Tag Team Championship a combined 18 times. In 1985, Oliver went to World Class Championship Wrestling in Dallas, where he was managed by Jim Cornette. Oliver was involved in a story line with Mike Von Erich where he broke Von Erich's arm which led to their big match at Texas Stadium. In 1985 Chris Adams allowed his tag team partner Gino Hernandez to defend the WCCW Television Championship against Billy Jack Haynes, where he lost that title, but Oliver defeated and severely injured Billy to win the television title soon thereafter.

During his many title reigns Oliver faced many wrestlers such as Rocky Johnson, Brett Sawyer, Billy Jack Haynes, Buddy Rose, Bobby Jaggers, Stan Stasiak, Larry Hennig, Curt Hennig, Brian Adams, Jay Youngblood, Steve Regal, Roddy Piper, Tom Zenk, and Buzz Sawyer.

After wrestling in PNW, Oliver began to wrestle for the World Wrestling Federation (WWF) in 1987, and worked mainly as a jobber. During his run, Oliver appeared once on Saturday Night's Main Event XVIII, under a mask going by the name of Super Ninja, challenging Ultimate Warrior for the WWF Intercontinental Championship.

After leaving the WWF Oliver would return to PNW in 1990. He wrestled his last match on October 12, 1991, losing the NWA Pacific Northwest Heavyweight Championship to Demolition Crush.

== Lawsuit ==
In July 2016, Oliver was part of a class action lawsuit filed against WWE which alleged that wrestlers incurred traumatic brain injuries during their tenure and that the company concealed the risks of injury. The suit was litigated by attorney Konstantine Kyros, who has been involved in a number of other lawsuits against WWE. US District Judge Vanessa Lynne Bryant dismissed the lawsuit in September 2018.

== Death ==
In early 2020, it was revealed that Oliver had entered into hospice care due to end-stage heart failure. He died on March 5, 2020, surrounded by his family.

== Championships and accomplishments ==
- NWA All-Star Wrestling
  - NWA Canadian Tag Team Championship (Vancouver version) (2 times) - with Fidel Cortez (1) and Buddy Rose (1)
- Oregon Wrestling Federation
  - OWF Heavyweight Championship (1 time)
- Pacific Northwest Wrestling
  - NWA Pacific Northwest Heavyweight Championship (12 times)
  - NWA Pacific Northwest Tag Team Championship (16 times) - with Fidel Cortez (1), David Sierra (7), Buddy Rose (2), Matt Borne (2), Bobby Jaggers (1), Mike Miller (1), Super Ninja (1), and Larry Oliver (1)
- Ring Around The Northwest Newsletter
  - Tag Team of the Year (1981–1984) with Buddy Rose and The Assassin
  - Wrestler of the Year (1982–1984, 1986)
- World Class Championship Wrestling
  - WCCW Television Championship (1 time)
