= Raven (wrestler) =

American professional wrestler (born 1964)

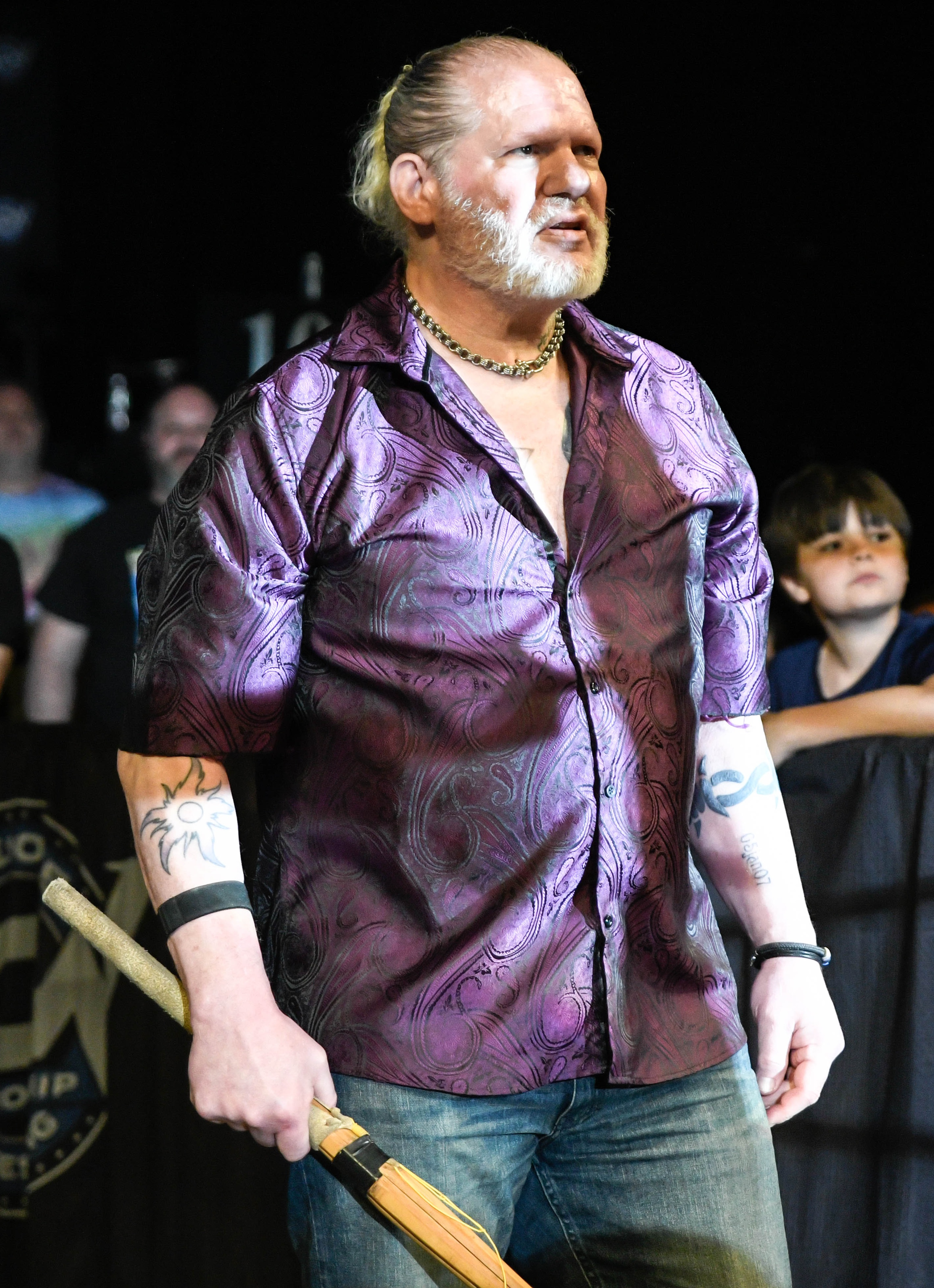
- Raven in 2025

Personal information
- Born: Scott Levy; September 8, 1964 (age 62) Philadelphia, Pennsylvania, U.S.
- Education: University of Delaware
- Website: TheRavenEffect.com

Professional wrestling career
- Ring name(s): Johnny Polo; Matman; Raven; Scott Anthony; Scotty the Body; Scotty Flamingo; Jamie Scott
- Billed height: 6 ft 1 in (185 cm)
- Billed weight: 235 lb (107 kg)
- Billed from: Short Hills, New Jersey; Palm Beach, Florida; The Bowery
- Trained by: Larry Sharpe
- Debut: February 20, 1988

Scott Levy (born September 8, 1964), also known as Raven, is an American professional wrestler who historically competed for Extreme Championship Wrestling (ECW). Besides ECW, he is best known for his appearances with other professional wrestling promotions such as World Championship Wrestling (WCW), the World Wrestling Federation (WWF) / World Wrestling Entertainment (WWE) and NWA Total Nonstop Action (TNA).

Widely recognized as "one of the best talkers in wrestling", Raven is known for his "psychological heel tactics" and grunge-inspired gimmick. His feud with The Sandman in the mid-1990s has been described as "one of the most emotional rivalries in professional wrestling's history". Over the course of his career, he held championships including the ECW World Heavyweight Championship, ECW World Tag Team Championship, NWA World Heavyweight Championship, WCW Light Heavyweight Championship, WCW United States Heavyweight Championship, WCW World Tag Team Championship, and WWF Hardcore Championship 39 times. He was inducted into the TNA Hall of Fame in 2022.

== Early life ==
Levy is of Jewish descent; he was born in Philadelphia, Pennsylvania, the son of Paul F. Levy, a journalist and senior editor of The National Enquirer. He graduated from Lake Worth Community High School in 1982. He went on to attend the University of Delaware, where he earned a degree in criminal justice. He took a semester off from college to enlist in the United States Marine Corps Reserve.

== Professional wrestling career ==
=== Early career (1988–1992) ===
Levy trained as a professional wrestler under Larry Sharpe at the Monster Factory in New Jersey, making his debut on February 20, 1988, against Jimmy Jack Funk.

Early in his career, Levy competed for the World Wrestling Council in Puerto Rico as well as the Memphis, Tennessee-based promotion Continental Wrestling Association under the ring name "Scotty the Body", where he was given the gimmick of being the "boy toy" of Missy Hyatt, who used him to her and Eddie Gilbert's advantage. After leaving Memphis, Levy wrestled in Florida.

Levy next traveled to Canada, where he competed briefly for the Vancouver, British Columbia-based promotion NWA All-Star Wrestling before leaving due to differences with owner Al Tomko. From there, he returned to the United States, joining Pacific Northwest Wrestling in Portland, Oregon. Over the next three years, he was positioned as one of the main heels, winning all of the titles and feuding heavily with Steve Doll. His manager in PNW was Taylor Made. After taking a brief break from competing, he returned to PNW as a face and began a feud with The Grappler. In the summer of 1989, Levy made a number of appearances under a mask as "Matman", a Batman-inspired character who teamed with Beetlejuice.

Wrestling as Scotty the Body, Levy made a one-off appearance on WWF Prime Time Wrestling in a losing effort against Koko B. Ware on October 9, 1990.

After leaving PNW, Levy joined the Dallas, Texas-based Global Wrestling Federation, where he adopted the ring name "Scott Anthony". Levy was part of the stable known as "The Cartel", along with Cactus Jack, Makhan Singh, Rip Rogers and Max Andrews. Levy also served as a color commentator for GWF's televised broadcasts on ESPN alongside play-by-play commentators Craig Johnson and Scott Hudson.

=== World Championship Wrestling (1992–1993) ===
In 1992, Levy joined World Championship Wrestling (WCW). He was given the ring name "Scotty Flamingo" and the gimmick of a surfer from Florida, even carrying a surfboard to the ring. According to him, he did not like the character nor the high flying style, but was forced by the promoters. He was originally managed by J. T. Southern. Levy competed in the WCW light heavyweight division, winning the WCW Light Heavyweight Championship from Brian Pillman on June 20, 1992, at Beach Blast. He held the title until July 5, 1992, when he was defeated by Brad Armstrong. Levy went on to align himself with Diamond Dallas Page and Vinnie Vegas as a member of "The Diamond Mine". Levy would continue to feud with Pillman and Armstrong, before feuding with Johnny B. Badd. At Clash of the Champions XXI on November 18, 1992, Levy defeated Badd in a boxing match via knockout after Vegas surreptitiously weighted his boxing glove by soaking it in water. Levy left WCW in February 1993 after disagreements with booker Bill Watts.

=== World Wrestling Federation (1993–1994) ===
After leaving WCW, Levy briefly wrestled for the United States Wrestling Association (USWA) before joining the World Wrestling Federation (WWF) as manager "Johnny Polo", a spoiled, rich preppy kid. He was initially placed with Adam Bomb, appearing for the first time on May 22 episode of WWF Superstars. He managed Bomb for four months until he was replaced by Harvey Wippleman. He then became the manager of The Quebecers in September, whom he led to three reigns as WWF Tag Team Champions. In addition to managing, Polo also occasionally appeared in tag team and singles competition, facing Jim Powers, Virgil, Rick Steiner, Marty Jannetty, Doink the Clown, 1-2-3 Kid, Owen Hart, and Pierre Ouellet. Polo also worked as a color commentator and co-host of Radio WWF, and behind the scenes worked as the associate producer for Monday Night Raw. Levy left the company in October 1994, his final match losing to Adam Bomb on October 2 in Auburn Hills, Michigan. His last appearance as Johnny Polo was at a house show in Montreal, Quebec on October 21 when he managed Pierre Ouellet in a match against Jacques Rougeau.

=== Extreme Championship Wrestling (1995–1997) ===
==== Feud with Tommy Dreamer (1995–1996) ====
After leaving the WWF, Levy began developing a new character, "Raven". Inspired by the poem by Edgar Allan Poe and by Patrick Swayze's manipulative Zen master of crime in the film Point Break, the Raven character was a depressed, sociopathic, stoical, nihilistic misanthrope who would deliver eloquent, philosophical promos peppered with literary allusions and ending with the catchphrase, "Quoth the Raven 'Nevermore'". Levy dramatically altered his appearance, bulking-up to approximately 235 lbs (107 kg), adding nose and eyebrow piercings and began wrestling in ragged jean shorts, a leather jacket, rock band or comic book t-shirts, combat boots and a flannel tied around his waist. After unsuccessfully pitching the character to Jim Cornette, the owner of Smoky Mountain Wrestling (SMW), Raven approached Paul Heyman, the booker of the Philadelphia, Pennsylvania-based promotion Extreme Championship Wrestling (ECW), who agreed to bring in Raven as a foil for Tommy Dreamer.

I want elimination by any means necessary. Quoth the Raven 'Nevermore'.

— Raven, January 1995

Raven was introduced to ECW by Stevie Richards. In late 1994, Richards had developed an "identity crisis", performing under the ring names "Stevie Flamingo", "Stevie the Body", and "Stevie Polo"—all references to former ring names used by Levy. After sustaining another loss to Tommy Dreamer, Richards became irate and claimed he would present "the real Johnny Polo". Raven made his first appearance on the January 10, 1995 episode of ECW Hardcore TV, with Richards revealing that he had a vendetta against Tommy Dreamer.

Raven formed a stable of lackeys known as "Raven's Nest", with Richards the first member. In February, Johnny Hotbody and Tony Stetson joined the stable, calling Raven the "voice of [their] generation". On March 18, 1995, at Extreme Warfare, Dreamer lost to the four members of Raven's Nest in a gauntlet match.

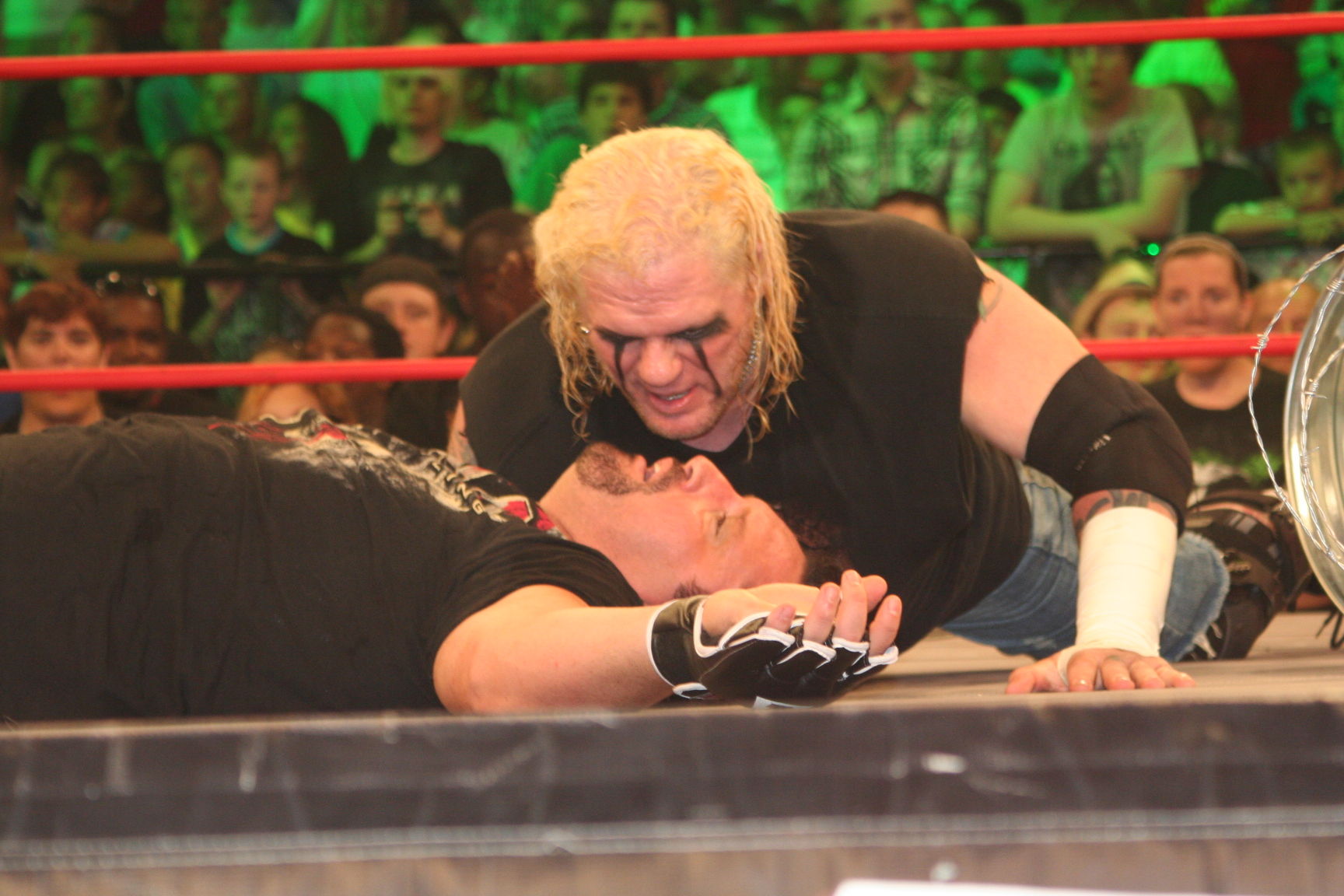
Raven's feud with Tommy Dreamer was a major storyline in ECW.

On April 8, 1995, at Three Way Dance, Raven fired Hotbody and Stetson, replacing them with The Pitbulls. Later that evening, Raven expounded on his history with Dreamer, revealed that they had attended summer camp together as children, where Raven became the boyfriend of Beulah McGillicutty, an overweight girl with acne, after she was spurned by Dreamer. Richards then revealed that he had tracked down McGillicutty, who was now a Penthouse model, who also harbored a grudge against Dreamer. Later that night, Raven faced Dreamer in a singles match for the first time, defeating him following interference from both Richards and McGillicutty. McGillicutty went on to become Raven's valet and onscreen girlfriend, repeatedly interfering in his bouts with Dreamer and receiving numerous piledrivers as a result. McGillicutty was brought into ECW by Raven, who had been introduced to her by Ron Gant in Florida earlier that year and thought she would add a new dimension to his feud with Dreamer. The feud between Raven and Dreamer escalated at Barbed Wire, Hoodies & Chokeslams in June 1995, where Raven's Nest beat down Dreamer's ally, Luna Vachon, before breaking several of Dreamer's fingers. On June 30, 1995, at Mountain Top Madness, Raven and Richards defeated The Public Enemy to win the ECW World Tag Team Championship.

In July 1995 at Hardcore Heaven after Raven and Richards successfully defended the ECW Tag Team Championship against Dreamer and Vachon, The Pitbulls left Raven's Nest, with the Dudley Brothers replacing them shortly thereafter. At Heatwave '95: Rage in the Cage! on July 15, 1995, Dreamer and The Pitbulls defeated Raven and The Dudley Brothers. Later that evening, Dreamer handcuffed Raven and delivered a chair shot later dubbed "the chair shot heard 'round the world." The footage of the chair shot was incorporated into the title sequence of ECW Hardcore TV. At Wrestlepalooza on August 5, 1995, during an eight-man tag team match, Raven, Richards and the Dudley Brothers defeated Tommy Dreamer, Cactus Jack and the Pitbulls after Cactus Jack, Dreamer's long-time ally, turned on him, joining Raven's Nest. On September 16, 1995, at Gangstas Paradise, Raven and Richards lost the ECW World Tag Team Championship to The Pitbulls following interference from Dreamer. Raven and Richards regained the titles from The Pitbulls on October 7, 1995, at South Philly Jam, only to lose them to The Public Enemy later that evening. At November to Remember on November 18, 1995, Dreamer and Terry Funk defeated Raven and Cactus Jack in the main event. At the same event, Raven's Nest received a new member, The Blue Meanie, who became a lackey to Stevie Richards.

At December to Dismember on December 9, 1995, Raven once more defeated Dreamer, although later that night Dreamer, The Pitbulls and The Public Enemy defeated Raven, Richards, The Eliminators and The Heavenly Bodies in an "Ultimate Jeopardy" cage match when Dreamer pinned Richards. At Holiday Hell on December 30, 1995, Raven defeated Dreamer to become number one contender for the ECW World Heavyweight Championship, unsuccessfully challenging incumbent champion The Sandman later that evening. At the same event, The Dudley Brothers left Raven's Nest following a confrontation with Richards. During the build-up to the match, Raven further expounded on his grudge against Dreamer, accusing Dreamer of not having been there for him during his parents' divorce, an accusation that Dreamer hotly denied. At House Party on January 5, 1996, Richards attempted to kiss McGillicutty, who refused, eventually announcing that she was pregnant. After Raven angrily confronted McGillicutty, she informed him that he was not the father, causing Raven to attack Richards. McGillicutty then revealed that Tommy Dreamer was the father, with Dreamer storming the ring and beating down Raven, Richards and The Blue Meanie before embracing Beulah.

==== ECW World Heavyweight Champion (1996–1997) ====
On January 27, 1996, Raven introduced his new valet, Kimona Wanalaya. Later that evening, Raven defeated The Sandman to win his first ECW World Heavyweight Championship following extensive interference from Raven's Nest. Over the following months, Raven successfully defended the ECW World Heavyweight Championship in bouts with opponents including Shane Douglas, Pitbull #2, Chris Jericho, Damián 666, 2 Cold Scorpio and Terry Gordy. Wanalaya left him in April 1996 at Massacre on Queens Boulevard after he slapped her.

At Hardcore Heaven on June 22, 1996, Raven began playing mind games with The Sandman, brainwashing his ex-wife, Lori and his son, Tyler to join Raven's Nest. Lori and Tyler subsequently began accompanying Raven to ringside for his matches, with Raven using him to wage psychological warfare against The Sandman over the following months.

At ECW High Incident on October 26, 1996, Richards was involved in one of ECW's most controversial angles, with Raven's Nest "crucifying" The Sandman by tying him to a cross and placing a crown made of barbed wire on his head. The angle, which was widely criticised as being in poor taste, led to Olympic gold medalist Kurt Angle severing his links with ECW and delayed the promotion's debut on pay-per-view. At the instruction of Paul Heyman, Raven came to the ring and offered a somewhat insincere apology for his actions.

The relationship between Raven and Richards began to deteriorate in late 1996. At Ultimate Jeopardy on October 5, 1996, Raven was scheduled to team with Brian Lee against Dreamer and The Sandman in a match with Raven's ECW World Heavyweight Championship on the line. After Raven was announced as being unable to compete, Richards substituted for him, with Raven losing his title after The Sandman pinned Richards. Upon his return, Raven blamed Richards for the loss. At Holiday Hell on December 7, 1996, Raven defeated The Sandman in a barbed wire match to regain the ECW World Heavyweight Championship. Despite this, the tension between Raven and Richards continued to build until, on December 28, 1996, Richards turned on Raven by superkicking him during a match with The Sandman. Richards, The Blue Meanie and Super Nova subsequently broke away from Raven.

At the Crossing the Line Again event on February 1, 1997, Raven successfully defended the ECW World Heavyweight Championship against "Dr. Death" Steve Williams – inflicting Williams' first loss in the United States in a decade – after interference from Richards backfired. As part of an agreement between ECW and the World Wrestling Federation, Raven and several other ECW wrestlers appeared on the February 24, 1997 episode of Raw Is War, with Raven confronting Richards.

Over the following months, Raven successfully defended the ECW World Heavyweight Championship against opponents including Dreamer, Richards, Rob Van Dam and Super Nova. His reign lasted until April 13, 1997, when he was defeated by Terry Funk in the main event of Barely Legal, ECW's first pay-per-view.

On the May 1, 1997 episode of ECW Hardcore TV, a controversial angle took place in which a morose Raven, despondent at the loss of his title and other setbacks, confronted Richards, telling him he had one final "mission" for him. Raven then attacked Richards before begging him to "end my pain". At The Buffalo Invasion on May 11, 1997, Raven and Richards reformed their tag team to face Dreamer and Funk, with Richards pinning Funk despite bickering with Raven throughout the match. In the main event, Raven, Richards, Funk and The Sandman faced one another in a four-way elimination match for Funk's ECW World Heavyweight Championship. During the match, Raven DDT'ed both Funk and The Sandman and then demanded that Richards pin them and then lay down for him. Richards refused, instead superkicking Raven and enabling Funk and The Sandman to pin him.

At Wrestlepalooza on June 6, 1997, Raven faced Dreamer in a "Loser Leaves ECW" match. During the bout, Raven abandoned his new valet, Chastity, and unsuccessfully begged Beulah to take him back. Dreamer ultimately won the match by pinning Raven for the first time, marking the end of their lengthy feud and the end of Raven's ECW career. Raven subsequently left ECW and rejoined World Championship Wrestling.

=== Return to WCW (1997–1999) ===
==== The Flock (1997–1998) ====
On June 30, 1997, Levy made his return to WCW as Raven. He was seen sitting in the front row at Monday Nitro where the commentators acknowledged him as "a man who has been a champion with other organizations". On August 21, 1997, at Clash of the Champions XXXV, Raven defeated Stevie Richards in an "unsanctioned" match and then took a seat in the front row. The storyline continued that Raven would frequently appear in the front row for the next few months with his lackeys, slowly forming what would be known as The Flock. Raven was an "unsigned free agent", but eventually accepted a contract with WCW Commissioner J. J. Dillon which stipulated that he could wrestle only when he wanted and under his own rules. The Flock was a stable of misfits in the same vein as the Raven's Nest group in ECW. With The Flock, however, Raven was more openly abusive and controlling, which eventually led to dissension and rebellion. The group's matches were held under Raven's Rules, which meant no disqualifications—weapon usage, double teaming, and outside interference were rampant.

Raven made his in-ring Nitro debut on October 27 against Scotty Riggs, after Riggs refused an invitation to join The Flock. Raven won the match, during which he performed a drop toehold on Riggs that drove his face into a steel chair and temporarily blinded him in one eye. The two engaged in a brief feud which resulted in a match at World War 3 in November, where Raven defeated Riggs and inducted him by force into The Flock.

With The Flock's help, Raven won the WCW United States Heavyweight Championship which lasted only a day as Raven defeated Diamond Dallas Page at Spring Stampede and lost the belt the following night to Bill Goldberg on Nitro. He blamed The Flock and Saturn in particular for his loss. This led to a series of matches, culminating in a match at Fall Brawl that if Raven lost, The Flock would be able to disband. Saturn won with the help of Kidman, who also wanted to leave Raven's abuses.

==== The Dead Pool (1998–1999) ====
Without The Flock, Raven began a series of depressing interviews and walked out on several matches. In October at Halloween Havoc, Raven refused to wrestle Chris Jericho for the WCW Television Championship, but eventually was convinced to return to the ring which he lost the match and was not seen until 1999. On his return, a series of vignettes were shown in which a camera crew followed Raven to his supposed childhood home, where he had led a privileged upper class lifestyle. He was also reunited with his former valet Chastity, who WCW claimed was his sister. He teamed with Perry Saturn, winning the WCW Tag Team Championship at 1999 Slamboree, losing the belts to the debuting The Jersey Triad three weeks later.

He later joined with Vampiro and the Insane Clown Posse in a short-lived stable called The Dead Pool. In a backstage meeting in August 1999, which involved every contracted WCW wrestler, Eric Bischoff offered anyone their release right then and there. Levy was the only one to stand up and walk out, as he was dissatisfied with WCW's creative direction. Levy was granted his release and left the company.

=== Return to ECW (1999–2000) ===
As a condition to leaving WCW, Levy was not allowed to directly join the WWF upon leaving the promotion as levied by a no compete clause in his contract. Via a loophole in the contract, Levy rejoined ECW and signed a one-year contract on August 25, 1999. The next night, Raven made a surprise return at the Last Show at the Madhouse, which was televised on ECW's debut on TNN, winning the tag team title from the departing Dudley Boyz along with Tommy Dreamer on August 26, 1999. A reluctant tag team, Raven and Dreamer reigned as ECW World Tag Team Champions for several months. When they lost the belts, they feuded briefly. Raven and Mike Awesome won the tag team title from Tanaka and Dreamer on March 4, 2000, only to lose them a week later to The Impact Players at Living Dangerously. CyberSlam 2000 was Raven's last ECW appearance with Francine, as she aligned with Justin Credible that evening. In his last televised match (July 15, 2000) Raven challenged ECW TV champion Rhino. His in-ring appearances were initially limited by a recent surgery to repair a rotator cuff tear. Shortly thereafter, he departed for the WWF.

=== Return to WWF/E (2000–2003) ===
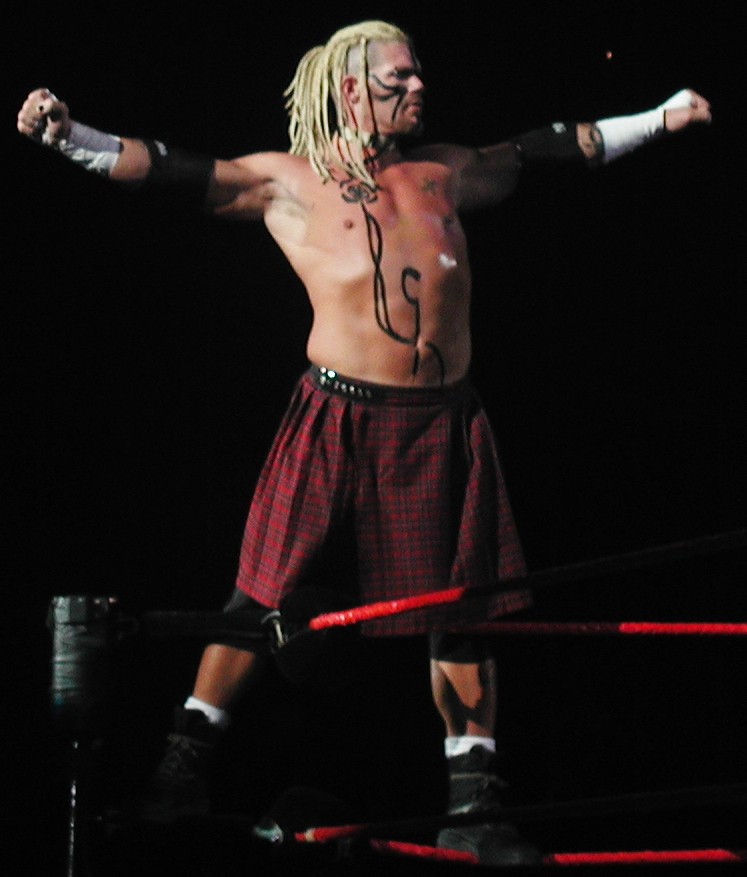
Raven in September 2002

Levy returned to the WWF, as Raven, at Unforgiven on September 24, 2000, when he interfered in the strap match between Tazz and Jerry Lawler by hitting Lawler with a DDT. His previous run in the WWF as Johnny Polo was ignored by the company. He then started teaming with Tazz before they went their separate ways. Raven feuded with Jerry Lawler that fall until January 2001. He then moved on to the Hardcore division, where he would often bring out a shopping cart full of trash cans and other potential weapons during his entrances. On December 22 in Chattanooga, he defeated Steve Blackman for the Hardcore Championship, his first of a record 39 title reigns, though most of Raven's title reigns were short-lived. The Hardcore title at the time was contested under the "24/7" defense rule, leading to segments where one wrestler would win the title only to immediately lose it to another wrestler. At WrestleMania X-Seven on April 1, 2001, he competed in his only WrestleMania match, losing the Hardcore Championship to Kane in a triple threat match that also included Big Show. At Backlash on April 29, he lost to Hardcore Champion Rhyno in a hardcore match. A brief angle had an anonymous Black Ninja, who was later revealed to be his old valet from his Pacific Northwest days, Tori, aiding Raven in retaining the Hardcore Championship.

When the Invasion storyline began, he found himself in the new WCW/ECW Alliance. His most notable storyline during this time was when he was managed by Terri Runnels and destroyed the love interest of Saturn, his mop called "Moppy". He also started teaming with Justin Credible in late July. By the end of the year, Raven was not seen on WWF programs, as the Alliance lost the "Winner Take All" match at Survivor Series on November 18.

In March 2002, when the WWF brand extension was announced, Raven was drafted to Raw. On the final SmackDown! before the split began, he defeated Maven to once again win the Hardcore Championship, thus bringing the title to Raw. He lost the title that Monday to Bubba Ray Dudley. At that time, Levy decided to spend some time announcing, and Raven became the new color commentator for Sunday Night Heat and Excess. This role lasted a couple of months, as he later quit the show to resume his wrestling career on Raw. This did not last long either, as he was "banished" from Raw after losing a match to former ECW alumni Tommy Dreamer on the June 24 episode of Raw. Raven was forced to spend the rest of the year on Heat. Although he won his way back onto the Raw roster, he lost to Jeff Hardy in a Royal Rumble qualifier match, which was his final match in the WWE. He was released from the promotion the following week on January 20, 2003.

=== NWA Total Nonstop Action / Total Nonstop Action Wrestling (2003–2010) ===
==== The Gathering (2003–2004) ====
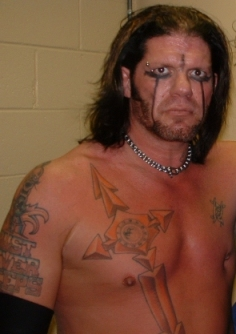
Raven in December 2004

Raven debuted for NWA Total Nonstop Action (TNA) on January 22, 2003, two days after his release from WWE, attacking and hitting his finisher on Jeff Jarrett and stealing the NWA World Heavyweight Championship from him. Raven then embarked upon a long-running storyline in which he claimed it was his "destiny" to win the NWA World Heavyweight Title. Raven began playing mind games with the roster, starting with his former nemesis Sandman, and debuted his trademark Clockwork Orange House of Fun match, which Levy devised himself. On April 30, 2003, Raven got his first shot at Jarrett's NWA World Heavyweight Championship, yet Jarrett won the match.

On September 17, 2003, Raven lost his trademark long hair after he was defeated by Shane Douglas in a hair versus hair match, thanks to the surprise interference of Vampiro. Vampiro and Raven would grow to be bitter rivals which resulted in a backstage brawl which Vampiro ended up with a torn "ACL." While in TNA, he formed a stable known as The Gathering, which included ROH rival CM Punk, as well as Julio Dinero and Alexis Laree, though they would later turn on him. He created matches involving old friends and brought in former colleagues from ECW such as New Jack, Perry Saturn, Mikey Whipwreck, and Justin Credible, all of whom Raven beat in matches. Later in the year these superstars overturned Sports Entertainment Xtreme (SEX). In 2003, Raven feuded with James Mitchell and the Disciples of the New Church. Raven took them all out one by one just like he said, but with interferences from The Gathering and ECW counterparts. Raven ended his feud with James Mitchell in a Last Man Standing match, which was won by Raven. This led to a long undefeated run and the beginning of Raven's attempts to fulfill his destiny. In 2004, Raven teamed up with The Sandman to go against The Gathering. The Gathering won due to interference from James Mitchell, who had aligned himself with The Gathering. Raven then teamed with Terry Funk to defeat the Gathering, even though James Mitchell tried to interfere.

Also in 2004, Raven's old friend Sabu returned to TNA. Raven teamed with Sabu to defeat The Gathering one last time. Raven and Sabu then feuded with Abyss and "The Alpha Male" Monty Brown. Abyss and Brown outnumbered Sabu on many occasions, when Raven failed to watch Sabu's back. Raven waged a campaign against Sabu, disrespecting the memory of his uncle and assaulting Sabu's mouthpiece, Sonjay Dutt, until Sabu finally broke and attacked him on July 23. Raven defeated Sabu in a No Holds Barred match on August 4, and a scheduled return match on August 18 was canceled after Sabu suffered a legitimate back injury. He also competed in the very first Monster's Ball match, with Abyss and Brown.

==== NWA World Heavyweight Champion (2005–2006) ====
On June 19, 2005, Raven turned face and fulfilled his self-proclaimed destiny when he won the NWA World Heavyweight Championship at Slammiversary (by taking Jeff Jarrett's place after Jarrett attacked a fan from the crowd earlier that night and got arrested), defeating A.J. Styles, Abyss, Sean Waltman and Monty Brown in a five way King of the Mountain match. He successfully defended the title in two defenses over the following months against Abyss at No Surrender, and Rhino two months later at Unbreakable. Against Rhino he showed his full array of moves and peeled back the years looking like the Raven in ECW and early WCW. He not only defeated Rhino but hit a Raven Effect DDT on Jeff Jarrett, with the assistance of Jeff Hardy running to the ringside. He also had a tag team match with Sabu against Jeff Jarrett and Rhino.

On September 15, Raven lost the NWA World Heavyweight Championship to Jeff Jarrett in Oldcastle, Ontario, Canada, at a special event of Border City Wrestling. America's Most Wanted ("Wildcat" Chris Harris and "Cowboy" James Storm) came out and interfered on Jarrett's behalf. BCW officials immediately contacted TNA Director of Authority Larry Zbyszko, who declared the title change official (TNA had briefly gone dark on its national television timeslot prior to jumping to Spike TV, prompting a title change in another NWA based promotion). This led to Raven feuding with Larry Zbyszko, who brought in wrestlers like PJ Polaco and Chris K to wrestle Raven. This culminated in a match at Final Resolution where Raven wrestled Sean Waltman with the stipulation that if Raven lost he would have to leave TNA. Raven lost the match and went on hiatus as a result.

Raven returned to TNA on April 23, 2006, at the Lockdown pay-per-view, and reignited his feud with Zbyszko. They would end their feud at Victory Road in a Hair vs. Hair match which Raven won.

==== Serotonin (2006–2008) ====
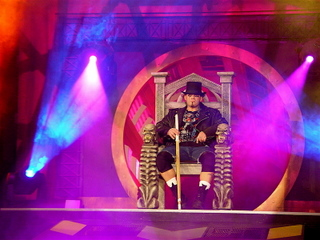
Raven in August 2007

He next feuded with Abyss and Brother Runt, losing to the former in a Hangman's Horror match on Impact after the latter turned on him. Subsequent to this, his coverage in major televised angles has dropped considerably. While he was off-air, an alliance was teased between Kazarian, Johnny Devine, and Matt Bentley. On the TNA Primetime Special before Genesis, the three came out in goth, addressing a new movement in TNA. After a loss at Genesis, sporting a new look (often with a mask), Raven revealed himself as their leader, caning the loser of the match. This stable became known as Serotonin. The direction of this stable was very hard to place, although they lost the majority of their televised matches. Regardless of the outcome, Raven would hit the Serotonin competitor with a cane. After a long hiatus, Raven returned to the ring, losing to Christopher Daniels in a First Blood Invitational then losing to Chris Harris after interference from Kaz. On Impact, Raven came out after Kaz's win over Havok and Martyr and hit Kaz in the back with a Kendo Stick, breaking it over Kaz's back. Raven, Havok, and Martyr then attacked Kaz with kendo sticks. On the July 19 episode of Impact!, Raven and the rest of Serotonin took on the reuniting Triple X. Raven had very little time in the match and Serotonin lost after Skipper hit a diving leg drop, Daniels hit a Best Moonsault Ever, and Senshi hit a Warrior's Way on Havok.

Raven won a House of Fun match, on the August 9 episode of Impact!. He teamed with Robert Roode and James Storm against the team of Chris Harris, Rhino, and Kazarian. Raven lost to Kaz, who had rebelled against him, at Hard Justice despite having the remaining members of Serotonin involve themselves in the match. He then issued a challenge to Abyss and Rhino at Bound for Glory. Abyss later had Black Reign added to the match and made it a Monsters Ball. Raven briefly formed an alliance with Havok, Black Reign, Judas Mesias, and James Mitchell with the purpose of defeating Abyss. At Bound for glory, Raven would go on to lose the match after Abyss gave him a black hole slam on to tacks and glass. On the November 15 episode of Impact, Havok was revealed to be Team 3D's X Division traitor, effectively ending Serotonin. At Turning Point, Raven substituted for Rhino in the "Match of 10,000 Thumbtacks" and teamed with Abyss to defeat Black Reign and Rellik. Raven was officially released from TNA, and his profile was removed from the roster on March 7, 2008.

==== Alliance with Dr. Stevie; EV 2.0 (2009–2010) ====
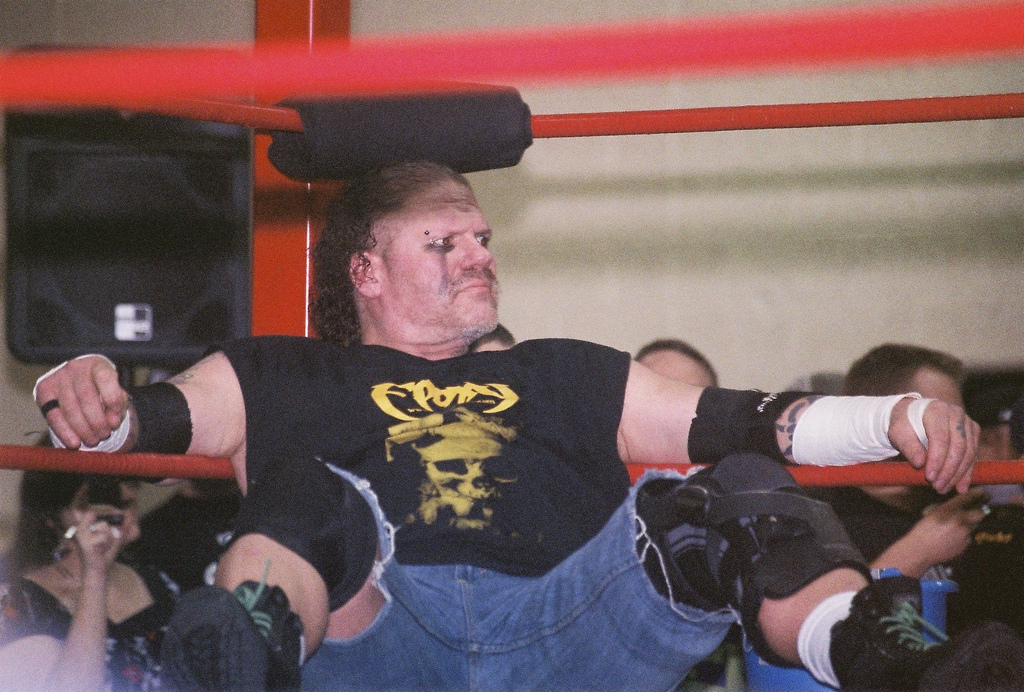
Raven in April 2010

After an absence of more than a year, Raven surprised fans by returning to TNA on May 28, 2009. He returned as a heel by attacking Abyss with a Kendo stick with Dr. Stevie assisting him. He then aligned himself with Dr. Stevie and Daffney. On the June 18 episode of Impact! he won a Clockwork Orange House of Fun match against Jethro Holliday. At Slammiversary, Abyss and Taylor Wilde defeated Raven and Daffney in the first-ever mixed tag team Monster's Ball match. After the pay-per-view, Raven's name was taken down from the TNA website.

On the November 12, 2009, episode of Impact!, Raven returned again to TNA attacking Abyss and throwing a fireball at Mick Foley's face, aligning himself again with Dr. Stevie and Daffney. At Final Resolution, Abyss and Foley defeated Stevie and Raven in a "Foley's Funhouse" tag team match. Raven appeared on the January 4 episode of Impact!, teaming with Dr. Stevie in a number one contender's tag team match, where they were defeated by Matt Morgan and Hernandez. He appeared on the February 18 episode of Impact!, helping Eric Bischoff take out Abyss, along with Rhino, Homicide, Tomko, and Desmond Wolfe.

Raven returned to television four months later on the June 24 episode of Impact! showing signs of a face turn, appearing in the Impact! Zone crowd beside Stevie Richards and Tommy Dreamer. The following week the three were joined by Rhino. On the July 15 episode of Impact! Raven, Dreamer, Richards, Rhino, Brother Devon, Pat Kenney and Al Snow, led by Mick Foley, aligned themselves with the TNA World Heavyweight Champion Rob Van Dam by attacking Abyss and the rest of the TNA locker room. The following week, TNA president Dixie Carter agreed to give the ECW alumni their own reunion pay–per–view event, Hardcore Justice: The Last Stand, as a celebration of hardcore wrestling and a final farewell to the company. On the July 29 episode of Impact! Raven re–ignited his old feud with Dreamer by turning on him, after his match with Abyss, and laying him out with a DDT on a chair and in doing so, turned heel. The following week, Raven explained his turn by saying that he had not forgotten how Dreamer had "stolen", and later married, his girlfriend Beulah McGillicutty, who turned on Raven back in 1996 during his and Dreamer's initial feud. On August 8 at Hardcore Justice Raven defeated Dreamer in a "Final Showdown" match refereed by Mick Foley. On the following episode of Impact!, the ECW alumni, known collectively as Extreme, Version 2.0 (EV 2.0), were assaulted by A.J. Styles, Kazarian, Robert Roode, James Storm, Douglas Williams and Matt Morgan of Ric Flair's Fourtune stable, who thought they didn't deserve to be in TNA, thus once again turning Raven face. At Bound for Glory, Raven, Dreamer, Rhino, Richards and Sabu defeated Fourtune members Styles, Kazarian, Morgan, Roode and Storm in a Lethal Lockdown match. At Turning Point, EV 2.0 faced Fortune in a ten-man tag team match, where each member of EV 2.0 put their TNA careers on the line. In the end, EV 2.0 lost the match and Sabu was released from TNA. Two weeks later on Impact!, Raven was forced to put his TNA future on the line in a match against the TNA World Heavyweight Champion Jeff Hardy. Hardy won the match and as a result Raven was released from TNA. His release from the company was legitimate. Raven worked one last match for the promotion on November 12, 2010, defeating TNA Television Champion A.J. Styles in a non–title match at the Farewell at the Asylum live event.

=== Independent circuit and semi-retirement (2008–present) ===
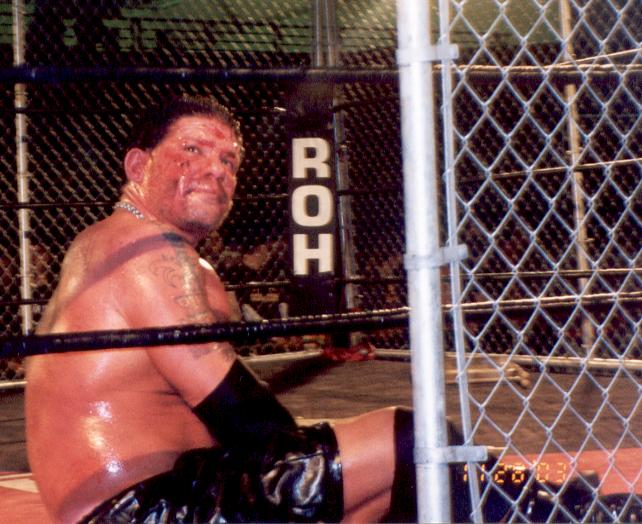
Raven inside a steel cage at a Ring of Honor show

In 2008, Raven appeared in Juggalo Championship Wrestling (JCW) for Season 2 of SlamTV!. In the main event of the second episode, JCW Heavyweight Champion Corporal Robinson put his title on the line against Sexy Slim Goody. When Robinson attempted to hit the Boot Camp, the lights shut off in the arena. When they turned back on, Raven appeared in the ring and hit Robinson with his Evenflow DDT, before stealing the JCW Heavyweight Championship belt. In the third episode, Raven introduced Sexy Slim Goody as his newest lackey. When Robinson ran out to the ring to take his title back, Sexy Slim Goody (kayfabe) knocked him out with a steel chair shot, and Raven began to shave Robinson's afro. Sabu appeared from out of the crowd and scared Raven off, leaving Robinson with a half shaved afro. The tag team of Raven and Sexy Slim Goody had a match against Corporal Robinson and Sabu in the following episode. Raven walked out on the match with the stolen championship belt, fleeing from Sabu. At Bloodymania II, Raven lost to Corporal Robinson in a "Loser leaves JCW" Ladder match. However, Raven returned to the company at Bloodymania III in a losing effort against his old nemesis Sabu in a Raven's Rules match.

Levy was the heavyweight champion of CWA Pro Wrestling, an independent professional wrestling promotion based out of Orangeburg, South Carolina, from March 15 through August 8, 2008. He won the championship when he defeated Timber in Charlotte, North Carolina, on March 15. He was stripped of the title after missing several shows, therefore not being able to defend the championship. Levy was also featured doing shows overseas at Russia's Independent Wrestling Federation, battling Joe Legend. In April 2008, Raven toured Australia and New Zealand including several seminars as well as performing. In June, Raven wrestled for multiple European promotions which included losing to The Vampire Warrior in a flaming tables match for Nu-Wrestling Evolution.

In 2009, Raven regularly wrestled for Collective League of Adrenaline Strength and Honor, NWA Charlotte and Showtime Allstar Wrestling. On August 2, 2009, Raven defeated reigning champion Preston Quinn to win the Vanguard Championship Wrestling World Heavyweight Title in Norfolk, Virginia at the NorVa. Post match, Larry Zbyszko and Raven had a war of words, where Raven challenged Zbyszko to find an opponent to face him for the VCW World Title, a match which he consequently won. In November, he wrestled all across Europe, touring with American Wrestling Rampage.

In January 2010, Raven took on Chris Harris for the PICW Heavyweight Championship and lost. At Bloodymania IV, in the main event Raven took on Corporal Robinson and Mike Knox in a triple threat match for the JCW Heavyweight Championship where Robinson retained his championship.

At JCW Legends and Icons, he was involved in a seven way "Philly Madness" match which included former ECW stars such as Sabu, Shane Douglas and the eventual winner, Rhino. Two days later at Bloodymania V, Raven and Sexy Slim Goody won the JCW Tag Team Championship. On September 16, he defeated Jocephus for the USWO Heavyweight Championship and would lose it in November 11 to Jocephus. At JCW New Year's Eve Ninja Party!, Raven lost the tag team championship back to The Ring Rydas.

On April 28, 2012, Raven debuted for Extreme Rising in a dark match against Gary Wolfe ending in a no contest. On October 27, Raven appeared for Niagara Falls, Ontario-based promotion Busted Knuckle Pro Wrestling's Apocalypse event, defeating Eddie Osborne in a Clockwork Orange House of Fun match. During the match, Raven threw out his shoulder while performing a DDT, but still finished the match, despite being hit with several chair shots and even going through a table after the DDT was performed. After the match, he cut a promo putting over all of the young stars in the promotion as well as Osborne, congratulating the promotion on doing a great job so far in his eyes. On November 11 at Extreme Rising, Raven took on Stevie Richards in a loser leaves town match which ended in a no contest.

In the early part of 2013, Raven toured Europe wrestling for various promotions in various countries including Germany and the Netherlands. On May 24, Raven reunited with Perry Saturn in a tag team Raven's Rules match for Billy Corgan's Resistance Pro Wrestling, defeating Brady Pierce and Mad Man Pondo. Raven had spent 2014 in Nigeria and South Africa. He defeated Fury in a singles match at a house show in Lagos, Nigeria on November 7, 2014. He won the WWP Tag Team Championship with Venus on November 24, which they lost December 22 at house show in Abuja, Nigeria. Raven signed with NWF and made his debut on the main event defeating Strong Bone in a Hardcore match on December 23. He teamed with The Steiner Brothers where they defeated Sabu and The Wolves in a Christmas house show in Lagos. He won the NWF World Heavyweight Championship on December 27, defeating Kamjarlio in steel cage match. He earned his first title defense on December 29, by defeating Sabu on a live event in Cairo. He retained again in six-man battle royal on December 30, in a house show in Newark, New Jersey.

=== Return to Impact Wrestling (2018, 2019, 2020, 2022) ===
On the December 6, 2018, episode of Impact!, Raven appeared as a mental patient helping Eddie Edwards escape Sandy Acres mental hospital giving Edwards a key card to get out of the hospital.

On the January 3, 2019, episode of Impact!, Raven made a surprise appearance helping Tommy Dreamer attack Eli Drake.

On March 31, 2020, during the Total Nonstop Action Wrestling Special!, Raven made an appearance helping Tommy Dreamer during an altercation with oVe afterwards he attacked Dreamer hitting him with a kendo stick following a match between Rhino and Madman Fulton.

On July 1, 2022, at Against All Odds, Raven returned to Impact Wrestling as a special guest commentator for the Clockwork Orange House of Fun match between Moose and Sami Callihan.

On September 23, 2022, at Victory Road, it was announced that Raven would be inducted into the Impact Hall of Fame. On October 7, at Bound for Glory, during the pre-show Raven was inducted into the Hall of Fame by Tommy Dreamer.

=== Major League Wrestling (2023–2024) ===
In the summer of 2022, segments aired showing members of the Major League Wrestling (MLW) roster laid out, each with a calling card on their body. On March 7, 2023, Raven made his appearance known in an MLW video revealing himself as the leader of a heel stable known as The Calling—consisting of Rickey Shane Page and Akira, Delirious, Dr. Cornwallus, and Mandy Leon—who would attack wrestlers during their matches. April 8, 2023, he participated in Battle Riot V as the seventeenth entrant, before eliminating himself by going over the top rope.

== Other media ==
=== Filmography ===
==== Film ====
Year	Title	Role	Notes
1999	The Jesse Ventura Story	Himself	
2008	Death Racers	The Reaper	
2012	Sleeper	Resnik	
2013	Cool as Hell	Himself	
2025	Nevermore: The Raven Effect	Himself	Documentary

==== Television ====
Year	Title	Role	Notes
1996	Swift Justice	Franco	Episode: Sex, Death and Rock 'n' Roll
1998	MTV Ultimate Music Video Feud	Himself	
1999	MTV Beach Brawl	Himself	
1999	Win Ben Stein's Money	Himself	
1999	Donny & Marie	Himself	

=== Comedy ===
In 2010, Levy began working as a stand-up comic, taking part in Bob Levy's Levy World Order comedy tour.

=== Music videos ===
Along with Diamond Dallas Page and members of Raven's Flock, he appeared in a music video for the band Stuck Mojo's song "Rising".

In 2011, Raven starred in the music video "Owata" by the Smashing Pumpkins.

=== Merchandising ===
According to the Wrestling Figure Checklist, there are 18 different Raven action figures from WWE, TNA, WCW and ECW, making him one of few wrestlers to have one from these four major promotions.

=== Podcast ===
Raven currently hosts the podcast "The Raven Effect" with heralded professional wrestling play by play man Rich Bocchini and Joseph Feeney III of The Creative Control Network. Earlier hosts include Busby Berkeley, The Pelican and Johnny Swinger.

== Personal life ==
Levy possesses an IQ of 143 and is a member of Mensa and the Theta Chi fraternity. He was diagnosed with type 2 diabetes, and has also been diagnosed with histrionic and narcissistic personality disorder. From 2007 to 2013 Levy was married to Selina Kyle. Levy stated that they divorced to "save their friendship". Levy and Kyle remained a couple, and in 2025 Levy stated that the two are considering remarrying.

Levy is a lifelong fan of comic books. In Wizard Magazine's May 1999 issue, Levy is quoted as saying

I love the Marvel Knights line. I'm a big Kevin Smith fan, and his work on Daredevil is the best on that book since Frank Miller's stuff. Inhumans is also great. It could be the break-out book of the year because they're finally treating them as real characters instead of just freaks and monsters with no personality.

The article goes on to say that he is a big fan of Watchmen, Swamp Thing, and especially Sandman and that he has a tattoo of Neil Gaiman's Sandman character (Dream) on his back. Levy, along with Brian Azzarello, wrote Issue #14 of Spider-Man's Tangled Web, entitled "The Last Shoot". The comic was based around the professional wrestler (named Crusher Hogan) who Peter Parker defeated in the character's first appearance in Amazing Fantasy. He also provided a cover quote for a trade paperback edition of 100 Bullets.

Levy, along with former colleague Chris Kanyon and colleague Mike Sanders, attempted to sue World Wrestling Entertainment (WWE) for "cheating them out of health care and other benefits", but a federal judge in Stamford, Connecticut dismissed the case. In a 2010 interview Levy explained that the case was dismissed due to statute of limitations running out.

== Championships and accomplishments ==
- Australasian Wrestling Federation
  - AWF Australasian Championship (1 time)
- Extreme Championship Wrestling
  - ECW World Heavyweight Championship (2 times)
  - ECW World Tag Team Championship (4 times) – with Stevie Richards (2 times), Tommy Dreamer (1 time) and Mike Awesome (1 time)
- Extreme Wrestling Federation
  - EWF Championship (1 time)
- Great Championship Wrestling
  - GCW Heavyweight Championship (1 time)
- Heartland Wrestling Association
  - HWA Tag Team Championship (1 time) – with Hugh Morrus
- Juggalo Championship Wrestling
  - JCW Tag Team Championship (1 time) – with Sexy Slim Goody
- Mid-Eastern Wrestling Federation
  - MEWF Mid-Atlantic Heavyweight Championship (1 time)
- National Wrestling Alliance
  - NWA Central States Heavyweight Championship (1 time)
- National Wrestling Federation
  - NWF Heavyweight Championship (1 time)
- NWA Total Nonstop Action / Total Nonstop Action Wrestling / Impact Wrestling
  - NWA World Heavyweight Championship (1 time)
  - King of the Mountain (2005)
  - TNA Gauntlet for the Gold (2003 – Heavyweight)
  - TNA Hall of Fame (2022)
- Pacific Northwest Wrestling
  - NWA Pacific Northwest Heavyweight Championship (3 times)
  - NWA Pacific Northwest Tag Team Championship (3 times) – with Top Gun (1), The Grappler (1), and Steve Doll (1)
  - NWA Pacific Northwest Television Championship (1 time)
- Pro-Pain Pro Wrestling
  - 3PW World Heavyweight Championship (1 time)
- Pro Wrestling Illustrated
  - Ranked No. 22 of the top 500 singles wrestlers in the PWI 500 in 2003
  - Ranked No. 168 of the top 500 singles wrestlers in the "PWI Years" in 2003
- Ring Around The Northwest Newsletter
  - Wrestler of the Year (1989–1990)
- United States Xtreme Wrestling
  - UXW Heavyweight Championship (4 times)
- United States Wrestling Association
  - USWA World Tag Team Championship (1 time) – with Brian Christopher
- United States Wrestling Organization
  - USWO Heavyweight Championship (1 time)
- USA Pro Wrestling
  - USA Pro Heavyweight Championship (5 times)
- Vanguard Championship Wrestling
  - VCW Heavyweight Championship (1 time)
- World Championship Wrestling
  - WCW Light Heavyweight Championship (1 time)
  - WCW United States Heavyweight Championship (1 time)
  - WCW World Tag Team Championship (1 time) – with Perry Saturn
- World Wrestling Federation / World Wrestling Entertainment
  - WWF/WWE Hardcore Championship (39 times)

=== Luchas de Apuestas record ===
Winner (wager)	Loser (wager)	Location	Event	Date	Notes
Shane Douglas (hair)	Raven (hair)	Nashville, Tennessee	NWA-TNA Weekly PPV #62	September 17, 2003	

== See also ==
- List of Jewish professional wrestlers
