= Steve Doll =

American professional wrestler (1960–2009)

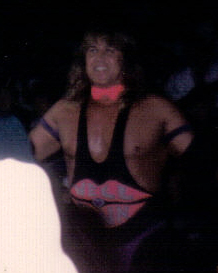
- Doll as Steven Dunn in 1994

Personal information
- Born: Steven Lyle Doll; December 9, 1960 Dallas, Texas, U.S.
- Died: March 22, 2009 (aged 48) Nashville, Tennessee, U.S.

Professional wrestling career
- Ring name(s): Steve Doll; Steven Dunn
- Billed height: 5 ft 10 in (178 cm)
- Billed weight: 240 lb (109 kg)
- Billed from: Portland, Oregon
- Trained by: Rick and John Davidson
- Debut: May 1985
- Retired: 2003

Steven Lyle Doll (December 9, 1960 – March 22, 2009) was an American professional wrestler, best known for his tenure in the World Wrestling Federation (WWF) as Steven Dunn in the tag team Well Dunn.

== Professional wrestling career ==
=== Early career (1985–1993) ===
After training in 1984 with retired wrestlers Rick and John Davidson, Doll debuted in May 1985 for Mid South Wrestling against Dick Slater in Shreveport, Louisiana. He wrestled for Pacific Northwest Wrestling (PNW) from 1987 to 1992, and formed The Southern Rockers with Scott Peterson, a team inspired by the Rock 'n' Roll Express. Doll won a total of three Pacific Northwest Heavyweight titles and eighteen Pacific Northwest Tag Team titles in teams with Peterson, Jimmy Jack Funk, Crush, The Grappler, and Rex King. King would join Doll in the Southern Rockers after Peterson left wrestling. The two would sometimes wrestle as Simply Divine.

=== World Wrestling Federation (1993–1995) ===
Steve Doll joined the World Wrestling Federation in July 1993 alongside his Southern Rocker teammate Rex King, and they became known as Well Dunn (Steven Dunn and Timothy Well), managed by Harvey Wippleman. They were used primarily as an undercard tag team but feuded with many teams, including The Bushwhackers, Smoking Gunns, Men on a Mission and Allied Powers. On January 22, 1995, at the Royal Rumble pay-per-view, Dunn competed in the namesake match, but was eliminated by Aldo Montoya. Doll and King left the WWF in the spring of 1995.

=== World Championship Wrestling (1996) ===
Doll made a handful of appearances for World Championship Wrestling (WCW) on the WCW Saturday Night programme, in early 1996. Most notably on May 27, 1996, Steve Doll wrestled The Mauler to a no contest on WCW Monday Nitro, when Scott Hall interrupted the match and made his return to WCW. This would be the start of the New World Order angle.

=== United States Wrestling Association (1995–1997) ===
Doll went to the United States Wrestling Association as Steven Dunn, defeating Doomsday on September 6, 1997, for the USWA Southern Heavyweight Championship. He was the last wrestler to hold that distinction until the USWA folded in 1997.

=== Later career (1997–2003) ===
Post USWA, Doll formed a tag team with Reno Riggins, known as The Volz. He and Riggins primarily competed in Music City Wrestling, which was syndicated throughout the United States. They would also operate a wrestling school out of Nashville. Doll retired from wrestling in 2003.

== Personal life ==
In 2007, Doll was hospitalized after having a seizure related to an intestinal blockage, and five feet of his intestines were removed during surgery.

On March 22, 2009, Doll died in his sleep at the age of 48. His former tag team partner Reno Riggins attributed his death to heart and kidney failure. However, Doll's family later revealed that he had died of a blood clot from his lung that reached his heart.

== Championships and accomplishments ==
- Music City Wrestling
  - NWA North American Tag Team Championship (4 times) – with Reno Riggins (3 times) and Rex King (1 time)
  - NWA World Tag Team Championship (1 time) – with Reno Riggins
- NWA Main Event
  - NWA North American Tag Team Championship (3 times) – with Reno Riggins
- NWA Southwest
  - NWA Texas Heavyweight Championship (1 time)
- Pacific Northwest Wrestling
  - NWA Pacific Northwest Heavyweight Championship (3 times)
  - NWA Pacific Northwest Tag Team Championship (18 times) – with Scott Peterson (7 times), Rex King (4 times), Scotty the Body (1 time), Jimmy Jack Funk (1 time), Brian Adams (1 time), and The Grappler (4 times)
- Ring Around The Northwest Newsletter
  - Tag Team of the Year (1987–1989) with Scott Peterson
  - Wrestler of the Year (1991)
- United States Wrestling Association
  - USWA Heavyweight Championship (1 time)
  - USWA World Tag Team Championship (8 times) – with Rex King (5 times), Flash Flanagan (2 times), and Paul Diamond (1 time)
- World Wrestling Council
  - WWC World Tag Team Championship (1 time) – with Rex King

New Age Wrestling Alliance Tag Team Championship: with Al Ros

== See also ==
- List of premature professional wrestling deaths
