= Manny Fernandez (wrestler) =

American professional wrestler (born 1954)

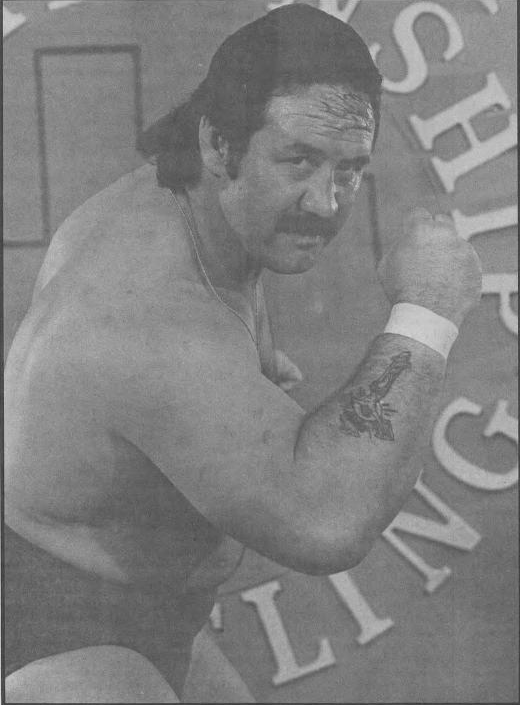
- Fernandez, c. 1985

Personal information
- Born: Emanuel Fernandez; July 27, 1954 (age 72) El Paso, Texas, U.S.
- Education: West Texas State University

Professional wrestling career
- Ring name(s): Manny Fernandez; Manuel Fernandez; Taurus
- Billed height: 6 ft 0 in (183 cm)
- Billed weight: 275 lb (125 kg)
- Trained by: Dick Murdoch
- Debut: 1979

Emanuel Fernandez (born July 27, 1954) is an American professional wrestler, better known by his ring name, "The Raging Bull" Manny Fernandez. He is perhaps best known for his appearances with Jim Crockett Promotions in the mid-1980s, where he was a two-time NWA World Tag Team Champion and one-time NWA Brass Knuckles Champion.

== Early life ==
Fernandez attended West Texas State University, where he played American football for the West Texas State Buffaloes as an offensive guard.

== Professional wrestling career ==
=== Early career (1979) ===
Fernandez was trained to wrestle by Dick Murdoch. He debuted in 1979 in the West Texas-based Western States Sports promotion. In June 1979, he and Brute Bernard entered a tournament for the NWA Western States Tag Team Championship, but were eliminated by Mr. Kiyomoto and Mr. Sato.

=== Championship Wrestling from Florida (1979–1981) ===
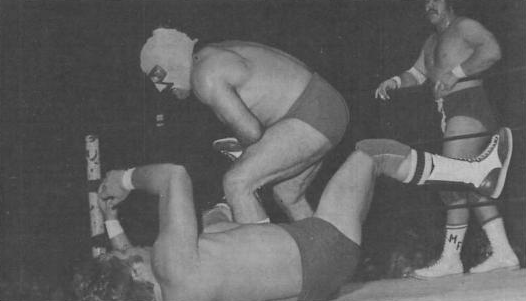
Fernandez (right), c. 1980

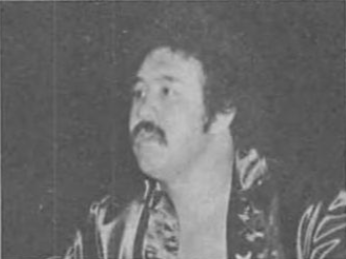
Fernandez, c. 1980

In mid-1979, Fernandez joined the Tampa, Florida-based Championship Wrestling from Florida promotion. In October 1979, he defeated Terry Funk in the Orlando Sports Stadium for the NWA Florida Heavyweight Championship. Over the following months, he successfully defended the title against challengers including Funk, Bugsy McGraw, The Super Destroyer, and Leroy Brown. In November 1979, he faced NWA World Heavyweight Champion Harley Race in a title versus title match; the bout ended in a double disqualification. His reign ended in March 1980 when he lost to Don Muraco in the Miami Beach Convention Center. Fernandez faced Muraco in a series of rematches, but failed to regain the title.

In mid-1980, Fernandez began feuding with Mr. Saito, with the two men facing each other in a series of Mexican deathmatches. Fernandez unsuccessfully challenged Saito for the NWA Florida Television Championship. In July 1980, Fernandez and Steve Keirn entered a tournament for the vacant NWA United States Tag Team Championship (Florida version), but were defeated by Saito and Dick Slater in the first round. In late-1980, Fernandez began feuding with the Cowboy Connection (Bobby Jaggers and R. T. Tyler).

In March 1981, Fernandez became the NWA Florida Television Champion in unclear circumstances. He lost the title to Don Muraco in May 1981. Fernandez left Florida later that month to begin wrestling in Texas.

=== Houston Wrestling / Southwest Championship Wrestling (1981–1982) ===
In May 1981, Fernandez left Florida for Texas, where he began wrestling regularly for the Houston-based Houston Wrestling promotion and the San Antonio-based Southwest Championship Wrestling (SCW) promotion. In July 1981, Fernandez won a tournament for the vacant SCW Southwest Heavyweight Championship; he lost the title to Dick Slater the following month in a Polish street fight in the San Antonio Convention Center Arena. In September 1981, Fernandez unsuccessfully challenged the visiting Nick Bockwinkel for the AWA World Heavyweight Championship. Fernandez won the SCW Southwest Heavyweight Championship back from Slater in October 1981, but lost the title back to him again in December 1981. During his time in Texas, Fernandez also held the SCW Southwest Brass Knuckles Championship and the SCW World Tag Team Championship (the latter with Chavo Guerrero), though the exact dates of his reigns are uncertain. Fernandez left Texas in mid-1982.

=== Central States Wrestling / St. Louis Wrestling Club (1982–1983) ===
In July 1982, Fernandez began wrestling for Bob Geigel's Missouri-based Central States Wrestling promotion and its sister promotion, the St. Louis Wrestling Club. In September 1982, he defeated Roger Kirby for the NWA Central States Heavyweight Championship in the Kansas City Memorial Hall. In October 1982, he unsuccessfully challenged visiting NWA World Heavyweight Champion Ric Flair. After successful title defences against challengers such as Harley Race and Kim Duk, in February 1983 Fernandez lost the NWA Central States Heavyweight Championship to Dewey Robertson. In May 1983, Fernandez teamed with George Wells to compete in a tournament for the NWA Central States Tag Team Championship; they were defeated in the semi-finals by Baron von Raschke and Blackjack Lanza. In June 1983, Fernandez entered a tournament for the vacant NWA Central States Heavyweight Championship, but lost to Ken Patera in the first round. In July 1983, Fernandez entered a tournament for the vacant NWA Missouri Heavyweight Championship, but lost to Bob Orton Jr. in the first round. Fernandez left Texas in August 1983 for a tour of Japan.

=== All Japan Pro Wrestling (1983) ===
In August to September 1983, Fernandez wrestled in Japan for All Japan Pro Wrestling (AJPW) as part of its Super Power Series. During the tour, he primarily teamed with other foreign wrestlers such as Chavo Guerrero and Stan Hansen. In a bout held in Tokyo's Kuramae Kokugikan that aired on Nippon TV, he teamed with Rick Harris in a loss to Genichiro Tenryu and Giant Baba.

=== Southwest Championship Wrestling (1983–1984) ===
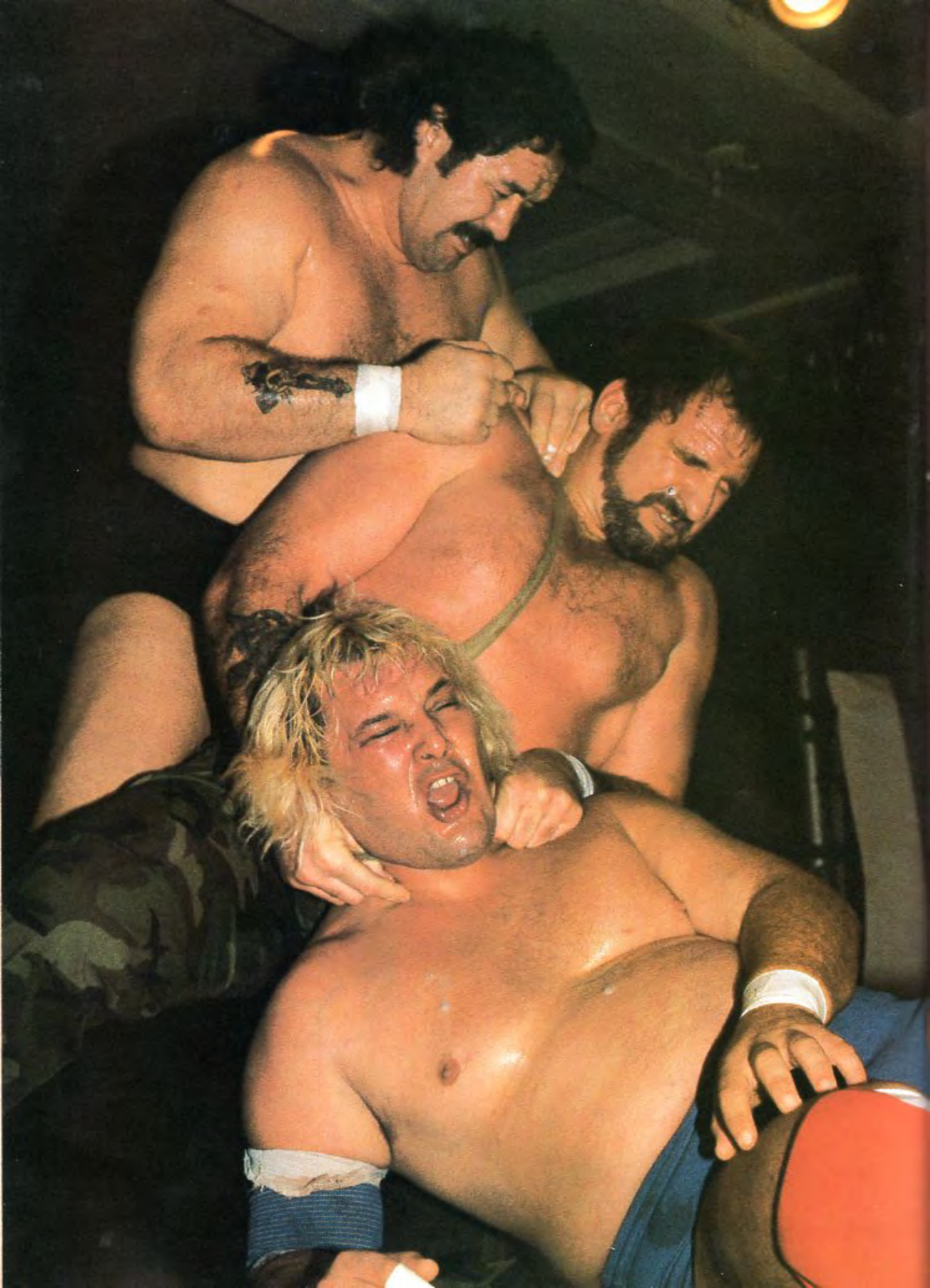
Fernandez (top) and his tag team partner Bobby Jaggers (bottom) wrestling Butch Miller of the Sheepherders (middle), c. 1984

In December 1983, Fernandez returned to the San Antonio, Texas-based Southwest Championship Wrestling promotion, where he formed a tag team with Bobby Jaggers and began feuding with the Sheepherders. In April 1984, Fernandez and Al Perez defeated the Fabulous Blondes (Eric Embry and Ken Timbs) for the SWCW Southwest Tag Team Championship. Fernandez and Perez defended the titles in a series of matches against the Sheepherders, who held the SWCW World Tag Team Championship. In June 1984, Fernandez and Perez were stripped of the titles and they were returned to the Fabulous Blondes. In July 1984, Fernandez began feuding with SWCW Southwest Heavyweight Champion Killer Tim Brooks. The feud culminated in a loser leaves town match in September 1984, which was won by Brooks; this marked Fernandez's final appearance with the promotion before leaving for Jim Crockett Promotions.

=== Jim Crockett Promotions (1984–1987) ===
In September 1984, Fernandez left Texas to join the Carolinas-based Jim Crockett Promotions, where he swiftly formed a tag team with Dusty Rhodes. The following month, he entered a tournament for the vacant NWA United States Heavyweight Championship (Mid Atlantic version), losing to Wahoo McDaniel in the finals. Later that month, he and Rhodes defeated Don Kernodle and Ivan Koloff for the NWA World Tag Team Championship (Mid Atlantic version) in a cage match in the Greensboro Coliseum Complex. At Starrcade '84: The Million Dollar Challenge in the Greensboro Coliseum Complex in November 1984, Fernandez defeated Black Bart for the NWA Brass Knuckles Championship (Mid-Atlantic version). In January 1985, Bart defeated Fernandez to regain the title. In March 1985, the Russians (Ivan Koloff and Nikita Koloff) defeated Fernandez and Rhodes for the NWA World Tag Team Championship (Mid Atlantic version).

In March 1985, Fernandez began a feud with Arn Anderson after being attacked by Anderson and laid out. Fernandez formed a tag team with Thunderbolt Patterson, who had been similarly betrayed by Ole Anderson. In April 1985, he and Patterson lost to the Anderson in a bout in which Patterson and Ole Anderson's halves of the NWA National Tag Team Championship were on the line. He and Patterson went on to repeatedly challenge the Andersons, but failed to win the titles.

In mid-1985, Fernandez began helping Jimmy Valiant in his war against Paul Jones and his "Army", with the duo occasionally teaming as the "B and B Connection" ("Boogie Woogie" and "Bull"). At the inaugural Great American Bash in July 1985, Fernandez teamed with Buzz Tyler and Sam Houston to defeat Paul Jones' Army members Abdullah the Butcher, The Barbarian, and Superstar Billy Graham in a six-man tag team match. At Starrcade '85: The Gathering in November 1985, Fernandez defeated Abdullah the Butcher in a Mexican deathmatch. In 1986, Fernandez formed a tag team with Héctor Guerrero called the "Latin Connection". In April 1986, Fernandez and Valiant entered the Jim Crockett Sr. Memorial Cup Tag Team Tournament, but were eliminated in the second round by the Russians. In September 1986, they entered a tournament for the vacant NWA United States Tag Team Championship (Mid Atlantic version), but were eliminated in the first round by Jimmy Garvin and Tully Blanchard.

In October 1986, Fernandez accepted Jones' money and turned on Valiant, joining Paul Jones' Army and forming a tag team with Paul Jones' Army member Rick Rude. At Starrcade '86: The Skywalkers in November 1986, he came to ringside for Jones' hair vs. hair match against Valiant, and was forced into a cage by multiple babyfaces; after Valiant defeated Jones and shaved his hair, Fernandez and Rude attacked him and gave him a double DDT. Shortly after Starrcade, Fernandez and Rude defeated the Rock 'n' Roll Express in Atlanta, Georgia for the NWA World Tag Team Championship (Mid Atlantic version) in a bout that aired on NWA World Championship Wrestling. This commenced a lengthy feud between Fernandez and Rude and the Rock 'n' Roll Express. In May 1987, Rude left Jim Crockett Promotions while still holding one-half of the titles; this was resolved by transferring the titles to the Rock 'n' Roll Express, who were said to have defeated Fernandez and Ivan Koloff (substituting for Rude) in Spokane, Washington. Fernandez teamed with Koloff until himself leaving Jim Crockett Promotions in September 1987.

=== New Japan Pro-Wrestling (1987) ===
Shortly after leaving Jim Crockett Promotions, Fernandez debuted in New Japan Pro-Wrestling (NJPW) in October 1987 as part of its Toukon Series. During the tour, he faced wrestlers such as Kengo Kimura, Riki Choshu, and Keiji Muto.

=== Continental Wrestling Association (1987–1988) ===
In November 1987, Fernandez joined the Memphis, Tennessee-based Continental Wrestling Association (CWA); in his debut, he defeated Bill Dundee in the Mid-South Coliseum to win the AWA International Heavyweight Championship. The following month, he lost the title to Jerry Lawler, the AWA Southern Heavyweight Champion and NWA Mid-America Heavyweight Champion, in a unification match. In February 1988, Fernandez teamed with Jeff Jarrett in a tournament for the vacant CWA Tag Team Championship, losing to Gary Young and Max Pain in the finals. Fernandez left the CWA later that month.

=== New Japan Pro-Wrestling (1988) ===
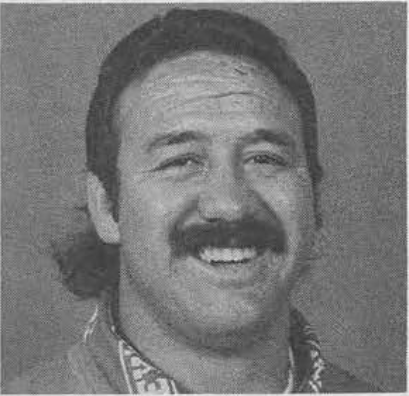
Fernandez, c. 1988

In April to May 1988, Fernandez wrestled for NJPW as part of its Super Fight Series. In July to August 1988, he wrestled for NJPW as part of its Summer Fight Series. In November to December 1988, he returned for a third time that year as part of NJPW's Japan Cup Series; teaming with Buzz Sawyer and Kendo Nagasaki, he competed in the Japan Cup Elimination Tag League.

=== American Wrestling Association (1988–1989) ===
In June 1988, Fernandez began wrestling for the Minneapolis, Minnesota-based American Wrestling Association (AWA). He swiftly began a feud with Wahoo McDaniel after he attacked McDaniel and destroyed his war bonnet. The feud included an Indian strap match at the SuperClash III pay-per-view in December 1988 and a series of cage matches. Fernandez left the AWA in March 1989.

=== New Japan Pro-Wrestling (1989) ===
In July to August 1989, Fernandez returned to NJPW for its Fighting Satellite 1989 Japan vs USA vs Soviet Union Battle Series. He went on to appear with NJPW in November and December 1989 as part of the World Cup League; he finished third in block B with four points. On December 31, 1989, Fernandez made his final appearance with NJPW at the Martial Arts Festival in the Central Lenin Stadium in Moscow, Russia, losing to Salman Hashimikov.

=== Late career (1988–present) ===
In 1989, Fernandez headed to Puerto Rico's World Wrestling Council (WWC). Fernandez sparked controversy in the WWC in 1989 when he wrestled Invader #3 (Johnny Rivera). During the match, Fernandez landed a knee drop off the top rope to Invader #3's midsection; the impact apparently ruptured Invader #3's stomach cavity, causing him to vomit blood all over the ring while Fernandez landed two more knee drops. There have been debates on whether Invader #3's injury was a work, with some theorizing that the incident came about due to real life bad blood between Fernandez and Jose Gonzalez, the booker of WWC who was acquitted of murdering Bruiser Brody earlier that year. Others say the blood was a combination of pig's blood and vodka. In an interview with Bill Apter, Fernandez claimed that it was not a work and deliberately injured Johnny Rivera as a way to avenge the death of Bruiser Brody, though his match with Rivera took place nearly two months prior to Brody's death in July of the same year. Fernandez left the WWC in 1991.

From July to October 1992, Fernandez wrestled for the Global Wrestling Federation in Dallas, Texas.

In October to December 1992, Fernandez wrestled in Japan for Network of Wrestling (NOW) as part of its "Network of Kanto" and "V-Spirits" tours. He returned to NOW in February 1993 as part of its "Fire Endless Battle" tour, and for a fourth and final time in May 1993 as part of its "Battle Hunter" tour.

From 1993 to 1994, Fernandez worked for International World Class Championship Wrestling.

Manny won the APW Universal Heavyweight Championship defeating Robert Thompson on March 8, 1997. He would vacate the title when he left APW on June 8. He would feud with Rick Link in 1998. He defeated Link for NDW Heavyweight Championship on December 2, 1998, until dropping the title back to Link ten days later. He lost to Jimmy Snuka at NDW in Charleston, West Virginia on August 14, 1999.

He defeated Nikolai Volkoff at NWA New Jersey on May 20, 2000.

On December 5, 2002, he lost to Mexican legend Mil Máscaras at LWE Explosion in Fort Worth, Texas.

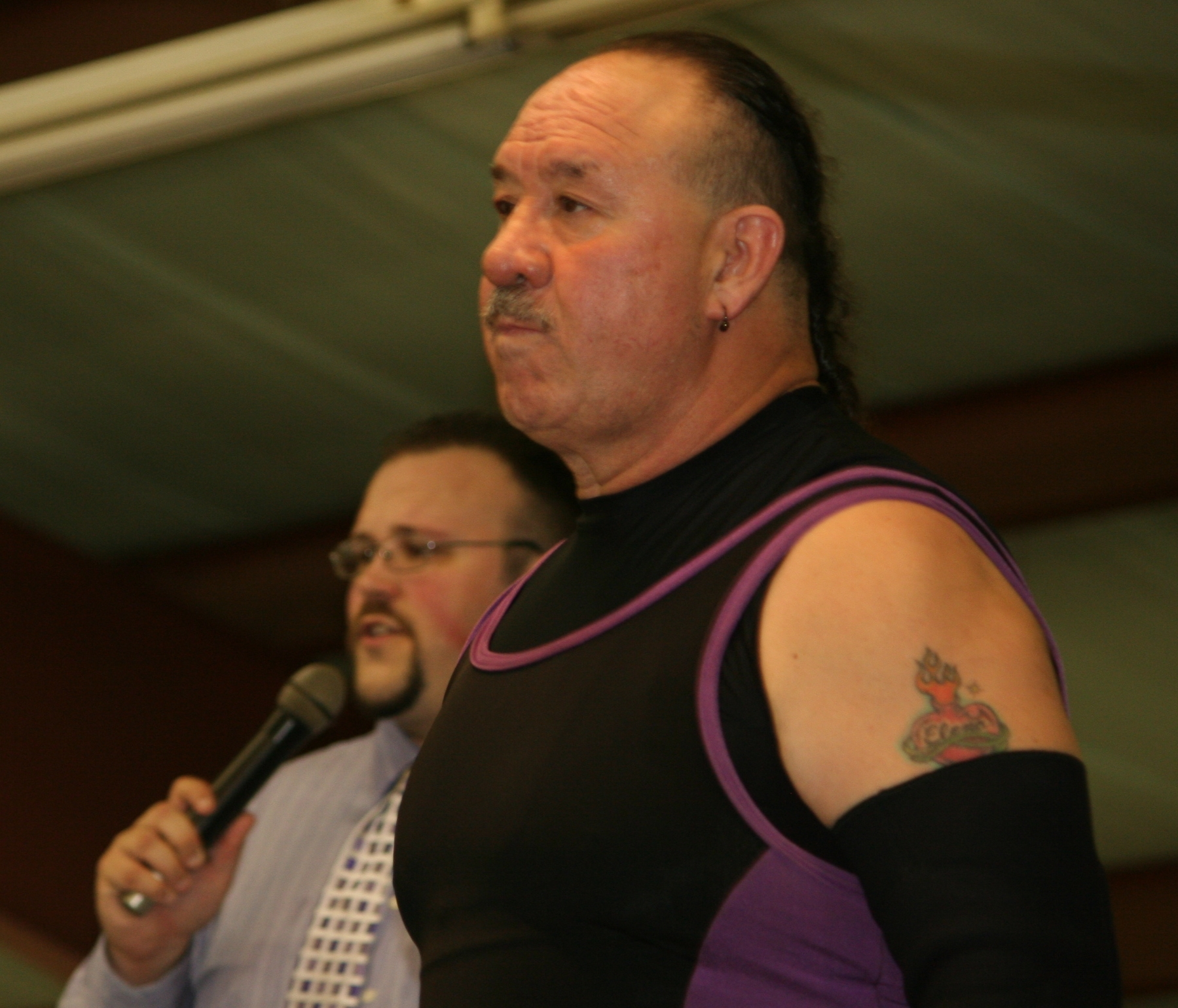
Fernandez in September 2013

On February 25, 2011, he teamed up with George South to compete in The Anderson Brothers Classic 5 Tournament where they George South Jr. and Louis Moore; Deon Johnson and Black Angel; and lost in the finals to The Rock 'n' Roll Express.

Then he teamed with Jimmy Valiant to defeat George South and The Masked Superstar at WrestleCade 2012 on November 11, 2012. On November 30, 2013, he wrestled at WrestleCade 2013 teaming with George South in a Tag Team battle royal won by Caprice Coleman and Cedric Alexander. Afterwards he retired from wrestling.

In 2017 he came out of retirement, where he continues to wrestle in the indies. Since 2018 he's been working with IWA Mid-South. He lost to Michael Elgin on February 15, 2018.

He defeated Pablo Marquez in a bull rope match at UXW on February 23, 2019, in Orlando, Florida. Then on May 30, 2019, he lost to Kongo Kong at IWA Mid-South.

On March 12, 2021, Fernandez launched a self-biographical podcast entitled "No BS With the Bull".

== Professional wrestling style and persona ==
Fernandez was nicknamed the "Raging Bull". His signature move was the "Flying Burrito", a flying forearm.

== Championships and accomplishments ==
- All Pro Wrestling
  - APW Universal Heavyweight Championship (1 time)
- Central States Wrestling
  - NWA Central States Heavyweight Championship (1 time)
- Championship Wrestling from Florida
  - NWA Florida Heavyweight Championship (1 time)
  - NWA Florida Television Championship (1 time)
- Continental Wrestling Association
  - CWA International Heavyweight Championship (1 time)
- Eastern States Wrestling / Eastern Shores Wrestling
  - ESW Heavyweight Championship (1 time)
- International Wrestling Association
  - IWA Heavyweight Championship (1 time)
- Jim Crockett Promotions
  - NWA Brass Knuckles Championship (Mid-Atlantic version) (1 time)
  - NWA World Tag Team Championship (Mid-Atlantic version) (2 times) - with Dusty Rhodes (1 time) and Rick Rude (1 time)
- Lucha Xtreme
  - LX United States Champion (1 time)
- Pro Wrestling Illustrated
  - PWI ranked him # 188 of the 500 best singles wrestlers during the "PWI Years" in 2003.
  - PWI ranked him # 88 of the 100 best tag teams during the "PWI Years" with Dusty Rhodes.
- Southwest Championship Wrestling
  - SCW Southwest Brass Knuckles Championship (1 time)
  - SCW Southwest Heavyweight Championship (1 time)
  - SCW Southwest Tag Team Championship (2 times) - with Chavo Guerrero (1 time) and Al Perez (1 time)
  - SCW World Tag Team Championship (1 time) - with Chavo Guerrero
- World Wrestling Council
  - WWC North American Heavyweight Championship (1 time)
  - WWC Puerto Rico Heavyweight Championship (1 time)
