= Scott Casey =

American retired professional wrestler

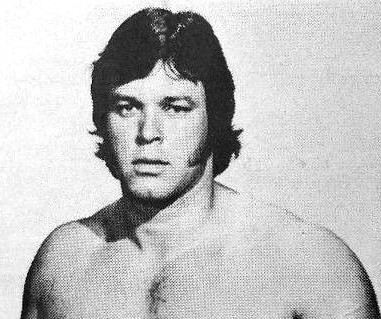
- Casey, c. 1975

Personal information
- Born: January 11, 1954 (age 72) Amarillo, Texas, U.S.

Professional wrestling career
- Ring name: Scott Casey
- Billed height: 6 ft 0 in (183 cm)
- Billed weight: 253 lb (115 kg)
- Billed from: Dallas, Texas; Bulverde, Texas
- Trained by: Terry Funk; Dory Funk Jr.
- Debut: 1970
- Retired: 1993

Scott Casey (born January 11, 1954) is an American retired professional wrestler, best known for his stint in the Southwest Championship Wrestling between 1978 and 1984.

== Professional wrestling career ==
=== Southwest Championship Wrestling (1970–1985) ===
Scott Casey began his wrestling career around 1970 and in his early career spent nine years in Joe Blanchard's Southwest Championship Wrestling (SWCW) promotion. On August 30, 1983, he defeated Adrian Adonis to win the SWCW World Heavyweight Championship. A month later, on September 11 he defeated Tully Blanchard to win the SWCW Southwest Heavyweight Championship. In September, he also held the SWCW Southwest Tag Team Championship with Buddy Mareno, replacing the 'injured' Bobby Jaggers.

=== World Class Championship Wrestling (1985–1987) ===
Casey next went to World Class Championship Wrestling (WCCW), where he was managed by Sunshine. They introduced The Great Kabuki in a feud with Jim Cornette and Midnight Express, and later Kabuki after he turned on them. They also worked against John Tatum and Missy Hyatt. He left WCCW in the middle of the program and Sunshine kept it going with other wrestlers involved.

=== World Wrestling Federation (1987–1991) ===
On the June 13, 1987 episode of WWF Superstars, Casey made his debut, teaming with Lanny Poffo in a loss to Demolition. He immediately began wrestling full-time for the World Wrestling Federation and was programmed into a short house show series against heel cowboy wrestler Ron Bass. Casey was slotted as an upper-level opening card jobber, losing that summer to stars like Rick Rude and The Honky Tonk Man, but also defeated other jobbers like Jose Estrada, Iron Mike Sharpe and Steve Lombardi. On WWF television he was used strictly as a jobber, and earned his first televised victory on the September 24 episode of Prime Time Wrestling, teaming with S. D. Jones to defeat The Shadows. His first televised singles win aired on the October 15 episode, a pinfall over Sharpe. The winter and spring of 1988 found Casey continuing as a jobber in the opening cards of WWF house shows, facing Danny Spivey, Terry Gibbs, Steve Lombardi, and a returning The Iron Sheik. He did defeat fellow jobber Barry Horowitz on the March 7, 1988, edition of Prime Time Wrestling, and then Sharpe in the May 2 episode. This status continued throughout most of 1988 as he lost to upper-level competition, but defeated other jobbers like Richard Charland and Pete Doherty on house shows and on television. His most high-profile appearance came at the 1988 Survivor Series (substituting for an injured B. Brian Blair) where he teamed with Jake Roberts, Tito Santana, Ken Patera and Jim Duggan in a losing effort against André the Giant, Rick Rude, Mr. Perfect, Harley Race and Dino Bravo.

Casey's appearances became more sporadic in 1989, and he only wrestled on 11 occasions after appearing in well over five times as many matches the previous year. His final match of the year was against Barry Horowitz on March 24 in Salt Lake City, Utah, after which he departed the company.

Casey made a one match return to the WWF when he appeared on March 26, 1991, at a taping of WWF Superstars. He teamed with Rob Allen against The Orient Express. Casey retired from professional wrestling after this appearance.

=== Wrestling Around the World (1993) ===
Following a two-year absence, Casey returned and appeared in the Wrestling Around the World promotion on September 14, 1993, in Las Vegas, Nevada, facing the Captain of Hussars and High Tech Knights.

=== Retirement ===
Casey, after leaving the World Wrestling Federation, largely retired from active wrestling. He then worked at a car dealership and in construction, and began working as a trainer for Nick Bockwinkel's UWF International wrestling promotion. He is credited as the trainer who broke Booker T into the business. He later worked for many years as a security officer at the Luxor hotel/casino in Las Vegas. In 2006 Casey was honored by the Cauliflower Alley Club and he published his biography One Last Ride in April 2019.

== Championships and accomplishments ==
- Cauliflower Alley Club
  - Other inductee (2006)
- Central States Wrestling
  - NWA Central States Tag Team Championship (1 time) - with Mike George
- NWA Big Time Wrestling / World Class Championship Wrestling
  - NWA Texas Heavyweight Championship (1 time)
  - WCCW Television Championship (1 time)
- Pro Wrestling Illustrated
  - Ranked No. 278 of the top 500 wrestlers in the PWI 500 in 1991
- Southwest Championship Wrestling
  - SCW Southwest Heavyweight Championship (1 time)
  - SCW World Heavyweight Championship (1 time)
- Western States Sports
  - NWA Western States Tag Team Championship (1 time) - with Don Fargo
  - NWA Western States Heavyweight Championship (2 times)
  - NWA Western States Tag Team Championship (1 time) - with Reggie Parks
