= Tiger Conway Jr. =

American professional wrestler

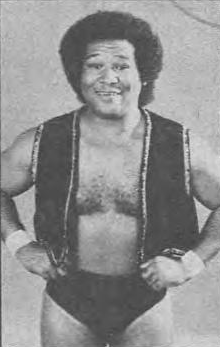
- Conway, c. 1980s

Personal information
- Born: Plasee Dennis Conway Jr. 18 May 1953 (age 73) Houston, Texas, U.S.
- Family: Tiger Conway (father)

Professional wrestling career
- Ring name(s): Tiger Conway; Tiger Conway Jr. Kit Conway; Black Crusader #2
- Billed height: 6 ft 0 in (183 cm)
- Billed weight: 229 lb (104 kg)
- Trained by: Tiger Conway
- Debut: 1971
- Retired: 1996

Plasee Dennis Conway Jr. (May 18, 1953) is a retired American professional wrestler, better known by his ring name, Tiger Conway Jr.. Notable in the Mid-Atlantic and most notably teaming with his father Tiger Conway.

== Early life ==
Born and raised in Houston. Conway grew up playing football in Junior and High school for Kashmere Gardens school. After graduating high school in 1971, Conway refused scholarships from universities and chose to follow his father's foot steps into wrestling.

== Professional wrestling career ==
Conway made his wrestling debut in 1971. He would work in India for a bit during his career. In 1972, he made his debut for Houston Wrestling and won Rookie of the Year from Paul Boesch.

Conway most notable promotion in his career was Mid-Atlantic Wrestling where he worked from 1974 to 1978 and 1987 to 1988. Also worked in Georgia Championship Wrestling, World Class Championship Wrestling, Central States Wrestling and Championship Wrestling from Florida. From 1979 to 1980 Conway with Jose Lothario won the NWA American Tag Team Championship three times feuding with Mr. Hito and Mr. Sakurada over the titles. In 1981, Conway made his debut Southwest Championship Wrestling in Texas where he became two time SCW Southwest Brass Knuckles Champion defeating Tank Patton. Conway and Mr. Wrestling II won the Mid-South Tag Team Championship defeating the Rat Pack (Ted DiBiase and Matt Borne). The titles were dropped to DiBiase and Mr. Olympia.

He formed a tag team with Iceman King Parsons called the Dream Team in 1986 in Texas All-Star Wrestling. The Dream Team won the Texas All-Star USA Tag Team Championship twice feuding with the Golden Brothers. In 1987, Conway returned to the Mid-Atlantic teaming with Pez Whatley as the Jive Tones. They also worked for All Japan Pro Wrestling in 1989. During his career he wrestled in Singapore, Malaysia, Hawaii, Saudi Arabia, and Bahamas.

Conway retired from the sport in 1996.

== Personal life ==
After retiring from wrestling, Conway took over his father's business Tiger Conway Fence Company. He coached his sons football team and wrestling team at his former high school Kashmere Gardens. In 2019, he was inducted into the school's Athlete Hall of Fame.

== Championships and accomplishments ==
- Mid-Atlantic Championship Wrestling
  - NWA Atlantic Coast Tag Team Championship/NWA Mid-Atlantic Tag Team Championship (2 times) - with Paul Jones (wrestler) (1) and Dino Bravo (1)
- NWA Big Time Wrestling
  - NWA Texas Tag Team Championship (2 times) – with Bull Ramos (1), David Von Erich (1) and Kerry Von Erich (1)
  - NWA American Tag Team Championship (3 times) – with Jose Lothario
- Southwest Championship Wrestling
  - SCW Southwest Brass Knuckles Championship (2 times)
  - Texas All-Star USA Tag Team Championship (2 times) – with Iceman King Parsons
- Mid-South Wrestling
  - Mid-South Tag Team Championship (1 time) – with Mr. Wrestling II
