= Houston Wrestling =

Professional wrestling promotion (1925–1987)

- Acronym: GAC
- Founded: 1925
- Defunct: 1987
- Style: Professional wrestling Sports entertainment
- Headquarters: Houston, Texas, U.S.
- Founder: Julius Sigel
- Parent: National Wrestling Alliance

Houston Wrestling, also known as the Gulf Athletic Club, was a professional wrestling promotion that ran from 1925 through 1987. Originally run by the Sigel family, it reached its greatest popularity under Paul Boesch.

== History ==
Houston's wrestling legacy began shortly before World War I, with shows being held at irregular intervals from 1915–1923. Inspired by this, promoter Julius Sigel started Houston's City Auditorium (which has long since been torn down). Following the creation of this historic building, wrestlers began showing up in Houston on a regular basis to perform in weekly Friday night shows.

In 1929, Sigel left to promote shows in New Orleans and Shreveport, Louisiana, leaving the promotion to his brother, Morris Sigel. Morris was not well versed in the wrestling business, but guided the promotion through strong business sense and surrounding himself with people capable of running wrestling shows without his help. During this time, a wrestler from Brooklyn, New York named Paul Boesch was on the wrestling scene, who would ultimately be one of Morris Sigel's main men.

=== Paul Boesch era ===
In 1947, Boesch was in a serious car accident that forced him to retire from performing. Sigel hired him as a backstage aid and radio announcer. As television became popular in Houston around 1949, Boesch became Houston Wrestling's first television commentator. After several years of jumping channels, Houston Wrestling ended up on Houston independent station KHTV (now KIAH), at which point it became a national phenomenon for over 30 years.

Morris Sigel died on December 26, 1966. In early 1967, Boesch bought the Gulf Athletic Club from Sigel's widow, realizing that he was ultimately in the best position to carry on the Houston Wrestling legacy. Boesch noted that he had been training for this position for over two decades without realizing it, and was ready to practice his own ideas and run the company himself. Under his control, Houston Wrestling expanded its legacy, becoming one of the most popular promotions in the nation, rivaling even Dallas' popular World Class Championship Wrestling promotion. Wrestlers such as Billy Red Lyons and Gary Hart (wrestler) acknowledged Houston Wrestling as one of the best in the nation, and also praised Boesch as an honest man and a great promoter who almost always drew sell-outs for his cards.

Boesch spent 21 years promoting in the Houston region out of the Sam Houston Coliseum, and affiliated himself with rival promotions (e.g., American Wrestling Association; Southwest Sports; World Class Championship Wrestling; Southwest Championship Wrestling; Mid-South Wrestling/Universal Wrestling Federation) to bring the best wrestlers and matches to his fanbase.

In the 1980s, amid the rise of cable television and rival territories' war to become the U.S.' sole national promotion, Houston Wrestling slid into decline. As some of its partner-promotions (e.g., Mid-South Wrestling/Universal Wrestling Federation) sold-out to larger rivals like Jim Crockett Promotions, Boesch chose to work with Vince McMahon's even larger World Wrestling Federation (later renamed WWE), instead. After a four-month partnership with the WWF, Boesch ended his career by promoting a retirement show on August 28, 1987. The show had a sell-out crowd of 12,000 fans, and effectively ended the Houston Wrestling promotion/territory. During the show, then-U.S. Vice President George H. W. Bush honored Boesch via telegram. Boesch died two years later.

== Roster ==
Houston Wrestling maintained a very fluid roster due to its reliance on other promotions to provide talent for its shows.

The following wrestlers were at shows working for Houston Wrestling:

- Junkyard Dog
- Kamala the Ugandan Giant
- Jake the Snake Roberts
- King Kong Bundy
- Wahoo McDaniel
- Nick Kozak
- Bull Curry
- Fritz Von Erich
- Hacksaw Duggan
- Dick Murdoch
- Johnny Valentine
- Danny McShain
- Boris Malenko
- Nick Bockwinkel
- Sputnik Monroe
- The Kozak Brothers
- The Midnight Express
- Rock 'n' Roll Express
- J. J. Dillon
- Bruiser Brody
- Gary Hart
- Leo Newman
- Jim Cornette
- Shawn Michaels
- The Blade Runners - Sting & The Ultimate Warrior

Other popular wrestlers who made regular appearances for the promotion included:

- Jose Lothario
- Mil Mascaras
- Ernie Ladd
- Terry Funk
- Dory Funk
- Harley Race
- Red Bastien
- Ivan Putski
- Superstar Billy Graham
- Gino Hernandez
- Andre the Giant
- Bob Backlund
- Bruno Sammartino
- Stan Stasiak
- Terry Taylor
- Barry Darsow
- Tony Atlas
- Bruce Prichard
