= SCW Southwest Heavyweight Championship =

Professional wrestling championship

The SCW Southwest Heavyweight Championship was the top singles title of Southwest Championship Wrestling for most of its existence. It was established as the SCW Southwest Television Championship in 1978 and was renamed in February 1979, and it lasted until the promotion was sold to Texas All-Star Wrestling in 1985, at which point the title was abandoned.

== Title history ==
Silver areas in the history indicate periods of unknown lineage.

Wrestler:	Times:	Date:	Location:	Notes:
SWCW Southwest Television Championship
Tully Blanchard	1	February 1, 1978		Wins tournament to become the first champion.
Al Madril	1	June 1978		Title awarded sometime after May 24, 1978.
Tully Blanchard	2	July 1978	San Antonio, TX	
Mando Guerrero	1	September 6, 1978	San Antonio, TX	
Dale Valentine (Buddy Roberts)	1	September 30, 1978	Corpus Christi, TX	
Tully Blanchard	3	January 10, 1979		
Dale Valentine	2	January 11, 1979		
Tully Blanchard	4	January 12, 1979	Austin, TX	Title renamed Southwest Heavyweight Title in February 1979.
Renamed SWCW Southwest Heavyweight Championship
Dale Valentine	3	April 7, 1979		Sometime after February 3, 1979.
Tully Blanchard	5	July 4, 1979	San Antonio, TX	
Dory Funk Jr.	1	1979		
Wahoo McDaniel	1	October 3, 1979	San Antonio, TX	
Great Goliath	1	November 24, 1979		
Tom Jones	1	December 1, 1979	Austin, TX	
Tully Blanchard	6	December 29, 1979		Still champion as of March 13, 1983.
Wahoo McDaniel	2	May 1980		
Tully Blanchard	7	June 21, 1980	Austin, TX	
Wahoo McDaniel	3	August 23, 1980	San Antonio, TX	
Tully Blanchard	8	November 2, 1980	San Antonio, TX	Wins tournament. Title was vacated sometime after October 3, 1980.
Vacant		March 7, 1981		Title announced as vacant on March 7, 1981, TV show.
Terry Funk	1	March 18, 1981	San Antonio, TX	Wins tournament. Title was either vacated or Funk lost it to Tully Blanchard prior to April 7, 1981.
Wahoo McDaniel	4	April 7, 1981	Del Rio, TX	Defeats Tully Blanchard.
Vacant		1981		Title vacant
Manny Fernandez	1	July 10, 1981	Corpus Christi, TX	Wins tournament.
Dick Slater	1	August 15, 1981	San Antonio, TX	
Manny Fernandez	2	October 6, 1981	Del Rio, TX	
Dick Slater	2	December 27, 1981		
Mongolian Stomper	1	July 1982	San Antonio, TX	Unknown whom Stomper beat for the title.
Dick Slater	3	September 1982	Beaumont, TX	
Vacant		December 1982		Slater leaves SWCW.
Tully Blanchard	9	January 3, 1983	San Antonio, TX	Defeats Bob Sweetan in 14-man tournament final.
Title held up		February 13, 1983	Beaumont, TX	After a match against Bob Sweetan.
Bob Sweetan	1	February 27, 1983	San Antonio, TX	Wins rematch.
Adrian Adonis	1	April 15, 1983	Austin, TX	
Bob Sweetan	2	May 20, 1983	Weslaco, TX	
Tully Blanchard	10	June 13, 1983	San Antonio, TX	
Scott Casey	1	September 11, 1983	San Antonio, TX	
Killer Tim Brooks	1	February 27, 1984	San Antonio, TX	
Bobby Jaggers	1	June 16, 1984	Austin, TX	
Killer Brooks	2	July 1, 1984	San Antonio, TX	
Kevin Sullivan	1	December 9, 1984	San Antonio, TX	
Title retired		April 1985		SWCW is sold to Texas All-Star Wrestling.
