= Adrian Adonis =

American professional wrestler (1953–1988)

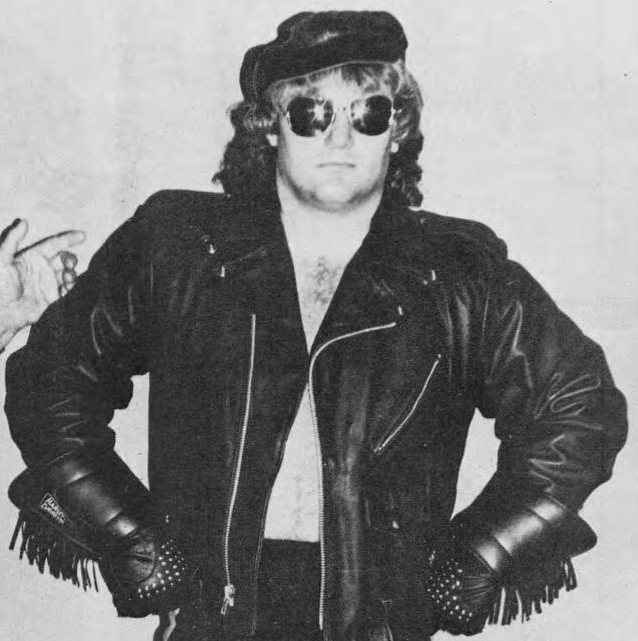
- Adonis, c. 1983

Personal information
- Born: Keith Adonis Franke; September 15, 1953 Buffalo, New York, U.S.
- Died: July 4, 1988 (aged 34) Lewisporte, Newfoundland, Canada
- Cause of death: Traffic collision
- Spouse: Bea Franke Hall (m. 1972)
- Children: 2

Professional wrestling career
- Ring name(s): Adrian Adonis; Keith Franks
- Billed height: 5 ft 11 in (180 cm)
- Billed weight: 298 lb (135 kg)
- Billed from: New York City
- Trained by: Fred Atkins
- Debut: 1974

Keith Adonis Franke (September 15, 1953 – July 4, 1988) was an American professional wrestler, better known by his ring name, "Adorable" Adrian Adonis. He was best known for his appearances with the American Wrestling Association and World Wrestling Federation throughout the 1980s.

Adonis debuted in 1974 under his real name, until he adopted the Adrian Adonis name in the late 1970s. He later began working for the American Wrestling Association (AWA), forming a tag team with Jesse Ventura called the "East-West Connection", winning the AWA World Tag Team Championship. They debuted for the World Wrestling Federation in late 1981, but Ventura stopped wrestling regularly due to injuries. After this, Adonis began teaming with Dick Murdoch as the "North-South Connection", winning the WWF Tag Team Championship.

In 1986, Adonis underwent a gimmick change as an effeminate, flamboyant wrestler who wore pink clothing and garish makeup, adopting the "Adorable" Adrian Adonis name. He would be involved in a feud with Roddy Piper, which culminated in a hair vs. hair match at WrestleMania III. After he was fired in mid-1987, he made a brief return to the AWA and would make appearances in small promotions until his death in a car accident in 1988. His career was a subject of a 2023 episode of Viceland's documentary series, Dark Side of the Ring.

== Early life ==
Franke was born on September 15, 1953, in Buffalo, New York. He was the adopted son of Kenneth and Hortense Franke, and had two sisters, Karen and Susan. He went to Kenmore East High School in the class of 1971. A gifted amateur wrestler, he won a section VI title in 1970. However, he dropped out as he grew bored with school. For a short time, Adonis played football in the Canadian Football League before focusing on a wrestling career.

== Professional wrestling career ==
=== Early career (1974–1979) ===
Franke trained under Fred Atkins and debuted in 1974, wrestling under the name Keith Franks. In the late 1970s, he adopted the ring name "Adrian Adonis" and the character of a brawling, leather jacket-clad biker. In Pacific Northwest Wrestling, Adonis formed a tag team with Roddy Piper. He later split from Piper and became a fan favorite, teaming with Ron Starr to win the NWA Pacific Northwest Tag Team Championship from Piper and Killer Brooks before losing the title to the Kiwi Sheepherders.

=== American Wrestling Association (1979–1982) ===
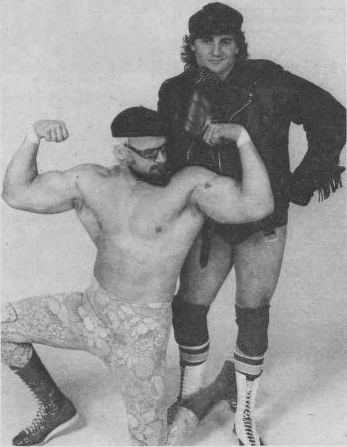
Adonis (right) and Jesse Ventura as the East-West Connection, c. 1982

In the late 1970s, Adonis joined the Minneapolis-based American Wrestling Association. In 1979, he formed a tag team with Jesse Ventura. The team was called the "East-West Connection" because Adonis was from New York (in the Eastern United States), while Ventura was billed from California (in the Western United States). The East-West Connection was awarded the AWA World Tag Team Championship on July 20, 1980, when Verne Gagne (one half of the tag champions with Mad Dog Vachon) was unable to defend it because he was vacationing in Europe. They held the belts until June 14, 1981, when they were defeated by Greg Gagne and Jim Brunzell.

=== World Wrestling Federation (1981–1987) ===
==== East-West Connection (1981–1983) ====
Adonis and Ventura debuted in the World Wrestling Federation (WWF) in October 1981, working both as a team and in singles matches. Adonis was a frequent challenger of WWF Champion Bob Backlund and WWF Intercontinental Champion Pedro Morales throughout the first half of 1982.

==== North-South Connection (1983–1985) ====
When injuries caused Ventura to stop wrestling regularly, Adonis formed a tag team with the Texan Dick Murdoch, called "The North-South Connection". The team debuted in late 1983. Around this time, Adonis (who had previously been a muscular, stocky, and well-conditioned wrestler) gained a considerable amount of weight. On April 17, 1984, The North-South Connection defeated Tony Atlas and Rocky Johnson to win the WWF World Tag Team Championship. They held the title until January 21, 1985, when they were defeated by Barry Windham and Mike Rotunda. The team split shortly after the loss.

==== "Adorable" Adrian Adonis (1985–1987) ====
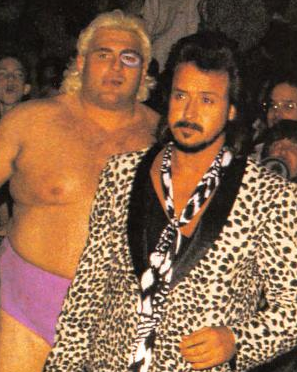
Adonis (left) and his manager Jimmy Hart (right), c. 1987

In late 1985, after being briefly managed by Bobby "The Brain" Heenan and adopting the Sleeper, which he called “Goodnight, Irene”, as a finisher, Adonis's gimmick began to change. First, Jimmy Hart became his manager when Hart traded King Kong Bundy to Heenan in exchange for Adonis and The Missing Link. With Hart in his corner, Adonis defeated Corporal Kirchner to advance in The Wrestling Classic pay-per-view tournament in November, then lost to Dynamite Kid in the quarterfinals. After taking Heenan as his manager in July 1985, Adonis started carrying a briefcase. Eventually, the briefcase had the phrase "Relax with Trudi" on it. In September 1985, Hart would become his manager and he would also eventually carry a spray called Fragrance. During an edition of Piper's Pit which aired in January 1986, Adonis gave his signature leather jacket away to host Roddy Piper (who wore it for years afterward).

Adonis then adopted the gimmick of the effeminate "Adorable" Adrian Adonis, bleaching his hair blond and wearing pink ring attire, as well as scarves, leg warmers, dresses, hats, and clownish amounts of eye shadow and rouge. At this time, his weight further ballooned, peaking at over 350 lb (160 kg; 25 st). He also ceased his prior weightlifting regimen, stopped tanning, and removed all of his body hair. The result made him appear pale, soft, rotund and flabby, despite the fact that he retained considerable athleticism and agility in the ring. He defeated Uncle Elmer in quick fashion at WrestleMania 2 and feuded extensively with the Junkyard Dog and George "The Animal" Steele, while also unsuccessfully challenging Hulk Hogan for the WWF Championship on multiple occasions.

In May 1986, during Piper's five-month hiatus from the WWF, Adonis (with Hart) debuted his own talk segment, The Flower Shop. These segments were the primary backdrop for Paul Orndorff's slow-building heel turn against his friend Hulk Hogan, with Adonis relentlessly needling Orndorff about living in Hogan's shadow. In August, shortly before Piper's return, Adonis obtained the services of Piper's bodyguard, "Cowboy" Bob Orton, who took to wearing a pink cowboy hat. A feud with Piper heated up when Adonis, Orton, and Don Muraco attacked him during a "duel" between the two talk segments, injuring his leg, covering him in lipstick and damaging the Pit set. A week later, Piper destroyed the set of The Flower Shop with a baseball bat. It was never rebuilt. On the October 4 Saturday Night's Main Event VII, Piper struck Adonis with a crutch, resulting in a two-month absence from TV with an alleged separated shoulder. In reality, Adonis was fired but quickly rehired when Piper's house show matches versus Don Muraco and Bob Orton Jr. didn't draw. After Adonis returned in November to attack Piper on the Pit, the two agreed to a hair vs. hair match at WrestleMania III. Piper won the bout with help from Brutus Beefcake, who cut off the majority of Adonis's hair afterward. Adonis then began a feud with Beefcake, but he was fired in May 1987 for what the WWF claimed were "dress code violations".

During Adonis' tenure as the "adorable" one, it was often regarded as having been a poor man's version of Welsh wrestler "Exotic" Adrian Street, with Street admitting that Adonis did many things he did as the "Exotic" one wrong.

=== Return to American Wrestling Association (1987–1988) ===
Franke (now with a shaved head) left the WWF shortly after WrestleMania III and returned to the AWA, where he was managed by Paul E. Dangerously during 1987. He maintained his "Adorable" Adrian Adonis gimmick, feuded with Tommy Rich and lost the final match of the AWA International Television Championship tournament to Greg Gagne in December 1987. While there, he lost one hundred pounds and hoped to return to WWF.

=== New Japan Pro Wrestling (1988) ===
With his ankle fully recovered, Franke wrestled a tour for New Japan throughout May and June 1988. During that tour, he would not use his North American "Adorable" gimmick and teamed up with Owen Hart and D.J. Peterson. On June 23, he and Murdoch unsuccessfully challenged Riki Choshu and Masa Saito for the IWGP Tag Team Championship. On June 26, teaming up with Murdoch against Kengo Kimura and Yoshiaki Fujiwara, which ended in a draw.

== Death ==
With hopes of rejoining WWF and having lost weight, he worked for Dave McKigney in Newfoundland and wrestled against Hartford Love. On July 4, 1988, in Lewisporte, Newfoundland, Franke was in a minivan with fellow wrestlers, and twins William "Mike Kelly" Arko, Victor "Pat Kelly" Arko, and Dave McKigney. Franke, McKigney, and Victor Arko were killed when Victor Arko, allegedly blinded by the setting sun, swerved to avoid hitting a moose causing the van to fall from a bridge into a creek below. Franke suffered severe head injuries and died a few hours later. William Arko was the sole survivor and sustained severe leg injuries.

He was survived by his wife and two daughters. He is buried at Greenlawn Memorial Park in Bakersfield, California.

== Championships and accomplishments ==
- American Wrestling Association
  - AWA World Tag Team Championship (1 time) – with Jesse Ventura
- NWA Hollywood Wrestling
  - NWA Americas Heavyweight Championship (1 time)
  - NWA Americas Tag Team Championship (2 times) – with Black Gordman (1 time) and Roddy Piper (1 time)
- Pacific Northwest Wrestling
  - NWA Pacific Northwest Tag Team Championship (1 time) – with Ron Starr
- Pro Wrestling Illustrated
  - PWI Editor's Award (1988) tied with Bruiser Brody
  - PWI ranked him #128 of the 500 best singles wrestlers of the PWI Years in 2003.
  - PWI ranked him #35 of the 100 best tag teams with Dick Murdoch of the PWI Years in 2003.
- Ring Around The Northwest Newsletter
  - Wrestler of the Year (1979)
- Southwest Championship Wrestling
  - SCW Southwest Heavyweight Championship (1 time)
  - SCW World Heavyweight Championship (1 time)
- World Wrestling Federation
  - WWF World Tag Team Championship (1 time) – with Dick Murdoch
- Wrestling Observer Newsletter
  - Most Embarrassing Wrestler (1986)
  - Most Improved Wrestler (1981)
  - Most Underrated Wrestler (1982)
  - Worst Gimmick (1986, 1987)

== See also ==
- List of premature professional wrestling deaths
