= Southwest Championship Wrestling =

US television program

- Acronym: SWCW
- Founded: 1978
- Defunct: 1985
- Style: American Wrestling
- Headquarters: San Antonio, Texas
- Founder: Joe Blanchard
- Owner: Joe Blanchard

Southwest Championship Wrestling (SCW) was a professional wrestling promotion that was owned by Joe Blanchard and based in San Antonio, Texas, from 1978 to 1985, when it was purchased by Texas All-Star Wrestling and absorbed into that company.

== History ==
=== Venues ===
Its television matches were usually taped at The Junction, a small boxing venue in San Antonio, although occasional matches from cards at San Antonio's HemisFair Arena were also seen.

=== Television ===
Starting on December 5, 1982, Southwest Championship Wrestling became the first weekly wrestling program on the USA Cable Network, airing Sundays at 11:00 a.m. Eastern Time. As a result of the new national exposure, SWCW staged a one-night tournament in Houston, Texas, to determine an "Undisputed World Heavyweight Champion." Adrian Adonis was the winner of this tournament, and as a result he was presented with the oldest existing championship belt by Lou Thesz as well as a brand new belt. The 75-year old belt is now on display at the George Tragos/Lou Thesz Professional Wrestling Hall of Fame in Waterloo, Iowa

However, because of a particularly bloody match between Tully Blanchard and "Bruiser" Bob Sweetan (which USA refused to air), the inability of the promotion to keep paying USA the $7,000 per week to keep the time slot, and a monetary offer made to the cable channel by WWF owner Vince McMahon to replace Southwest Championship Wrestling with his own programming, In addition, Barry Diller, who as head of Paramount Pictures was also at the time the main shareholder in the USA Network, had by August 1983 secured a deal to make the USA Network a source for Madison Square Garden Network programming and wanted to focus more on having the network being tied to sporting organizations which could air events in New York City's Madison Square Garden. USA canceled the program (in spite of the high ratings the show was garnering for the network) and turned the time slot over to WWF All American Wrestling. Adonis' "undisputed championship" simply faded from SCW storylines within a few months and was abandoned in September 1983, and in April 1985, the promotion was sold to Texas All-Star Wrestling.

=== Working alliance ===
Southwest Championship Wrestling had many working alliances with other wrestling promotions such as the American Wrestling Association when its world champion Nick Bockwinkel defended his title at SWC cards. Southwest Championship Wrestling also had talent exchange deals with World Class Championship Wrestling in Dallas and the World Wrestling Council in Puerto Rico.

=== Rights of Footage ===
In 2010, JADAT Sports Inc. bought all the footage of SCW and Texas All Star from Ronnie Martinez. They have released a DVD "Best of the 80s Volume I", which contains mostly SCW footage. The Southwest Championship Wrestling tape library is one of the few classic wrestling tape libraries not owned by World Wrestling Entertainment. in 2021 JADAT Sports Inc. appointed Stream Go Media LLC as the exclusive distribution agents for both SCW and Texas All-Star Wrestling. Footage from both SCW and Texas All-Star Wrestling both appear on the streaming service "Wrestling Legends Network" built and operated by Stream Go Media, LLC launched on May 25, 2021, on the Roku platform and on www.WrestlingLegendsNetwork.tv.

== Championships ==
For most of the promotion's existence, the World Heavyweight Champion of the American Wrestling Association was recognized as SCW's top champion as well.

Title	Final champion(s)
SCW Southwest Brass Knuckles Championship	Tony Atlas (abandoned in 1983)
SCW Southwest Heavyweight Championship	Kevin Sullivan
SCW Southwest Junior Heavyweight Championship	Ron Sexton
SCW Southwest Tag Team Championship	The Maoris (title renamed & continued in Texas All-Star)
SCW World Heavyweight Championship	Scott Casey (abandoned in 1983)
SCW World Tag Team Championship	The Sheepherders (abandoned in 1984)

== Alumni ==
- Chris Adams
- Adrian Adonis
- Austin Idol
- Bobby Fulton
- Buddy Moreno
- Ricky Morton
- Cocoa Samoa
- Gino Hernandez
- Ken Lucas
- Tony Falk
- Tully Blanchard
- Ted DiBiase
- Dory Funk Jr.
- Terry Funk
- "Bruiser" Bob Sweetan
- Scott Casey
- Terry Allen
- Bob Orton Jr.
- Chavo Guerrero Sr.
- Mando Guerrero
- Brett Sawyer
- Buzz Sawyer
- Eric Embry
- Tim Brooks
- Dan Greer
- The Ninja Warrior
- CT Night The Boss
- Ivan Putski
- Tony Atlas
- Skip Young
- Buddy Landel
- Bobby Jaggers
- Kareem Muhammad
- Blackjack Mulligan
- Dick Murdoch
- Iceman Parsons
- Al Perez
- Larry Lane
- Manny Fernandez
- Tom Prichard
- Chicky Starr
- Kelly Kiniski
- Adrian Street
- Bushwhacker Luke
- Bushwhacker Butch
- Jonathan Boyd
- Mil Máscaras
- Rick Rude
- Eddie Mansfield
- Dick Slater
- Nick Bockwinkel
- Jim Duggan
- Wahoo McDaniel
- Abdullah the Butcher
- Kevin Sullivan
- Bruiser Brody
- Jerry Lawler
- Eddie Gilbert
- Tito Santana
- The Original Nighthawk
- The Sheik
- Baron von Raschke
- Ron Sexton
- Snake Brown
- Tank Patton
- Tiger Conway Jr.
- Rudy Boy Gonzalez
- The Grappler
- Tony Anthony
- The Hood
- The Mummy
- Manny Villalobos

=== Commentators ===
- Gene Kelly
- Gene Goodsen
- Steve Stack
- Rapido Rodriguez
