= SCW Southwest Brass Knuckles Championship =

Professional wrestling championship

SWCW Southwest Brass Knuckles Championship

Details
- Promotion: Southwest Championship Wrestling
- Date established: February 1981
- Date retired: 1983
Statistics
- First champion(s): Tank Patton
- Final champion(s): Tony Atlas
- Most reigns: Tank Patton (3 reigns)

The SWCW Southwest Brass Knuckles Championship was a short-lived secondary title in Southwest Championship Wrestling. It lasted from 1981 until about 1983.

== Title history ==
Key
No.	Overall reign number
Reign	Reign number for the specific champion
Days	Number of days held

No.	Champion	Championship change			Reign statistics		Notes	Ref.
No.	Champion	Date	Event	Location	Reign	Days	Notes	Ref.
1	Tank Patton	February 1981	SCW show	Denver Colorado	1	(Note: The date the championship was won is uncertain, which means it lasted between 1 and 27 days.)		
2	Tiger Conway Jr.	February 27, 1981	SCW show	Houston, Texas	1	56		
3	Tank Patton	April 24, 1981	SCW show	Houston, Texas	2	(Note: The date the championship was lost is uncertain, which means it lasted between 1 and 76 days.)		
4	Tiger Conway Jr.	1981	SCW show	Houston, Texas	2	(Note: The date the championship was won is uncertain, which means it lasted between 1 and 76 days.)		
5	Tank Patton	July 10, 1981	SCW show	Houston, Texas	3	49		
6	Bruiser Brody	August 28, 1981	SCW show	Houston, Texas	1	(Note: The date the championship was lost is uncertain, which means it lasted between 1 and 28 days.)		
Championship history is unrecorded from August 28, 1981 to September 25, 1981.
7	Ken Patera	September 25, 1981	SCW show	Houston, Texas	1	9		
8	Manny Fernandez	October 4, 1981	SCW show	Houston, Texas	1	(Note: The date the championship was won is uncertain, which means it lasted between 1 and 84 days.)		
Championship history is unrecorded from October 4, 1981 to December 27, 1981.
9	Bruiser Brody	December 27, 1981	SCW show	Houston, Texas	2	(Note: The date the championship was lost is uncertain, which means it lasted between 166 and 250 days.)	Defeated Gino Hernandez; still champion as of June 11, 1982.	
Championship history is unrecorded from December 27, 1981 to September 3, 1982.
10	Tony Atlas	September 3, 1982	SCW show	Houston, Texas	1	(Note: The length of the reign is too uncertain to calculate.)	Defeated the Mongolian Stomper.	
—	Deactivated	1983	N/A	N/A	—	—	Championship abandone	
