= SCW World Heavyweight Championship =

Professional wrestling championship

Details
- Promotion: Southwest Championship Wrestling
- Date established: May 26, 1983
- Date retired: September 1983
Statistics
- First champion(s): Adrian Adonis
- Final champion(s): Scott Casey

The SCW World Heavyweight Championship briefly served as the top singles title in Southwest Championship Wrestling for a few months in 1983. The title was established in response to SCW landing a television show on the USA Network in late-1982, but after USA controversially canceled Southwest Championship Wrestling a few months later and turned its TV time over to WWF All American Wrestling, the title was forgotten and eventually abandoned.

== Title history ==
Wrestler:	Times:	Date:	Location:	Notes:
Adrian Adonis	1	May 26, 1983	Houston, TX	Defeats Bob Orton Jr. in 8-man tournament final; presented old NWA belt by Lou Thesz
Scott Casey	1	August 30, 1983	St. Louis, MO	Fictitious title change
Title retired		September 1983		Title abandoned
