= Tim Brooks (wrestler) =

American professional wrestler (1946–2020)

- Brooks, c. 1985

Personal information
- Born: Timothy Paul Brooks; December 4, 1946 Waxahachie, Texas, U.S.
- Died: June 30, 2020 (aged 73)
- Children: 4
- Family: Dick Murdoch (cousin)

Professional wrestling career
- Ring name(s): Killer Brooks; Tim Brooks
- Billed height: 6 ft 0 in (183 cm)
- Billed weight: 253 lb (115 kg)
- Billed from: Dallas, Texas
- Trained by: Dick Murdoch; The Sheik
- Debut: 1967
- Retired: 1998
- Military service
- Allegiance: United States
- Branch: United States Army
- Conflicts: Vietnam War

Timothy Paul Brooks (December 4, 1946 – June 30, 2020), better known by his ring name "Killer" Tim Brooks, was an American professional wrestler. He competed in North American regional promotions, including the National Wrestling Alliance (NWA), Pacific Northwest Wrestling (PNW), World Wrestling Council (WWC), World Class Championship Wrestling (WCCW) and Southwest Championship Wrestling (SWCW) during the 1970s and 1980s.

== Military service ==
Brooks served in the United States Army during the Vietnam War.

== Professional wrestling career ==
Brooks got his start in 1967, joining his cousin Dick Murdoch in the Detroit and Toronto territories. He wore a hard hockey player's elbow guard and used it as a weapon. He fought Ben Justice, Tex McKenzie and Tiger Jeet Singh among others.

Into the early 1970s, Brooks also wrestled in the Cleveland based NWF taking on Haystacks Calhoun, Fred Curry and Tony Marino. He worked as a mid-level heel often being managed by Skandor Akbar, Armand Hussein and Gary Hart. Long before the infamous 1988 angle in the WWF between Hulk Hogan, André the Giant and Ted DiBiase over the WWF World Heavyweight Championship, Brooks had, in 1983, sold his NWA National Heavyweight Championship to Larry Zbyszko sometime after winning it from Paul Orndorff. In this case, however, no interference from Zbyszko had happened during the match; and Zbyszko, despite being obviously stripped of a title he had not legitimately won, won it legitimately in the tournament that subsequently took place.

Brooks left Georgia and went to Southwest Championship Wrestling (SCW) in San Antonio, Texas. During his stint in SWC Brooks won the SCW Southwest Heavyweight Championship on two occasions.

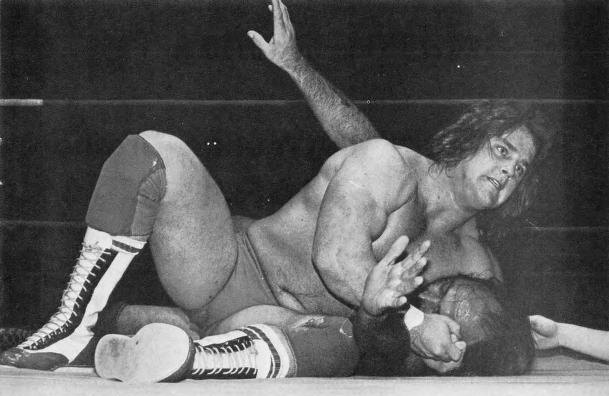
Brooks (bottom) wrestling Brett Wayne, c. 1983

He went to work in 1985 in Puerto Rico for the World Wrestling Council and feuded with Hercules Ayala in a variety of matches that included a cage match, a dog collar match and a barbed wire match. He returned in 1987 and had a feud with Miguel Pérez that started when he squashed a plate of rice and beans in Pérez's face, following his match with Chicky Starr. He later teamed up with Eric Embry in a feud with the Youngblood brothers, Mark and Chris.

In 1986, Brooks made appearances in the Montreal territory (Lutte Internationale) under the moniker of "Buster Brody", Bruiser Brody's kayfabe brother. He was presented in a straight jacket and under the control of the Creatchmans, Eddie Creatchman and son, Floyd Creatchman.

In 1990, Brooks started the NAWA Pro Wrestling school. He ran shows weekly at the Stagecoach Ballroom in Ft. Worth, TX on Mondays and the Longhorn Ballroom in Dallas, TX on Tuesday nights. The Longhorn show led to TV tapings that aired on KXTX channel 39 in the DFW metroplex. The TV shows used many local talent including, Johnny Mantel, John Tatum, Scott Casey, and many of his students including Bullman Downs and Kenny the Stinger.

Brooks retired in 1998 and was the owner and head trainer of the North American Wrestling Allegiance Pro Wrestling School, a training facility for his promotion N.A.W.A Pro Wrestling which runs televised shows in the Dallas-Ft. Worth, Texas area. Brooks trained many Texas area wrestlers. He was also credited as training Keith Lee.

== Personal life ==
Brooks was married three times during his life and had three sons from his first two marriages and a daughter from a relationship with professional wrestler Sandy Partlow. Brooks later reconciled with his daughter in the last ten years of his life.

After a long battle with cancer, Brooks died on June 30, 2020, at the age of 73.

== Championships and accomplishments ==
- Big D Pro Wrestling
  - Big D Heavyweight Championship (1 time)
- Big Time Wrestling
  - NWA World Tag Team Championship (Detroit version) (3 times) – with Ben Justice (2), and Abdullah the Butcher (1)
- Cauliflower Alley Club
  - Other inductee (2006)
- Georgia Championship Wrestling
  - NWA National Heavyweight Championship (1 time)
- North American Wrestling Alliance
  - NAWA Heavyweight Championship (2 times)
  - NAWA Tag Team Championship (4 times) - Johnny Mantell (2) and Bullman Downs
- NWA Big Time Wrestling - World Class Championship Wrestling
  - NWA American Tag Team Championship (1 time) – with Armand Hussein
  - NWA Texas Heavyweight Championship (1 time)
  - NWA Texas Tag Team Championship (3 times) – with Stan Hansen (1), Leroy Brown (1), and Stan Stasiak (1)
  - NWA World Six-Man Tag Team Championship (Texas version) (1 time) – with Mark Lewin and One Man Gang
  - WCCW Television Championship (1 time)
- NWA Western States Sports
  - NWA Western States Tag Team Championship (1 time) - with Gypsy Joe
- Pacific Northwest Wrestling
  - NWA Pacific Northwest Tag Team Championship (1 time) – with Roddy Piper
- Professional Wrestling Hall of Fame and Museum
  - Class of 2020
- Southwest Championship Wrestling
  - SCW Southwest Heavyweight Championship (2 times)
- Stampede Wrestling
  - Stampede North American Heavyweight Championship (1 time)
- Texas Wrestling Hall of Fame
  - Inductee (2008)
