= Tully Blanchard =

American professional wrestler and manager (born 1954)

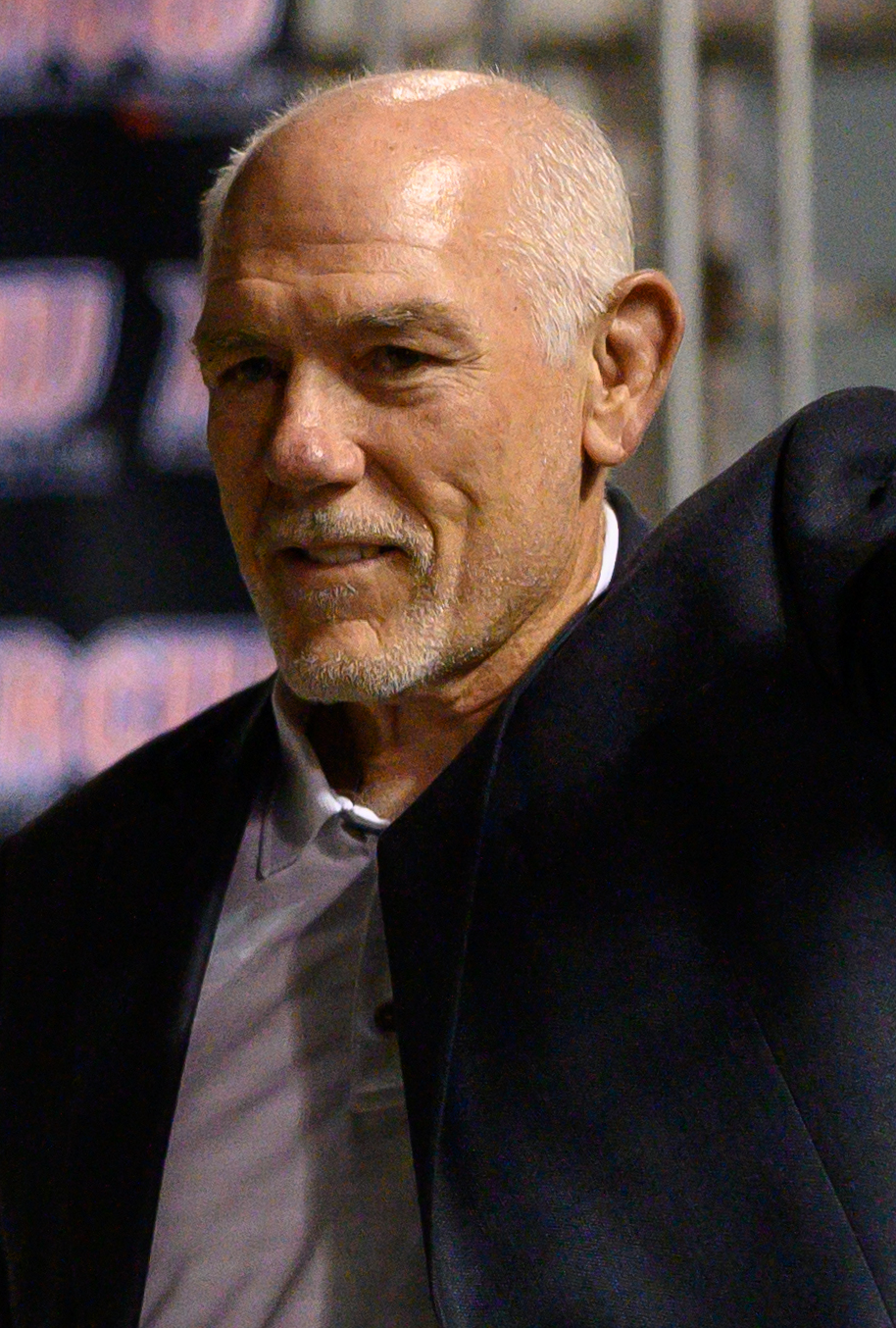
- Blanchard in 2019

Personal information
- Born: Tully Arthur Blanchard; January 22, 1954 (age 72) Calgary, Alberta, Canada
- Education: West Texas State University
- Spouses: Elizabeth Boyles (m. 1978; div. 1980) Courtney Shattuck (m. 1982; div. 2000)
- Children: 4; including Tessa
- Family: Joe Blanchard (father)

Professional wrestling career
- Ring name(s): The Midnight Stallion; The Outlaw; Tully Blanchard
- Billed height: 5 ft 10 in (178 cm)
- Billed weight: 225 lb (102 kg)
- Billed from: San Antonio, Texas; Charlotte, North Carolina
- Trained by: Joe Blanchard; José Lothario
- Debut: 1975

Tully Arthur Blanchard (born January 22, 1954) is an American-Canadian professional wrestler and manager. He is best known for his appearances with Jim Crockett Promotions and the World Wrestling Federation in the mid-to-late 1980s as a member of The Four Horsemen and the Brain Busters. Championships held by Blanchard over his career include the NWA Television Championship, NWA World Tag Team Championship, WWF World Tag Team Championship, and NWA United States Heavyweight Championship. He was inducted into the NWA Hall of Fame in 2009 and the WWE Hall of Fame in 2012.

Blanchard's father Joe Blanchard was also a professional wrestler, as is his daughter Tessa Blanchard.

== Early life ==
As the son of wrestling promoter and former American Wrestling Association star Joe Blanchard, Tully Blanchard was involved in professional wrestling at a very young age. He began selling programs and refreshments at the arenas at the age of ten, and worked as a referee when he was older.

Blanchard attended West Texas State University, where he played American football, first as a quarterback and then as a defensive end, alongside fellow future wrestlers Tito Santana and Ted DiBiase.

== Professional wrestling career ==
=== Southwest Championship Wrestling (1975–1984) ===
Blanchard was trained to wrestle by his father and José Lothario, debuting in 1975 in his father's promotion, Southwest Championship Wrestling, where he also held a number of backstage production and creative positions. He began his career as a face by tag teaming with his father in a feud against Dory Funk, Jr. and Terry Funk.

Between 1978 and 1983, Blanchard held the SCW Southwest Television Championship and SCW Southwest Heavyweight Championship on seven occasions. He formed heel tag team with Gino Hernandez, "The Dynamic Duo". They held the Texas All-Star USA Tag Team Championship on five occasions and the SCW World Tag Team Championship on one occasion in the early 1980s.

In 1984, Blanchard left SCW for Jim Crockett Promotions.

=== Jim Crockett Promotions (1984–1988) ===
==== Television Champion; United States Heavyweight Champion (1984–1985) ====
In March 1984, Blanchard joined Jim Crockett Promotions / Mid-Atlantic Championship Wrestling (MACW). Blanchard swiftly defeated Mark Youngblood for the NWA Television Championship, and defended the title against contenders such as Ricky Steamboat, whom he defeated at Starrcade '84: The Million Dollar Challenge in December 1984.

In January 1985, Blanchard began a feud with Dusty Rhodes over the Television Championship. In February 1985, Blanchard introduced Baby Doll as his new valet. On March 16, 1985, at the Silver Star '85 show, Rhodes defeated Blanchard for the Television Championship (which was renamed the NWA World Television Championship), ending Blanchard's 353-day reign. The two men continued to feud over the title, with Blanchard regaining it from Rhodes in April 1985, then losing it back to Rhodes in July 1985 at the inaugural Great American Bash in a steel cage match. As a stipulation of the match, Rhodes also won the services of Baby Doll for 30 days, with vignettes airing in which Rhodes tried to turn her into a "real lady."

After Blanchard's feud with Rhodes ended, he began pursuing the NWA United States Heavyweight Championship held by Magnum T. A.. Much like his feud with Dusty Rhodes, Blanchard's rivalry with Magnum escalated into a series of bloody and brutal matches, and became one of the top feuds in the NWA. On July 21, 1985, Blanchard defeated Magnum for the United States Heavyweight Championship by punching him with a foreign object in his hand given to him by Baby Doll, who came to ringside dressed as a security guard. The feud culminated in December 1985 at Starrcade '85: The Gathering during a brutal and extremely bloody "I quit" match held inside a steel cage. The match ended with Magnum driving a piece of a broken wooden chair into Blanchard's forehead, which was already deeply cut and bleeding profusely, forcing him to submit and concede the title. Blanchard subsequently fired Baby Doll as his manager, slapping her during an interview segment and reigniting his feud with Dusty Rhodes, who came to her aid. J. J. Dillon then became Blanchard's manager.

==== The Four Horsemen (1986–1988) ====
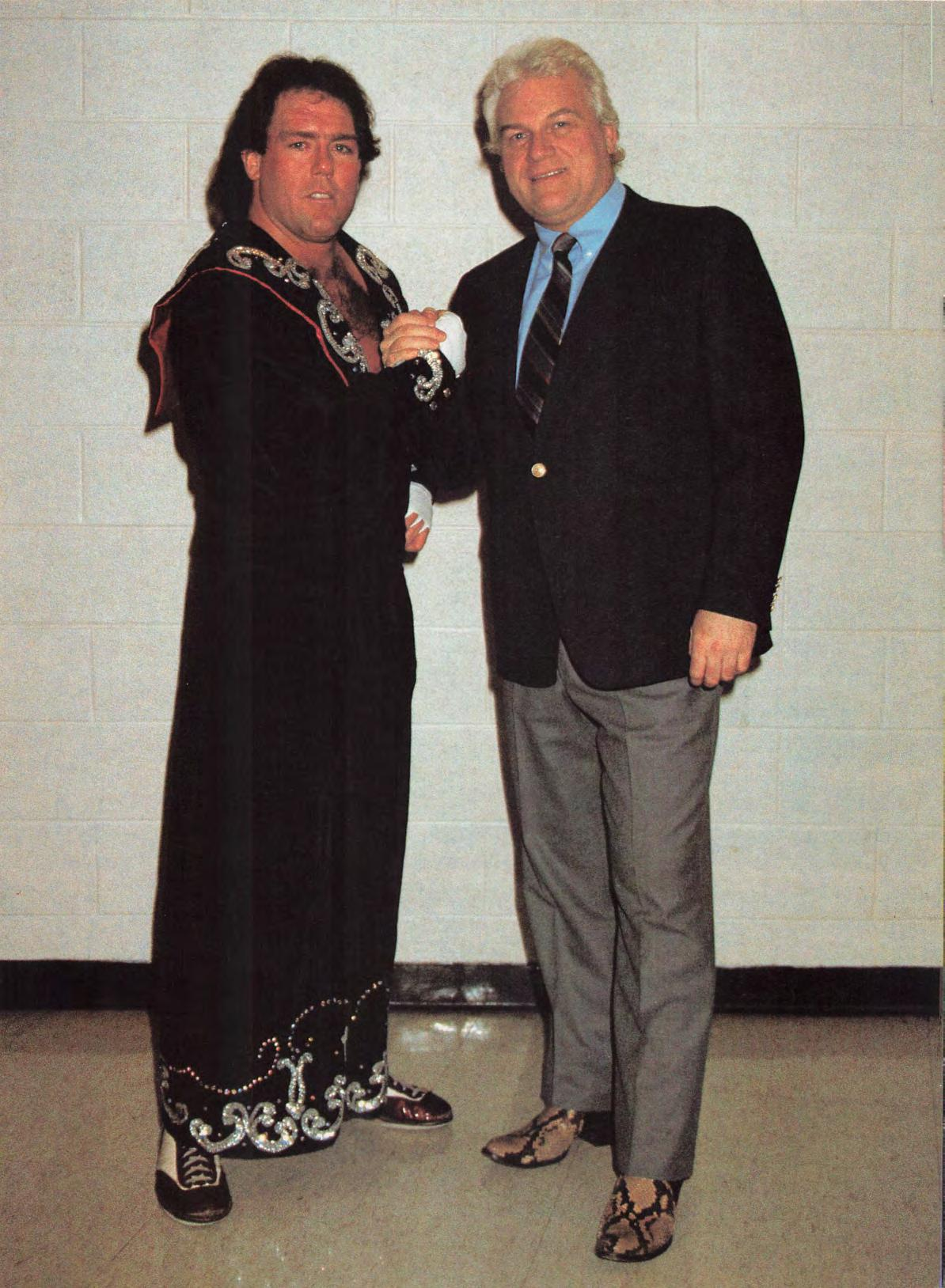
Blanchard alongside JJ Dillon, c. 1986

Throughout the latter half of 1985, Blanchard and a number of high-profile wrestlers in the company had often competed together, usually in variations of tag team matches or interfering in one another's matches if they appeared to be losing. These wrestlers included Ole Anderson, who had long since become a legendary figure in the Mid-Atlantic and Georgia territories, rising star Arn Anderson and Ric Flair, the biggest star in the promotion and NWA World Heavyweight Champion. In early-1986, the foursome became a solidified group and called themselves the Four Horsemen. The group quickly established dominance within the territory by capturing numerous championships with Arn being the NWA World Television Champion simultaneously, Blanchard winning the NWA National Heavyweight Championship in March 1986 and with Flair as the NWA World Champion. The Horsemen feuded with the top baby faces of the territory including Magnum T. A., Nikita Koloff, Dusty Rhodes, Wahoo McDaniel, The Rock 'n' Roll Express, and The Road Warriors.

The Horsemen continued to feud with the other top stars of the NWA throughout 1986, particularly after forcing out Ole Anderson and replacing him with Lex Luger. In August 1986, Blanchard lost the NWA National Heavyweight Championship to McDaniel. At Starrcade '86: The Skywalkers in November 1986, Blanchard defeated Dusty Rhodes in a first blood match to win the NWA World Television Championship for a third time.

By mid-1987, Blanchard and Anderson began competing regularly on the tag team circuit and quickly entered into a feud with the Rock 'n' Roll Express over the NWA World Tag Team Championship. The feud culminated in late September after Blanchard and Anderson won the titles after a number of high-profile matches.

Toward the end of 1987 Lex Luger defected from the Horsemen and feuded with all of them over the course of the next several months. Luger quickly formed a partnership with Barry Windham and competed in the tag team division as well. The new duo defeated Anderson and Blanchard on March 27, 1988, though they would lose the titles back to them a little more than a month later after Windham turned on Luger and became the newest Horseman.

After clashing with Jim Crockett and booker Dusty Rhodes about their pay, Blanchard and Arn Anderson left MACW in September 1988, losing in an 11th-hour title change to the Midnight Express after a brief feud. Fellow Horseman Barry Windham and manager J. J. Dillon would leave later for similar reasons; Ric Flair, meanwhile, considered leaving but decided to stay when the NWA re-signed his old friend Ricky Steamboat and put them in a program together.

=== World Wrestling Federation (1988–1989) ===
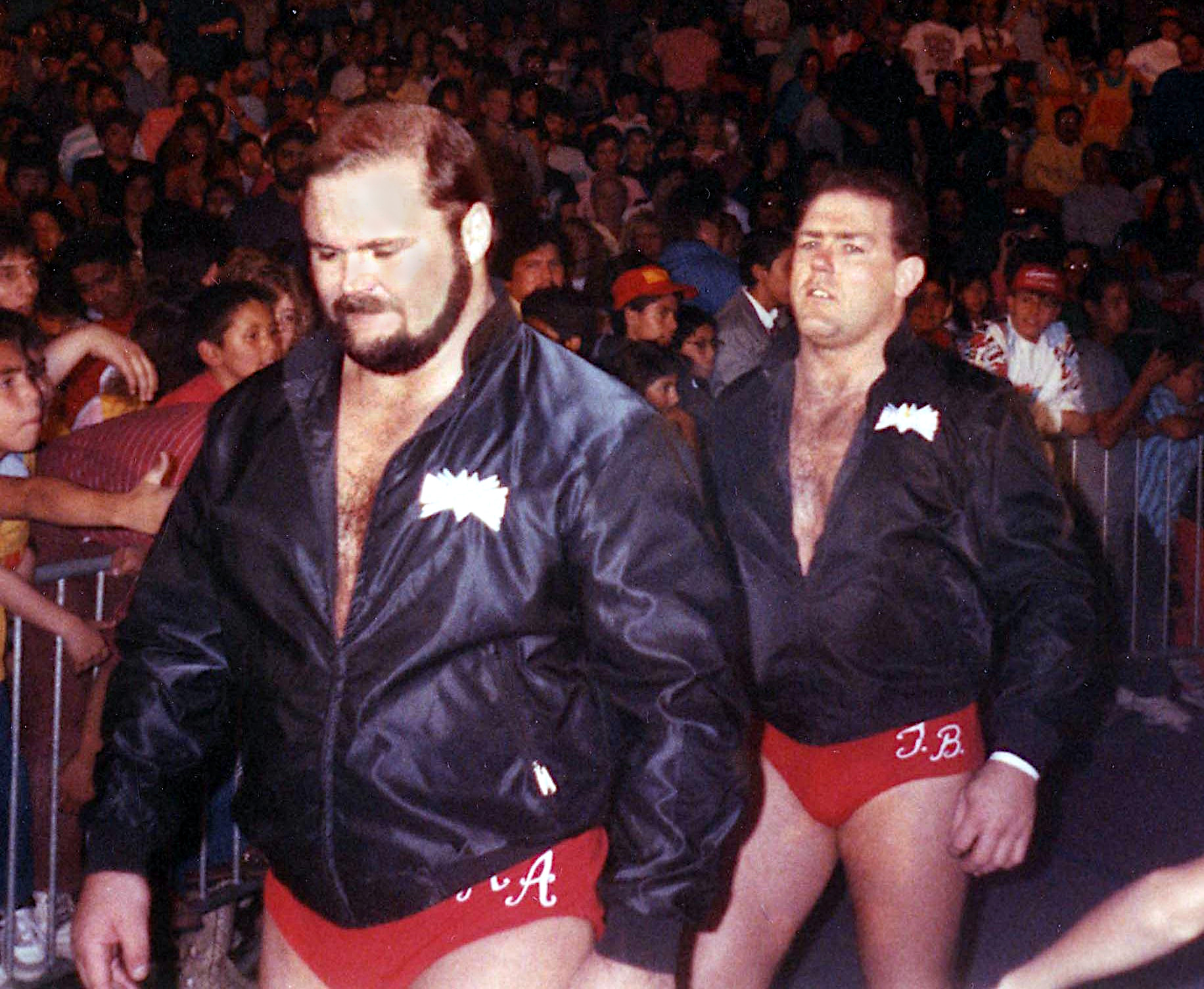
Blanchard (right) with his tag team partner Arn Anderson as the Brain Busters in 1989

Leaving Jim Crockett Promotions in September 1988, the following month Blanchard and Anderson joined Vince McMahon's World Wrestling Federation (WWF). Upon arrival, they were given Bobby "The Brain" Heenan as their manager, joining his Heenan Family stable, and dubbed the "Brain Busters". They competed in the tag team division against teams such as the Young Stallions and the Rockers. At Survivor Series in November 1988, the Brain Busters took part in a 10 team elimination match, teaming with Demolition, the Bolsheviks, Los Conquistadores, and the Fabulous Rougeaus in a loss to the British Bulldogs, Hart Foundation, Powers of Pain, Rockers, and Young Stallions. In January 1989, Blanchard entered the Royal Rumble, but was eliminated by Hulk Hogan. Following the Royal Rumble, the Brain Busters wrestled a lengthy series of matches against the Rockers. At WrestleMania V in April 1989, they defeated Strike Force after Rick Martel abandoned his partner Tito Santana.

At Saturday Night's Main Event XXI in April 1989, the Brain Busters challenged Demolition for the WWF Tag Team Championship, winning by disqualification. After a series of matches against the Bushwhackers, the Brain Busters faced Demolition in a rematch at Saturday Night's Main Event XXII in July 1989, winning the titles and ending Demolition's record 478 day reign after Heenan Family member André the Giant interfered on their behalf. At SummerSlam in August 1989, they defeated the Hart Foundation in a non-title match. Following a series of title defences against Demolition, the Brain Busters lost the titles back to Demolition on WWF Superstars in October 1989. The Brain Busters faced Demolition in a series of rematches over the following weeks but failed to regain the titles.

At Saturday Night's Main Event XXIV at the end of October 1989, the Brain Busters lost to the Rockers in a two out of three falls match; this was Blanchard's final match in the WWF. Around this time, Anderson and Blanchard had given their notice to the WWF amidst plans to return to WCW and reform the Four Horsemen. After Blanchard failed a drug test, testing positive for cocaine and causing his premature departure from the WWF and the withdrawal of his employment offer by WCW head Jim Herd, which in turn caused Herd to also reduce Arn Anderson's contract offer from $250,000 per year to $150,000. Heenan replaced Blanchard as part of the Heenan Family team at the Survivor Series five days later.

=== Late career (1989–2019) ===
Blanchard debuted in the Minneapolis, Minnesota-based American Wrestling Association (AWA) in March 1990, aligning himself with the Destruction Crew. At SuperClash IV on April 8, 1990, he defeated Tommy Jammer. He made his final appearance with the AWA in May 1990.

In 1993, World Championship Wrestling offered Blanchard a US$500 per appearance contract to reform The Four Horsemen at Slamboree 1993. Blanchard did not accept the offer, considering the offer to be too low, and WCW replaced him with Paul Roma. One year later, at Slamboree 1994, Blanchard appeared with WCW for a single night, wrestling Terry Funk to a double disqualification.

In January 1995, Blanchard debuted in the Philadelphia, Pennsylvania-based Extreme Championship Wrestling promotion, wrestling ECW World Heavyweight Champion Shane Douglas to a time limit draw. He challenged Douglas again in February and March, losing on both occasions.

On September 12, 1998, Blanchard teamed up with fellow Four Horseman alumnus, Barry Windham, and defeated the Border Patrol to win the NWA World Tag Team Titles.

In October 1998, he appeared at the NWA 50th Anniversary Show, teaming with Tom Prichard in a four-way tag match as The Brotherhood (Knuckles Nelson and Eric Sbraccia) and won the NWA Tag Team titles.

He defeated Stan Lane at the Heroes of Wrestling PPV on October 10, 1999.

In the mid-2000s, Blanchard briefly worked for World Wrestling Entertainment (WWE) as a producer.

On January 29, 2005, at WrestleReunion, Blanchard lost to Jeff Jarrett. On August 10, 2007, he lost to Dustin Rhodes at an National Wrestling Alliance Legends Fanfest in Charlotte, North Carolina.

He appeared prominently in the 2007 DVD Ric Flair and the Four Horsemen. On the March 31, 2008, edition of WWE Raw, Blanchard reunited with Arn Anderson, J. J. Dillon, and Barry Windham to salute the recently retired Ric Flair. In November 2008, he hosted part 2 of the 5 part Essential Starrcade series on WWE 24/7 Classics on Demand as well as appearing in one of the matches. On March 31, 2012, Tully Blanchard was inducted into the WWE Hall of Fame as a member of The Four Horsemen.

Blanchard was the head booker of the NWA New Beginnings territory in Charlotte, North Carolina and was a backstage agent for the wrestling shows staged as part of the 2010 and 2011 NWA Legends Convention.

On April 27, 2016, Blanchard appeared alongside Ric Flair and Arn Anderson in an episode of Table For 3 on WWE Network, where the three former members of the Horsemen discussed their lives during and after their years as a team.

=== All Elite Wrestling (2019–2022) ===
==== Managing FTR (2019–2022) ====
Blanchard made a surprise appearance during a sit down interview with Jim Ross and Shawn Spears on AEW's "Road to All Out" YouTube series that premiered July 17, 2019. It was announced the following day that Blanchard had signed a multi-show deal to serve as an "exclusive advisor" for Shawn Spears in All Elite Wrestling. At All Out, Blanchard accompanied Spears for his match against Cody, but in a losing effort after interference from Blanchard's former Four Horsemen stablemate, Arn Anderson, who delivered a spinebuster on Spears and chased Blanchard out of the arena. At Full Gear, Blanchard helped Spears defeat Joey Janela by delivering an assisted piledriver on the concrete. In February 2020, Blanchard and Spears began a campaign to recruit a new tag team partner for Spears. However, the angle was dropped due to the COVID-19 pandemic and Blanchard being unable to appear on television. On the June 3 episode of AEW Dynamite, Blanchard returned and berated Spears for making a joke out of himself at Double or Nothing. He then presented Spears with a black glove similar to the one worn by Blackjack Mulligan and Ted Dibiase. Blanchard officially aligned with FTR on August 22, leading Dax Harwood and Cash Wheeler to defeat Kenny Omega and Adam Page for the AEW World Tag Team Championship at All Out. On the March 3, 2021, special episode of Dynamite (entitled "The Crossroads"), Tully had his first match in 14 years, teaming with FTR to defeat Jurassic Express in a match where they were managed by J. J. Dillon. On March 10, Blanchard, Spears and FTR joined the faction led by MJF named The Pinnacle. On the March 9th, 2022 episode of Dynamite Tully was fired by FTR as their manager after a disagreement of what FTR's focus as a team should be.

==== Tully Blanchard Enterprises (2022) ====
After getting fired by FTR, Blanchard was moved to AEW's sister promotion Ring of Honor (ROH). In ROH, Blanchard managed the Gates of Agony (Toa Liona and Kaun) and Brian Cage, collectively known as "Tully Blanchard Enterprises". During the July 23, 2022, Death Before Dishonor, a storyline revealed that Prince Nana had purchased Tully Blanchard Enterprises from Blanchard. It was soon revealed that the group would now be going under The Embassy name, the long-time group associated with Nana dating back to 2004. Blanchard subsequently departed AEW and ROH.

== Personal life ==
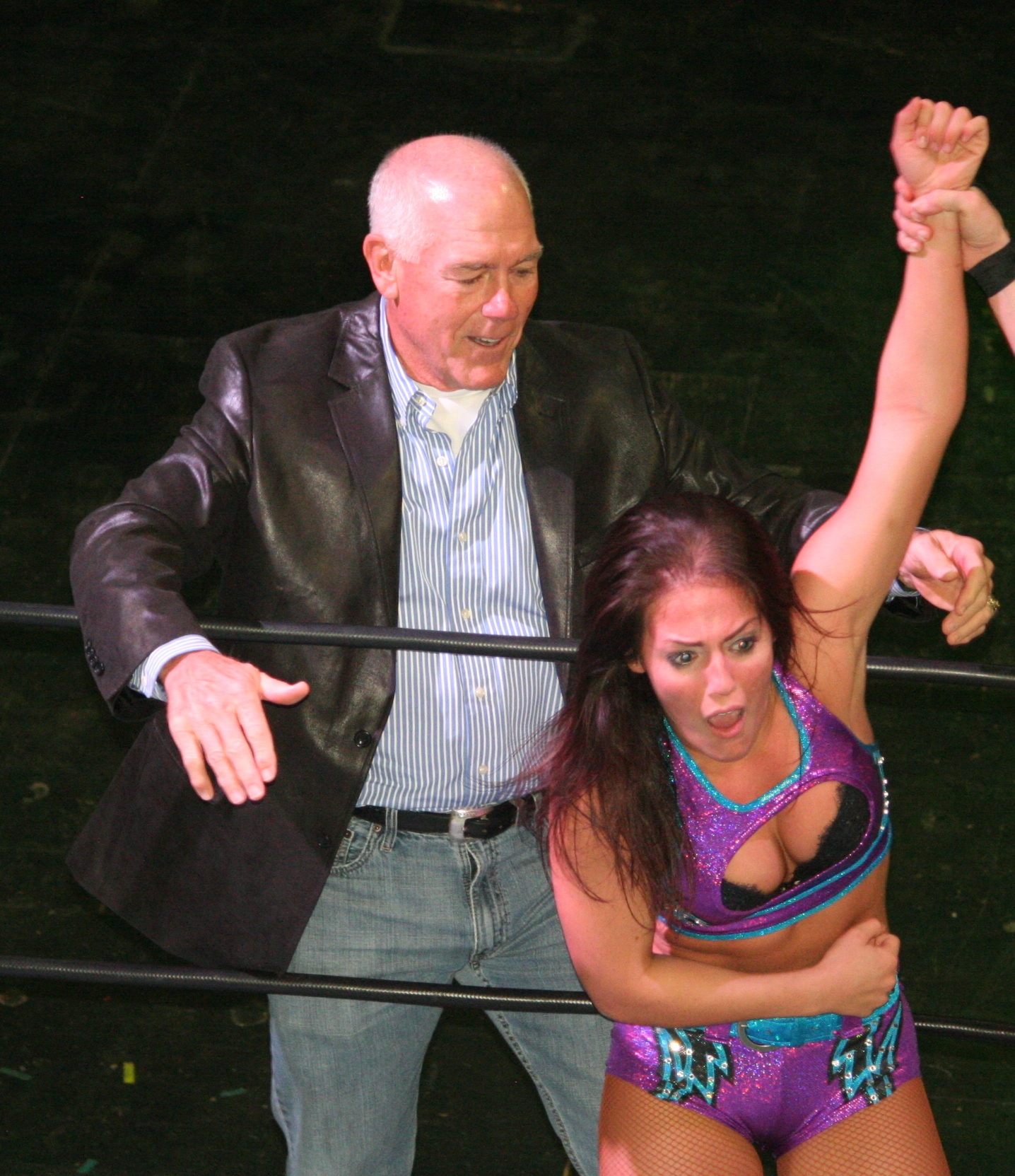
Blanchard with his daughter Tessa Blanchard in 2014

Blanchard was first married on May 7, 1978, to Elizabeth Diane Boyles in Bexar County, Texas. However, the marriage ended in divorce on June 30, 1980.

Blanchard later married Courtney Shattuck. Together, they had four children: Taylor, Tanner, Tessa and Tally. They later divorced with Courtney marrying another former wrestler, Magnum T. A., in March 2005. He says it took him twenty years to come to terms with his and his wife's falling-out and his relatively sparse presence in his children's lives.

Blanchard became a born-again Christian on November 13, 1989. He currently has a prison ministry, where he preaches to inmates. In 2010 Tully Blanchard joined International Network of Prison Ministries, where he serves on the Board of Advisers.

== Championships and accomplishments ==
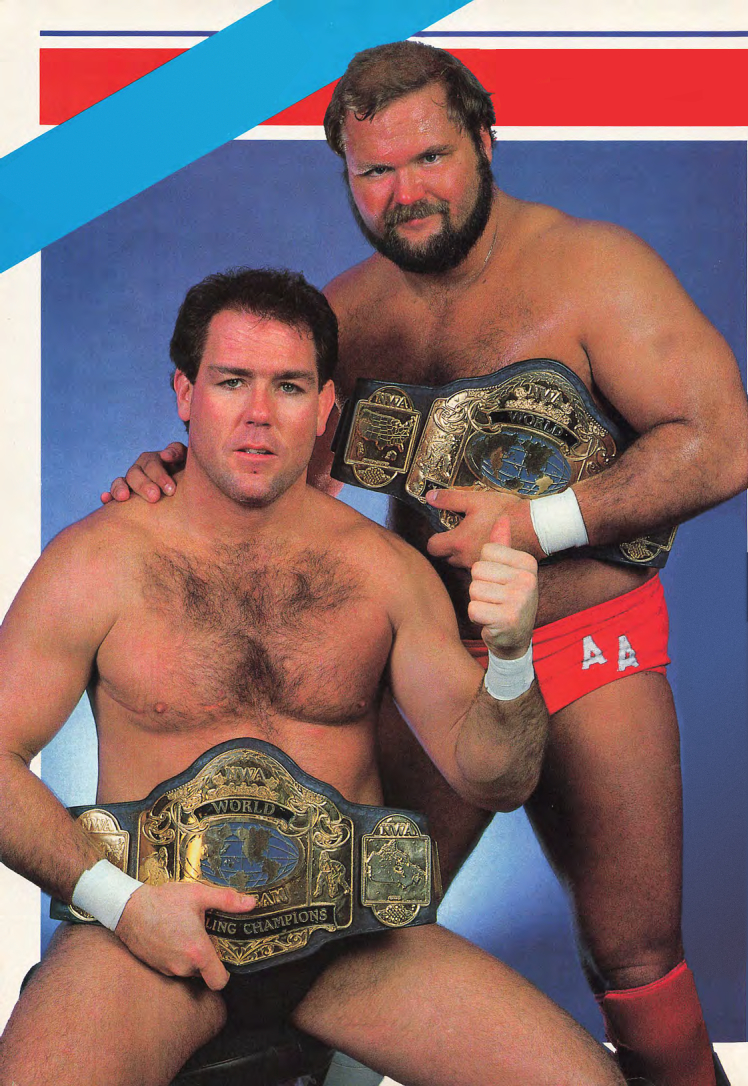
Blanchard (left) and Arn Anderson as NWA World Tag Team Champions, c. 1989

- Cauliflower Alley Club
  - Iron Mike Award (2017)
- Central States Wrestling
  - NWA Central States Heavyweight Championship (1 time)
- Mid-Atlantic Championship Wrestling
  - NWA World Television Championship (3 times)
  - NWA National Heavyweight Championship (1 time)^{1}
  - NWA United States Heavyweight Championship (Mid Atlantic version) (1 time)
  - NWA World Tag Team Championship (Mid-Atlantic version) (2 times) – with Arn Anderson
- National Wrestling Alliance
  - NWA United States Heavyweight Championship (1 time)
  - NWA United States Heavyweight Championship Tournament (1997)
  - NWA Hall of Fame (Class of 2009)
- New Dimension Wrestling
  - NDW Heavyweight Championship (2 times)
- NWA All-Star Wrestling (North Carolina)^{2}
  - NWA World Tag Team Championship (1 time) – with Barry Windham
- Pro Wrestling Illustrated
  - PWI Feud of the Year (1987) Four Horsemen vs. The Super Powers and The Road Warriors
  - PWI Tag Team of the Year (1989) with Arn Anderson
  - PWI ranked him #52 of the top 500 singles wrestlers of the "PWI Years" in 2003
- Southwest Championship Wrestling
  - SCW Southwest Heavyweight Championship (6 times^{3})
  - SCW Southwest Television Championship (3 times)
  - SCW World Tag Team Championship (2 times) – with Gino Hernandez
  - SCW Southwest Tag Team Championship (5 times) – with Gino Hernandez
- World Wrestling Federation/WWE
  - WWF Tag Team Championship (1 time) – with Arn Anderson
  - WWE Hall of Fame (Class of 2012) as a member of The Four Horsemen
- Wrestling Observer Newsletter
  - Worst Feud of the Year (1988) vs. The Midnight Rider

^{1}Typically defended in Georgia, the title was won after Georgia Championship Wrestling was purchased by the World Wrestling Federation.
^{2}Not to be confused with the Vancouver, British Columbia based promotion that existed from the early '60s to the late '80s. This North Carolina promotion lasted from March 1998 until January 1999.
^{3}The last TV title he won on January 12, 1979, was renamed to Heavyweight title in February 1979.
