= Joe Blanchard =

American football player & wrestler (1928–2012)

Personal information
- Born: Joseph Edgar Blanchard; December 7, 1928 Haskell, Oklahoma, U.S.
- Died: March 22, 2012 (aged 83) San Antonio, Texas, U.S.
- Cause of death: Squamous-cell carcinoma
- Education: Kansas State University
- Children: 2, including Tully Blanchard
- Family: Tessa Blanchard (granddaughter)

Professional wrestling career
- Ring name(s): Joe Blanchard; Joltin' Joe
- Billed height: 6 ft 0 in (183 cm)
- Billed weight: 225 lb (102 kg)
- Debut: 1953
- Retired: December 1984

Joseph Edgar Blanchard (December 7, 1928 – March 22, 2012) was an American football player, professional wrestler, and professional wrestling promoter. From 1978 to 1985, he operated the Southwest Championship Wrestling promotion in San Antonio, Texas.

Blanchard's son is original Four Horseman member Tully Blanchard and his granddaughter is former TNA World Champion Tessa Blanchard.

== Gridiron football career ==
Blanchard graduated from Kansas State University where he played football and was a star for the college wrestling team and won the Big 7 Conference wrestling tournament in 1950.

Blanchard played his first three seasons of professional football with the Edmonton Eskimos in the Canadian Football League, eventually playing in the 1952 Grey Cup, a 21–11 loss to the Toronto Argonauts. His teammates included future pro wrestling stars Gene Kiniski and Wilbur Snyder, along with Ted Tully.

His last football season was with the Calgary Stampeders in 1954.

== Professional wrestling career ==
In 1953, Blanchard made his debut in professional wrestling in Calgary for Stampede Wrestling. Within all the territories he wrestled, he had the most success in Hawaii for 50th State Big Time Wrestling (twice winning the NWA Hawaii Tag Team Championship with Lord James Blears) and in Texas for NWA Big Time Wrestling (twice winning the NWA Texas Heavyweight Championship).

In 1978, Blanchard founded Southwest Championship Wrestling (SCW) in San Antonio, Texas, where he retired from active competition later that year after 25 years. He returned to the ring in December 1984 for one final match, losing to Jonathan Boyd. Blanchard ran the promotion until April 1985 when he sold it to Fred Behrend (who changed its name to Texas All-Star Wrestling).

In 1989, Blanchard joined the American Wrestling Association (AWA), replacing Stanley Blackburn as its figurehead president. He would remain with the promotion until its closure in 1991.

Blanchard trained Dusty Rhodes, King Curtis Iaukea, and his son, Tully Blanchard.

== Death ==
Joe Blanchard died of squamous-cell carcinoma on March 22, 2012. He was 83.

== Championship and Accomplishments ==
- 50th State Big Time Wrestling
  - NWA Hawaii Tag Team Championship (2 times) - with Lord James Blears
- George Tragos/Lou Thesz Professional Wrestling Hall of Fame
  - Class of 2016
- NWA Big Time Wrestling
  - NWA Texas Heavyweight Championship (2 times)

== See also ==
- List of professional wrestling promoters
- List of gridiron football players who became professional wrestlers
