= Dick Murdoch =

American professional wrestler (1946–1996)

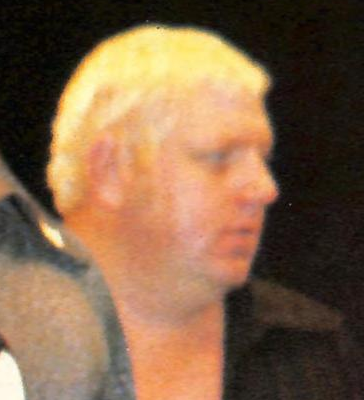
- Murdoch, c. 1983

Personal information
- Born: Hoyt Richard Murdoch; August 16, 1946 Waxahachie, Texas, U.S.
- Died: June 15, 1996 (aged 49) Amarillo, Texas, U.S.
- Cause of death: Myocardial infarction
- Education: West Texas State University
- Children: 1
- Family: Frankie Murdoch (father); Killer Tim Brooks (cousin)

Professional wrestling career
- Ring name(s): Big Daddy Murdoch; Black Ace; Dick Murdoch; The Invader; Ron Carson; Super Rodeo Machine; The Texan
- Billed height: 6 ft 4 in (193 cm)
- Billed weight: 288 lb (131 kg)
- Billed from: Waxahachie, Texas
- Trained by: Killer Karl Kox; Bob Geigel; Pat O'Connor
- Debut: 1965

Hoyt Richard Murdoch (August 16, 1946 – June 15, 1996) was an American professional wrestler, better known by his ring names "Dirty" Dick Murdoch and "Captain Redneck". He was best known for his time in the NWA, World Wrestling Federation and New Japan Pro-Wrestling.

Murdoch started his wrestling career in 1965, and three years later, he began teaming with long-time partner Dusty Rhodes as the Texas Outlaws. After they split up, Murdoch wrestled for several territories including the National Wrestling Alliance's Florida Championship Wrestling, and Mid-South Wrestling, also touring overseas. He joined the World Wrestling Federation in 1984 and teamed with Adrian Adonis to form the North-South Connection, winning the WWF Tag Team Championship.

In 1981, Murdoch gained international exposure by joining New Japan Pro-Wrestling and stayed there until 1989. He later wrestled for Jim Crockett Promotions, engaging in feuds with the likes of Ric Flair, Nikita Koloff, and Dusty Rhodes. He also worked for World Championship Wrestling in 1991 as part of a tag team with Dick Slater until going into semi-retirement, while making appearances at Slamboree '93: A Legends' Reunion, the 1995 Royal Rumble, and Slamboree '95: A Legends' Reunion.

== Early life ==
Murdoch was the stepson of wrestler Frankie Hill Murdoch, growing up with fellow second-generation wrestlers Dory Funk Jr. and Terry Funk, watching their fathers wrestle all around Texas. He also toted wrestling bears around the street. Dick attended Caprock High School, where he took part in amateur wrestling.

== Professional wrestling career ==
=== Early career (1965–1981) ===
Murdoch started wrestling in 1965 as "Ron Carson", working in a tag team with Don Carson. He soon started wrestling under his real name and for territories within the National Wrestling Alliance. In 1968, he formed a championship winning tag team that would continue throughout the early 1970s with Dusty Rhodes called The Texas Outlaws, and during that time he adopted his Dick Murdoch name. One of his moves was the brainbuster, which he was taught by Killer Karl Kox. In November 1978, the Outlaws held the NWA Central States Tag Team Championship, as well as the NWA Florida Tag Team Championship for Championship Wrestling from Florida in late 1980. Also in 1980, Murdoch partially wrestled for All Japan Pro-Wrestling (where he had debuted in 1973), holding the NWA United National Championship from February 23 to March 5, when Jumbo Tsuruta captured the title.

=== Mid-South Wrestling (1979–1985) ===
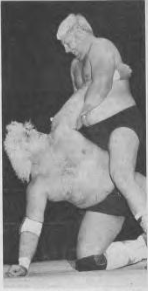
Murdoch in a match against Dusty Rhodes, c. 1982

Murdoch's most noted work as a wrestler came in Mid-South Wrestling in the early 1980s, where he teamed with Junkyard Dog. The pair was the most popular champions in the region, attracting the hardcore, working-class white fans with his "Captain Redneck" persona and Junkyard Dog drawing the support of the black fan base.

=== World Wrestling Federation (1983–1985) ===
In 1984, Murdoch went to the World Wrestling Federation and formed a tag team with Adrian Adonis called "North-South Connection", since Adrian was a New York (North) native while Dick was a Texas (South) native. Both men were involved in a series of vignettes alongside "Mean" Gene Okerlund, with both men visiting each other's hometowns, not being used with each other's urban and country lifestyles. On April 17, 1984, Murdoch and Adonis defeated Rocky Johnson and Tony Atlas to win the WWF World Tag Team Championship. They defended the titles against the likes of Jack Brisco and Jerry Brisco, The Wild Samoans (Afa and Sika) and Sgt. Slaughter and Terry Daniels. They lost the titles on January 21, 1985, to the U.S. Express, and Murdoch left the WWF not long after.

=== New Japan Pro-Wrestling (1981–1989) ===
In 1981, Murdoch started what truly would be his international exposure, by wrestling for New Japan Pro-Wrestling. He entered the MSG Tag League of that year, teaming with fellow Texan Stan Hansen, with the team finishing 3rd place with 36 points, scoring victories over teams such as El Canek and Super Maquina, Riki Choshu and Yoshiaki Yatsu, Seiji Sakaguchi and Kengo Kimura and Antonio Inoki and Tatsumi Fujinami.

In 1982, Murdoch returned for the MSG League 1982 tournament, finishing 4th place with 41 points, scoring victories over wrestlers like The Iron Sheik, Seiji Sakaguchi, Tatsumi Fujinami, Don Muraco and Tiger Toguchi. He also engaged in a few encounters with Hulk Hogan, which ended in double count-out or with Murdoch being disqualified. He once again entered the MSG Tag League, this time with the Masked Superstar with the team finishing 4th place with 21 points, scoring victories over teams such as El Canek and Perro Aguayo, Tiger Toguchi and Killer Khan and Dino Bravo and Murdoch's future tag team partner Adrian Adonis.

In 1983, he mainly feuded with Riki Choshu's Ishin Gundan, mainly wrestling Choshu, Killer Khan, Animal Hamaguchi and Yoshiaki Yatsu. He would once again enter the MSG Tag League of that year, this time teaming with Adonis, with the team reaching the finals with 27.5 points, in a losing effort against the winners Antonio Inoki and Hulk Hogan. A year later, after his team with Adonis officialized while both were in the WWF, they started regularly to team up against New Japan's top tag-team contenders and having encounters against Inoki, Fujinami, André the Giant, Gerry Morow, Strong Machines (#1 and #2) and other top threats. Both men individually entered the MSG League, in which Murdoch finished 5th place with 30 points, defeating Ken Patera, Big John Quinn, Otto Wanz and even his own partner Adonis. The team of Murdoch and Adonis entered the MSG Tag League of that year, once again reaching the finals with 23 points, but again coming up short against the winners Inoki and Fujinami.

In 1985, Murdoch entered the IWGP League, a single-elimination system-styled tournament, defeating Kengo Kimura in the first round, advancing to the quarterfinals in which he defeated Seiji Sakaguchi, until losing to Andre the Giant in the semi-finals. He and Adonis were wrestling in Japan while both were WWF Tag Team Champions, at one point successfully defending both belts against Kengo Kimura and Tatsumi Fujinami. After both men left the WWF, they wrestled full-time with New Japan Pro-Wrestling, once competing for the vacated WWF International Tag Team Championship against the team they defended their national belts, Kimura and Fujinami, in a losing effort. They tried to gain them in a rematch, but both men came up short. After failing to win the belts, Murdoch and Adonis parted ways and each man went singles competition. Murdoch would resume his singles career by feuding with Inoki and Fujinami, and also having bloody encounters with Abdullah The Butcher and Bruiser Brody. He reunited with the Masked Superstar to compete in the IWGP Tag Team League of that year, with both men finishing 4th place with 19 points, defeating the Kelly Twins (Mike and Pat), Dos Caras and El Canek, and Kendo Nagasaki and Mr. Pogo. In 1986, Murdoch started to feud with the new breed of wrestlers, such as Keiji Mutoh, Shinya Hashimoto, Tatsutoshi Goto and UWF crusaders Akira Maeda, Nobuhiko Takada, as well as veterans like Osamu Kido and Yoshiaki Fujiwara. Murdoch participated in the IWGP League of that year, wrestling his way to the finals, where he lost to Inoki. Later, he and Masked Superstar took another shot at the IWGP Tag Team League tournament, reaching the semifinals where they lost to Akira Maeda and Osamu Kido.

The following year saw Murdoch not having much exposure, as he was wrestling often in tag team action alongside younger foreign wrestlers, such as Scott Hall, Owen Hart, Matt Borne and The Cuban Assassin. Later, he found an uncommon tag team partnership with Inoki as both men competed in the Japan Cup Tag Team League together. They wrestled their way to the finals, where both men lost to Kengo Kimura and Tatsumi Fujinami.

In 1988, Adonis returned to NJPW, immediately reuniting with Murdoch, reforming their tag team, and later forming a trio with Owen Hart. Murdoch and Adonis' only title match occurred on June 23, where they unsuccessfully faced reigning IWGP Tag Team Champions Masa Saito and Riki Choshu. The duo teamed together until Adonis' death on July 4, and after that date, Murdoch would not return to Japan for 5 months. In November 1988, Murdoch returned to NJPW, taking part into the Japan Cup Tag Team Elimination League, a round-robin tournament of trios consisting of six-man tag team elimination matches. Murdoch teamed up with Scott Hall and Bob Orton Jr., wrestling their first tournament match on November 17, defeating the six-man combination of Antonio Inoki, Riki Choshu and Kantaro Hoshino, with Murdoch last eliminating Inoki with Orton's assistance. They suffered their first loss at the hands of Masa Saito, Tatsutoshi Goto and Seiji Sakaguchi, but quickly rebounded by defeating Super Strong Machine, The Tiger and The Jaguar, with Murdoch last eliminating the Strong Machine. They later defeated Kengo Kimura, Yoshiaki Fujiwara and Osamu Kido, even though Murdoch got eliminated by Kimura during the match, his team got the win after Orton last eliminated Fujiwara. Their winning streak continued when they defeated George Takano, Steve Armstrong and Tracy Smothers, after Murdoch last eliminated Takano. However, they suffered another loss at the hands of Tatsumi Fujinami, Shinya Hashimoto and Masahiro Chono, but once again quickly rebounded by defeating Hiro Saito, Shiro Koshinaka and Kuniaki Kobayashi, after Murdoch eliminated Kobayashi and Saito. After defeating Buzz Sawyer, Manny Fernandez and Kendo Nagasaki by forfeit, they once again faced the Saito, Sakaguchi and Goto combination. In what would seem to be another loss after Hall and Orton were the two first eliminated, Murdoch single handedly eliminated Sakaguchi and Saito, before finally making quick work out of Goto, eliminating him and avenging their loss. However, the team couldn't reach the finals due to the two losses they suffered.

The year of 1989 saw Murdoch's last stand with New Japan, as he briefly returned in July, facing the likes of Shinya Hashimoto, Hiroshi Hase, Vladimir Berkovich, and Evgeny Artyukhin. His last match occurred on August 5, where he defeated Berkovich.

=== Jim Crockett Promotions/World Championship Wrestling (1986–1989; 1991) ===
Murdoch briefly wrestled in Mid-South Wrestling again in 1985, and visited Bremen, Germany in 1986 for an unsuccessful challenge to CWA World Heavyweight Champion Otto Wanz, before joining Jim Crockett Promotions later in 1986 as a babyface. He feuded with Ric Flair and campaigned in matches for Flair's NWA World Heavyweight Championship. He also teamed with Ron Garvin against Flair and the Four Horsemen.

In early 1987, Murdoch turned heel and joined Ivan Koloff and Vladimir Petrov in their attempt to get Nikita Koloff and Dusty Rhodes. Then a NWA United States Tag Team Champion with Ivan, he injured Nikita's neck after a brainbuster on the floor that summer, resulting in his (kayfabe) suspension for 30 days and the team being stripped of the title. After the summer of 1988, he would turn face again and reunite with Dusty in a feud with Gary Hart's team of Garvin, who had at that time recently turned heel on Rhodes, and Al Perez. He left the NWA and wrestled in Puerto Rico and Japan.

Murdoch returned to World Championship Wrestling as one half of the "Hardliners," with Dick Slater in 1991. Once again a heel by this point, the Hardliners debuted as a team on June 12 at Clash of the Champions XV, attacking the Steiner Brothers, Hiroshi Hase and Masahiro Chono after an IWGP Tag Team Championship match between the two teams. They would feud with the Steiners, but Scott suffered an injury, so instead, they wrestled Rick and his different tag team partners throughout the summer.

=== Late career (1989–1996) ===
After leaving WCW in 1989, Murdoch went to Frontier Martial-Arts Wrestling in Japan from 1989 to 1990. In 1991, he worked in Puerto Rico for the World Wrestling Council, where he won the WWC Television Championship from TNT on November 23, 1991. A month later, he dropped the title to Invader 1. On October 25, 1992, he defeated Invader 1 for the WWC Universal Heavyweight Championship, and also a month later, he dropped the title to Carlos Colon.

He returned to Japan working for W*ING, WAR and IWA Japan from 1992 to 1994. On May 23, 1993, at Slamboree '93: A Legends' Reunion, Murdoch teamed with Don Muraco and Jimmy Snuka, fighting Blackjack Mulligan, Jim Brunzell, and Wahoo McDaniel to a no-contest. He made a one-night appearance for Extreme Championship Wrestling's Super Summer Sizzler Spectacular on June 19, where he defeated Dark Patriot II. From 1993 to 1994, he worked in Smoky Mountain Wrestling, feuding with Bob Armstrong; during one match, Armstrong held him in a headlock for 23 minutes, and Murdoch worked many ways in and out of the headlock, entertaining the audience.

On January 22, 1995, Murdoch made a surprise appearance with the World Wrestling Federation as the twenty-seventh entrant in the WWF Royal Rumble, but was eliminated by Henry O. Godwinn. He also briefly worked as the manager of Bob Backlund at house shows.

Murdoch was defeated by Wahoo McDaniel on May 21, 1995, at Slamboree. His last match was a victory over Rod Price at a show in Amarillo, Texas on June 6, 1996.

== Personal life ==
Murdoch was the cousin of wrestler Killer Tim Brooks.

Murdoch appeared in four movies: The Wrestler (1974), Paradise Alley (1978), Grunt! The Wrestling Movie (1985), and Manhattan Merengue! (1995). He also appeared on an episode of Learning The Ropes and an episode of The Jerry Springer Show. Murdoch appeared in various rodeo events, ran his own bar, and did promotional work for Coors beer, as well as participating in drug awareness programs.

=== Accusations of racism and KKK affiliation ===
Over the years, several within professional wrestling who knew Murdoch have said he was racist and was a member of the Ku Klux Klan, including Bad News Brown, Tony Atlas and his tag team partner Dusty Rhodes. He claimed in his book that Murdoch told him "Let's go change bars", so they drove in a truck down the road near New Orleans; instead of a bar, Rhodes noticed that Murdoch had taken him to a KKK rally. In 2014, Rocky Johnson claimed Murdoch was a member of the Klan and that he once knocked him unconscious during a match stating during an interview, "Because he was KKK and didn't like blacks, he kept kicking me hard and punching me. I said, 'you hit me one more time, I'm hitting you back.' He hit me, and I knocked Murdoch out." Wrestling announcer Jim Ross, on his wrestling podcast "Grilling JR," said Murdoch once showed him his Ku Klux Klan membership card.

The claim of Murdoch being in the Klan has been disputed by Jim Cornette on his podcast, stating: "Murdoch was a redneck from West Texas. I'd be inclined to think he was probably not the most tolerant individual of anybody. But I spent a lot of time around him, and he never tried to recruit me to the Klan. I've seen him work with black guys as well as white guys, and not have any problems with any of them unless they had two left feet in the ring." Similarly, Chris Jericho said of Murdoch "As I got to know him I realized he wasn't a racist, he was just honest and fair. He hated everyone equally."

== Other media ==
Murdoch was featured as a playable character in the 2001 video game Fire Pro Wrestling and 2007 video game Wrestle Kingdom 2.

== Death ==
Murdoch died of a heart attack on June 15, 1996, at the age of 49, having taken part in a rodeo earlier that day. He was found dead at 4:30 AM on a couch in his living room by his ex-wife. Murdoch suffered from high blood pressure in later years and had no prior heart problems.

== Championships and accomplishments ==
- All Japan Pro Wrestling
  - NWA United National Championship (1 time)
- Central States Wrestling
  - NWA Central States Heavyweight Championship (3 times)
  - NWA Central States Tag Team Championship (1 time) – with Bob Brown
  - NWA North American Tag Team Championship (Central States version) (3 times) – with Dusty Rhodes (1) and Bob Sweetan (2)
  - NWA United States Heavyweight Championship ( Central States Version ) ( 3 times )
- Championship Wrestling from Florida
  - NWA Florida Tag Team Championship (2 times) – with Dusty Rhodes (1), Bobby Duncum (1)
  - NWA Southern Heavyweight Championship (Florida version) (1 time)
- Gulf Coast Championship Wrestling
  - NWA Gulf Coast Tag Team Championship (1 time) – with Don Carson
- Jim Crockett Promotions
  - NWA United States Tag Team Championship (1 time) – with Ivan Koloff
- NWA Big Time Wrestling
  - NWA American Tag Team Championship (1 time) – with Dusty Rhodes
- NWA Detroit
  - NWA World Tag Team Championship (Detroit version) (1 time) – with Dusty Rhodes
- NWA Mid-America
  - NWA World Tag Team Championship (Mid-America version) (1 time) – with Don Carson
- NWA Tri-State / Mid-South Wrestling Association
  - Mid-South North American Championship (2 times)
  - Mid-South Tag Team Championship (3 times) – with Junkyard Dog
  - NWA North American Heavyweight Championship (Tri-State version) (3 times)
  - NWA Tri-State Brass Knuckles Championship (1 time)
  - NWA United States Tag Team Championship (Tri-State version) (2 times) – with Killer Karl Kox (1) and Ted DiBiase (1)
- NWA Western States Sports
  - NWA Brass Knuckles Championship (Amarillo version) (3 times)
  - NWA International Heavyweight Championship (Amarillo version) (3 times)
  - NWA Western States Heavyweight Championship (1 time)
  - NWA Western States Tag Team Championship (3 times) – with Bobby Duncum (1) and Blackjack Mulligan (2)
- National Wrestling Federation
  - NWF World Tag Team Championship (1 time) – with Dusty Rhodes
- Professional Wrestling Hall of Fame
  - Class of 2013
- Pro Wrestling Illustrated
  - PWI Most Inspirational Wrestler of the Year (1974)
  - PWI ranked him #96 of the top 500 singles wrestlers of the "PWI Years" in 2003
- St. Louis Wrestling Club
  - NWA Missouri Heavyweight Championship (3 times)
- St. Louis Wrestling Hall of Fame
  - Class of 2010
- World Championship Wrestling (Australia)
  - IWA World Tag Team Championship (2 times) – with Lars Anderson (1), Dusty Rhodes (1)
- World Wrestling Council
  - WWC Universal Heavyweight Championship (1 time)
  - WWC World Television Championship (2 times)
- World Wrestling Federation
  - WWF Tag Team Championship (1 time) – with Adrian Adonis

== See also ==
- List of premature professional wrestling deaths
