= Wahoo McDaniel =

American football player and professional wrestler (1938–2002)

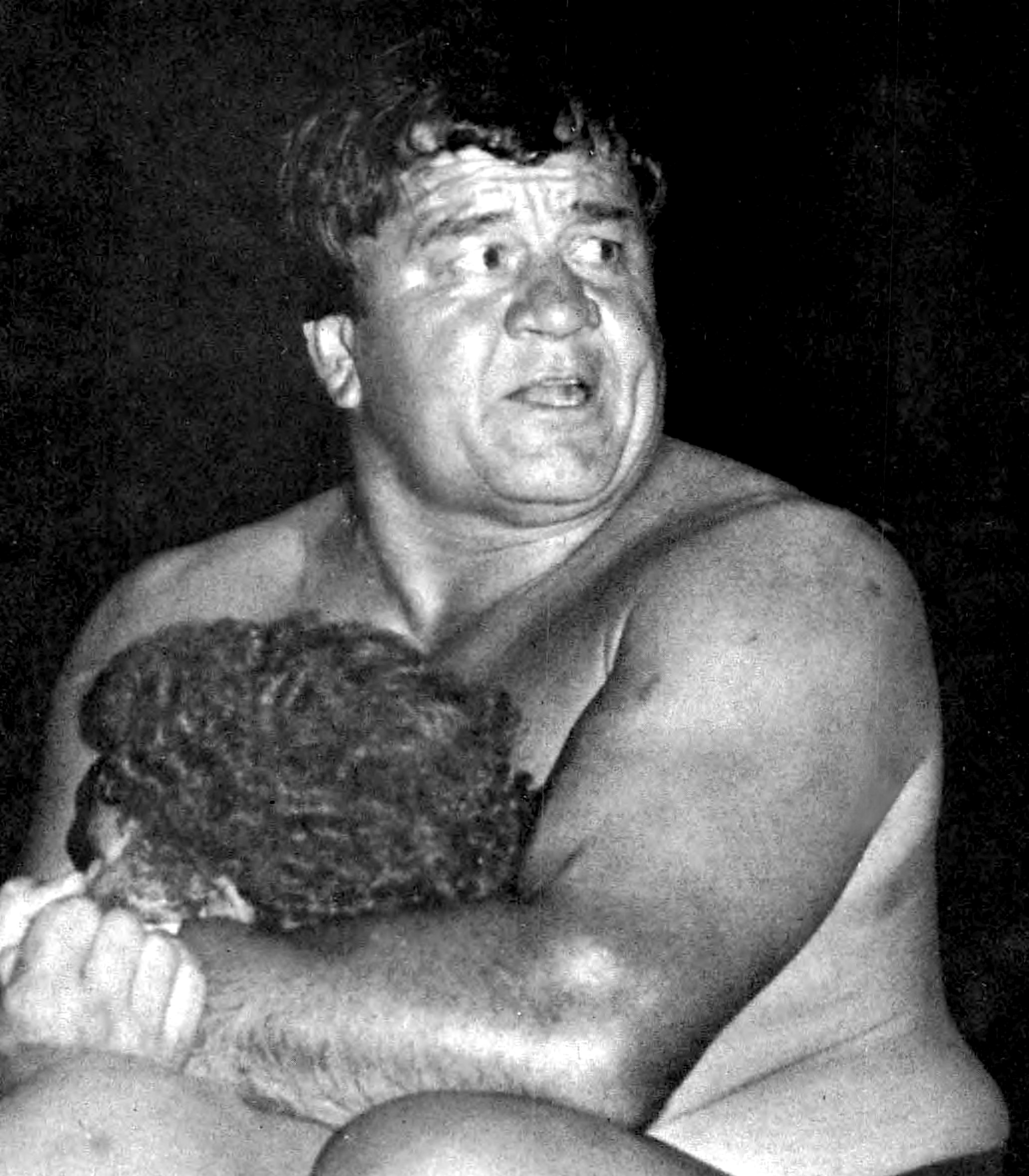
- McDaniel, circa 1979
- Born: Edward Hugh McDaniel; June 19, 1938; Bernice, Louisiana, U.S.
- Died: April 18, 2002 (aged 63); Houston, Texas, U.S.
- Education: University of Oklahoma
- Spouse: Monta Rae (divorced)
- Children: 2
- Professional wrestling career
- Ring name: Wahoo McDaniel
- Billed height: 6 ft 2 in (188 cm)
- Billed weight: 265 lb (120 kg)
- Billed from: Midland, Texas
- Trained by: Dory Funk
- Debut: 1961
- Retired: 1996
- Football career

No. 62, 54
- Position: Linebacker / Guard

Personal information
- Listed height: 6 ft 1 in (1.85 m)
- Listed weight: 235 lb (107 kg)

Career information
- High school: Midland
- College: Oklahoma
- AFL draft: 1960

Career history
- Houston Oilers (1960); Denver Broncos (1961–1963); New York Jets (1964–1965); Miami Dolphins (1966–1968)

Awards and highlights
- AFL champion (1960); Second-team All-Big Eight (1959)
- Stats at Pro Football Reference

Edward Hugh McDaniel (June 19, 1938 – April 18, 2002) was an American professional football player and professional wrestler better known by his ring name Wahoo McDaniel. He is notable for having held the NWA United States Heavyweight Championship five times. McDaniel was a major star in the American Wrestling Association and prominent National Wrestling Alliance affiliated promotions such as Championship Wrestling from Florida, Georgia Championship Wrestling, NWA Big Time Wrestling and, most notably, Jim Crockett Promotions.

McDaniel is often compared to his contemporary Chief Jay Strongbow, due to both portraying similar Native American gimmicks.

== Early life ==
McDaniel was born in the small town of Bernice, Louisiana, in 1938. His family was Choctaw-Chickasaw, and he was a member of the Choctaw Nation of Oklahoma. His father Hugh, worked in the oil industry and moved to several towns before settling down in Midland, Texas. He attended Midland High School, where he was a track state champion in the shot put and second in the state in the discus. One of his baseball coaches, particularly for his Pony League team, was George H. W. Bush. The name "Wahoo" actually came from his father, who was known as "Big Wahoo". Though he was a problematic teenager, he was recruited to the University of Oklahoma by Bud Wilkinson. While attending, he was a member of the Sigma Chi fraternity and also a part of Wilkinson's Sooners football program, where he holds the record for the longest punt at 91 yards.

== Professional football career ==
McDaniel began his career as a professional football player in 1960 in the American Football League (AFL), playing for the Houston Oilers during their inaugural AFL Championship-winning season. He then played for the Denver Broncos between 1961 and 1963. After he started playing as a linebacker for the New York Jets in 1964, McDaniel started wearing a custom jersey which had the name "Wahoo" sewn on the back above jersey 54, and whenever he made a tackle as a Jet, the public address announcer would ask the crowd WHO made that tackle, in which the crowd would shout, "Wahoo! Wahoo! Wahoo!" After two seasons with the Jets, McDaniel went to the Miami Dolphins in 1966, and played with this team until his retirement after the 1968 season.

== Professional wrestling career ==
While with the Houston Oilers, McDaniel also trained with NWA Amarillo wrestling promoter Dory Funk Sr. and became a professional wrestler as a way to supplement his income by the time he was traded to the Denver Broncos in 1961. After he was traded to the New York Jets in 1964, McDaniel began wrestling for Vincent J. McMahon's World Wide Wrestling Federation (WWWF). The promoter wanted him to play off his Native American heritage, thus he was given the moniker "Chief" Wahoo McDaniel. After he was traded to the Miami Dolphins in 1966, McDaniel began wrestling for Eddie Graham's Championship Wrestling from Florida (CWF). When his football career ended in 1969, McDaniel became a full-time wrestler; in his first year, McDaniel became involved in NWA Texas and won the NWA Texas Heavyweight Championship.

While wrestling in the American Wrestling Association (AWA), McDaniel engaged in a feud with Superstar Billy Graham. Along with Johnny Valentine, Superstar Billy Graham was regarded as one of McDaniel's earliest and bitter rivals. Between 1973 and 1974, McDaniel and Superstar would engage in numerous wrestling bouts in what was considered one of the AWA's top-drawing feuds of the 1970s. Some of these bouts included Indian Strap Matches and also tag team matches which pitted McDaniel and The Crusher against Superstar and Ivan Koloff. In 1974, McDaniel came to Mid-Atlantic to wrestle for Jim Crockett Promotions and help build up the territory as a singles territory in a feud with a rival from Texas, Johnny Valentine. The feud evolved into a tag feud with McDaniel and Paul Jones taking on Valentine and Ric Flair, who McDaniel met in the AWA.

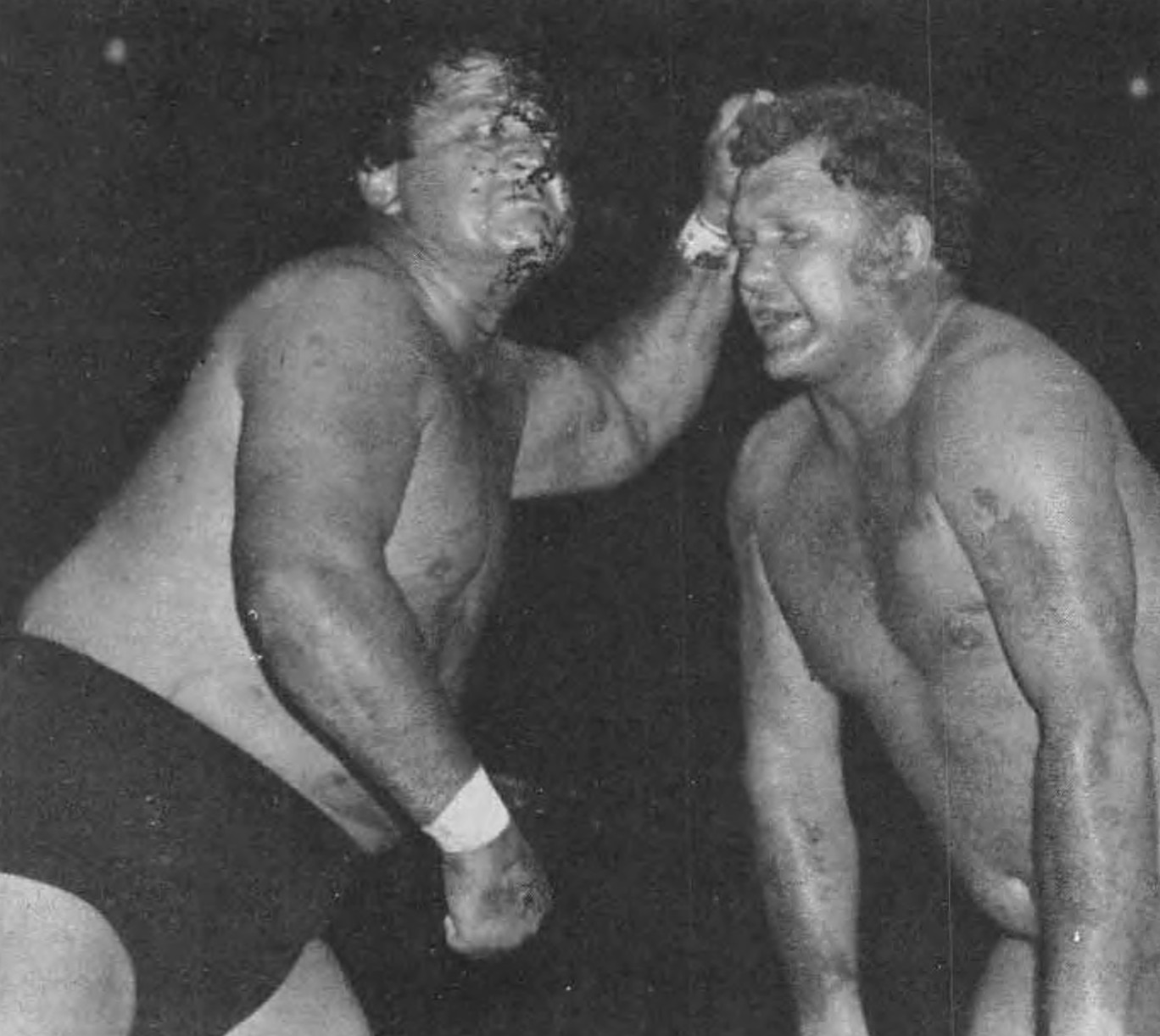
Wahoo McDaniel (left) vs Harley Race (right), circa 1970s

McDaniel and Valentine had a historical feud remembered for the sheer force of their punch/chop exchanges, both men widely known for their hard-hitting style. On June 29, 1975, McDaniel won the NWA Mid-Atlantic Heavyweight Championship by defeating Valentine. In 1977, Johnny Valentine's son Greg Valentine attacked McDaniel and broke his leg in an angle to establish Greg as Johnny's successor. Valentine originally won the title on June 11, 1977, with McDaniel regaining it two months later. On September 7, 1977, Valentine regained the title at the WRAL-TV studio tapings, breaking McDaniel's leg in the process. This angle is particularly remembered for a follow-up interview weeks later with Flair and Valentine throwing change at McDaniel, and Valentine asking him if he needed a custom-made wheelchair for his fat body. Valentine then infuriated fans (thus building up the demand for a rematch) by parading around in T-shirts which read "I Broke Wahoo's Leg" and "No More Wahoo."

McDaniel also worked for World Championship Wrestling's Slamboree 1993: A Legends' Reunion pay-per-view on May 23, 1993, where he teamed with Blackjack Mulligan and Jim Brunzell and fought Dick Murdoch, Don Muraco and Jimmy Snuka to a no-contest. At Slamboree on May 23, 1995, he defeated Murdoch. He also worked in independent shows until retiring in 1996. His last match was teaming with his son Ricky as they defeated Desperado and Jake Mulligan at Southern Championship Wrestling in Clinton, South Carolina on Independence Day 1996.

== Personal life ==
McDaniel was married three times. With his first wife, Monta Rae, he had his only children, two daughters, Nikki Rowe, born in June 1963 in Midland, Texas and living in Houston and Cindi Blank, born in October 1965 in Queens, New York and living in Azle, Texas. He also has four grandchildren, from Nikki Rowe (Dustin and Brittany) and from Cindi Blank (twins Morgan and Taylor as well as four great-grandchildren. Dustin has (Vayda and Bo Wayne), Morgan (Monroe) and Taylor (Rory). He was also an avid golfer and hunter.

McDaniel's health started to deteriorate in the mid-1990s, which led to his retirement in 1996, and he eventually lost both kidneys in 2000. He was awaiting a kidney transplant when he suffered a stroke and died of complications from diabetes and kidney failure while living with his daughter Nikki in Houston, Texas on April 18, 2002. His body was cremated and his ashes are with his daughter Nikki in Houston.

== Championships and accomplishments ==
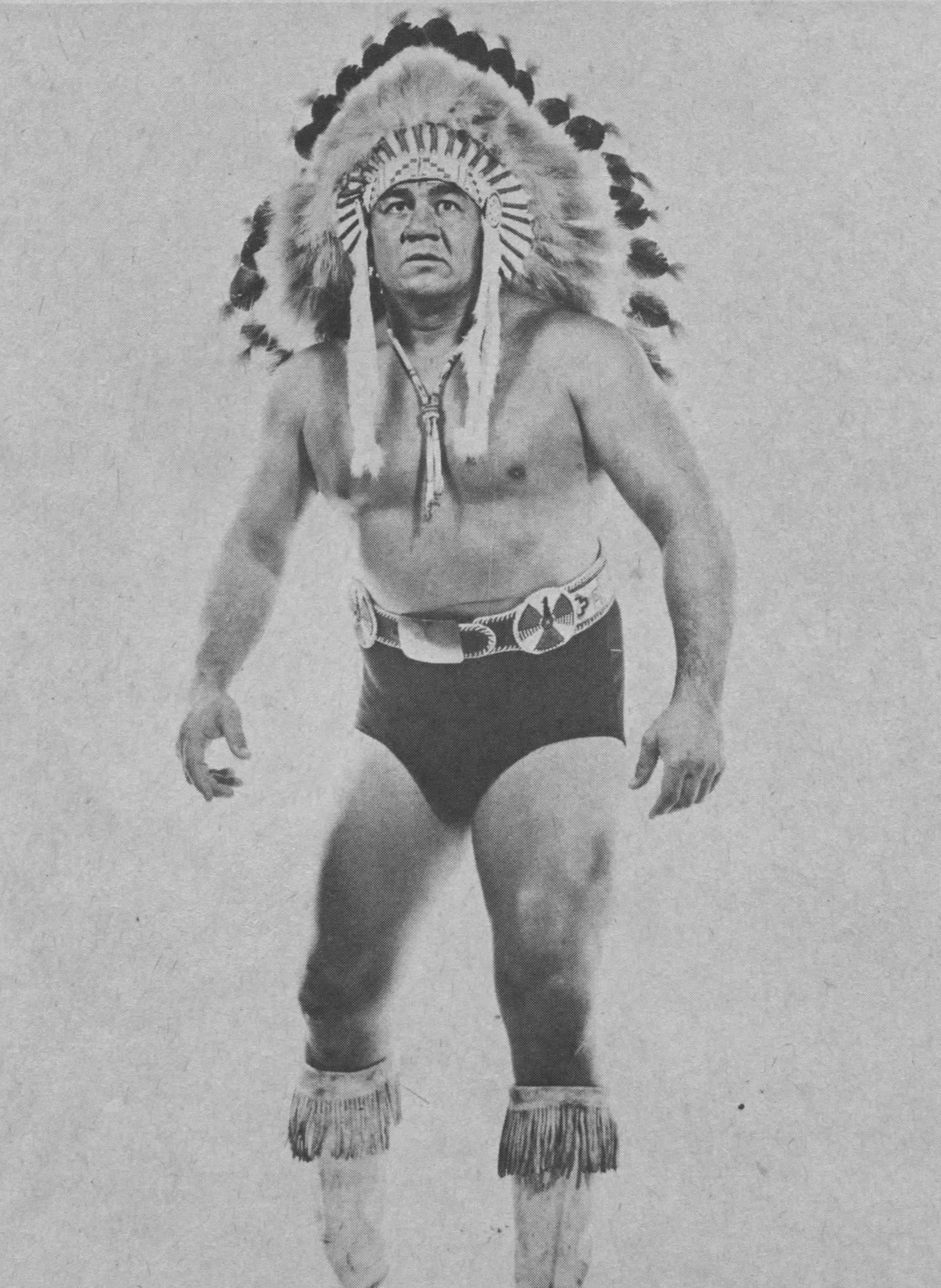
Wahoo McDaniel c. 1973

- American Championship Wrestling
  - ACW World Heavyweight Championship (1 time)
  - ACW United States Championship (1 time)
- American Wrestling Association
  - AWA World Tag Team Championship (1 time) - with Crusher Lisowski (1 time)
- Cauliflower Alley Club
  - Other honoree (1996)
- Championship Wrestling from Florida
  - NWA Florida Heavyweight Championship (1 time)
  - NWA Florida Television Championship (1 time)
  - NWA Southern Heavyweight Championship (Florida version) (2 times)
  - NWA United States Tag Team Championship (Florida version) (1 time) – with Billy Jack Haynes
  - NWA World Tag Team Championship (Florida version) (2 times) – with Jose Lothario
- Georgia Championship Wrestling
  - NWA Georgia Heavyweight Championship (2 times)
  - NWA Georgia Tag Team Championship (1 time) – with Tommy Rich
  - NWA Macon Heavyweight Championship (1 time)
- International Pro Wrestling
  - IWA World Heavyweight Championship (1 time)
- Mid-Atlantic Championship Wrestling / Jim Crockett Promotions / World Championship Wrestling
  - NWA Mid-Atlantic Heavyweight Championship (7 times)
  - NWA National Heavyweight Championship (1 time)
  - NWA United States Heavyweight Championship (5 times)

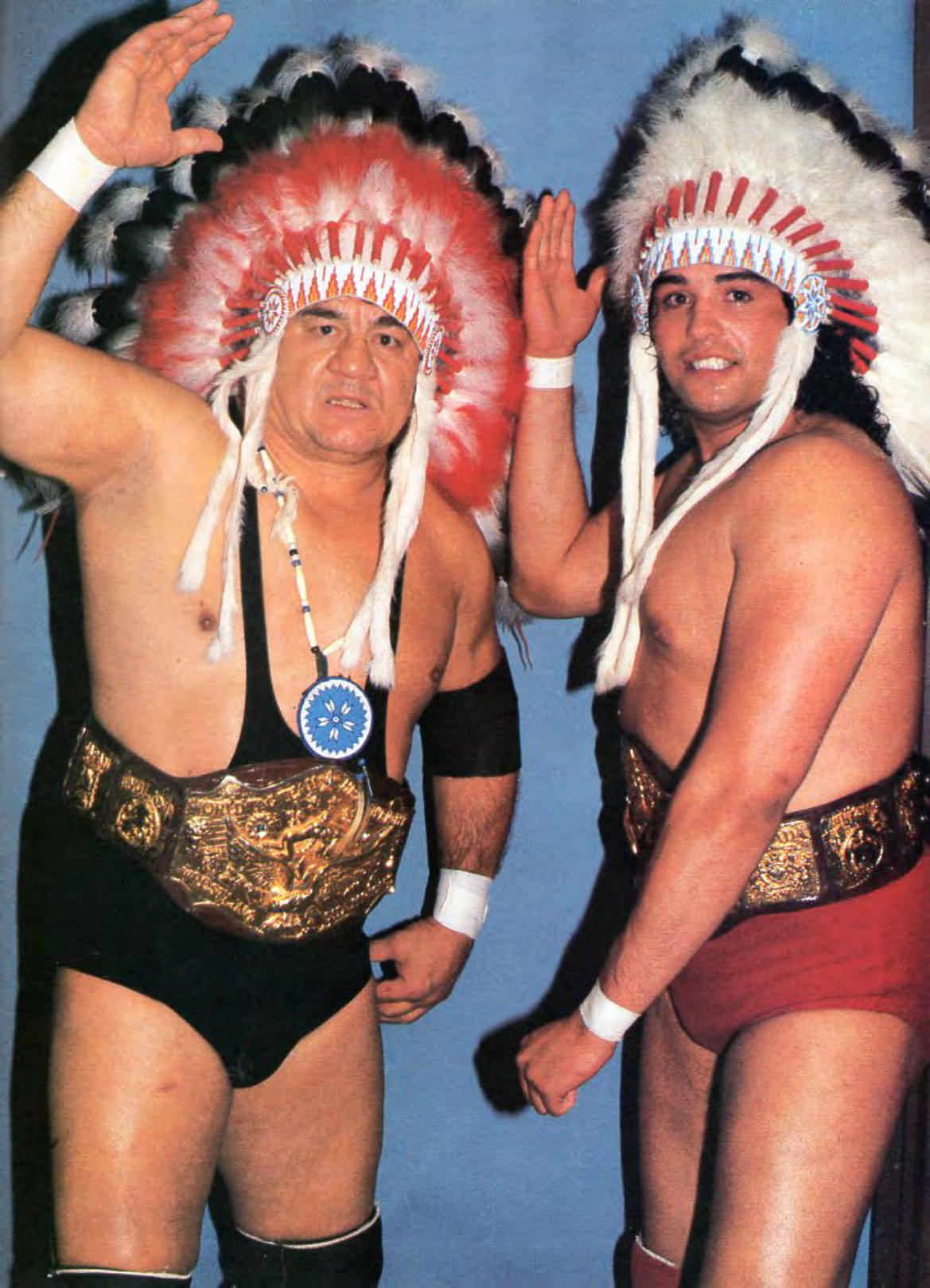
McDaniel (left) and Mark Youngblood (right) as NWA Tag Team Champions, circa 1984

  - NWA World Tag Team Championship (Mid-Atlantic version) (4 times) – with Mark Youngblood (2), Rufus R. Jones (1), and Paul Jones (1)
  - WCW Hall of Fame (Class of 1995)
  - Cadillac Cup (1976)
  - NWA United States Championship Tournament (1984)
- Mid-Atlantic Wrestling Alliance
  - MAWA Heavyweight Championship (1 time)
- National Wrestling Federation
  - NWF World Tag Team Championship (1 time) – with Chief White Owl
- National Wrestling Alliance
  - NWA Hall of Fame (Class of 2011)
- NWA Big Time Wrestling
  - NWA American Heavyweight Championship (2 times)
  - NWA American Tag Team Championship (3 times) – with Johnny Valentine (2), and Thunderbolt Paterson(1)
  - NWA Texas Heavyweight Championship (2 times)
  - NWA Texas Tag Team Championship (1 time) – with Tony Parisi
- North American Wrestling Alliance
  - NAWA Heavyweight Championship (2 times)
- Professional Wrestling Hall of Fame and Museum
  - Class of 2010
- Pro Wrestling Illustrated
  - PWI Most Popular Wrestler of the Year (1976)
  - PWI ranked him # 97 of the 500 best singles wrestlers during the "PWI Years" in 2003
- Southern Championship Wrestling
  - SCW Hall of Fame (Class of 1998)
- Southern States Wrestling
  - Kingsport Wrestling Hall of Fame (Class of 2000)
- Southwest Championship Wrestling
  - SCW Southwest Heavyweight Championship (2 times)
  - SCW Southwest Tag Team Championship (1 time) – with Terry Funk
  - SCW World Tag Team Championship (1 time) – with Ivan Putski
- Ultimate Championship Wrestling
  - UCW Heavyweight Championship (1 time)
- WWE
  - WWE Hall of Fame (Class of 2019)
- Wrestling Observer Newsletter
  - Wrestling Observer Newsletter Hall of Fame (Class of 2002)

== See also ==
- Other American Football League players
- List of gridiron football players who became professional wrestlers
