= Bart Sawyer =

American professional wrestler (1965–2023)

Personal information
- Born: Steven Stewart; November 30, 1965 Kansas City, Missouri, U.S.
- Died: September 12, 2023 (aged 57)

Professional wrestling career
- Ring name(s): Bart Sawyer; Steve Sawyer
- Billed height: 5 ft 9 in (1.75 m)
- Billed weight: 225 lb (102 kg)
- Billed from: Portland, Oregon; Kansas City, Missouri
- Trained by: Bob Geigel
- Debut: April 22, 1988
- Retired: 2004

Steven Stewart (November 30, 1965 – September 12, 2023), known by his ring name Bart Sawyer, was an American professional wrestler, color commentator, and occasional actor. He was best known for his time in Championship Wrestling USA and the United States Wrestling Association during the 1990s. In his career, Sawyer also wrestled for Extreme Canadian Championship Wrestling, House of Pain Wrestling Federation, Memphis Wrestling, NWA Georgia, NWA Main Event, NWA Worldwide, World Xtreme Wrestling and W*ING. Additionally, he competed as a preliminary wrestler in World Championship Wrestling and the World Wrestling Federation.

Trained by Bob Geigel, Stewart began his professional wrestling career in the World Wrestling Alliance. He emerged as a popular "fan favorite" in Pacific Northwest Wrestling in the early-1990s, whose gimmick was modeled after Bart Simpson, and engaged in feuds with Al Madril, Colonel DeBeers, Matt Borne and Buddy Wayne. Sawyer later became a "rulebreaker" himself when he relocated to the Southern United States. Throughout his career, Sawyer won several championships including the Championship Wrestling USA Television Championship four times, the NWA Georgia Heavyweight Championship once, the NWA North American Tag Team Championship (with Chris Michaels), and the USWA World Tag Team Championship (with Doug Masters and Flex Kavana) three times. He was forced to retire in 2004, following a mild stroke, after nearly 18 years in the ring.

== Professional wrestling career ==
=== Early career (1987–1989) ===
Stewart trained under Bob Geigel at Memorial Hall in Kansas City, Missouri. The first wrestler he ever faced as a student was Curtis Hughes. Stewart made his pro debut as "Steve Sawyer" on April 22, 1988. He initially wrestled for Geigel's World Wrestling Alliance in Kansas City, Missouri. After the WWA's close, Stewart made brief appearances for the United States Wrestling Association and World Class Championship Wrestling.

=== Pacific Northwest Wrestling (1990–1991) ===
Stewart joined Pacific Northwest Wrestling in the fall of 1990, as Bart Sawyer, a hyperactive and mischievous young wrestler. The character was modeled after Bart Simpson from the American animated series The Simpsons. Sawyer's nickname (The Bartman) derived from the 1990 parody song: "Do the Bartman". He also cut his hair so as to more closely resemble the cartoon character. Stewart scored wins over Brad Anderson and Ricky Santana during his first year in the promotion and became a popular "fan favorite" feuding with Al Madril. On October 20, 1990, Stewart won a $5,000 Battle Royal at the Portland Sports Arena. A match with Steve Doll against Anderson and The Hood for the NWA Pacific Northwest Tag Team Championship ended in a no-contest and the title was declared held-up. Sawyer and Doll were defeated by Anderson and The Hood in Portland on February 16, 1991, however, The Hood was unmasked as Ricky Santana.

=== United States Wrestling Association (1991–1992) ===
Later that year, Stewart traveled across the country to the United States Wrestling Association in Memphis, Tennessee. He formed a partnership with Doug Masters and the two quickly climbed the ranks of the tag team division. On November 4, 1991, they defeated Robert Fuller and Jeff Jarrett for the USWA World Tag Team Championship. Stewart and Masters' championship reign was short-lived, however, as they lost the belts to Fuller and Mike Mitchell weeks later. The two men soon had a falling out and were feuding by early 1992. On January 13, Sawyer and Masters battled to a double-disqualification in a lumberjack strap match. The following week, Sawyer unsuccessfully challenged Eric Embry for the USWA Southern Heavyweight Championship. On the same event, Sawyer took part in an 8-man "strap battle royal" which was also won by Embry and included Tony Falk, Tom Pritchard, CJ, Miss Texas, Tony Anthony, and Doug Masters. On February 2, Sawyer and Tony Williams lost to Masters and Brian Christopher at the Mid-South Coliseum.

=== Championship Wrestling USA (1992) ===
On August 22, 1992, Sawyer defeated Ron Harris in a tournament final to win the Championship Wrestling USA Television Championship. His first reign as champion lasted nearly two months before losing the title to Mike Winner on October 10, 1992.

=== United States Wrestling Association (1992) ===
That fall, Sawyer returned to the USWA and won victories against Randy Rhodes and Mike Miller at the Mid-South Coliseum. His winning streak was stopped by Jeff Gaylord on November 9, 1992. The next week, Sawyer and Miss Texas beat Mike Miller and Lauren Davenport in a mixed tag team match.

=== Championship Wrestling USA (1993) ===
On January 9, 1993, Sawyer defeated John Rambo to win the Championship Wrestling USA Television Championship. He feuded with Colonel DeBeers over the title before finally dropping the belt to DeBeers on February 27, 1993. Later that year, Sawyer made a one-time appearance in World Championship Wrestling facing off against Maxx Payne on WCW Main Event.

=== W*ING (1993–1994) ===
Between 1993 and 1994, Stewart made several trips to Japan appearing for W*ING. On May 27, 1993, he and Killer Kyle wrestled Mitsuhiro Matsunaga and Shoji Nakamaki at W*ING Dog in the Box. On June 18, 1993, he faced Mr. Pogo in a Scramble Bunkhouse Death match at Korakuen Hall. On February 11, 1994, Stewart wrestled Kazumi Masasaki in a Falls Count Anywhere match. Four days later, he battled Jason the Terrible in a Barbedwire Baseball match.

=== Independent circuit (1994–1995) ===
Sawyer also made a brief stop in the USWA, with wins over Tony Falk, Reggie B. Fine and Leon Downs, before moving back to the Pacific Northwest. In the spring of 1995, Sawyer joined Richard Small's short-lived Pacific Coast Wrestling promotion. On March 4, 1995, Sawyer and Bruiser Brian Cox defeated Buddy Wayne and Lou Andrews in Portland to become the inaugural tag team champions.

=== World Championship Wrestling (1995–1996) ===
In early 1995, Stewart started working for World Championship Wrestling as a preliminary wrestler. Stewart made his first WCW television appearance on the May 13th edition of WCW Worldwide where he wrestled Arn Anderson (with Ric Flair) for the WCW Television Championship. A semi-regular on WCW Worldwide and WCW Saturday Night, subsequent opponents included Diamond Dallas Page, Disco Inferno, Lex Luger, One Man Gang, Shinjiro Otani, and V.K. Wallstreet. He also faced The Blue Bloods (with T.A. McCoy and Leroy Howard), Harlem Heat (with Ron Thompson), and The Stud Stable (with Bobby Walker). On the January 13, 1996 episode of WCW Pro, Sawyer and Buck Quartermaine were defeated by Chris Benoit and Brian Pillman. Sawyer's team lost when his partner was pinned by Benoit following a dropkick / dragon suplex combination. The following night on WCW Worldwide, he wrestled Kensuke Sasaki for the WCW United States Heavyweight Championship. Despite a strong showing, Sawyer lost via submission with a standing armbar. Sawyer made his final WCW appearance on the May 12th episode of WCW Worldwide where he and Manny Fernandez lost to Men At Work (Mark Starr and Chris Kanyon).

=== Championship Wrestling USA (1996) ===
After his run in WCW, Sawyer briefly returned to Championship Wrestling USA. On February 18, 1996, Sawyer and Sumito wrestled Buddy Wayne and Colonel DeBeers in Vancouver, Washington. During the match, Wayne accidentally pinned DeBeers, then Championship Wrestling USA Television Champion, and was awarded his partner's title. He also began making regular appearances for Extreme Canadian Championship Wrestling in neighboring British Columbia. A protege and longtime friend of Roddy Piper, Sawyer adopted a similar "bad boy" persona during this period. He appeared in two films starring Piper, Masked Man (1996) and Sea of Fire (1996), as well as a fight choreographer. Sawyer used the Highland Sleeper finisher as a tribute to Piper.

=== United States Wrestling Association (1996) ===
After a two-year absence, Sawyer made his return to the United States Wrestling Association. The USWA had a talent sharing agreement with the World Wrestling Federation at this time. On March 10, 1996, Sawyer defeated The Brooklyn Brawler in a dark match on WWF Superstars. On June 15, Sawyer lost to Brickhouse Brown in a match for the USWA Television Championship. Two days later, Sawyer won the then vacant USWA World Tag Team Championship with Flex Kavana after defeating Brickhouse Brown and Reggie B. Fine in a tournament final. The team also wrestled the opening match at the last-ever event held at the historic Mid-South Coliseum. The team Sawyer and Kavana were then involved in a feud with Jerry Lawler and Bill Dundee. They lost the title to Lawler and Dundee on July 1 but regained them the following week. Kavana put up his hair for the team to receive a rematch. The team's second and final title reign ended a week later when Sawyer and Kavana dropped the belts to Brickhouse Brown and Reggie B. Fine on July 15, 1996.

=== Return to the Pacific Northwest (1996–1997) ===
Sawyer went back to Championship Wrestling USA at the end of the year. On December 15, 1996, he defeated Buddy Wayne to win the Championship Wrestling USA Television Championship a record fourth time. Sawyer's reign was brief, however, as he quickly lost the belt back to Wayne the following week. On April 13, 1997, Sawyer took part in a 10-man steel cage match for the Championship Wrestling USA Heavyweight Championship. The title was thrown into the ring and the wrestler who managed to escape the cage with the belt would be declared the new champion. Sawyer was the only wrestler to climb to the top of the cage with the championship but threw it down to Matt Borne who was waiting outside. He remained in the area wrestling on the local independent circuit for another year. In late 1997, Sawyer worked for Ivan and Jeff Kafoury's Portland Wrestling. On November 1, 1997, Sawyer defeated Matt Borne to win the promotion's then vacant heavyweight championship.

=== Independent circuit (1998) ===
With few options in Portland, Sawyer traveled to the Mid-Atlantic United States. On July 12, 1998, Sawyer teamed with Blackhawk, John Rambo, and Doink the Clown to defeat The Grungers (Skagnetti and Skank) and The Bad Crew (Bad Crew #1 and Bad Crew #2) for World Xtreme Wrestling's Sportsfest '98 supercard in Allentown, Pennsylvania. On July 18, 1998, Sawyer defeated Gutterboy in Hagerstown, Maryland for the vacant HoPWF Heavyweight Championship.

=== National Wrestling Alliance (1999–2001) ===
By 1999, Sawyer had found success with the National Wrestling Alliance-affiliated promotions in the Southern United States specifically NWA Georgia, NWA Main Event and NWA Worldwide. Soon after entering NWA Worldwide, Sawyer began feuding with fellow USWA alumni Brickhouse Brown. In early 1999, Sawyer feuded with The Colorado Kid over the NWA North American Heavyweight Championship. At one point, Sawyer stole the title, after knocking out The Colorado Kid with a steel chair, and made title defences as the self-proclaimed champion. After one of their bouts, Sawyer assaulted referee Jimmy Rivers blaming the official for his recent loss. This incident led to a bout between Sawyer and The Colorado Kid at the Nashville Fairgrounds on March 20, 1999, with Eddie Marlin as special guest referee.

In May 1999, Sawyer entered a championship tournament for the NWA Georgia Junior Heavyweight Championship after the NWA decided to revive the long abandoned title. He defeated but lost to Air Paris in the finals. On June 27, 1999, Sawyer defeated Silky Boom Boom in Stockbridge, Georgia to win the NWA Georgia Heavyweight Championship. A week later, he teamed with Chris Michaels to win the NWA North American Tag Team Championship from Frenchy Riviera and Shane Eden in Nashville, Tennessee. On August 19, Sawyer and Terry Lawler challenged Shane Young and David Young for the NWA Georgia Tag Team Championship in Loganville, Georgia but were unsuccessful. The NWA North American Tag Team Championship was declared vacant that same month, when the team failed to defend the title within 30 days, and Sawyer was stripped of the NWA Georgia Heavyweight Championship in October 1999.

Although Sawyer was based in Nashville's NWA Main Event by 2000, he continued wrestling throughout the United States. Around this time he was publicly challenged by NWA ECCW's Michelle Starr. In September 2000, the two men were scheduled to wrestle in a tag team match at the Roseland Theater against Bruiser Brian Cox and a mystery partner later revealed to be Tony Anthony. When neither of their opponents were able to appear, the two men began fighting each other. On February 9, 2001, Sawyer was in attendance at the 35th annual Cauliflower Alley Club reunion in Las Vegas with Roddy Piper as one of his bodyguards. On November 3, 2001, Sawyer was the last man eliminated by Kevin White in a 10-man battle royal to crown the first NWA-USA Main Event United States Heavyweight Champion.

=== Later career and retirement (2002–2004) ===
On October 12, 2002, Sawyer wrestled HoPWF Cruiserweight Champion Fumar in Martinsburg, West Virginia as part of a four-way match also including Hyjinx and Aidean. On February 14, 2003, Sawyer defeated masked wrestler Parts Unknown (Larry Huntley) and Robbie Ellis at a Maine Event Wrestling show in Norway, Maine, as part of a television taping for the promotion's weekly Midnight Madness TV series. He also worked for Coliseum Championship Wrestling in Evansville, Indiana, twice winning the CCW Heavyweight Championship, and served on its booking committee. That same year, Sawyer retired as an active competitor for Bert Prentice's USA Championship Wrestling in favor of becoming a color commentator for its weekly TV show.

On February 4, 2004, Sawyer teamed with Big Bully Douglas against Shane Douglas and Michael Shane at the Nashville Fairgrounds for a NWA: Total Nonstop Action weekly pay-per-view event. A few weeks later, Sawyer was part of a Memphis Wrestling tournament to crown the first Memphis Wrestling Southern Heavyweight Champion. Sawyer defeated Bad Boy #2 in the opening round but was replaced by Bill Dundee who ended up facing Mabel in the tournament final. Sawyer made a second NWA: TNA pay-per-view appearance on June 9, 2004, when he and Shane Matthews took on Monty Brown and Abyss.

Stewart suffered a mild stroke on November 22, 2004. He remained in a coma for several days as well as suffering paralysis in the left side of his body. Doctors in Nashville subsequently discovered a blood clot in Sawyer's right arm that required surgery. Although Sawyer recovered, he was forced into retirement.

== Filmography ==
List of appearances in film
Year	Title	Role	Notes	Ref.
1996	Marked Man			
1996	Sea of Fire			

== Championships and accomplishments ==
- Championship Wrestling USA
  - Championship Wrestling USA Television Championship (4 times)
- Coliseum Championship Wrestling
  - CCW Heavyweight Championship (2 times)
- House of Pain Wrestling Federation
  - HoPWF Heavyweight Championship (1 time)
- National Wrestling Alliance
  - NWA North American Tag Team Championship (1 time) – with Chris Michaels
- NWA Georgia
  - NWA Georgia Heavyweight Championship (1 time)
- Pacific Coast Wrestling
  - PCW Tag Team Championship (1 time) – with Rage Man
- Portland Wrestling
  - Portland Pacific Northwest Championship (1 time)
- Pro Wrestling Illustrated
  - PWI ranked him # 148 of the 500 best singles wrestlers in the PWI 500 in 1996
- Ring Around The Northwest Newsletter
  - Wrestler of the Year (1992, 1997)
- United States Wrestling Association
  - USWA World Tag Team Championship (3 times) – with Doug Masters (1) and Flex Kavana (2)
