= PNW 60th Anniversary Wrestling Extravaganza =

60th Anniversary Wrestling Extravaganza
- Promotion: Pacific Northwest Wrestling
- Date: May 21, 1985
- City: Portland, Oregon
- Venue: Portland Memorial Coliseum
- Attendance: 13,000

Wrestling Extravaganza chronology
← Previous; First	Next → Owen Family Super Extravaganza

The 60th Anniversary Wrestling Extravaganza was the first Wrestling Extravaganza supercard event, produced by Pacific Northwest Wrestling (PNW). It took place on May 21, 1985 at the Portland's Memorial Coliseum.

Don Owen was the National Wrestling Alliance (NWA) promoter for PNW, having in 1942 taken over the family business his father started in 1925. In honor of the Owen family's 60 years of promoting wrestling in the Northwest, they promoted the 60th Anniversary Wrestling Extravaganza.

This event took place just less than two months after the first WrestleMania. While this card didn't draw the media attention that WrestleMania did, this event was notable in many ways. The card was unique in that it featured active stars from each of the three major promotions in the United States at that time, American Wrestling Association (AWA), NWA and the World Wrestling Federation (WWF). In addition to having the AWA World Heavyweight Champion Rick Martel, AWA World Tag Team Champions The Road Warriors and the NWA World Heavyweight Champion Ric Flair on the card, it featured two wrestlers from the WWF who had just recently competed (against other competitors) in the WWF's first WrestleMania; they were the WWF's most prominent heel, "Rowdy" Roddy Piper (who established himself in PNW and was one of the territory's most popular stars while he competed there) and "Playboy" Buddy Rose (who wrestled in WrestleMania as the masked Executioner).

Ten professional wrestling matches were contested at the event and five matches were televised. In the main event, Ric Flair retained the NWA World Heavyweight Championship against Billy Jack Haynes via a time limit draw. In other televised matches, The Road Warriors retained the AWA World Tag Team Champions against Curt Hennig and Larry Hennig, Rick Martel defeated Mike Miller to retain the AWA World Heavyweight Championship, Roddy Piper defeated Buddy Rose, and Sgt. Slaughter defeated Kendo Nagasaki.

== Event ==
=== Preliminary matches ===
The first match in the televised segment saw Roddy Piper take on Buddy Rose. Piper countered a superplex attempt by Rose into a diving crossbody for the win.

In the next televised match, Sgt. Slaughter took on Kendo Nagasaki. Mega Maharishi tried to interfere in the match on Nagasaki's behalf as he attempted to hit Slaughter with a kendo stick but Slaughter avoided the assault and Nagasaki was accidentally hit with the stick. It allowed Slaughter to deliver a lariat to Nagasaki for the win.

Next, The Road Warriors (Animal and Hawk) defended the AWA World Tag Team Championship against Curt Hennig and Larry Hennig. Road Warriors' manager Paul Ellering interfered in the match and attacked Curt while he was gaining advantage in the match. Ellering and Road Warriors triple teamed Curt and Larry until Billy Jack Haynes made the save.

It was followed by the penultimate match, in which Rick Martel defended the AWA World Heavyweight Championship against the Pacific Northwest Heavyweight Champion Mike Miller. Martel pinned Miller with a small package to retain the title.

=== Main event match ===
Ric Flair defended the NWA World Heavyweight Championship against Billy Jack Haynes in the main event. Haynes applied a full nelson on Flair near the end of the match but the forty-minute time limit expired and the match ended in a draw. As a result, Flair retained the title.

== Reception ==
60th Anniversary Wrestling Extravaganza was the biggest supercard in the history of PNW. It drew a massive crowd, setting the record for the largest crowd in the company history. Reports vary on the attendance numbers from 12,000 to 13,000.

It received positive reviews from Matt Adamson of 411Mania, who rated the event 7. He praised the event for its "historical significance" as the event marked "the cooperation between the three biggest pro wrestling companies in America (AWA, NWA, and WWF)" the very last time. He felt that the NWA World Heavyweight Championship main event between Flair and Haynes was a "really good match" and also praised the "last of the classic Rose vs. Piper feud". According to him, rest of the matches at the event were "old school spectacle".

== Aftermath ==
Ric Flair and Billy Jack Haynes competed in a rematch for the NWA World Heavyweight Championship at a PNW event at the Seattle Center Coliseum on September 23. The match ended in a draw, which meant that Flair retained the title.

Steve Simpson and Karl Steiner continued their rivalry after the event, as Steiner defeated Simpson in many singles matches throughout the year. The two would also compete in opposing teams in tag team matches. On June 8, Steiner and Mike Miller defeated Simpson and Billy Two Eagles in the quarter-final round of a tournament for the vacant Pacific Northwest Tag Team Championship. Steiner and Miller won the tournament and Simpson eventually formed The S And S Express with Joe Savoldi. S And S Express feuded with Steiner and Miller over the titles, eventually beating them to win the Pacific Northwest Tag Team Championship at Owen Family Super Extravaganza.

Sgt. Slaughter and Kendo Nagasaki competed in a rematch on May 22, which Slaughter won again.

== Results ==
No.	Results	Stipulations	Times
1^{D}	Bobby Jaggers and Ricky Vaughn defeated Chris Colt and Tim Flowers	Tag team match	9:04
2^{D}	Mega Maharishi defeated Billy Two Eagles	Singles match	4:50
3^{D}	Karl Steiner defeated Steve Simpson	Singles match	10:06
4^{D}	Jerry Grey vs. Rocky Ventura ended in a time limit draw	Singles match	10:00
5^{D}	Cowboy Lang defeated Little Tokyo	Singles match	—
6	Sgt. Slaughter defeated Kendo Nagasaki	Singles match	10:54
7	Roddy Piper defeated Buddy Rose	Singles match	9:39
8	Curt Hennig and Larry Hennig defeated The Road Warriors (Animal and Hawk) (c) (with Paul Ellering) by disqualification	Tag team match for the AWA World Tag Team Championship	14:49
9	Rick Martel (c) defeated Mike Miller	Singles match for the AWA World Heavyweight Championship	12:24
10	Ric Flair (c) vs. Billy Jack Haynes ended in a time limit draw	Singles match for the NWA World Heavyweight Championship	45:00
(c) / – the champion(s) heading into the match; D / – this was a dark match

== See also ==
- 1985 in professional wrestling
