= Brickhouse Brown =

American professional wrestler (1960–2018)

Personal information
- Born: Frederick Seawright; August 11, 1960 Wilmington, Delaware, U.S.
- Died: July 29, 2018 (aged 57) Jackson, Mississippi, U.S.

Professional wrestling career
- Ring name(s): The Black Prince; Brickhouse Brown; M.C. Slammer; TheBreakdancer
- Billed height: 5 ft 8 in (1.73 m)
- Billed weight: 242 lb (110 kg; 17.3 st)
- Trained by: Eddie Graham; Terry Funk
- Debut: 1982
- Retired: 2017

Frederick Seawright (August 11, 1960 – July 29, 2018) was an American professional wrestler, better known by his ring name Brickhouse Brown. He was a top heel in several Southern promotions in the 1980s and 1990s.

== Professional wrestling career ==
=== Early career (1982–1987) ===
Brown's first matches in professional wrestling were for Southwest Championship Wrestling, under Joe Blanchard in San Antonio, Texas. He had no training prior to his first match in 1982 against Bobby Jaggers, but was later trained by Terry Funk. In 1983, he joined the National Wrestling Alliance, and for the next four years, he competed in various territories, especially within the Southeast. In September 1985, he won the NWA Southeastern Tag Team Championship with Norvell Austin, defeating The Nightmares. They lost the title back to The Nightmares a week later. In the summer of 1986, Brown worked for World Wrestling Federation where he scored upset victories over Moondog Rex and Tiger Chung Lee. He would lose to The Iron Sheik, Bob Orton Jr, Harley Race and Hercules Hernandez.

=== Prime career (1987–1997) ===
In March 1987, Brown went to Memphis to wrestle for Championship Wrestling Association. In July 1987, he won his first singles title, the AWA Southern Heavyweight Championship, defeating Jerry Lawler. He lost the title back to him a week later. In May 1988, he defeated Maxx Payne to win the CWA Heavyweight Championship. He held this top title for nearly two months, before losing it to Phil Hickerson. In August 1988, Brown got involved in a racially-charged angle with Robert Fuller and the Stud Stable, wherein Fuller gave Brown a watermelon as a gift, and beat him with a leather strap. Because of the co-promoting with the American Wrestling Association and World Class Championship Wrestling, he also had a chance to wrestle in the AWA and WCCW.

After SuperClash III, the AWA pulled out, and the CWA-WCCW cross-promotion continued, as Jerry Jarrett bought Fritz Von Erich's majority stake in WCCW. In February 1989, Brown won the WCCW Texas Heavyweight Championship, defeating Iceman King Parsons. He was champion for over a month, before losing to Gary Young. In late 1989, he briefly returned to Florida for Professional Wrestling Federation and the Gulf Coast for Continental Wrestling Federation. Back in Memphis, in April 1990, he won the USWA World Tag Team Championship with Sweet Daddy Falcone, defeating The Southern Rockers. They kept the belts for nearly a month before losing them back to the Southern Rockers. In November 1991, he went to Portland for Pacific Northwest Wrestling. His run in Portland ended in June 1992.

Back in Memphis, in April 1995, Brown won his second USWA World Tag Team Championship with The Gambler, defeating PG-13. They held onto the belts for over two weeks before losing them back to PG-13. In July 1995, Brown competed in the World Wrestling Federation as enhancement talent and worked two TV tapings, one against Hunter Hearst Helmsley and the next night against Henry O. Godwinn. In August 1995, he wrestled in Ozark Mountain Wrestling, which was the USWA's developmental territory. In May 1996, he won the USWA Television Championship, defeating Jesse James Armstrong. A month and a half later, he dropped the belt to Wolfie D. In July 1996, he quickly rebounded and won his third and final USWA World Tag Team Championship with Reggie B. Fine, defeating Bart Sawyer and Flex Kavana. They held onto the title for three weeks before losing it to The Moondogs. Brown left USWA in January 1997 before the company folded later that November.

=== Later career (1997–2017) ===
After leaving the USWA, Brown remained active in the independent scene for twenty years, mainly in Tennessee and Mississippi, until his cancer diagnosis in 2017. At Juggalo Championship Wrestling's 2011 internet pay-per-view Legends and Icons, he was one of four USWA alumni who lost a five-way match to Austin Idol.

== Personal life ==
In April 2017, Brown announced his diagnosis of stage 4 prostate cancer. In May 2018, he said the cancer had spread to his brain, despite treatment that impaired his eyesight and reduced his weight to 150 lb (68 kg). Several Southern promotions held benefit shows to help pay his medical bills, and the Cauliflower Alley Club's Benevolent Fund helped him pay his rent.

Brown was reported dead on July 20, 2018, from prostate cancer. The next day, Cauliflower Alley President B. Brian Blair said Brown was still alive after waking up in the night and telling his mother, who thought he was dead and was awaiting the coroner, that he was hungry.

Brown died on July 29, 2018. His funeral took place in Florida on August 11, which would have been his 58th birthday.

== Championships and accomplishments ==
- Continental Wrestling Association
  - AWA Southern Heavyweight Championship (1 time)
  - CWA Heavyweight Championship (1 time)
- Memphis Wrestling Hall of Fame
  - Class of 2022
- New Age Wrestling Alliance
  - NAWA Heavyweight Championship (1 time)
  - NAWA Tag Team Championship (2 times) - with CJ Stardust
- NWA Battle Zone
  - NWA Mississippi Heavyweight Championship (1 time)
- NWA Mid-South
  - NWA Mid-South Heavyweight Championship (1 time)
- Pro Wrestling Illustrated
  - PWI ranked him #130 of the 500 best singles wrestlers of the year in the PWI 500 in 1992
  - PWI ranked him #451 of the Top 500 Singles Wrestlers of the "PWI Years" in 2003
- Southeastern Championship Wrestling
  - NWA Southeastern Tag Team Championship (1 time) - with Norvell Austin
- South's Greatest Wrestling Fans
  - SGWF Heavyweight Championship (1 time)
- United States Wrestling Association
  - USWA Television Championship (1 time)
  - USWA World Tag Team Championship (3 times) - with Sweet Daddy Falcone (1), The Gambler (1), and Reggie B. Fine (1)
- World Class Championship Wrestling
  - WCWA Texas Heavyweight Championship (1 time)
- WWE
  - WWE Hall of Fame (Legacy Wing, Class of 2020)
