= Owen Family Super Extravaganza =

- Promotion: Pacific Northwest Wrestling
- Date: September 24, 1985
- City: Portland, Oregon
- Venue: Portland Memorial Coliseum
- Attendance: 8,000

Wrestling Extravaganza chronology
← Previous; 60th Anniversary Wrestling Extravaganza	Next → Superstar Extravaganza III

Owen Family Super Extravaganza was the second Wrestling Extravaganza supercard event produced by Pacific Northwest Wrestling (PNW). It was held on September 24, 1985 at the Portland Memorial Coliseum in Portland, Oregon. It was the second event in Memorial Coliseum that year after the 60th Anniversary Wrestling Extravaganza in May.

Just like the 60th Anniversary Wrestling Extravaganza, the supercard featured participation from PNW, American Wrestling Association (AWA) and National Wrestling Alliance (NWA). Featuring a card of six televised matches, the event was headlined by an AWA World Tag Team Championship match, in which The Road Warriors (Animal and Hawk) defeated Sgt. Slaughter and Billy Jack Haynes to retain the titles. In other major championship matches, Ric Flair fought Magnum T. A. to a thirty-minute time limit draw to retain the NWA World Heavyweight Championship and S & S Express (Steve Simpson and Joe Savoldi) defeated Karl Steiner and Mike Miller to win the NWA Pacific Northwest Tag Team Championship.

== Event ==
=== Preliminary matches ===
The televised event opened with a women's match between Debbie Combs and Liz Chase. The match ended in a draw.

Next, the Pacific Northwest Heavyweight Champion Ricky Vaughn took on Moondog Moretti in a non-title match. Vaughn delivered a powerslam to Moretti for the win.

It was followed by the first tag team match of the event, in which Bobby Jaggers and Steve Pardee took on The Russians (Ivan Koloff and Krusher Kruschev). Russians won the match after Kruschev blindsided Pardee from behind.

Next, Karl Steiner and Mike Miller defended the Pacific Northwest Tag Team Championship against The S And S Express (Joe Savoldi and Steve Simpson). S & S Express won the match after a bearhug and lariat combination and a running splash, becoming the new Pacific Northwest Tag Team Champions.

It was followed by the penultimate match of the event, in which Ric Flair defended the NWA World Heavyweight Championship against Magnum T. A.. Magnum nearly won the title while the referee was knocked out and he delivered a belly to belly suplex. However, the referee was unconscious and could not count the pinfall. As the referee recovered, Magnum tried to pin Flair with a backslide but got a near-fall and the thirty-minute time limit expired. As a result, Flair retained the title.

=== Main event match ===
The Road Warriors (Animal and Hawk) defended the AWA World Tag Team Championship against Billy Jack Haynes and Sgt. Slaughter in the main event. Slaughter eventually hit Road Warriors with a chair while they were double teaming Haynes. As a result, Slaughter and Haynes were disqualified and Road Warriors retained the title.

== Reception ==
It was a major event in PNW history, just behind the 60th Anniversary Wrestling Extravaganza earlier in the year. The event drew a crowd of 8,000 fans in attendance and received praise from Arnold Furious. He believed that "Flair vs. Magnum is way above everything else on this show" and felt that the entire card was "a heated affair. Almost every match was over with the crowd."

== Aftermath ==
Karl Steiner and Mike Miller received their rematch against S & S Express for the Pacific Northwest Tag Team Championship, the following day, on September 25. S & S Express won again to retain the titles.

== Results ==
No.	Results	Stipulations	Times
1^{D}	Rip Oliver defeated Chris Colt	Singles match	—
2^{D}	Alexis Smirnoff defeated Scott Doring	Singles match	—
3^{D}	Bruiser Brody vs. Jesse Barr ended in a draw	Singles match	—
4	Debbie Combs vs. Liz Chase ended in a draw	Singles match	—
5	Ricky Vaughn defeated Moondog Moretti	Singles match	—
6	The Russians (Ivan Koloff and Krusher Kruschev) defeated Bobby Jaggers and Steve Pardee	Tag team match	—
7	The S And S Express (Joe Savoldi and Steve Simpson) defeated Karl Steiner and Mike Miller (c)	Tag team match for the NWA Pacific Northwest Tag Team Championship	—
8	Ric Flair (c) vs. Magnum T. A. ended in a time limit draw	Singles match for the NWA World Heavyweight Championship	30:00
9	The Road Warriors (Animal and Hawk) (c) defeated Billy Jack Haynes and Sgt. Slaughter by disqualification	Tag team match for the AWA World Tag Team Championship	—
(c) / – the champion(s) heading into the match; D / – this was a dark match

== See also ==
- 1985 in professional wrestling
