= C. W. Bergstrom =

American professional wrestler

C.W. Bergstrom
Personal information
- Born: February 24, 1957 (age 69) Portland, Oregon, United States
- Website: C.W. Bergstrom on Myspace

Professional wrestling career
- Ring name(s): C.W. Bergstrom; Principal Bergstrom
- Billed height: 6 ft 4 in (1.93 m)
- Billed weight: 265 lb (120 kg)
- Billed from: Milwaukie, Oregon
- Debut: December 3, 1988

C.W. Bergstrom (born February 24, 1957) is an American semi-retired professional wrestler who was active in North American regional promotions during the early 1990s including a memorable stint in the United States Wrestling Association (USWA) as Principal Bergstrom. He was one of the last major stars in Don Owen's Pacific Northwest Wrestling during its final years and was the last wrestler to hold the NWA Pacific Northwest Heavyweight Championship.

== Career ==
=== Pacific Northwest Wrestling ===
Born and raised in Portland, Oregon, C.W. Bergstrom made his debut in Pacific Northwest Wrestling in December 1988, losing to Art Barr in his very first match. A month later, he took part in a joint show with World Championship Wrestling, losing to Mike Golden at the Kaiser Convention Center in Oakland, California on January 14, 1989. In March 1989, he began teaming up with The Grappler and defeated Scott Peterson and Billy Two Eagles on March 12. He and Denton lost to The Southern Rockers (Steve Doll and Scott Peterson) the next month.

On April 21, he and Scotty the Body entered the championship tournament for the then vacant NWA Pacific Northwest Tag Team Championship but were eliminated by The Southern Rockers (Steve Doll & Scott Peterson) who also defeated Al Madril and Joey Jackson and Colonel DeBeers and Nord the Barbarian to win the tournament. He also acted as a special guest referee in a televised match between Al Madril and Jeff Warner on January 27, 1990. Warner was disqualified when he attempted to use a foreign object that Madril had brought to the ring.

Bergstrom lost to Denton twice later that year, including a disqualification loss in Salem, Oregon on October 19, and lost to him in a tag team match with Bill Francis against Denton and Brian Adams in Portland on December 23, 1989. During the next year, he would lose to Denton on June 23 and, in a tag team match with Craig Valeri, lost to Denton and The Equalizer on December 29, 1990. Throughout 1991, he faced Denton and the Equalizer with several tag team partners including Larry Oliver and Bart Sawyer and also defeated Denton in Estacada, Oregon on May 22.

On June 22, Bergstrom fought "Pretty Boy" Doug Masters to a time-limit draw. During the match, Bergstrom suffered a serious knee injury attempting a leapfrog. When color commentator Jimmy Jack Funk attempted to help Bergstrom leave the ring, he was attacked by Masters as well causing Funk to enter the match on Bergstrom's behalf until medical personnel were able to take Bergstrom back to the dressing room. Bergstrom was Master's second opponent of the night, the first being Mike Winner. Later that year, he and Mike Winner lost to Len Denton & Don Harris and, in Vancouver, Washington on December 29, 1991.

The following year, Bergstrom captured the NWA Pacific Northwest Heavyweight Championship from Ron Harris on April 21, 1992 and held the title until the promotion folded three months later.

=== United States Wrestling Association ===
After PNW's closure, Bergstrom arrived in the Memphis-based United States Wrestling Association where he had a brief but memorable run as Principal Bergstrom. In one of his earliest matches in the promotion, he lost to Jeff Gaylord via disqualification in a "strap on a pole" match at the Mid-South Coliseum on May 24, 1993. Losing to Jerry Lawler on May 31, he continued to feud with Jeff Gaylord beating him on June 14 and Danny Davis on June 21. Defeating Jeff Gaylord on July 5, he and Melvin Penrod, Jr. defeated USWA Tag Team Champions New Jack and Homeboy for the titles later that night.

They successfully defended the titles for several weeks, including a title defense against Well Dunn (Rex King and Steve Doll) on July 12, and defeated Jeff Jarrett and The Moondogs (Moondog Spike & Moondog Cujo) in a 6-man tag team match with USWA Southern Heavyweight Champion The Vampire Warrior on July 26. They eventually lost the tag team titles to The Moondogs at the Mid-South Coliseum on August 2. Splitting up immediately after losing the titles, Bergstrom defeated Melvin Penrod in a "Loser Leaves Town" match a week later. After another loss to Jeff Jarrett, Bergstrom left the promotion wrestling his last match against Colin Scotts on September 13, 1993. He was later involved in talks with the World Wrestling Federation to bring in his character to feud with The 1-2-3 Kid as The Principal, but nothing ever came of it. The WWF would later use Shane Douglas in a similar in-ring persona during his second stint with the company.

On June 22, 1994, he appeared at a wrestling show for Art Barr teaming with Billy Jack Haynes and Rey Misterio, Jr. in a 6-man tag team match against Psicosis, Ryuma Go and Col. DeBeers. This card was organized as a sort of reunion show featuring former PNW stars as well as Mexican luchadores of Asistencia Asesoría y Administración.

=== Semi-retirement and the independent circuit ===
Bergstrom would remain inactive during much of the 1990s, but returned to action in local independent promotions in the old Pacific Northwest territory. In July 1999, he headlined a wrestling event for promoter John Skinner at the Medford Armory losing to Steve "The Gigolo" Rizzano. This was the first wrestling event held in Medford, Oregon in nearly a decade. Returning to Eugene four months later, he teamed with Lou Andrews and Big Daddy Thunder in a 6-man tag team match fighting to a double-disqualification against Len Denton, Bruiser Brian and Billy Two Eagles on November 13, 1999.

On October 23, 2005, Bergstrem defeated Governor Wilson Kaine to win the CPW Heavyweight Championship. He also defeated Critter at an event for Sandy Barr's IGA Wrestling in Prineville, Oregon on December 10. He spent the next two years with Championship Pro Wrestling and NWA Oregon winning the NWA Oregon Heavyweight title three times. He won the NWA Oregon Heavyweight Championship from Colossus at the Benton County Fairgrounds in Corvallis on January 6, 2007. On January 31, Bergstrom defeated Heavyweight Champion Dr. Kliever at the Chehalem Armory Center in Newberg. This was a fundraising event for the Newberg High School water polo teams and, according to the Chehalem Park and Recreation District's Jim McMaster, this was the first wrestling event to be held in the city in over twenty years.

That same year, he competed for BAW Championship Wrestling. Although losing to "Big Ugly" JD Bishop on April 20, he beat Drake Frost and Alexis Smirnoff, Jr. during the summer. While in New Revolution Wrestling, he and Ritchie Magnett feuded with the NRW Tag Team Champions the Pacific Coast Blondes (Cameron Starr & Hearthrob Hanson) facing them in a series of matches during the summer, including a Canadian Lumberjack match in June 2007. Bergstrom defeated Tod Ruhl who submitted to a cross arm breaker at the "Final Friday" supercard in Gresham, Oregon on July 27, 2007. When Ruhl's valet Megan Nicole Desire attempted to distract the referee, Bergstrom pulled her into the ring. Bergstrom was immediately attacked by the Pacific Coast Blondes and Tod Ruhl, but was saved by Pete Storm who helped Bergstrom clear the ring.

== Championships and accomplishments ==
- Championship Pro Wrestling
  - CPW Heavyweight Championship (1 time)
- NWA Oregon
  - NWA Oregon Heavyweight Championship (3 times)
- Pacific Northwest Wrestling
  - NWA Pacific Northwest Heavyweight Championship (1 time, final)
- United States Wrestling Alliance
  - USWA Tag Team Championship (1 time) - with Melvin Penrod, Jr.
- Portland Wrestling
  - Portland Pacific Northwest Heavyweight Championship (1 time)
  - Portland Pacific Northwest Tag Team Championship (3 times) - with Lou Andrews (2) and Big Daddy Thunder
- Pro Wrestling Illustrated
  - PWI ranked him # 97 of the 500 best singles wrestlers of the PWI 500 in 1993
