= 1985 in professional wrestling =

1985 in professional wrestling describes the year's events in the world of professional wrestling.

== List of notable promotions ==
These promotions held notable events in 1985.

Promotion Name	Abbreviation
All Japan Pro Wrestling	AJPW
All Japan Women's Pro Wrestling	AJW
American Wrestling Association	AWA
Empresa Mexicana de Lucha Libre	EMLL
Florida Championship Wrestling	FCW
Lutte Internationale	Lutte
Mid-South Wrestling	Mid-South
National Wrestling Alliance	NWA
New Japan Pro-Wrestling	NJPW
Pacific Northwest Wrestling	PNW
Polynesian Pro Wrestling	PPP
World Class Championship Wrestling	WCCW
World Wrestling Council	WWC
World Wrestling Federation	WWF

== Calendar of notable shows ==
Date	Promotion(s)	Event	Location	Main Event
February 18	WWF	The War to Settle the Score	New York City, New York	Hulk Hogan (c) defeated Roddy Piper by disqualification in a singles match for the WWF World Heavyweight Championship
February 24	AWA / NWA	Star Wars	East Rutherford, New Jersey	Sgt. Slaughter won a "tag team battle royal." Slaughter's partner, Jerry Blackwell, was injured and could not compete, forcing Slaughter to wrestle alone. Also in the match were: The Road Warriors, Ivan and Nikita Koloff, Greg Gagne and Jim Brunzell, Kamala and Billy Robinson, Mark and Chris Youngblood, Jerry Lawler and Baron Von Raschke, Bob Backlund and Jimmy Valiant, Mr. Saito and Masked Superstar, Nick Bockwinkel and Dory Funk Jr., Jimmy Garvin and Larry Zbyszko, and Steve Keirn and Jerry Oski
March 1 – April 18	NJPW	Young Lion Cup	Tokyo, Japan	Shunji Kosugi defeated Keiichi Yamada in the tournament final
March 31	WWF	WrestleMania	New York City, New York	Hulk Hogan and Mr. T defeated Paul Orndorff and Roddy Piper in a Tag team match with Muhammad Ali and Pat Patterson as special guest referees
April 5	EMLL	29. Aniversario de Arena México	Mexico City, Mexico	Pirata Morgan defeats El Egipcio by disqualification in a Lucha de Apuestas hair vs. hair match
April 21	AWA	StarCage 1985	St. Paul, Minnesota	Sgt. Slaughter & Jerry Blackwell beat Masked Superstar, King Tonga, & Adnan Al-Kassie in a Handicap Steel Cage match
May 5	WCCW	2nd Von Erich Memorial Parade of Champions	Irving, Texas	Kerry Von Erich defeated One Man Gang in a Hair vs. One Man Gang facing Fritz Von Erich match
May 10	WWF	Saturday Night's Main Event	Uniondale, New York	Hulk Hogan (c) defeated Bob Orton by disqualification in a singles match to retain the WWF World Heavyweight Championship
May 21	PNW	60th Anniversary Wrestling Extravaganza	Portland, Oregon	Ric Flair (c) vs. Billy Jack Haynes ended in a time limit draw for the NWA World Heavyweight Championship
May 10 – June 15	NJPW	IWGP League	Matsumoto, Japan	André the Giant defeated Tatsumi Fujinami in a tournament final
June 25	AJW	Japan Grand Prix Finals	Tokyo, Japan	Lioness Asuka defeated Dump Matsumoto in the finals
July 6	NWA	The Great American Bash	Charlotte, North Carolina	Dusty Rhodes defeated Tully Blanchard (c) in a Steel cage match for the NWA World Television Championship
July 8	WWF	King of the Ring	Foxboro, Massachusetts	Hulk Hogan (c) defeated Nikolai Volkoff in a singles match for the WWF World Heavyweight Championship
July 27	Mid-South	Wrestlefest	Tulsa, Oklahoma	Bill Watts, Jim Duggan & Dick Murdoch defeated Kareem Muhammad, Kamala & Skandar Akbar
August 3	PPP	A Hot Summer Night	Honolulu, Hawaii	Ric Flair (c) fought Siva Afi to a double disqualification in a singles match for the NWA World Heavyweight Championship
August 16	AWA / NWA	Star Wars	East Rutherford, New Jersey	The Road Warriors (Animal and Hawk) defeated The Fabulous Freebirds (Michael Hayes, Terry Gordy and Buddy Roberts) by disqualification in a six-man tag team match
August 26	Lutte; WWF	Lutte vs. WWF	Montreal, Quebec, Canada	Dino Bravo and King Tonga defeated Nikolai Volkoff and The Iron Sheik in a tag team match
September 2	FCW	Battle of the Belts	Tampa, Florida	Ric Flair (c) defeated Wahoo McDaniel in 2 out of 3 three falls match for the NWA World Heavyweight Championship
September 20	EMLL	EMLL 52nd Anniversary Show	Mexico City, Mexico	Event was cancelled due to the 1985 Mexico City earthquake
September 21	CSP	CSP 12th Anniversary Show	San Juan, Puerto Rico	Jimmy Valiant defeated Kamala in a singles match by disqualification
September 28	AWA	SuperClash	Chicago, Illinois	Rick Martel (c) fought Stan Hansen to a double countout in a singles match for the AWA World Heavyweight Championship
October 3	WWF	Saturday Night's Main Event	East Rutherford, New Jersey	Hulk Hogan (c) defeated Nikolai Volkoff in a singles match to retain the WWF World Heavyweight Championship
October 6	WCCW	Cotton Bowl Extravaganza	Dallas, Texas	Kerry and Kevin Von Erich defeated The Dynamic Duo (Chris Adams and Gino Hernandez) in a Hair vs. Hair match
October 6	AJW	Tag League The Best Finals	Tokyo, Japan	The Crush Gals (Chigusa Nagayo and Lioness Asuka) defeated Gokuaku Domei (Bull Nakano and Dump Matsumoto) in the finals
October 19	WWC	Battle of the Gladiators	San Juan, Puerto Rico	Carlos Colón defeated Abdullah the Butcher in a singles match to win the vacant WWC Universal Championship
October 31	WWF	Saturday Night's Main Event	Hershey, Pennsylvania	Hulk Hogan and André the Giant defeated King Kong Bundy and Big John Studd in a tag team match by disqualification
November 7	WWF	The Wrestling Classic	Rosemont, Illinois	Junkyard Dog defeated Randy Savage by count-out in a tournament finals match
November 15 – December 12	NJPW	IWGP Tag Title League	Sendai, Japan	Tatsumi Fujinami and Kengo Kimura defeated Antonio Inoki and Seiji Sakaguchi in a tournament final
November 23 – December 12	AJPW	AJPW Real World Tag League	Tokyo, Japan	Ted DiBiase and Stan Hansen won the tournament
November 28	NWA	Starcade	Greensboro, North Carolina; Atlanta, Georgia	Dusty Rhodes defeated Ric Flair (c) in a singles match by disqualification for the NWA World Heavyweight Championship
December 6	EMLL	Juicio Final	Mexico City, Mexico	El Solar II vs. Belcebu in a Lucha de Apuestas, mask vs. mask match
December 19	WWF	Saturday Night's Main Event	Tampa, Florida	Hulk Hogan (c) defeated Terry Funk in a singles match to retain the WWF World Heavyweight Championship
December 29	AWA / NWA	Night of Champions II	East Rutherford, New Jersey	Stan Hansen defeated Rick Martel (c) by submission in a singles match for the AWA World Heavyweight Championship
(c) – denotes defending champion(s)

== Tournaments and accomplishments ==
=== AJW ===
Accomplishment	Winner	Date won	Notes
Japan Grand Prix 1985	Lioness Asuka	June 25	
Rookie of the Year Decision Tournament	Akemi Sakamoto		
Tag League the Best 1985	Bull Nakano and Dump Matsumoto	October 10	

=== JCP ===
Accomplishment	Winner	Date won	Notes
Bunkhouse Stampede	Dusty Rhodes	December 28	

=== WWF ===
Accomplishment	Winner	Date won	Notes
King of the Ring	Don Muraco	July 8	
The Wrestling Classic	Junkyard Dog	November 7	

== Awards and honors ==
- All Japan Women's Pro-Wrestling
  - AJW Rookie of the Year: Akira Hokuto

=== Pro Wrestling Illustrated ===
Category	Winner
PWI Wrestler of the Year	Ric Flair
PWI Tag Team of the Year	The Road Warriors (Hawk and Animal)
PWI Match of the Year	Hulk Hogan and Mr. T vs. Roddy Piper and Paul Orndorff (WrestleMania)
PWI Most Popular Wrestler of the Year	Hulk Hogan
PWI Most Hated Wrestler of the Year	Roddy Piper
PWI Most Improved Wrestler of the Year	Steve Williams
PWI Most Inspirational Wrestler of the Year	Mike Von Erich
PWI Rookie of the Year	Nord the Barbarian
PWI Manager of the Year	Jim Cornette
PWI Editor's Award	Dan Shocket

=== Wrestling Observer Newsletter ===
Category	Winner
Wrestler of the Year	Ric Flair
Feud of the Year	Ted DiBiase vs. Jim Duggan
Tag Team of the Year	The British Bulldogs (Dynamite Kid and Davey Boy Smith)
Most Improved	Steve Williams
Best on Interviews	Jim Cornette

== Title changes ==
=== WWF ===
WWF World Heavyweight Championship
Incoming champion – Hulk Hogan
Date	Winner	Event/Show	Note(s)
No title changes

WWF Intercontinental Championship
Incoming champion – Greg Valentine
Date	Winner	Event/Show	Note(s)
July 6	Tito Santana	House show	It was a steel cage match

WWF World Martial Arts Heavyweight Championship
Incoming champion – Antonio Inoki
Date	Winner	Event/Show	Note(s)
No title changes

WWF Junior Heavyweight Championship
Incoming champion – The Cobra
Date	Winner	Event/Show	Note(s)
May 20	Hiro Saito	House show	
July 28	The Cobra	House show	
October 31	Abandoned	N/A	

WWF International Heavyweight Championship
Incoming champion – Tatsumi Fujinami
Date	Winner	Event/Show	Note(s)
July 19	Vacant	N/A	
October 31	Vacant	N/A	

WWF International Tag Team Championship
(Title reactivated)
Date	Winner	Event/Show	Note(s)
May 24	Tatsumi Fujinami and Kengo Kimura	House show	
October 31	Deactivated	N/A	

WWF Canadian Championship
(Title created)
Date	Winner	Event/Show	Note(s)
August 18	Dino Bravo	House show	

WWF Women's Tag Team Championship
Incoming champions – Velvet McIntyre and Desiree Petersen
Date	Winner	Event/Show	Note(s)
August 1	The Glamour Girls (Leilani Kai and Judy Martin)	Live event	

WWF Women's Championship
Incoming champion – Wendi Richter
Date	Winner	Event/Show	Note(s)
February 18	Leilani Kai	The War to Settle the Score	
March 31	Wendi Richter	WrestleMania I	
November 25	The Masked Spider Lady (Fabulous Moolah)	Live event	

WWF Tag Team Championship
Incoming champions – The North-South Connection (Adrian Adonis and Dick Murdoch)
Date	Winner	Event/Show	Note(s)
January 21	The U.S. Express (Mike Rotundo and Barry Windham)	House show	
March 31	The Iron Sheik and Nikolai Volkoff	WrestleMania I	
June 17	The U.S. Express (Mike Rotundo and Barry Windham)	Championship Wrestling	It aired on tape delay on July 13.
August 24	The Dream Team (Brutus Beefcake and Greg Valentine)	House show	

== Spinoff media ==
- Wrestling Eye magazine publish its first issue and hit the newsstands
- Hulk Hogan's Rock 'n Wrestling premiered on CBS.
- Mutharamkunnu P.O., directed by Sibi Malayil and starring Mukesh and Lizy, is released. The film is noted for the special appearance of Indian actor-wrestler Dara Singh as himself.
- British wrestler "Mr. TV" Jackie Pallo's autobiography "You Grunt, I'll Groan" is published.
- Welsh wrestler-promoter Orig Williams's autobiography "Cario'r Ddraig: Stori El Bandito" is published.
- The Wrestling Album is released by the World Wrestling Federation. It is the first album released by the WWF and featuring mostly theme music of wrestlers on the roster at the time.

== Births ==
- January 13 – Luke Robinson
- January 17 – Sage Beckett
- January 18 – Mark Briscoe
- January 27 – Yuji Hino
- February 3 – Angela Fong
- February 20 – Killian Dain
- February 26 – Pentagón Jr.
- March 5 – Martin Casaus
- March 13 – Matt Jackson
- March 20 - Matt Taven
- March 24 – Lana
- April 10 – Yūki Ōno
- April 20 – Curt Hawkins
- April 29 – Jay Lethal
- May 8 – Tommaso Ciampa
- May 14 – Zack Ryder
- May 16 – Mike Kanellis
- May 19 – Aleister Black
- May 24 – The Great Naga
- May 25 – Roman Reigns
- June 6 – Drew McIntyre
- June 30 – Cody Rhodes
- July 2 – Jessie Belle Smothers
- July 16 – Q. T. Marshall
- July 22 – Akira Tozawa
- August 2 – Davey Boy Smith Jr.
- August 6 – Tony Nese
- August 7 – Jamin Olivencia
- August 12 – Fallah Bahh
- August 14 – Jaysin Strife (died in 2022)
- August 20 – Mikey Nicholls
- August 22 –
  - Jimmy Uso
  - Jey Uso
- August 26 – Ayumu Gunji
- September 7 – Tristan Archer
- September 19 – Renee Young
- September 24 –
  - Shane Haste
  - Sanga
- September 29 – Candice LeRae
- October 12 – Amy Zidian
- October 18 - Atsushi Kotoge
- November 25 – Yuki Sato
- December 7 – Dean Ambrose/Jon Moxley
- December 14 – Katsuya Kitamura (died in 2022)
- December 16 – Psycho Clown
- December 21 – Oney Lorcan
- December 28 – Taryn Terrell

== Debuts ==
- Uncertain debut date

- Big Van Vader
- Brittany Brown
- Jimmy Del Ray
- Lou Fabiano
- Paul Diamond
- Savio Vega
- Virgil
- Histeria

- January 22 - Nick Kiniski
- March 3 - Masakatsu Funaki
- April 29 - Miguel Pérez Jr.
- May 16 - Drill Nakamae (All Japan Women's)
- May 27 - Mitsuko Nishiwaki (All Japan Women's)
- June 5 - Yumiko Hotta and Kyoko Aso (All Japan Women's)
- June 6 - Grizzly Iwamoto (All Japan Women's)
- June 12 - Akira Hokuto and Suzuka Minami (All Japan Women's)
- June 14 - Fumie Kanzaki (All Japan Women's) and Sayuri Nakajima (All Japan Women's)
- July 8 - Yoji Anjo
- July 23 - Yasuko Ishiguro (All Japan Women's)
- July 25 - Rie Okabyashi (All Japan Women's) and Akemi Sakamoto (All Japan Women's)
- July 30 - Miss Elizabeth
- August 28 - Kahoru Kage (All Japan Women's)
- August 30 - Scorpio Jr.
- October 31 - Lex Luger
- November 22 Chris Benoit
- November 28
  - Sting
  - The Ultimate Warrior
  - Hollywood
  - Lisa Moretti

== Retirements ==
- Jack Brisco (1965–1985)
- Gerald Brisco (1967–1985) (Returned to wrestling in 1998 and retired 2000)
- Cora Combs (1945–1985)
- George Scott (1948–1985)
- Gil Hayes (1966–1985)
- Chief Jay Strongbow (1955–1985)
- Larry Hennig (1956–1985)
- Wally Karbo (1935–1985)
- Buzz Tyler (1977–1985)
- Pat Patterson (1959–1985) (Returned to wrestling in 1998 and retired 2000)

== Deaths ==
- January 12 - Paul Luty, British wrestler (b. 1932)
- January 21 – Eddie Graham, American wrestler and Championship Wrestling from Florida promoter (b. 1930)
- March 6:
  - Wild Bull Curry, American wrestler (b. 1913)
  - Bholu Pahalwan, Indian wrestler (b. 1922)
- April 19 - Chabela Romero (b. 1936)
- September 3 – Jay Youngblood, American wrestler (b. 1955)
- September 18 – Ed Don George, American wrestler and promoter (b. 1905)
- November 1 – Rick McGraw, American WWF wrestler (b. 1955)
- December 24:
  - Pierre "Mad Dog" Lefebvre, Canadian wrestler (b. 1955)
  - Tarzan Tyler, Canadian wrestler and manager (b. 1927)
  - Adrien Debois, Canadian wrestling referee (b. 1950)
