= Tony Falk =

American professional wrestler (born 1961)

Personal information
- Born: Anthony Felker; August 13, 1961 (age 64) Paducah, Kentucky, U.S.

Professional wrestling career
- Ring name(s): Tony Falk; 2 Falk 4 Sure; Cowboy Tony; Great Bolo; Scorpio
- Billed height: 6 ft 1 in (1.85 m)
- Billed weight: 240 lb (110 kg; 17 st)
- Debut: 1981
- Retired: 2017

Anthony Felker (born August 13, 1961) is an American retired professional wrestler, referee, promoter and trainer. He is best known for his appearances in the Memphis-based promotion United States Wrestling Association in the 1990s under the ring name Tony Falk.

== Professional wrestling career ==
Falk his debut in 1981 for International Championship Wrestling until the promotions folded in 1984. He worked for Mid-South Wrestling, Continental Wrestling Association, Southwest Championship Wrestling, World Wrestling Council and World Class Championship Wrestling. Also was a referee in WCCW where he reffed Steve Austin's first match.

When World Class closed its doors it merged into United States Wrestling Association in Tennessee in 1989. Falk became a household name for the promotion until USWA folded in 1997. He also continued refereeing. He won the USWA Television Championship in May 1996 defeating Jesse James Armstrong. He dropped the title back to Armstrong two weeks later.

After USWA, Falk stayed in Memphis working for Power Pro Wrestling, the United States Wrestling Organization and the independents until retiring in 2017.

Falk trained his son, LT Falk to become a wrestler. Trained many other Tennessee wrestlers.

He was also the promoter of All-Star Wrestling in Paducah, Kentucky from 1994 to 2004 and United States Wrestling Organization in Nashville, Tennessee from 2002 to 2013.

In Paducah, the town celebrates "Tony Falk Day" on August 13 which is Falk's birthday.

== Championships and accomplishments ==
- Memphis Wrestling Hall of Fame
  - Class of 2021
- NWA Mid-America
  - NWA Mid-America Heavyweight Championship (1 time)
- Pro Wrestling Illustrated
  - PWI ranked Tony Falk # 152 of the 500 best singles wrestlers of the PWI 500 in 1992
  - PWI ranked Tony Falk # 234 of the 500 best singles wrestlers of the PWI 500 in 1993
  - PWI ranked Tony Falk # 315 of the 500 best singles wrestlers of the PWI 500 in 1994
  - PWI ranked Tony Falk # 245 of the 500 best singles wrestlers of the PWI 500 in 1996
- World Wrestling Council
  - WWC World Junior Heavyweight Championship (1 time)
- United States Wrestling Association
  - USWA Television Championship (1 time)
