= USWA Television Championship =

Professional wrestling championship

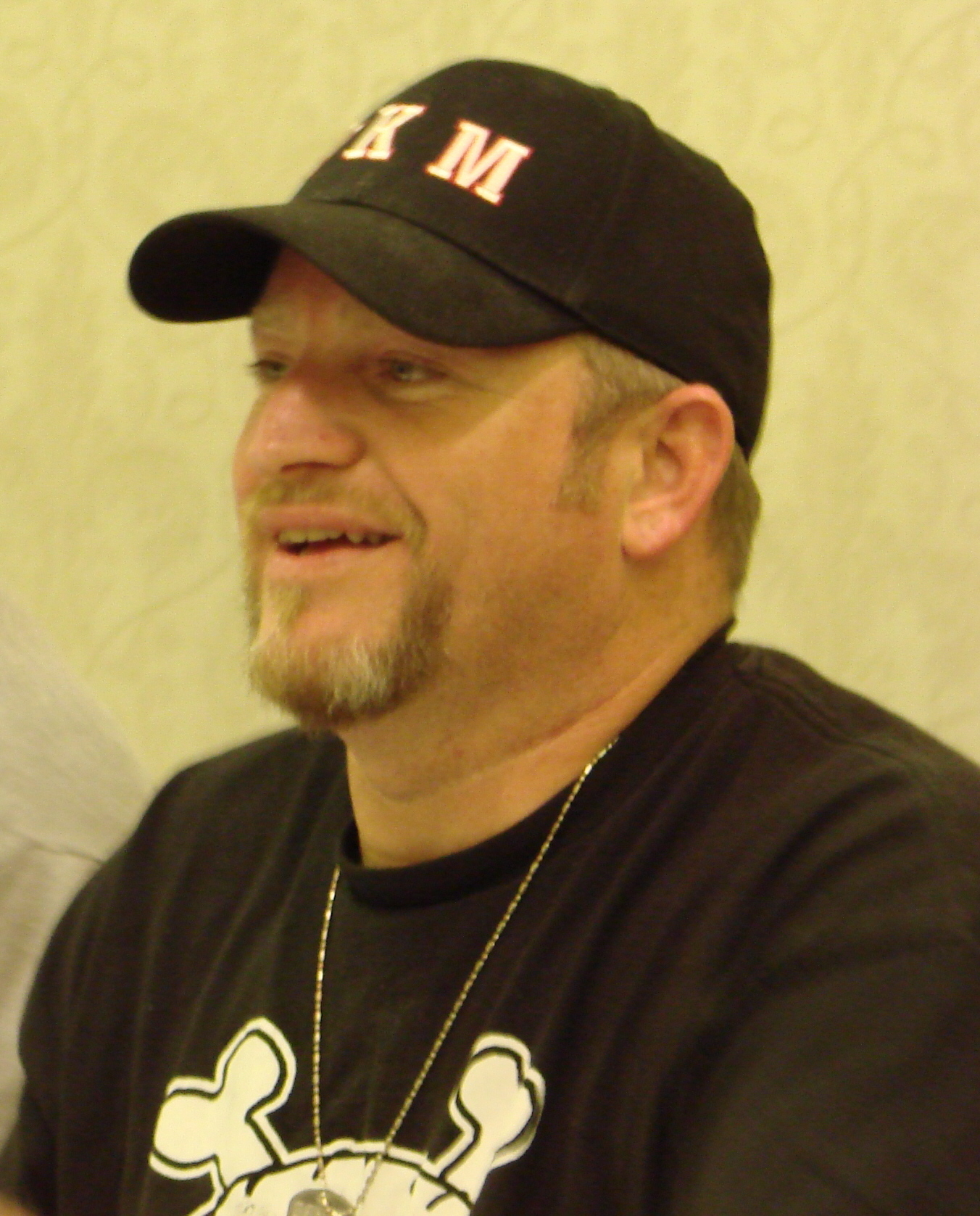
- Jesse James Armstrong, the first champion

Details
- Promotion: United States Wrestling Association
- Date retired: November 3, 1996
Statistics
- First champion(s): Jesse James Armstrong
- Most reigns: Jesse James Armstrong (2 reigns)
- Longest reign: Wolfie D (73 days)
- Shortest reign: Brickhouse Brown (4 days)

The USWA Television Championship was a secondary title in the United States Wrestling Association that was primarily defended on USWA Championship Wrestling, which was the USWA's television show. It existed from 1996.

== Title history ==
Key
No.	Overall reign number
Reign	Reign number for the specific champion
Days	Number of days held

No.	Champion	Championship change			Reign statistics		Notes	Ref.
No.	Champion	Date	Event	Location	Reign	Days	Notes	Ref.
1	Jesse James Armstrong	April 13, 1996	USWA show	Memphis, Tennessee	1	21	Won a battle royal on 1000th USWA TV show.	
2	Tony Falk	May 4, 1996	USWA show	Memphis, Tennessee	1	15		
3	Jesse James Armstrong	May 19, 1996	USWA show	Memphis, Tennessee	2	22		
—	Vacated	June 10, 1996	—	—	—	—	Armstrong lost a loser-leaves-town match to Jeff Jarrett	
4	Brickhouse Brown	June 15, 1996	USWA show	Memphis, Tennessee	1	4	Defeated Bart Sawyer.	
5	Wolfie D	June 19, 1996	USWA show	Memphis, Tennessee	1	73		
6	Jamie Dundee	August 31, 1996	USWA show	Memphis, Tennessee	1	(Note: The exact date the championship was abandoned is unclear, which means that the championship reign lasted between 62 and 91 days.)		
—	Deactivated	November 3, 1996	—	—	—	—	Championship abandoned	
