= CWUSA Television Championship =

Professional wrestling championship

Details
- Promotion: Championship Wrestling USA
- Date established: August 22, 1992
- Date retired: June 1997
Statistics
- First champion: Bart Sawyer
- Final champion: Buddy Wayne

The Championship Wrestling USA Television Championship was a professional wrestling championship defended in Championship Wrestling USA (the former Pacific Northwest Wrestling promotion), owned by Sandy Barr. It was CWUSA's longest running title, lasting from 1992 through 1997.

== Title history ==
Key

Symbol	Meaning
No.	The overall championship reign
Reign	The reign number for the specific wrestler listed.
Event	The event in which the championship changed hands
N/A	The specific information is not known
—	Used for vacated reigns in order to not count it as an official reign
[Note #]	Indicates that the exact length of the title reign is unknown, with a note providing more details.
(NLT)	"No Later Than"

#	Wrestler	Reign	Date	Days held and	Location	Event	Notes	Ref.
1	Bart Sawyer	1	August 22, 1992	49	Portland, Oregon	House show	Defeated Ron Harris in tournament final to become the first champion.	
2	Mike Winner	1	October 10, 1992	4	Portland, Oregon	House show		
3	John Rambo	1	October 14, 1992	24	Salem, Oregon	House show		
4	Dirty White Boy	1	November 7, 1992	(Note: The exact date the championship was lost is uncertain, which means this title reign lasted between 1 and 54 days.)	N/A	House show		
5	John Rambo	2	1992	(Note: The exact date that the championship was won is uncertain, which means the title reign lasted between 9 and 62 days.)	N/A	House show		
6	Bart Sawyer	2	January 9, 1993	14	Portland, Oregon	House show		
7	Colonel DeBeers	1	January 23, 1993	28	Portland, Oregon	House show		
8	Bart Sawyer	3	February 20, 1993	7	Portland, Oregon	House show		
9	Colonel DeBeers	2	February 27, 1993	119	Portland, Oregon	House show		
10	Silver Shadow	1	June 26, 1993	134	Portland, Oregon	House show		
11	Colonel DeBeers	3	July 10, 1993	196	Portland, Oregon	House show		
12	Bruiser Brian	1	January 22, 1994	35	Portland, Oregon	House show		
13	Colonel DeBeers	4	February 26, 1994	722	Portland, Oregon	House show		
14	Buddy Wayne	1	February 18, 1996	(Note: The exact date Buddy Wayne lost the championship is uncertain, which means that the championship reign lasted between 1 day and 139 days.)	Vancouver, Washington	House show	Won the title after accidentally pinning his tag team partner DeBeers in a match against Bart Sawyer and Sumito.	
15	Sumito	1	July 6, 1996 (NLT)	(Note: The exact date Sumito won the championship is uncertain, which means that the championship reign lasted between 1 day and 139 days.)	N/A	House show		
16	Buddy Wayne	2	July 7, 1996	(Note: The exact date Buddy Wayne lost the championship is uncertain, which means that the championship reign lasted between 1 day and 55 days.)	Vancouver, Washington	House show		
17	Sumito	2	August 31, 1996 (NLT)	(Note: The exact date Sumito won and lost the championship is uncertain, which means that the championship reign lasted between 1 day and 145 days.)	N/A	House show		
18	Buddy Wayne	3	November 30, 1996 (NLT)	(Note: The exact date Buddy Wayne won the championship is uncertain, which means that the championship reign lasted between 15 and 105 days.)	N/A	House show		
19	Bart Sawyer	4	December 15, 1996	7	Vancouver, Washington	House show		
20	Buddy Wayne	4	December 22, 1996	79	Vancouver, Washington	House show		
21	Matt Borne	1	March 11, 1997	7	Vancouver, Washington	House show		
22	Colonel DeBeers	5	March 18, 1997	(Note: The exact date Col. DeBeers lost the championship is uncertain, which means the championship reign lasted between 1 day and 13 days.)	Vancouver, Washington	House show		
23	Buddy Wayne	5	March 31, 1997 (NLT)	(Note: The exact date the championship was won and abandoned is uncertain, which means the championship reign lasted between 62 and 103 days/)	N/A	House show		
-	Abandoned	-	June 1997	N/A	N/A	N/A	Promotion closed.	

== See also ==
- Pacific Northwest Wrestling
- National Wrestling Alliance
