= PNW Wrestling Extravaganza =

Professional wrestling supercard promoted by Pacific Northwest Wrestling

Wrestling Extravaganza
- Promotions: Pacific Northwest Wrestling
- First event: 60th Anniversary Wrestling Extravaganza
- Last event: Superstar Extravaganza

The PNW Wrestling Extravaganza was a series of three professional wrestling supercards held by the Pacific Northwest Wrestling (PNW), also known as Portland Wrestling at the Portland Memorial Coliseum in Portland, Oregon.

== Events ==
#	Event	Date	City	Venue	Attendance	Main event
1	60th Anniversary Wrestling Extravaganza	May 21, 1985	Portland, Oregon	Portland Memorial Coliseum	13,000	Ric Flair (c) vs. Billy Jack Haynes for the NWA World Heavyweight Championship
2	Owen Family Super Extravaganza	September 24, 1985	Portland, Oregon	Portland Memorial Coliseum	8,000	The Road Warriors (Animal and Hawk) (c) vs. Billy Jack Haynes and Sgt. Slaughter for the AWA World Tag Team Championship
3	Superstar Extravaganza	January 21, 1986	Portland, Oregon	Portland Memorial Coliseum	8,000	Ric Flair (c) vs. Dusty Rhodes for the NWA World Heavyweight Championship

== Show results ==
=== Superstar Extravaganza ===
Superstar Extravaganza
- Promotion: NWA Pacific Northwest Wrestling (Don Owen Sports)
- Date: January 21, 1986
- City: Portland, Oregon
- Venue: Portland Memorial Coliseum
- Attendance: 8,000+

The PNW Superstar Extravaganza was the third of the three events. It took place on January 21, 1986, also at the Memorial Coliseum.

=== Results ===
No.	Results	Stipulations	Times
1	Scott Doring vs. Ole Olson ended in a draw	Singles match	—
2	Nick Kiniski defeated Timothy Flowers by disqualification	Singles match	—
3	Billy Two Eagles vs. Gary Royal ended in a draw	Singles match	—
4	Billy Jack Haynes and Brady Boone defeated Moondog Moretti and Karl Steiner	Tag Team match	—
5	Steve Pardee defeated Rip Oliver by disqualification	Singles match	—
6	Jerry Sampson defeated Chris Colt by disqualification	Singles match	—
7	Little Mr. T defeated Little Tokyo	Singles match	—
8	The Road Warriors and Magnum T. A. defeated Timothy Flowers and The Russians (Ivan Koloff and Nikita Koloff)	Six-Man Tag Team match	18:24
9	Tom Zenk defeated Bobby Jaggers (c)	Singles match for the NWA Pacific Northwest Heavyweight Championship	—
10	Ric Flair (c) defeated Dusty Rhodes by disqualification	Singles match for the NWA World Heavyweight Championship	28:53
(c) / – the champion(s) heading into the match
