= Matt Borne =

American professional wrestler (1957–2013)

Matt Osborne
- Osborne in 1999

Personal information
- Born: Matthew Wade Osborne; July 27, 1957 Charlotte, North Carolina, U.S.
- Died: June 28, 2013 (aged 55) Plano, Texas, U.S.
- Cause of death: Accidental drug overdose
- Family: Tony Borne (father); Buddy Rose (ex-brother-in-law)

Professional wrestling career
- Ring name(s): Big Bubba; Big Josh; Borne Again; Doink the Clown; Great Mustapha; Matt Borne; Reborne Again
- Billed height: 6 ft 0 in (183 cm)
- Billed weight: 241 lb (109 kg)
- Billed from: Ellwood City, Pennsylvania "Parts Unknown" (as Doink the Clown) "The Northwoods" (as Big Josh)
- Trained by: Tony Borne
- Debut: December 1978

Matthew Wade Osborne (July 27, 1957 – June 28, 2013), known professionally as Matt Borne, was an American professional wrestler. Osborne was a second generation wrestler, the son of Tony Borne, and is best known as being the first wrestler to portray the character of Doink the Clown.

== Professional wrestling career ==
=== National Wrestling Alliance (1978–1984) ===
Under the ring name Matt Borne, Osborne debuted in December 1978. He wrestled for various National Wrestling Alliance (NWA) territories, most prominently for Pacific Northwest Wrestling (PNW), where he was their heavyweight and four-time tag champion. Borne also would regularly referee matches while in Portland as that territory had only one primary referee, Sandy Barr, and wrestlers would fill in as a referee when they weren't working a match. In Mid Atlantic Championship Wrestling on June 6, 1980, he won his first championship, also the first of two tag titles he would hold with Buzz Sawyer. In Mid-South Wrestling, he allied with Ted DiBiase and Jim Duggan as a member of the Rat Pack, a heel stable, and won their tag title with DiBiase.

In April 1983, Borne returned to Georgia Championship Wrestling, where he was put into a tag team, "Destruction Inc.", with Arn Anderson, managed by Paul Ellering. The team were pushed strongly throughout mid-1983. In June 1983, Borne was abruptly fired from GCW due to legal issues, and the team immediately disbanded, with the newly-formed Road Warriors replacing them as the promotion's top team under Ellering.

=== World Wrestling Federation (1985–1986) ===
Borne made his World Wrestling Federation (WWF) debut on March 2, 1985, wrestling Rick McGraw to a time-limit draw. He suffered his first recorded loss on March 8 to David Sammartino. He was primarily a jobber, but occasionally defeated other jobbers at house shows. He made his televised debut for the WWF on the March 23 edition of All Star Wrestling, teaming with Frank Marconi in a losing effort against WWF Tag Team Champions Mike Rotundo and Barry Windham. Borne's most notable match during this run was a loss to Ricky "The Dragon" Steamboat at the inaugural WrestleMania pay-per-view in Madison Square Garden on March 31. He left the WWF following a loss to George Wells on April 29, 1986 due to drug issues.

=== World Class Championship Wrestling (1986–1989) ===
In May 1986, Borne joined World Class Championship Wrestling. That September, he reformed his tag team with Buzz Sawyer under the management of Percival Pringle III to win a one-day tournament to crown new WCWA World Tag Team Champions. Borne and Sawyer feuded with fellow Pringle protégé Dingo Warrior after falling out with him during a six-man tag team match, with Warrior turning babyface as a direct result of the incident.

=== United States Wrestling Association (1989–1991) ===
In 1989, World Class merged with the United States Wrestling Association (USWA). For the next two years, Borne won the USWA World Tag Team Championship twice with Jeff Jarrett and held the WCWA Texas Heavyweight Championship twice.

=== World Championship Wrestling (1991–1992) ===
In 1991, Osborne signed with World Championship Wrestling (WCW) and debuted as "Big Josh", an outdoorsman who danced with bears and was friends with Tommy Rich. He made his WCW pay-per-view debut on May 19 at SuperBrawl I, defeating Black Bart. In August, Big Josh won the WCW World Six-Man Tag Team Championship with Dustin Rhodes and Tom Zenk, which they held for three months. From January to February 1992, he also held the WCW United States Tag Team Championship with Ron Simmons. Borne made his final pay-per-view appearance for the company on May 17 at WrestleWar '92, defeating Richard Morton. He continued to make sporadic WCW TV appearances throughout the summer before leaving the company.

=== World Wrestling Federation (1992–1993) ===
Osborne returned to the WWF on September 21, 1992 at a WWF Superstars taping as Matt Borne, defeating Bill Jordan. He would shortly thereafter become Doink the Clown, in a villainous clown gimmick that would frequently pull tricks on wrestlers at ringside as well as fans. He made his in-ring televised debut on the January 31, 1993 edition of Wrestling Challenge, defeating Bob East. In March, he started feuding with Crush after attacking him with a prosthetic arm on an episode of Superstars, which resulted in a match at WrestleMania IX on April 4. Doink defeated Crush after another Doink (Steve Keirn) came out from under the ring and attacked Crush with another prosthetic arm.

In the spring, Doink was given the opportunity to enter the King of the Ring tournament, facing Mr. Perfect in the qualifying round. After two time-limit draws, Mr. Perfect defeated Doink in their third match on the May 24 episode of Monday Night Raw. At the titular event on June 13, Doink (or rather, two Doinks) distracted Crush, costing him his Intercontinental Championship match against Shawn Michaels. In the summer, Doink continued his feud with Crush and was successful in house show encounters against Marty Jannetty and the 1-2-3 Kid, despite occasionally losing to higher profile opponents such as Bret Hart or Tatanka. At SummerSlam on August 30, Jerry Lawler hired Doink to wrestle Hart as he feigned injury, with Hart winning by disqualification when Lawler interfered.

Several days later, Doink turned face by inciting a mocking chant from the fans directed at Lawler. On the September 13 episode of Raw, Doink poured a pail of water over Bobby Heenan, marking his face turn. In late November, Doink was given a present from Santa Claus in the form of a midget in the Doink costume, which he named Dink. Shortly after, however, Osborne was fired for re-occurring drug abuses. His final WWF TV appearance was on the December 27 episode of Raw. Osborne cited in a shoot interview that Bam Bam Bigelow did not like putting over Osborne, which led to Bigelow snitching on him for smoking weed in the hallway of his hotel and getting him fired from the WWF. Following his departure, Doink was played by Ray Licameli (also known as Ray Apollo).

=== Extreme Championship Wrestling (1994) ===
Borne next appeared as Doink in 1994 in Extreme Championship Wrestling (ECW) as 911's surprise opponent in the NWA World Title Tournament. After Doink lost a match to then-ECW World Heavyweight Champion Shane Douglas, Douglas criticized Vince McMahon for turning a talented wrestler like Borne into a comic relief character, and claimed that he knew how to bring out Borne's full potential. Borne then changed his ring name to Borne Again and continued wearing the clown suit, albeit without the wig, wearing a minimal amount of face paint, as well as growing out his hair and beard. After beating his opponents, he would make them dress in clown outfits. However, his tenure with the company was short-lived due to personal problems.

=== Late career (1994–2013) ===
After leaving ECW, Osborne wrestled on the independent circuit for several reunion shows and independent promotions under his Matt Borne ring name. He promoted the Ellwood City, Pennsylvania-based promotion United States Wrestling League (USWL) with his friend Frank Szabo. He also worked alongside Sandy Barr as a booker in Portland. In August 2005, at WrestleReunion II, Borne participated in an eight-man tag team match alongside Andrew Martin, Steve Corino and The Masked Superstar, losing to Dusty Rhodes, The Blue Meanie, Tom Prichard and D'Lo Brown. On December 10, 2007, at the suggestion of Ricky Steamboat, Osborne reprised the role of Doink at Raw's 15th Anniversary as he took part in a Legends Battle Royal.

In early 2010, Osborne reinvented the Doink character to resemble Heath Ledger's portrayal of The Joker in The Dark Knight, nicknaming the incarnation 'Reborne Again'. The new character debuted on March 27 for ISPW in New Jersey. On May 23, Doink the Clown, portrayed by Dusty Wolfe, interfered against Skandor Akbar and his men Dr. Knuckles and Rommel, causing them to lose the Wrecking Ball Wrestling tag titles. In retaliation, Akbar called on the original Doink (Matt Borne), and they were scheduled to meet on August 15. At that time, Wolfe no-showed the event to avoid Borne. On August 8, Borne won the Wrecking Ball Wrestling Championship. Osborne continued to compete on a semi-regular basis all over the United States for the last several years until a few days before his death on June 28, 2013.

== Death ==
Osborne, aged 55, was found dead by his girlfriend on June 28, 2013, in the Plano, Texas apartment he lived in. His death was acknowledged by WWE. Though no weapons were found near his body, and police said the death appeared accidental, they launched a precautionary homicide investigation. The cause of death was later determined to be an accidental overdose of morphine and hydrocodone. He also suffered from heart disease, which had been a contributing factor in his death.

In June 2015, a wrongful death lawsuit was filed against WWE, alleging that "WWE created a culture of violence and sacrificed Matt Osborne's brain for its own profit" which "led to further illnesses and injuries, including depression and drug abuse, which ultimately resulted in his untimely death." WWE attorney Jerry McDevitt said the suit was without merit and blamed the attorneys for taking advantage of the families involved. The suit was filed by the mother of two of Osborne's four children, and was litigated by attorney Konstantine Kyros, who has been involved in a number of other lawsuits against WWE. The lawsuit was dismissed by US District Judge Vanessa Lynne Bryant, who ruled that they failed to show that his death was linked to chronic traumatic encephalopathy.

== Other media ==
He was the focus of a fourth season episode of the docuseries Dark Side of the Ring.

== Championships and accomplishments ==
- International Wrestling Association
  - IWA United States Heavyweight Championship (1 time)
- Mid-Atlantic Championship Wrestling / World Championship Wrestling
  - NWA Mid-Atlantic Tag Team Championship (1 time) – with Buzz Sawyer
  - WCW United States Tag Team Championship (1 time) – with Ron Simmons
  - WCW World Six-Man Tag Team Championship (1 time) – with Dustin Rhodes and Tom Zenk
- Mid-South Wrestling Association
  - Mid-South Tag Team Championship (1 time) – with Ted DiBiase
- New England Pro Wrestling Hall of Fame
  - Class of 2014
- Pacific Northwest Wrestling / Championship Wrestling USA
  - Championship Wrestling International Alliance World Heavyweight Championship (1 time)
  - Championship Wrestling USA Television Championship (1 time)
  - NWA Pacific Northwest Heavyweight Championship (1 time)
  - NWA Pacific Northwest Tag Team Championship (4 times) – with Steve Regal (2) and Rip Oliver (2)
- Portland Wrestling
  - Portland Pacific Northwest Tag Team Championship (1 time) – with Brian Cox
- Pro Wrestling Illustrated
  - PWI ranked him #26 of the top 500 singles wrestlers in the PWI 500 in 1992
  - PWI ranked him #398 of the 500 best singles wrestlers during the PWI Years in 2003.
- Ring Around The Northwest Newsletter
  - Wrestler of the Year (1996)
  - Tag Team of the Year (1997) with Bruiser Brian
- Texas Wrestling Federation
  - TWF Heavyweight Championship (1 time)
- Texas Wrestling Hall of Fame
  - Class of 2011
- Ultimate Wrestling
  - UW Phantom Championship (1 time)
- United States Wrestling League
  - USWL Unified World Heavyweight Championship (1 time)
- World Class Wrestling Association
  - USWA World Tag Team Championship (2 times) – with Jeff Jarrett
  - WCWA Texas Heavyweight Championship (2 times)
  - WCWA World Tag Team Championship (2 times) – with Buzz Sawyer (1) and Jeff Jarrett (1)
- Wrecking Ball Wrestling
  - WBW Championship (1 time)
  - WBW Tag Team Championship (1 time) – with Lumberjack Tony Martin
  - Comeback of the Year (2011)
  - Superstar of the Year (2012)
