= Jaysin Strife =

American professional wrestler (1985–2022)

Personal information
- Born: Nathan Blodgett; August 14, 1985 Dubuque, Iowa, U.S.
- Died: December 29, 2022 (aged 37) Council Bluffs, Iowa, U.S.

Boxing career

Jaysin Strife (born Nathan Blodgett; August 14, 1985 – December 29, 2022) was an American professional wrestler who worked under the ring name of Jaysin Strife. Promotions Strife has competed in include National Wrestling Alliance (NWA), Pro Wrestling Phoenix (PWP), Magnum Pro Wrestling (MPW), 3XWrestling, and the International Wrestling Association (IWA).

== Professional wrestling career ==
Blodgett made his professional wrestling debut in 2005. He made an appearance on WWE Raw in 2014, and competed against Akira Tozawa on 205 Live. As an independent performer, he also wrestled for AEW Dark, Impact Wrestling, and other promotions.

Blodgett died on December 29, 2022, after an extended illness. His body was donated to medical research.
