= Road Dogg =

American professional wrestler (born 1969)

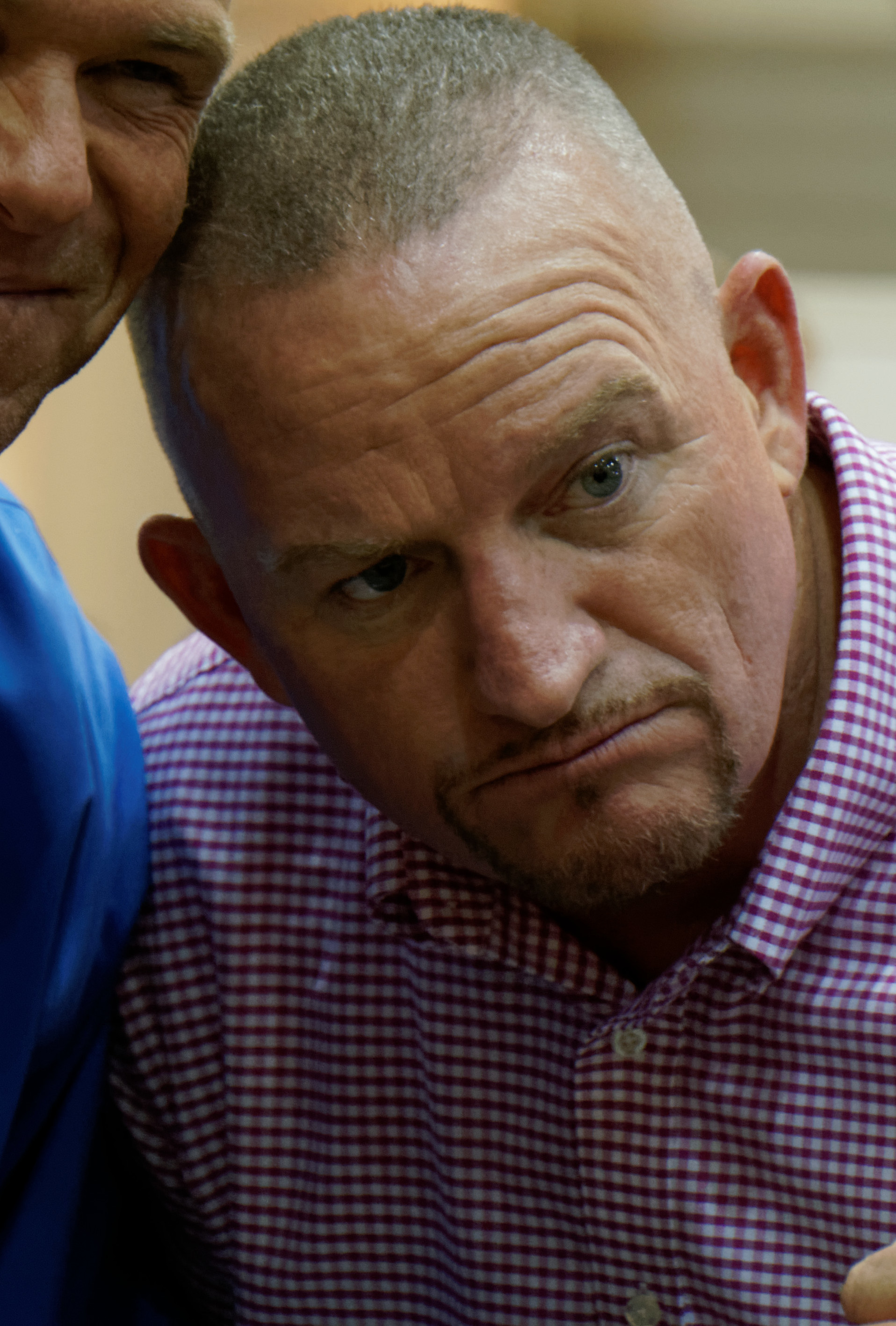
- James in 2014

Personal information
- Born: Brian Girard James; May 20, 1969 (age 57) Marietta, Georgia, U.S.
- Relatives: Scott Armstrong (brother); Brad Armstrong (brother); Steve Armstrong (brother)

Professional wrestling career
- Ring name(s): B.G. James; Brian Armstrong; Brian James; The Dark Secret; Jesse James; Jesse James Armstrong; Jesse Jammes; Road Dogg "Road Dogg" Jesse James; The Roadie
- Billed height: 6 ft 1 in (185 cm)
- Billed weight: 241 lb (109 kg)
- Billed from: Marietta, Georgia
- Trained by: Bob Armstrong; Brad Armstrong; Paul Orndorff
- Debut: December 1, 1986
- Retired: January 25, 2015
- Military service
- Allegiance: United States
- Branch: United States Marines Corps
- Service years: 1987–1994
- Rank: Platoon sergeant
- Conflicts: Gulf War

Brian Girard James (born May 20, 1969) is an American retired professional wrestler. He is signed to WWE under a Legends contract. James was best known for his initial tenure with World Wrestling Federation (WWF, now WWE) as The Roadie from 1994 to 1995 and as "Road Dogg" Jesse James from 1996 to 2001. He is also known for his appearances with Total Nonstop Action Wrestling (TNA) as B.G. James from 2002 to 2009, and has also made appearances for several other promotions.

James has held numerous championships in a career spanning more than three decades. In the WWF/E, he achieved mainstream notoriety as half of The New Age Outlaws (who became part of D-Generation X): he and partner Billy Gunn won the WWF World Tag Team Championship five times, and later held the WWE Tag Team Championship once. Additionally, James found success in singles competition, becoming a one-time Intercontinental Champion and a one-time WWF Hardcore Champion. Following his 2001 departure from the WWF, James found success as a tag team wrestler in TNA, where he was a two-time National Wrestling Alliance (NWA) NWA World Tag Team Champion with Konnan and Ron Killings as the 3 Live Kru. He was inducted into the WWE Hall of Fame (Class of 2019) as part of D-Generation X and was also the Senior Vice President of Live Events.

== Professional wrestling career ==
=== Early career (1986) ===
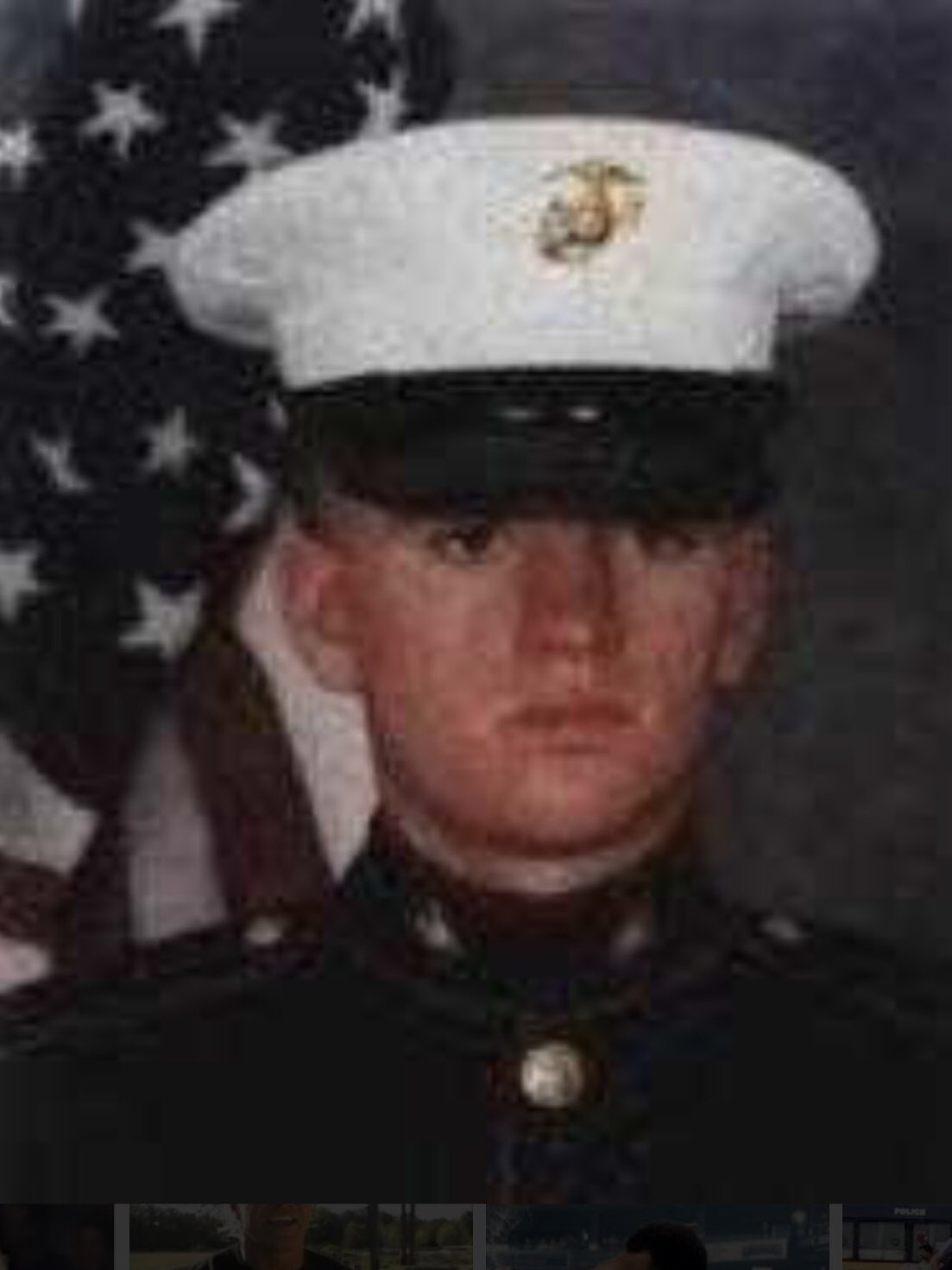
James during his time in the United States Marine Corps.

James, under the ring name Brian Armstrong, made his professional wrestling debut on December 1, 1986, where he defeated Kevin Sullivan in a match for NWA Southeast Championship Wrestling. Following this, James put his wrestling career on hold in order to enlist in the United States Marine Corps in 1987.

=== World Championship and Smoky Mountain Wrestling (1991–1995) ===
Brian was mentioned on WCW programming during the WrestleWar 91 PPV on February 24, 1991, when the commentary team mentioned that Brad's brother Brian was serving in Operation Desert Storm during a match between Brad and Bobby Eaton. Following his tour of duty, Brian wrestled his first match in five years and lost to Terrance Taylor on July 7, 1991, during the final night of World Championship Wrestling's The Great American Bash house show tour. After completing another tour of duty, James made his debut for Smoky Mountain Wrestling on November 20, 1992, under a mask as The Dark Secret, where he lost to Tracy Smothers. As The Dark Secret, James was relegated to jobbing, as he would lose continuously in both singles and tag team matches throughout the rest of 1992 and into 1993.

Following another tour of duty, James returned to SMW on July 2, 1993, where he lost to Bobby Blaze. On July 19, James, now using the Brian Armstrong ring name, defeated Killer Kyle in a dark match. Following this, James would alternate between the Brian Armstrong and The Dark Secret ring names, where he would find success in singles and tag team matches under the former and continue to job under the latter. In addition to SMW, James returned to WCW under his Brian Armstrong ring name on the November 30 episode of Saturday Night in a losing effort to Steve Austin.

Beginning in 1994, James wrestled more frequently for WCW, including a championship match against the World Television Champion Lord Steven Regal which he lost. On the March 5, 1994 edition of the WCW Power Hour, Armstrong lost to Terra Ryzing – who would go on to become James' DX stablemate Triple H – in the latter's debut match for the promotion. Brian wrestled primarily on television tapings, and began to team frequently with his brother Brad, albeit in losing efforts.

Meanwhile, his time in Smoky Mountain Wrestling was drawing to a close. Following a tag team match where he (as The Dark Secret) and Killer Kyle lost to The Rock 'n' Roll Express (Ricky Morton and Robert Gibson) on April 4, James left SMW and began competing solely for WCW as Brian Armstrong. However, he would find little success, as his only victories were in tag team dark matches where he teamed with his brother Brad while he, along with his brothers, were relegated to being jobbers on television, with the most notable example being a rematch with Lord Steven Regal for the World Television Championship on the August 10 episode of Saturday Night. Around that time, he would adopt his signature undercut braids.

On the November 14, 1994 edition of WCW Pro, Armstrong again lost to the future Triple H, who by that time had been repackaged as Jean-Paul Lévesque. Both men left the promotion before long. James wrestled his final match for WCW on the February 17, 1995 episode of WorldWide, as he and his brothers Brad and Scott lost a six-man tag team match to The Three Faces of Fear (Kevin Sullivan, The Butcher, and Avalanche).

=== World Wrestling Federation (1994–1995; 1996–2001) ===
==== Alliance with Jeff Jarrett (1994–1995) ====
After defeating Barry Hardy in a dark match on the August 16, 1994 episode of WWF Wrestling Challenge, James signed with the World Wrestling Federation towards the end of 1994. He was billed as The Roadie, an assistant to "Double J" Jeff Jarrett, a would-be country singer. He wrestled on several pay-per-views and television shows, but most of his first WWF tenure was spent accompanying Jarrett and interfering in his matches. He fought against Razor Ramon and The 1-2-3 Kid. He participated in the King of the Ring 1995 tournament defeating Doink the Clown, and Bob Holly until losing to Savio Vega in the semi-finals. Roadie defeated The 1-2-3 Kid at In Your House 2: The Lumberjacks. In early 1995, Jarrett released the song "With My Baby Tonight", which Jarrett claimed he had sung himself. The planned angle was to reveal that it was The Roadie, not Jarrett, who had really performed the vocals on this song, sparking a feud between the two wrestlers. Before this revelation could take place, James and Jarrett suddenly left the WWF following the second In Your House 2 pay-per-view on July 23, 1995.

After leaving the WWF, James joined the United States Wrestling Association under the ring name Jesse James Armstrong alongside Jarrett, where he won its Memphis Wrestling Southern Heavyweight Championship, USWA Television Championship, and USWA World Tag Team Championship before losing a Loser Leaves Town match to Jarrett.

==== Jesse James- The Real Double J (1996–1997) ====
James, without Jarrett, returned to the WWF in October 1996 under the ring name Jesse James, where he revealed himself as "The Real Double J" and the true singer of "With My Baby Tonight". He languished as an undercard singles wrestler until beginning a feud with The Honky Tonk Man. After denying Honky Tonk Man's offer at becoming his manager by destroying his guitar, James also began feuding with Honky Tonk Man's protégé Rockabilly. After trading wins against each other on television and pay-per-view, James, now referring to himself as "The Road Dogg" Jesse James, originally spelled "Jammes" as a play on the way Jarrett spelled his name. (J E double S E, J A double M E S) suggested to Rockabilly that they form a tag team in order to end their unsuccessful runs as singles competitors.

==== The New Age Outlaws and D-Generation X (1997–2000) ====
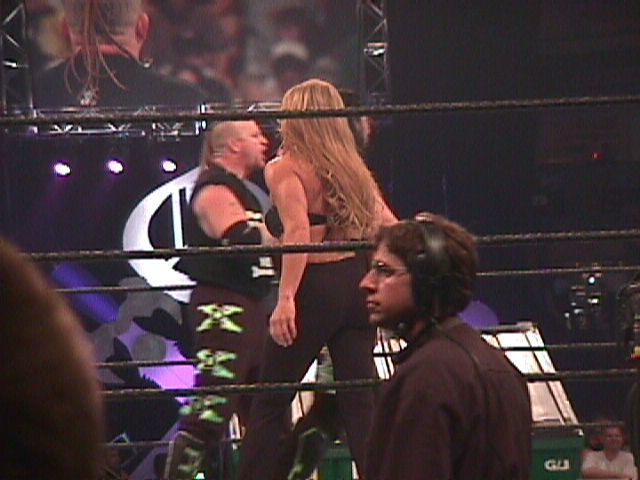
Road Dogg and Tori in the ring during the King of the Ring pay-per-view in 2000.

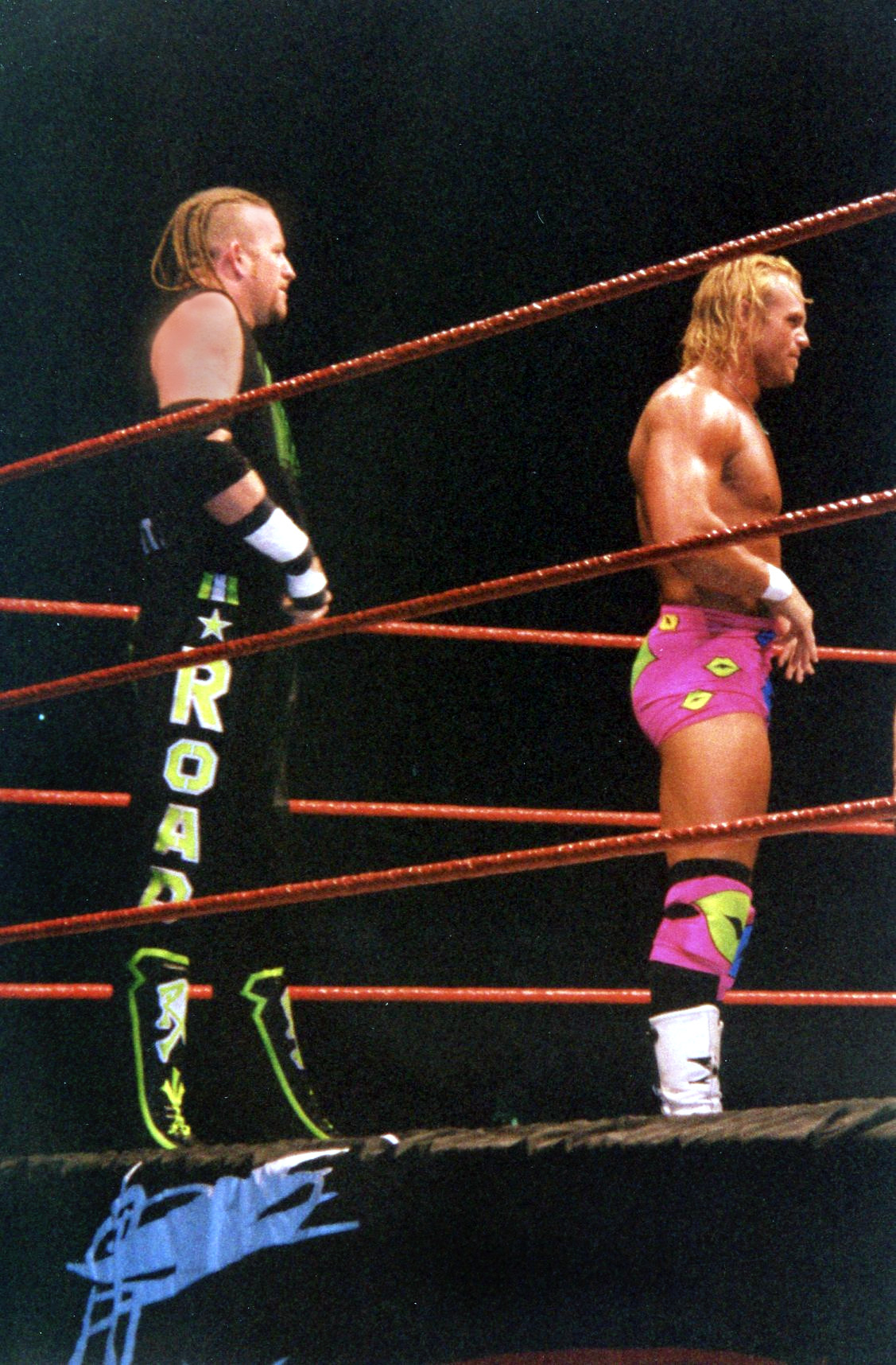
The New Age Outlaws ("The Road Dogg" Jesse James (left) and "Badd Ass" Billy Gunn) in 1999.

A change in creative direction in the WWF in late 1997 led Rockabilly to accept James' offer after subsequently attacking Honky Tonk Man with his own guitar to cement their alliance. Soon after, Rockabilly reverted to his Billy Gunn ring name and adopted the nickname "Badd Ass", while Road Dogg began to grow out and braid his hair, resurrecting his old look from his days in WCW. In addition to these esthetic changes, their mannerisms became consistently more controversial and antisocial, with the team ultimately becoming known as the New Age Outlaws following their victory over The Legion of Doom for their first WWF Tag Team Championship. The Outlaws would continue to feud with the Legion of Doom and later the short-lived tag team of Cactus Jack and Chainsaw Charlie before joining D-Generation X the night after WrestleMania XIV.

The Outlaws amassed five WWF Tag Team Championship reigns and managed to become singles champions while still together, with Road Dogg and Gunn each winning the Hardcore Championship once in 1998 and 1999, respectively, while Road Dogg would also go on to win the Intercontinental Championship in 1999. The team came to an end when Gunn was legitimately injured in early 2000 and, to explain the absence needed for his recovery, Gunn was expelled from DX due to losing his temper. James then teamed with fellow DX member X-Pac throughout the summer of 2000, but failed to regain any championship success. The team eventually split, with Road Dogg and X-Pac subsequently feuding with each other before the entirety of DX fell apart.

==== Teaming with K-Kwik (2000–2001) ====
Road Dogg then formed a tag team with newcomer K-Kwik in November 2000, considering themselves as rappers and performing a song called "Gettin' Rowdy" as they approached the ring. At Survivor Series, they teamed with former DX members Billy Gunn, and Chyna to face The Radicalz in a Survivor Series match. Road Dogg was eliminated by Perry Saturn and the Radicalz went on to win the match. At Armageddon, K-Kwik and Road Dogg took part in a four-way tag team match for the Tag Team Championship, which was won by Edge and Christian.He competed in his last televised match on December 23 (taped December 18) against Lo Down (Chaz and D'Lo Brown) on Jakked. He was then indefinitely suspended, and later released from his contract in January 2001, due to personal problems. On March 26, 2001, James arrived at the final WCW Monday Nitro taping in Panama City, Florida, in order to negotiate a return to World Championship Wrestling, only to find out that the promotion had been purchased by the WWF, thus ruling out both companies as employment options.

=== Independent circuit (2001–2002) ===
James would go on work the independent circuit after being fired from WWF, often no-showing scheduled appearances as a result of substance-abuse issues he was battling with at the time. On May 26, 2001, James appeared on an indy show at a high school in Conway, South Carolina where he was supposed to wrestle against The Barbarian for the main event. During that event, James was signing autographs and taking Polaroids during intermission, and became belligerent after being asked to leave the gymnasium when the intermission ended and matches were going on. James became irritated, started swearing and refused to leave. Police came and arrested him. He was charged for disorderly conduct.

He also worked for IWA Mid-South. Then James worked for the short-lived World Wrestling All-Stars (WWA) promotion in Australia with former WWF and WCW wrestlers. On October 23, 2001, he defeated former WWF colleague and tag team partner Jeff Jarrett for the vacant WWA World Heavyweight Champion where he was the inaugural champion. Three days later, the title was vacated to be made available for a tournament to be held at the inaugural WWA Pay-Per-View event, The Inception. There, Road Dogg defeated Konnan in a Dog Collar Match in the quarter-finals, and then beat Lenny & Lodi in a Three Way Dance in the semi-finals (Lenny & Lodi replaced the injured Juventud Guerrera), advancing to the finals of the tournament where he lost to Jeff Jarrett in a Steel Cage Match. He continued feuding with Jarrett and Scott Steiner. Road Dogg was heavily advertised for the WWA's second Pay-Per-View, The Revolution, but did not appear on the show and never returned to the WWA.

=== Total Nonstop Action Wrestling (2002–2009) ===
==== 3 Live Kru (2002–2005) ====
James debuted for the Total Nonstop Action Wrestling promotion on September 18, 2002, wrestling as B.G. James, as the Road Dogg gimmick was owned by WWE. He was initially a Babyface, aligned with Scott Hall and Syxx-Pac before turning heel in December 2002 and becoming one of the founding members of Vince Russo's Sports Entertainment Xtreme faction.

In 2003, James formed the stable known as the 3 Live Kru alongside Konnan and Ron Killings. The stable was popular from the outset and, as a nod to James' and Killings' brief tag team in the World Wrestling Federation, they sang their own entrance music as they approached the ring. In addition to popularity, the Kru found championship success as well, as Killings won his second and final NWA World Heavyweight Championship as a member while all three men held the NWA World Tag Team Championship twice under the Freebird Rule.

Tension arose when James' former partner Billy Gunn joined TNA as The New Age Outlaw (later shortened to The Outlaw) in 2005. The Outlaw repeatedly courted James, seeking to split the Kru and recreate the New Age Outlaws. When The Outlaw began feuding with the Kru, James repeatedly found his loyalties divided, unwilling to fight either his former or current tag team partners. For a time, James stopped appearing with the Kru but did not align himself with The Outlaw, who had by then changed his name to Kip James as a "tribute" to James' father. At Sacrifice, he reasserted his allegiance with 3 Live Kru as the special guest referee in a match between the other members of 3LK and the team of Kip James and Monty Brown. Kip tried to warm up to 3LK again in the lead-up to Bound for Glory by saving James several times from Team Canada. At Bound for Glory, he offered his protective services to them against Team Canada to neutralize Scott D'Amore. When they lost, Kip came down to the ring, appearing ready to hit Konnan with a steel chair since he originally vetoed Kip's offer. Kip instead saved Konnan from Team Canada, thus proving his original intentions.

On the November 26 episode of Impact!, James brought Kip and the 3LK to the ring and asked Killings and Konnan to give Kip a yes/no vote to be accepted into the group. After James got heated with Konnan, both gave Kip yes votes and the 4 Live Kru was born. The 4 Live Kru was short lived as Konnan, still apparently upset at Kip's induction into the Kru, hit both James and Kip over the head with a steel chair at Turning Point. Konnan, still wanting Killings to be his "family", tried talking with Killings. Killings told Konnan that he was done with the Kru and wanted to leave it all behind him.

==== James Gang/Voodoo Kin Mafia (2006–2008) ====
After the incident, James and Kip regrouped, reformed their old tag team as The James Gang, and feuded with Konnan's new stable, The Latin American Xchange (LAX), which he formed with Homicide and Apolo. Apolo was sent home from Against All Odds after complaining about being used as a jobber and was quickly replaced by a relative unknown named Machete.

On a subsequent edition of Impact!, James' real life father "Bullet" Bob Armstrong informed The James Gang that he was sick of the shenanigans of LAX and how they always used strength in numbers to their advantage. He informed them that he was going to see Larry Zbyszko to have himself added to the Destination X match as their partner, effectively making it a three-man tag team. "Bullet" was in fact added to the team and they won the match at Destination X. The following month, an arm wrestling match was booked between Armstrong and Konnan, where the losing team would get hit ten times with a leather whip. Armstrong prevailed with the victory, resulting in LAX being whipped several times upon trying to scramble out of the cage for survival.

Following their feud with LAX, James and Kip began feuding with Team 3D. The two teams cut promos arguing over their long-term histories with past promotions such as World Wrestling Entertainment and Extreme Championship Wrestling. The rivalry came to a head at Sacrifice when The James Gang beat Team 3D using a lead pipe. The James Gang and Team 3D feuded throughout the summer. They were scheduled for a number one contendership match at Hard Justice but, due to a fire, the match was canceled. The match was rescheduled for Impact!, which the Gang lost.

On the November 2, 2006 edition of Impact!, Kip and James announced that they were going to quit TNA. While attempting to speak about it, their microphones were cut off. When the show returned, the announcers speculated that they may have been frustrated due to the influx of new talent entering TNA. It was later reported that the segment was a worked shoot that Vince Russo had written in order to renew interest upon their eventual return.

On the November 16 airing of Impact!, The James Gang announced that they would now be known as Voodoo Kin Mafia (VKM) (a pun on the name Vincent Kennedy McMahon). They spent their airtime bashing McMahon and both members of D-Generation X, using their real names: Paul Levesque and Michael Hickenbottom. After calling Triple H "Triple Hollywood" and Shawn Michaels "Shawn Kiss-My-Bottom", VKM claimed they were declaring war on DX and Vincent Kennedy McMahon. On the November 23 airing of Impact!, they drove around searching for their targets, but they ended up arriving at a Target store. At the end of the episode, VKM argued, and Kip pointed straight ahead to the WWE World Headquarters, which prompted James to respond, "We're back!" In 2006, as acknowledged by TNA's website, VKM accepted The Hardys' open challenge to a match at December to Dismember. WWE never acknowledged their acceptance, however. Over the following weeks, VKM aired several more videos bashing DX and Vince McMahon. They also made a $1 million challenge to DX as announced on the TNA website. They declared "victory" at Final Resolution, after receiving no answer from WWE. In early 2007, however, James said in a shoot interview along with his tag team partner Kip that he would jump back to WWE if he could get out of his TNA contract and get a WWE offer.

On August 4, James returned to the Boston-based Millennium Wrestling Federation's Soul Survivor IV wrestling event and fanfest. James worked for the promotion when it opened in 2001, but no-showed a benefit for Superstar Billy Graham in 2002 due to his drug and personal issues. MWF subsequently brought the legitimate situation into a storyline. Despite this, James teamed with Beau Douglas to win the promotion's Tag Team Championship from the Canadian Superstars (J-Busta and Dave Cole). During a pre-event question and answer session, James went into his hatred of Jim Ross and his feelings that WWE ruins families and lives. James and Douglas lost the title back to the Canadians on October 27, 2007, at a Special Olympics fundraiser in Salem, Massachusetts. After five years of bad blood, James made peace with the MWF's promoter Dan Mirade for sabotaging the Graham benefit and agreed to return in the future.

At Turning Point, James won one of the cases in the Feast or Fired match, which was later revealed to contain a contract for a TNA World Tag Team Championship match. Instead of teaming with Kip, he chose his father "Bullet" Bob Armstrong to be his tag team partner. B.G. and Bullet Bob lost their title match against A.J. Styles and Tomko in the opening match of Against All Odds. He and Kip had turned face but on the February 21, 2008 edition of Impact!, Kip turned on James and Armstrong by hitting them both with a crutch, turning heel in the process. At Lockdown, he finally defeated Kip in a six-sides of steel match.

==== Sporadic appearances and departure (2008–2009) ====
At Final Resolution, James returned to TNA television for the first time in months and participated in the Feast or Fired Match, which was won by Curry Man, Homicide, Hernandez, and Jay Lethal. James was also seen on Impact! two weeks later as he was trying to hold back Jeff Jarrett from fighting Kurt Angle. The week afterwards, he was punched by Angle while he and Jarrett were fighting. On the January 8, 2009 edition of Impact!, James faced off against Angle, but lost via submission due to Angle's ankle lock.

On September 15, 2009, James was released from his TNA contract.

=== Return to independent circuit (2009–2011) ===
Upon leaving TNA, James returned to the independent circuit and resumed using his Jesse James ring name. On January 30, 2010, he teamed with Dysfunction to defeat Mason Quinn and J-Ca$h, who substituted for Quinn's tag team partner Dave Demone, to win the All-Star Championship Wrestling Tag Team Championship for the first time. On May 1, James lost his half of the title when Dysfunction picked Quinn as his new partner when Dysfunction and Quinn scored a double pin against each other during a title defense. On April 19, James resumed using his Road Dogg name and reformed the New Age Outlaws with Billy Gunn to compete in the Canadian Wrestling's Elite promotion.

On May 28, James appeared at One Pro Wrestling's event The Last Stand, where he teamed with Kevin Nash in an unsuccessful attempt at winning the Tag Team Championship.

=== Return to WWE (2011–present) ===
==== Sporadic appearances (2011–2012) ====
On April 2, 2011, James returned to WWE for the first time in over a decade to induct his father "Bullet" Bob Armstrong into the company's Hall of Fame. Several months later, James announced on October 11 via his Facebook account that he re-signed with WWE as a producer, and would return to the company in his new role on October 23 at the Vengeance pay-per-view. After a ten-year-long absence, James returned to WWE television on the December 12 episode of Raw under his Road Dogg ring name to present CM Punk with the Slammy Award for "Pipe Bomb" of the Year.

On January 29, 2012, Road Dogg entered the Royal Rumble match as the twenty-third entrant and lasted nearly five minutes before being eliminated by Wade Barrett. Following this, he began hosting the WWE.com and YouTube web series Are You Serious? alongside Josh Mathews. On July 23, Road Dogg reunited with Billy Gunn, Sean Waltman, Shawn Michaels and Triple H to reform D-Generation X for one night only on the 1000th episode of Raw. On the December 17 episode of Raw, he and Billy Gunn appeared together as the New Age Outlaws and presented the Slammy Award for Comeback of the Year to Jerry Lawler.

==== New Age Outlaws reunion (2013–2014) ====
On the March 4, 2013 episode of Raw, Road Dogg and Billy Gunn made their in-ring return as the New Age Outlaws with a victory over Primo and Epico. A week later, the New Age Outlaws competed against Team Rhodes Scholars, but the match was rendered a no contest after Brock Lesnar interrupted and performed an F-5 to both Outlaws as part of his ongoing feud with Triple H. On the December 9 episode of Raw, the New Age Outlaws appeared to present the Slammy Award for LOL Moment of the Year.

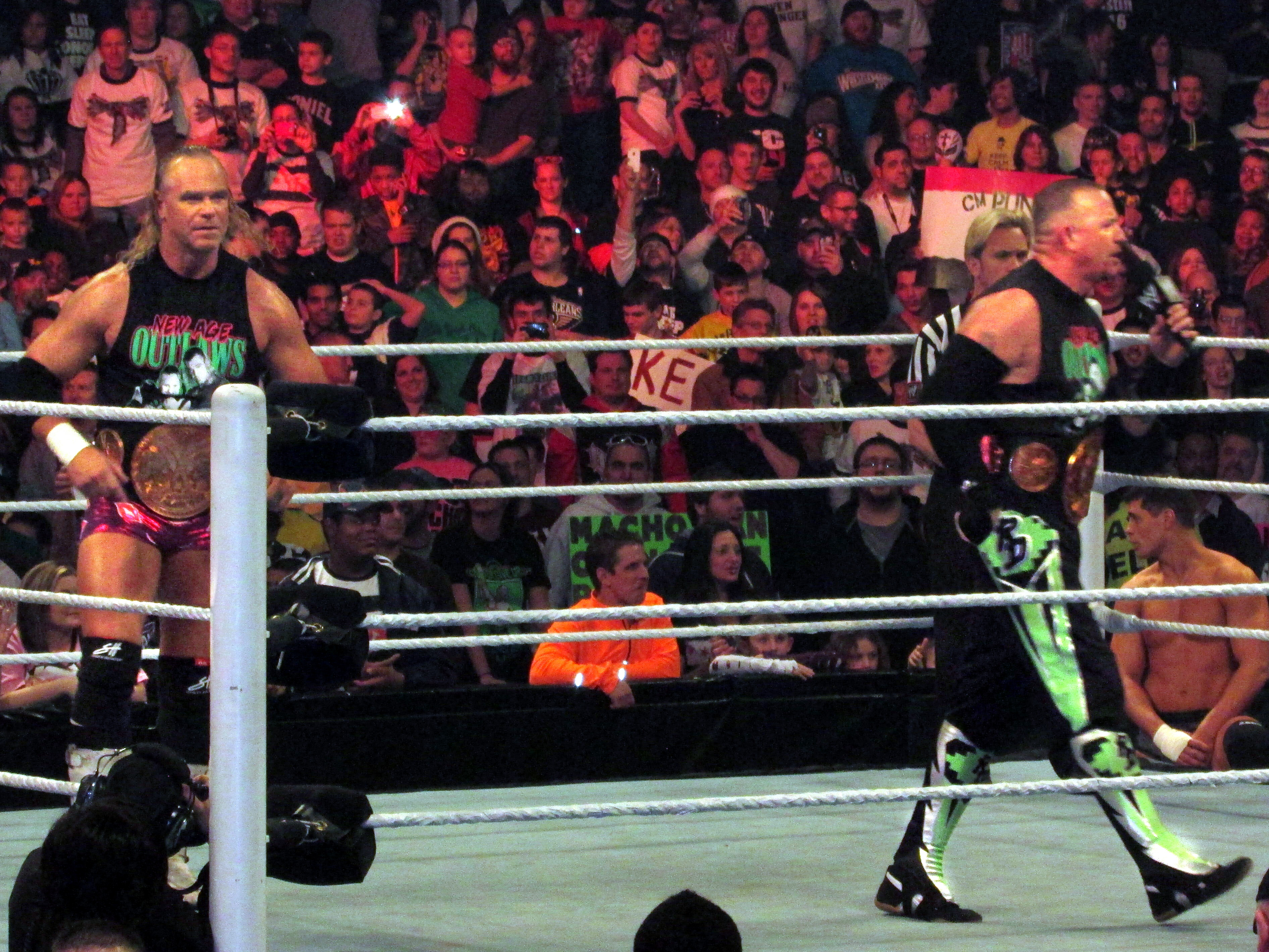
The New Age Outlaws as the WWE Tag Team Champions in 2014.

On the January 6, 2014 episode of Raw, the New Age Outlaws saved CM Punk from an assault by The Shield and later stood in Punk's corner during his match against Roman Reigns. Later that week on SmackDown, they teamed alongside Punk to face The Shield in a six-man tag team match, although they were defeated after Gunn was pinned by Reigns. On the January 13 episode of Raw, the New Age Outlaws and Punk faced The Shield in a rematch before abandoning Punk as he was about to tag them, turning both Outlaws heel in the process for the first time in over a decade. Later that week on SmackDown, the New Age Outlaws defeated the WWE Tag Team Champions Cody Rhodes and Goldust in a non-title match. On January 26 at the Royal Rumble kickoff show, the New Age Outlaws defeated Rhodes and Goldust to win their first WWE Tag Team Championship and sixth tag team title in WWE overall. They held the title until the March 3 episode of Raw, where they were defeated by The Usos. After losing the title, the Outlaws allied with Kane as part of The Authority to face The Shield at WrestleMania XXX, but they were defeated.

==== Backstage roles (2014–present) ====
Following WrestleMania XXX, James resumed his role as a producer while Gunn resumed his role as a trainer in NXT. On the January 19, 2015 episode of Raw, the New Age Outlaws returned alongside The Acolytes Protection Agency and the New World Order to confront and ultimately drive off The Ascension after they had been disrespecting tag teams from the past. Six days later, the Outlaws challenged The Ascension at the Royal Rumble, but were defeated. at WrestleMania 31, Road Dogg and the rest of D-Generation X (X-Pac and Billy Gunn) did a run in during Triple H's match against Sting which resulted in a brawl with the NWO (Hogan, Hall and Nash) at ringside. In December 2016 it was reported that James was going to be working on the writing team on SmackDown, and would be groomed for a bigger position. This led to James working as a producer and writer on SmackDown. He would later be promoted to one of the lead writers.

In January 2018, James made a one night return to Raw 25 Years, as part of the D-Generation X reunion. Later on at the show, they celebrated with the Bálor Club, after attacking The Revival. James would later appear in the 2018 WWE Hall of Fame ceremony to induct Jeff Jarrett. On the January 28, 2019 episode of Raw, Road Dogg made a surprise appearance, where he joined Jeff Jarrett in interrupting Elias, and the two sang "With My Baby Tonight" until they were both attacked by Elias, with both Road Dogg and Jarrett being smashed with a guitar. On the February 4, 2019 edition of Raw, he was in Jarrett's corner for his first match in WWE for 19 years against Elias. After Elias won the match, he attacked him from behind to set up a guitar shot from Jarrett. On April 7, 2019, Dogg was inducted in the WWE Hall of Fame as part of D-Generation X.

After WrestleMania 35, it was reported Dogg resigned as head writer of SmackDown Live. It was later clarified that James will remain with the company and is currently seen as a "utility player". From May 2019 to January 2022, he held a position at the WWE Performance Center in which he taught classes on in-ring promos and character development. He was released by WWE in January 2022, but was rehired as Senior Vice President of Live Events in August 2022, replacing Jeff Jarrett.

On January 23, 2023, Road Dogg, along with D-Generation X and Kurt Angle, made an appearance at Raw's 30th anniversary, Raw is XXX. They were interrupted by Imperium during their reunion. Beginning with the episode broadcast on February 1, 2024, Road Dogg served as color commentator on WWE Main Event, under his birth name of Brian James. In February 2025, it was reported that James was named a co-head writer of SmackDown. In March 2026, James exited his creative role with WWE although he remains with the company under a Legends contract.

== Personal life ==
James is a second-generation wrestler and the youngest brother of the Armstrong wrestling family: his father, Bob, wrestled, as did his brothers Scott, Brad, and Steve. Scott worked at WWE as a referee.

Like his father, James served in the United States Marine Corps. His tenure lasted from 1987 to 1993 and he fought in Operation Desert Storm in 1991, where he was a platoon sergeant in command of thirty-three Marines. James is married to Tracy James, with three children and a grandchild.

James is a longtime Pittsburgh Steelers fan and owns a jersey of former tight end Jesse James.

James admits to having had problems with drugs and alcohol throughout his life. He began taking painkillers during his time in D-Generation X. After being suspended and then released from the WWF, he successfully underwent rehabilitation. In the second season of WWE Unreal, he stated that he is now sober.

On March 26, 2021, after returning from Orlando, James suffered an apparent heart attack and was hospitalized. He saw his kidney specialist and had a stress test done and had also been taking medications for high blood pressure.

== Filmography ==
Film
Year	Title	Role	Notes
2003	Head of State	BG James	
2010	The Other Guys	BG James	(uncredited)

== Championships and accomplishments ==
- All-Star Championship Wrestling
  - ACW Tag Team Championship (1 time) – with Dysfunction
- Catch Wrestling Association
  - CWA World Tag Team Championship (1 time) – with Cannonball Grizzly
- Coastal Carolina Wrestling Alliance/Carolina Wrestling Federation
  - CCWA/CWF World Heavyweight Championship (1 time)
- Freedom Pro Wrestling
  - FPW Tag Team Championship (1 time) – with Billy Gunn
- Maryland Championship Wrestling
  - MCW Tag Team Championship (1 time) – with Kip James
- Millennium Wrestling Federation
  - MWF Tag Team Championship (1 time) – with Beau Douglas
- NWA Wrestle Birmingham
  - NWA Alabama Heavyweight Championship (2 times)
- Pro Wrestling Illustrated
  - Tag Team of the Year (1998) with Billy Gunn
  - PWI ranked him #46 of the best 500 singles wrestlers in the PWI 500 in 1999
  - PWI ranked him #43 of the best 100 tag teams of the "PWI Years" in 2003 with Billy Gunn
  - PWI ranked him #183 of the 500 best singles wrestlers during the "PWI Years" in 2003.
- Total Nonstop Action Wrestling
  - NWA World Tag Team Championship (2 times)^{1} – with Ron Killings and Konnan
  - Gauntlet for the Gold (2003 – Tag Team) – Ron Killings
  - Feast or Fired (2007 – World Tag Team Championship contract)
- TWA Powerhouse
  - TWA Tag Team Championship (1 time) – with Billy Gunn
- United States Wrestling Association
  - USWA Heavyweight Championship (1 time)
  - USWA Television Championship (2 times)
  - USWA World Tag Team Championship (2 times) – with Tracy Smothers
- World Wrestling All-Stars
  - WWA World Heavyweight Championship (1 time)
  - London Rumble (2001)
  - Manchester Rumble (2001)
- World Wrestling Federation / WWE
  - WWF Hardcore Championship (1 time)
  - WWF Intercontinental Championship (1 time)
  - WWF Tag Team Championship (5 times) – with Billy Gunn
  - WWE Tag Team Championship (1 time) – with Billy Gunn
  - WWE Hall of Fame (Class of 2019) – as a member of D-Generation X
- Wrestle Birmingham
  - Wrestle Birmingham Heavyweight Championship (2 times)
- Wrestling Observer Newsletter
  - Worst Gimmick (1996) as The Real Double J

^{1}James defended the championship with either Konnan or Killings under the Freebird Rule.
