= Colonel DeBeers =

American professional wrestler (1945–2025)

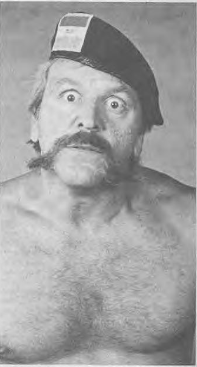
- Colonel DeBeers, c. 1987

Personal information
- Born: Edward Wiskoski; January 10, 1945 St. Joseph, Missouri, U.S.
- Died: January 22, 2025 (aged 80)
- Education: Northwest Missouri State University

Professional wrestling career
- Ring name(s): Colonel DeBeers; Dereck Draper; Mega Maharishi Imed; The Polish Prince; The General
- Billed height: 6 ft 4 in (193 cm)
- Billed weight: 275 lb (125 kg)
- Billed from: Buffalo, New York (as Ed Wiskowski); Johannesburg, South Africa (as Colonel DeBeers); Poland (Polish Prince)
- Debut: 1972
- Retired: 2005

Edward Wiskoski (also Wiskowski) (January 10, 1945 – January 22, 2025) was an American professional wrestler. He was best known for his appearances in the American Wrestling Association (AWA) under the ring name Colonel DeBeers from 1985 to 1990, as well as his work in the Pacific Northwestern National Wrestling Alliance (NWA) territories.

== Early life ==
Wiskoski was born in St. Joseph, Missouri, in 1945, to immigrant parents from Poland. He stated his parents, who spoke limited English, forbade him from learning the Polish language in the hopes he would better assimilate, and that members of his family had anglicized their surname to "Wilkins". He played football at Central High School and was the first member of his family to graduate from college, graduating from Northwest Missouri State University, where he earned Mid-America Intercollegiate Athletics Association honours.

== Professional wrestling career ==
=== Early career (1972–1985) ===
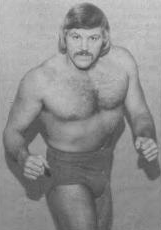
Wiskowski, c. 1981

After being trained by Harley Race and Lord Littlebrook, Wiskoski debuted under his real name in 1972, and was billed as "The Polish Prince". Wiskoski primarily wrestled in the Portland, Oregon area during his career. His teaming with "Playboy" Buddy Rose was famous across the West Coast, holding the Pacific Northwest Tag Team titles on multiple occasions, and the NWA World Tag Team titles (San Francisco version). Wiskoski was also the United States Heavyweight champion and Pacific Northwest Heavyweight champion.

He held the Central States Heavyweight title in 1975 and regularly visited Germany and Austria in the late 1970s and early 1980s for the season of tournaments run by the IBV (the future CWA) and its older rival, the VDB. He worked as a heel for Leroy McGuirk in the Tulsa, Oklahoma area in the early 1980s. He was known as "Easy" Ed Wiskoski and was managed by Skandor Akbar. They feuded with Tommy Gilbert and his son, Eddie Gilbert. He also wrestled a few matches in the WWF as the Polish Prince in 1983, managed by Fred Blassie.

During one of his many tours of the Pacific Northwest territory (where he eventually retired), Wiskoski took up the gimmick of Mega Maharishi Imed (the last name being pronounced 'Ahmed', the joke being that it is 'I'm Ed'). This character played upon potentially the hottest topic in the state of Oregon in the early to mid-1980s, that of Bhagwan Shree Rajneesh and his group of followers essentially raising their own city in Eastern Oregon, outside the town of Antelope, and ending with the 1984 Rajneeshee bioterror attack on the small town of The Dalles, Oregon, causing the sickening of about 750 people from salmonella poisoning, though no deaths. Wiskoski played the role to the hilt, growing out his facial hair, donning red robes and a stocking cap, much like the Bhagwan himself. During this time he managed Kendo Nagasaki.

=== American Wrestling Association (1985–1991) ===
Wiskoski was best known as Colonel DeBeers in the American Wrestling Association (AWA) from 1985 until the organization stopped promoting in late 1990. His interviews and persona were based on a pro-Apartheid, white supremacist veteran of the Bush War, and he played on the fragile race relations and political climate of South Africa at the time. He was billed as being from Cape Town, South Africa, though he bore no South African accent whatsoever. It was never directly mentioned, but his name was meant to link his status and wealth to the South Africa-based diamond mining and trading corporation the DeBeers Group. DeBeers also wrestled in Herb Abrams' Universal Wrestling Federation and various promotions across the West Coast.

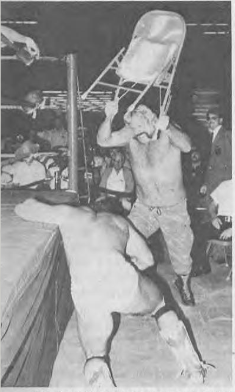
DeBeers attacking Scott Hall with a chair, c. 1986

During his stint in the AWA he feuded with "Big" Scott Hall and "Superfly" Jimmy Snuka in 1986, Sgt. Slaughter in 1988, briefly with Derrick Dukes in 1989, and jobber Jake Milliman throughout 1990. DeBeers feud with Snuka was notorious in that, even in an industry known for characters based on racial stereotypes, DeBeers's overt racism was still shocking. DeBeers essentially refused to wrestle Snuka because he was not white. After a series of standoffs between the two, the feud was magnified after an injury angle where DeBeers interfered in a match with Snuka, throwing him off the top rope to the floor and delivering several piledrivers on the floor, resulting in a bloody and battered Snuka being wheeled off on a stretcher. This led to a series of high-profile matches with Snuka.

DeBeers and Milliman competed in, quite possibly, one of the most infamous matches in the history of wrestling while in the AWA. In the company's dying months, the AWA created the Team Challenge Series (TCS) to try to attract more viewers. One of the matches in the TCS pitted DeBeers and Milliman in the Great American Turkey Hunt, a match where the object was to be the first to pull an uncooked turkey off of a pole tied to one corner of the ring. DeBeers was the first to grab the turkey, although the referee had been knocked out. Milliman pulled a fast one and stole the turkey from DeBeers just before the referee got back up, and was awarded the victory. Also in the AWA in 1988, DeBeers was briefly managed by Diamond Dallas Page, the leader of the Diamond Exchange stable, and his Diamond Dolls. During that short time, he would try to force his opponent to leave on a stretcher.

=== Later career (1991–2005) ===
While in Herb Abrams' UWF, DeBeers became involved in more controversy based on race, this time involving referee Larry Sampson, an African-American. After a match with Louie Spicolli, DeBeers attempted to attack Sampson before Iceman Parsons came to the save and became involved in a short feud with DeBeers. He also demanded that Sampson be replaced before his match with Billy Jack Haynes stating "I will not have a black man refereeing my matches". Despite Haynes' attempts to have Sampson reinstated DeBeers' request was granted and he was replaced by Jesse Hernandez. After a separate match with Haynes, DeBeers attacked Sampson from behind and hit him with a DDT. DeBeers was to be suspended for 180 days for his actions but Sampson refused to sign the contract initiating it and instead wanted to sign a contract that allowed him to referee a match involving DeBeers. During the 1990s, DeBeers promoted Aryan Nations and Richard Butler's Church of Jesus Christ–Christian during his performances.

On January 29, 2005, DeBeers wrestled his last match at WrestleReunion teaming with his former tag partner Buddy Rose and Bob Orton Jr. as they lost to Roddy Piper, Jimmy Snuka and Jimmy Valiant in Tampa Bay, Florida.

== Later life and death ==
Wiskoski and Rose ran a wrestling school in Portland, Oregon from 2001 until 2006. One of their students received a tryout from WWE in May 2006, Caden Mathews, who wrestled Finlay on an edition of SmackDown! that took place in Portland in May 2006.

Wiskoski retired in Arizona. He died on January 22, 2025, at the age of 80.

== Championships and accomplishments ==
- Big Time Wrestling (San Francisco)
  - NWA United States Heavyweight Championship (San Francisco version) (1 time)
  - NWA World Tag Team Championship (San Francisco version) (3 times) – with Buddy Rose (2) and Roddy Piper (1)
- Cauliflower Alley Club
  - Men's Honoree (2004) – with Buddy Rose
- Central States Wrestling
  - NWA Central States Heavyweight Championship (1 time)
- Championship Wrestling from Florida
  - NWA Southern Heavyweight Championship (Florida version) (1 time)
- NWA Tri-State
  - NWA Tri-State Tag Team Championship (1 time) – with Mike George
- Pacific Northwest Wrestling / Championship Wrestling USA
  - CWUSA Television Championship (5 times)
  - NWA Pacific Northwest Heavyweight Championship (2 times)
  - NWA Pacific Northwest Tag Team Championship (5 times) – with Buddy Rose (3), Kendo Nagasaki (1) and John Rambo (1)
  - NWA Pacific Northwest Television Championship (1 time)
- Ring Around The Northwest Newsletter
  - Tag Team of the Year (1978) with Buddy Rose
  - Wrestler of the Year (1978)
- World Championship Wrestling (Australia)
  - NWA Austra-Asian Tag Team Championship (1 time) – with Larry O'Dea
