= Pacific Northwest Wrestling =

Professional wrestling promotion

- Acronym: PNW
- Founded: 1925
- Style: American Wrestling
- Headquarters: Portland, Oregon
- Founder: Herb Owen
- Owner(s): Herb Owen (1925–1942); Don Owen (1942–1992); Sandy Barr (1992–2001); Frank Culbertson (2001–2007); Don Coss (2007–2025, his death)

Pacific Northwest Wrestling (PNW) (also known as Big Time Wrestling and Portland Wrestling) is the common name used to refer to several different professional wrestling companies, both past and present, based in Portland, Oregon, in the United States. The first such company (that would later become Portland Wrestling) was founded by Herb Owen in 1925. It was the Northwest territory of the National Wrestling Alliance (NWA) from the Alliance's inception in 1948 until 1992. The area was brought to its prime by Herb's son, Don Owen, and this version of Pacific Northwest Wrestling saw many of the top names in pro wrestling come through on a regular basis. The Pacific Northwest was considered one of the main pro wrestling territories from the 1960s to the 1980s.

Portland Wrestling was forced to close its doors in July 1992. The closure came as a result of a slowdown in professional wrestling during the early 1990s, a declaration of bankruptcy by Portland Wrestling's main television sponsor, and negative fallout from a shift in regulatory emphasis by the Oregon Athletic Commission. The telecasts, which originated on Portland station KPTV, ended in December 1991 and were replaced on KPTV by syndicated WWF programming.

Portland Wrestling's referee Sandy Barr purchased the company from the Owen family in 1992 and continued the tradition of professional wrestling in the Pacific Northwest under the name "Championship Wrestling USA".

A new wrestling promotion emerged in 2000, calling itself "Portland Wrestling" and claiming to be a restart of the original Pacific Northwest/Portland Wrestling. It stressed a title lineage (through Len Denton) to the old NWA PNW Championships. Unlike the Don Owen promotion, the new incarnation of Portland Wrestling was not an NWA member. Due to legal problems the company's owner encountered, the promotion was forced to close down in 2007 and the owner sold his ownership rights to former announcer Don Coss. Coss, in conjunction with Roddy Piper, one of Owen's biggest latter-day stars and a Portland-area resident, launched a new promotion in 2012 centered on a television program entitled Portland Wrestling Uncut. This program also originated on KPTV, though it would later move to another Portland television station.

== History ==
=== Beginnings ===
Pacific Northwest Wrestling started in the early 1920s when a former world middleweight and world light-heavyweight (Australian version) wrestling champion by the name of Ted Thye came to Portland with plans to promote both boxing and wrestling. Thye hired Herb Owen as his assistant. While Thye was on a trip home to Australia, Owen had the ownership of the company put in his name. Due to rules in effect within the state of Oregon at that time, Owen now had sole rights to sponsor all boxing and wrestling within the state.

Herb Owen started out just promoting boxing matches, but soon began promoting wrestling matches as well, focusing on lightweights. During this time, sons Don and Elton Owen began helping their father in the family business, helping set up cards and even stepping into the ring on occasion to box or wrestle.

During the early years, Herb brought in boxer Jack Dempsey. According to Barry Owen, Don's son, Dempsey even refereed some wrestling matches for Owen. An unknown to many at the time, George Wagner, worked for Owen early in his career. While in the PNW, Wagner developed the character for which he would become famous, Gorgeous George. Wagner is reported to have married his first wife in the ring before a match in Eugene, Oregon.

In 1942, following his death, Herb's son Don took over the company. In 1944, Don Owen promoted several cards with women wrestlers, until female wrestling was outlawed in Oregon (as it would be until 1975).

=== Don Owen Sports ===
==== 1940s ====
Don Owen, making ring introductions at the Portland Sports Arena in February 1983.

The National Wrestling Alliance was formed in 1948 with Don Owen as one of the founding members. This started the beginning of what became known as NWA Pacific Northwest (Portland Wrestling).

==== 1950s ====
On July 10, 1953, Don Owen started what was the first regular professional wrestling program on television. Pacific Northwest Wrestling aired a weekly 60 minute live program originally called Heidelberg Wrestling, named for its sponsor, Heidelberg Brewing Co. of Tacoma, Washington. The show was initially broadcast on KPTV, but moved to rival KOIN-TV in 1955. Along with the move came the show's new name, Portland Wrestling.

The 1950s were good to Portland Wrestling, seeing wrestlers such as Ed Francis, Gory Guerrero and Tony Borne come to the territory. During this time, John Harrison "Harry" Elliott, a former Oregon State University wrestling champion, and later the school's wrestling coach, began working for Don Owen as a referee and putting on spot shows in the territory. In 1958, Elliott obtained a contract with CBS Television to broadcast Seattle-based wrestling matches throughout all of Washington and parts of Alaska, British Columbia, California, Colorado, Idaho, Montana, Utah and Wyoming. Elliott promoted these matches, as well as spot matches throughout Washington, Idaho and northeastern Oregon, while Don Owen continued to handle bookings for these matches.

==== 1960s ====
After the opening of Portland Memorial Coliseum in 1961, Don Owen occasionally promoted wrestling cards at the venue, drawing good crowds. On September 17, 1966, Harry Elliott promoted and Don Owen booked one of the biggest matches ever in Seattle, packing out the Seattle Center Coliseum with 15,500 fans to see Lou Thesz wrestle a 60-minute time limit draw against Gene Kiniski.

In 1967, Portland Wrestling returned to KPTV. That year, management changed within CBS Television and PNW's regionally broadcast wrestling show was dropped which subsequently led to Harry Elliott's retirement in 1968. Frank Bonnema, an on-air personality in KPTV's sports department, took over the announcing duties at that time, serving as the voice of Portland Wrestling until shortly before his untimely death on October 5, 1982 at age 49.

Despite losing its regionally broadcast television program in 1967, Portland Wrestling was still doing well. In 1968, Owen bought and renovated a bowling alley at 8725 North Chautauqua Boulevard in North Portland, which became the Portland Sports Arena and the new home of Portland Wrestling. The Portland Sports Arena building is still in use as part of a church and is located here: 45°35′09″N 122°42′30″W.

==== 1970s ====
The 1970s continued to be good to Portland Wrestling, with the addition of such superstars as Buddy Rose, Matt Borne, Ed Wiskoski, Roddy Piper, Jesse Ventura, Lonnie Mayne, Jimmy Snuka and Stan Stasiak. In 1976, Dutch Savage bought into Don Owen Sports and began promoting PNW cards in the state of Washington. The Owens' promotion faced opposition from several "outlaw promotions" throughout the 1970s, but remained strong. Eventually Owen's reputation as an honest, well-paying promoter drew a more national level of talent to the PNW territory. As the roster grew, so did the number of shows: in addition to Sports Arena tapings and regular weekly stops in Eugene, Oregon and Salem, Oregon, it was not uncommon for the territory to run spot-shows every night of the week.

For several years during the 1970s and 1980s, PNW's Portland Wrestling program was syndicated to stations throughout the Pacific Northwest in an edited 60-minute version known as Big Time Wrestling. Portland Wrestling was a rather basic television production even by 1970s standards: the program did not air in color until 1972. Even after that, it would occasionally still be produced in black and white if KPTV was airing a Portland Trail Blazers home game on a Saturday night, as the station had only one live production truck capable of broadcasting in color.

Between 1976 and 1985, "Playboy" Buddy Rose became famous for drawing more money than any other wrestler in the history of Portland Wrestling. In 1982 and 1983, Rose wrestled for the WWF, but on his days off he returned to the Northwest and worked one-night stands for Don Owen. Rose was credited with sold-out venues on both the East and West coasts. In 1978, Rose was the United States Champion for Roy Shire Promotions in the San Francisco Bay area. As a team, he and Ed Wiskoski became NWA World Tag Team Champions, defending title matches up and down the West Coast for Don Owen, Roy Shire and Los Angeles promoter Mike LeBell. Beginning in the late 1970s, Rose feuded with Rowdy Roddy Piper in a multi-year-long angle, with the highlight being Rose stealing Piper's kilt and burning it in the Sports Arena's balcony/press row in 1981. Fans watching the match on TV called 911 and firefighters were dispatched to the arena, only to find the building in fine condition when they arrived. (Shows were shot "live to tape" at that time, with little editing and commercials inserted while the program was being shot.)

==== 1980s ====
Wrestling on television became a hot commodity during the 1980s. In 1982, Elton Owen, who had continued working in the family business as his brother Don's right-hand man, retired. Elton died a short time later. Don's son Barry Owen began promoting in Washington. He would then take over promoting the weekly Friday night shows in Eugene as well as spot shows, eventually promoting most of the shows which had previously been promoted by Elton.

Frank Bonnema was admitted to Emanuel Hospital on September 25, 1982 after suffering a heart attack. Bonnema would not return to his Portland Wrestling hosting duties, dying ten days later. On October 9, veteran announcer Don Coss, who had filled in as host during this time, officially took over the announcing duties. Coss had previously announced televised wrestling matches in Salem, Oregon over the defunct station KVDO.

Wrestlers such as Portland native Billy Jack Haynes appeared for the company. Others such as Roddy Piper, King Parsons, Matt Borne, "Gentleman" Chris Adams, Rip Oliver, Buddy Rose, David Schultz, and others competed regularly. Owen had a working relationship with Jack Adkisson's World Class Championship Wrestling promotion in Dallas, which produced several talent exchanges – the most famous of which was when Adams and Parsons were sent to World Class in 1983. Both men became two of the most famous non-Von Erich wrestlers in the promotion's history and became Texas mainstays throughout the rest of their careers.

On May 21, 1985, in honor of the Owen family's 60 years of promoting wrestling, a supercard called 60th Anniversary Wrestling Extravaganza was held at the Portland Memorial Coliseum. The show featured representatives from the NWA, the AWA and the WWF, including the World Champions of both the NWA and AWA and the World Tag Team Champions of the AWA all defending their titles. With this card, PNW accomplished something the WWF/WWE had yet to achieve: a sold-out Coliseum. Barry Owen claimed that this event had the highest attendance ever for a sporting event at the Coliseum. The show saw the final match in the Buddy Rose-Roddy Piper angle as its main event, just weeks after both men appeared at the first-ever WrestleMania, Rose in the opening match as the Masked Executioner and Piper in the main event against Hulk Hogan. Piper received a hero's welcome from the capacity crowd and pinned Rose to end their lengthy feud.

On January 21, 1986, Portland Wrestling held a followup to the supercard, called Superstar Extravaganza, also at the Portland Memorial Coliseum. The show was limited to NWA talent and was not as large or as successful as the first supercard.

==== The decline of Pacific Northwest Wrestling ====
PNW took a number of hits in the late 1980s. Changes to a centralized Oregon Boxing and Wrestling Commission began to affect the industry, through new rules and fines levied at wrestlers and promoters. Additionally, the expansion of the WWF and WCW into national promotions with nationwide television deals ran most local or regional wrestling concerns out of business. This left few territories for younger wrestlers to develop their skills, especially early in their careers, thus leaving very green talent for the non-national promotions. By 1987, Don Owen was the last remaining NWA charter member whose territory was still operating.

Len Denton, working for Owen, became the first booker for PNW that same year and had a hand in developing younger talent such as Art Barr, Scotty The Body (later Raven), C.W. Bergstrom, Steve Doll and Rex King. Scotty, recognized as a good talker, was eventually used as Coss's wisecracking broadcast partner. However, the territory's business continued to slide.

In 1991, Pacific Northwest Wrestling's main television sponsor (Tom Peterson's) declared bankruptcy. Though it was still the Portland television market's highest-rated locally produced show, Portland Wrestling was canceled in December 1991 after airing every week for 38 years. It was the longest-running non-news program on American television at the time of its cancellation and the third-longest-tenured U.S. program overall behind Meet the Press and the CBS Evening News.

Don Owen continued to run wrestling shows throughout Oregon and Washington until April 30, 1992, when he retired and sold the entire company, minus the Sports Arena, to Portland Wrestling's referee and future promoter Sandy Barr. The Portland Sports Arena, as well as a former supermarket building next door which was used by Barr for the flea market he ran, were eventually acquired by a local church.

== Former personnel ==
=== Champions (when the company closed in 1992) ===
Championship	Last Champion
NWA Pacific Northwest Heavyweight Champion	C.W. Bergstrom
NWA Pacific Northwest Tag Team Champions	The Grappler and Steve Doll
NWA Pacific Northwest Television Champion	Scotty The Body

== Trying to rebuild ==
Sandy Barr continued promoting wrestling in the Pacific Northwest under the company names of Championship Wrestling USA and IGA Wrestling. Barr created new titles for the promotion and abandoned the previous titles. As Barr faced challenges when dealing with the Oregon state athletic commission similar to what Owen faced, he decided to move the promotion across the Columbia River to Vancouver, Washington. Barr purchased late night airtime on local television station KOIN for a couple of years, but was never given a stable timeslot. Barr would continue to run weekly shows until shortly before his death on June 2, 2007.

In 1996, Matt Borne became booker of CWUSA and crowds began to rise. Sandy Barr abruptly closed Championship Wrestling USA in 1997. The remaining weeks of television that had been purchased on KOIN were filled with programs from 1993. Matt Borne joined up with Ivan Kafoury, who owned a local radio station, and created the new Portland Wrestling. They ran shows at the Aladdin Theater in Portland and later a flea market near Portland Meadows. Their biggest success came in November 1997 when former University of Oregon football player Josh Wilcox made his pro debut in front of a crowd of over 700 fans.

The physical belt that was used as the NWA Pacific Northwest title was used at various times by its owner Len Denton before being sold on eBay in 2006. The last title claimant was local wrestling historian and part-time pro wrestler Matt Farmer, who defended the title at local lucha libre shows.

== The "New" Portland Wrestling ==
In late 2000, wrestling returned to Portland with the opening of Portland Wrestling. This new promotion claimed that its heavyweight and tag team title lineage were the same as the previous titles operated by Don Owen Sports. However, this "Portland Wrestling" was not an NWA member promotion, nor was it directly linked in any way to the original Portland Wrestling.

The new Portland Wrestling initially aired on Portland's WB TV network affiliate, KWBP-TV (now KRCW-TV). Frank Culbertson, Jr. (born ca. 1959), an advertising representative for the station, served first as ringside announcer and later as executive producer. KWBP changed hands in December 2002, and the new owners dropped virtually all local programming from its lineup, due to a decline in fan base. This development occurred at the same time Portland Wrestling was having major difficulties with the Oregon state government, in particular the athletic commission and the Attorney General's office.

On May 10, 2007, Culbertson, who was still running the operations of the promotion, was arraigned on charges of aggravated theft for allegedly embezzling US$10,000 from Portland-based Broadway Cab Company, where he had been working in the accounting department as a controller. This event came as a surprise to Don Coss who, in light of Culbertson's criminal charges, has expressed uncertainty on the future of Portland Wrestling.

=== Champions when the company closed ===
Title	Champions
PW Pacific Northwest Heavyweight Championship	Dr. Luther
PW Pacific Northwest Tag Team Championship	The Cartel (Big Ugly and Vinny Massaro)
PW Pacific Northwest Light Heavyweight Championship	Timothy Thatcher

== Early championships ==
- World Heavyweight Championship (Northwest Version)
- World Light Heavyweight Championship (Northwest Version)
- Pacific Coast Heavyweight Championship
- Pacific Coast Junior Heavyweight Championship
- Pacific Coast Light Heavyweight Championship
- Pacific Coast Middleweight Championship
- Intermountain Junior Heavyweight Championship

== NWA Regional Championships (Don Owen Sports era) ==
- NWA Pacific Northwest Heavyweight Championship
- NWA Pacific Northwest Tag Team Championship
- NWA Pacific Northwest Television Championship

== Championship Wrestling USA Championships ==
- Championship Wrestling International Alliance World Heavyweight Championship
- Championship Wrestling International Alliance International Heavyweight Championship
- Championship Wrestling International Alliance International Tag Team Championship
- Championship Wrestling USA Television Championship
- Championship Wrestling USA Northwest Tag Team Championship

== See also ==
- List of National Wrestling Alliance territories
