= American Force =

Professional wrestling tag team

Tag team
- Members: Paul Diamond; Nick Kiniski
- Name: American Force
- Debut: 1985
- Disbanded: 1985

American Force was a professional wrestling tag team that wrestled in Texas All-Star Wrestling. The team consisted of Paul Diamond and Nick Kiniski. The group was later joined by a rookie Shawn Michaels who replaced Kiniski in the team to team up with Paul Diamond.

== History ==
=== Diamond and Kiniski ===
Paul Diamond and Nick Kiniski formed a tag team in Fred Barend's Texas All-Star Wrestling called American Breed. Neither Diamond nor Kiniski were actually American; Diamond was Croatian-Canadian and Kiniski was Canadian. The team won the TASW Tag Team Championship from The Maoris (Tudui & Wakahi) on May 25, 1985, and held them until Al Madril and Chavo Guerrero took the titles from them on June 5, 1985. The TASW Tag Team title was vacated later that same month when Guerrero refused to wrestle in a rematch against Diamond and Kiniski because Chavo's father Gory Guerrero was the special referee chosen for the match.

=== Diamond and Michaels ===
American Force

Tag team
- Members: Paul Diamond; Shawn Michaels
- Name: American Force
- Billed heights: Diamond: 6 ft 1 in (1.85 m); Michaels: 6 ft 1 in (1.85 m)
- Combined billed weight: 455 lb (206 kg)
- Debut: 1985
- Disbanded: 1986

Al Madril teamed with Black Gordman instead but lost the match. After the match, Madril attacked Chavo Guerrero, splitting the team and forcing the titles to be held up. When Chavo later won the rights to name a new championship partner after defeating Madril in a singles match, he chose to give the titles to the American Force instead, only now the team consisted of Paul Diamond and a rookie named Shawn Michaels. They feuded for a short time with Toshiaki Kawada and Hiromichi Fuyuki, who were called The Japanese Force. The duo won the TASW Tag Team Championship twice. The team was later disbanded in 1986 when Michaels left for American Wrestling Association.

== Championships and accomplishments ==
- Diamond and Kiniski
  - Texas All-Star Wrestling
    - TASW Tag Team Championship (1 time)
- Diamond and Michaels
  - Texas All-Star Wrestling
    - TASW Tag Team Championship (2 times)

== See also ==
- Badd Company
- The Orient Express
- The Rockers
