= Kiniski =

Kiniski may refer to:

== People ==
- Julia Kiniski (1899–1969), local politician in Edmonton, Alberta, Canada
- Gene Kiniski (1928–2010), Canadian wrestler and one of six children of Julia Kiniski
- Kelly Kiniski (born 1960), Canadian wrestler and the older son of Gene Kiniski
- Nick Kiniski (born 1961), Canadian wrestler and the younger son of Gene Kiniski

== Characters ==
- "Werewolf Killer Kiniski", a vampire character in the Japanese manga Princess Resurrection
- Lewis Kiniski, a character on The Drew Carey Show portrayed by Ryan Stiles

== See also ==
- Kiniski Gardens, Edmonton, a neighborhood named for Julia Kiniski
