= Jonathan Boyd =

Australian professional wrestler (1944–1999)

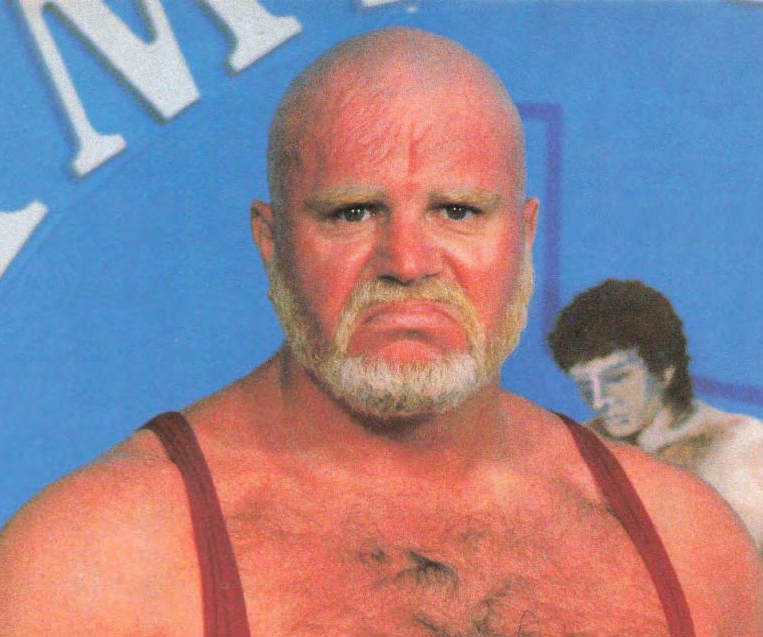
- Boyd, c. 1983

Personal information
- Born: Jonathan Barry Boyle; 21 October 1944 Sydney, Australia
- Died: 7 August 1999 (aged 54) Portland, Oregon, U.S.

Professional wrestling career
- Ring names: John Boyle; Johnny Boyd; Johnny Boyle; Johnny Miller; Jonathan Boyd; Jules Cadreau; Laurie Boyd; Lord Jonathan Boyd
- Billed height: 6 ft 1 in (185 cm)
- Billed weight: 238 lb (108 kg)
- Billed from: Sydney, New South Wales, Australia; Tasmania, Australia
- Trained by: Al Morgan
- Debut: 1965
- Retired: 1991

Jonathan Barry Boyle (21 October 1944 – 7 August 1999) was an Australian professional wrestler, better known by the ring name "Lord" Jonathan Boyd. Initially Boyd competed both in North American and international promotions as part of the Royal Kangaroos with his cousin Norman Frederick Charles III. Later on Boyd would team up with Luke Williams as the Sheepherders and compete in many North American federations such as the Continental Wrestling Association, Southeast Championship Wrestling, and Southwest Championship Wrestling. Boyd would also act as a manager for Luke and Butch Miller as they competed under the "Sheepherder" name.

== Professional wrestling career ==
=== Royal Kangaroos (1965–1977) ===
Boyle made his professional wrestling debut in 1965, spending several years wrestling for World Championship Wrestling in his native Australia. After several years, he and his cousin, Norman Frederick Charles III, relocated to North America to compete as the Royal Kangaroos, a name inspired by the legendary tag team the Fabulous Kangaroos.

Boyle and Charles worked mainly for Pacific Northwest Wrestling in Oregon, capturing their first NWA Pacific Northwest Tag Team Championship from Kurt and Karl Von Steiger on 11 July 1971. They won the titles three more times in 1971 and 1972. Boyd would also work in the singles ranks capturing the main NWA Pacific Northwest title on 31 July 1971 when he defeated Kurt Von Steiner for the NWA Pacific Northwest Heavyweight Championship. Boyd lost the title to Dutch Savage only to regain it a month later on 28 November. On 28 December, Savage once again beat Boyd for the title and subsequently managed to keep it away from him.

From July 1972 to October 1973, the Royal Kangaroos worked for Mid-Atlantic Championship Wrestling. In late 1972, they began a lengthy feud with Art Nelson and Johnny Weaver. During their time in the promotion, they held the NWA Brass Knuckles Tag Team Championship.

Throughout 1974, the Royal Kangaroos wrestled for the Atlanta, Georgia-based All-South Wrestling Alliance (ASWA), where they held the ASWA Georgia Tag Team Championship on two occasions.

In February and March 1974, the Royal Kangaroos toured Japan with New Japan Pro-Wrestling as part of its "Big Fight Series". In addition to teaming together, they also wrestled singles matches and teamed with other gaijin, including André the Giant, Eric the Animal, and Les Thornton. Their opponents included the Yamaha Brothers (Kantaro Hoshino and Kotetsu Yamamoto), Seiji Sakaguchi, Osamu Kido, and Antonio Inoki.

In 1975, the Royal Kangaroos returned to Pacific Northwest Wrestling, where they won the NWA Pacific Northwest Tag Team Championship twice more. They left the promotion again in June 1976.

In January 1976, the Royal Kangaroos again toured Japan, this time with All Japan Pro Wrestling as part of its "New Year Giant Series". Their opponents on the tour included Akihisa Takachiho, The Destroyer, Giant Baba, and Jumbo Tsuruta.

In June 1976, the Royal Kangaroos joined the San Francisco, California-based Big Time Wrestling promotion. In September 1976, they defeated Pat Patterson and Tony Garea for the NWA World Tag Team Championship; they lost the titles to the Valiant Brothers in November 1976. The Royal Kangaroos left Big Time Wrestling in January 1977.

After a brief return to Pacific Northwest Wrestling, the Royal Kangaroos joined Stu Hart's Stampede Wrestling promotion in February 1977. In June 1977, the duo defeated Leo Burke and Keith Hart for the Stampede International Tag Team Championship but dropped it to Leo Burke and his new tag team partner Bobby Burke only a short time later. The Royal Kangaroos broke up in mid-1977 after a disagreement about how to promote themselves.

=== Singles run (1977–1981) ===
Boyd returned to Pacific Northwest Wrestling in August 1977. In August 1978, he briefly reformed the Royal Kangaroos with Charles in NWA All-Star Wrestling. On 22 August 1978, Boyd defeated Ed Wiskoski to win his third NWA Pacific Northwest Heavyweight Championship. Boyd reigned for six months until he was defeated by PNW's fastest rising star "Rowdy" Roddy Piper. In November 1978, Boyd won the NWA Pacific Northwest Tag Team Championship for a seventh and final time, this time with Dutch Savage as his tag team partner. Boyd left PNW in July 1979.

In mid-1979, Boyd began travelling the other NWA territories, working under such names as "Wild Colonial Boy" Johnny Boyd and "Maniac" Jonathan Boyd. His first stop after leaving the Oregon/Washington territory was due south to the Los Angeles, California-based NWA Hollywood Wrestling promotion, where he teamed up with Coloso Colosetti to defeat Barry Orton and Héctor Guerrero to win the NWA Americas Tag Team Championship on 18 May 1979, only to lose the title to the Twin Devils the next day. In August 1978, Boyd joined Georgia Championship Wrestling, where he remained until November 1979. After a short stint in Mid-South Wrestling, he began wrestling in Texas for Big Time Wrestling and Houston Wrestling. He returned to Pacific Northwest Wrestling in mid-1980, where he feuded with Igor Volkoff and Stan Stasiak. He remained in Pacific Northwest Wrestling until mid-1981.

=== New Sheepherders (1981–1985) ===
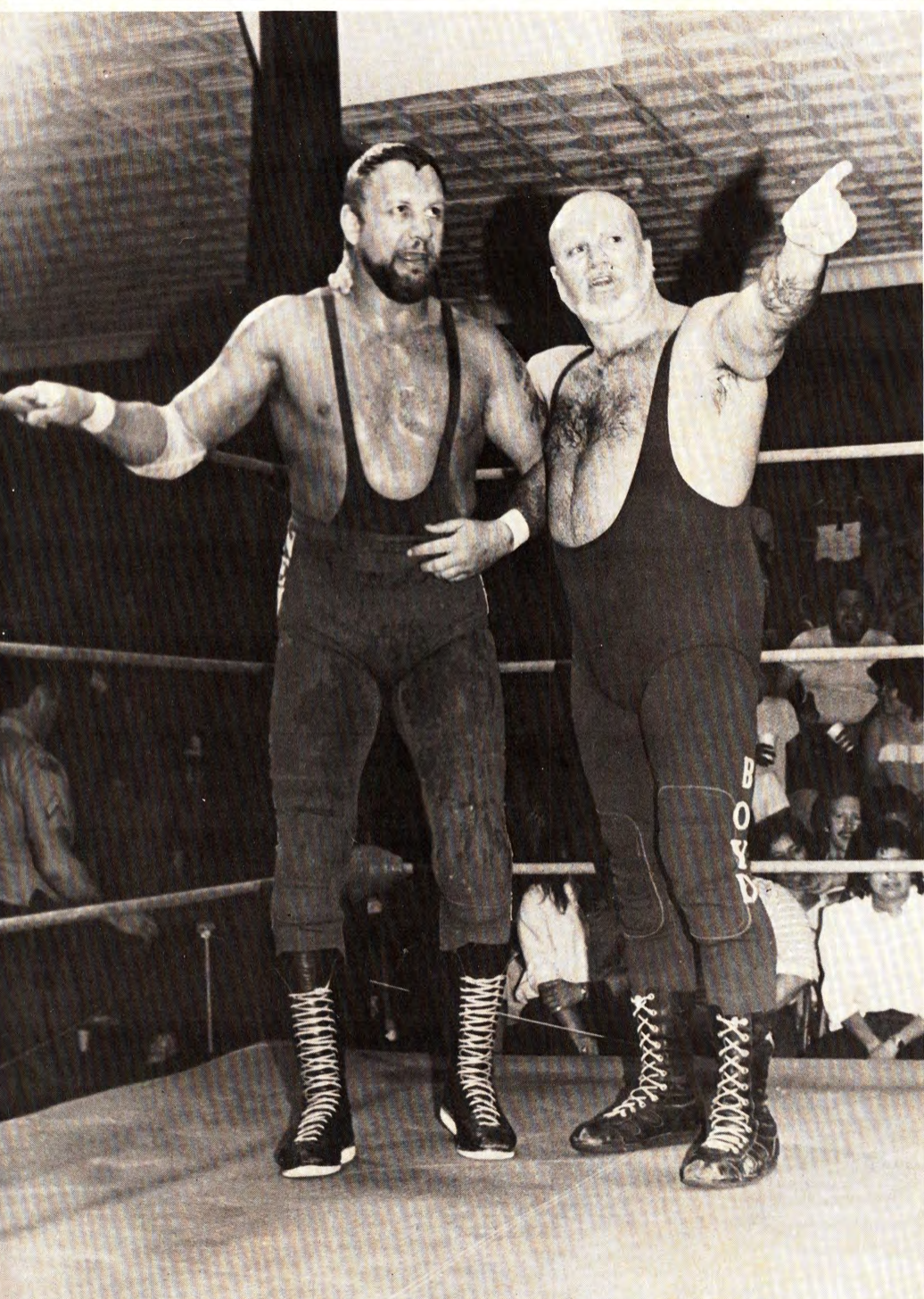
Boyd (right) and Luke Williams (left) as the New Shepherders, c. 1983

In mid-1981, Butch Miller of the Sheepherders decided that he wanted to return closer to home and relocated to Australia to wrestle. His partner Luke Williams remained in the Americas. At the time, Miller and Williams were the NWA North American Tag Team Champions in the Puerto Rican Capitol Sports Promotions. Boyd (billed for the match as "Johnny Miller") teamed with Williams to drop the titles to Jack Brisco and Jerry Brisco. Boyd and Williams subsequently began wrestling in Championship Wrestling from Florida as the "Kiwi Sheepherders" and the "New Zealand Sheepherders". The duo of Boyd and Williams quickly gained a reputation of one of the most violent, hard hitting teams in the business. They left Championship Wrestling from Florida in October 1981.

After briefly appearing with Georgia Championship Wrestling, Boyd and Williams joined the Alabama-based Southeastern Championship Wrestling promotion in December 1981. The tag team of Robert Fuller and Jos LeDuc had split when LeDuc turned on Fuller during a match; LeDuc subsequently brought in the Sheepherders to be a part of his "Commonwealth Connection" to fight against Robert Fuller and the entire Fuller family. In December 1981, the Sheepherders won the NWA Southeast Tag Team Championship that had been vacated when Fuller and LeDuc split and defended the titles against Robert Fuller and various partners including his brother Ron Fuller and his cousin Jimmy Golden. One act that made the Sheepherders the most hated men in Southeastern Championship Wrestling was when they attacked and injured (storyline) Jimmy's father Billy Golden. Williams and Boyd kept the upper hand for months as Robert Fuller recruited partner after partner to defeat the Sheepherders. On 11 September 1982, the Sheepherders were finally defeated by Fuller and Golden ending the feud on a high for the face duo as the Sheepherders were "run out" of Southeastern Championship Wrestling.

In October 1982, Boyd and Williams moved to work in the Memphis, Tennessee-based Continental Wrestling Association, owned and operated by Jerry Jarrett and Jerry Lawler. The team became involved in a feud with Jacques Rougeau and Terry Taylor at the Mid-South Coliseum with the Sheepherders brawling their way to victory. Taylor and Rougeau defeated the Sheepherders in a "Coal Miner's Glove" match. The duo later returned to the ring and defeated the territory's main stars Jerry Lawler and Bill Dundee. The next feud for Boyd and Williams was against The Fabulous Ones (Stan Lane and Steve Keirn). The matches started out evenly with the Fabulous Ones and the Sheepherders splitting the decisions but soon turned brutal without a definite winner. In late 1982, the Sheepherders won the AWA Southern Tag Team Championship from Lane and Keirn. Between late December and mid February, the two teams traded the belts back and forth 4 times with the Fabulous Ones ending with possession of them in the end. In March 1983, the Sheepherders wrestled their last match in the Mid-South Coliseum before leaving the Continental Wrestling Association.

In May 1983, Boyd and Williams resurfaced in Southwest Championship Wrestling, continuing their brutal and destructive ways. Their first target was the reigning SCW Southwest Tag Team Champions "The Grapplers" (Len Denton and Tony Anthony). Shortly after debuting, the Sheepherders won the gold from the duo through nefarious means: before the match Williams and Boyd had bribed the Grapplers' manager Don Carson and promised he would become a tag team champion; Carson turned on the Grapplers mid-match to ensure the Sheepherders' victory. The Sheepherders' run with the gold was short-lived because, in mid-1983, Jonathan Boyd legitimately broke both his legs in a car accident, which forced the SWCW to name Bobby Jaggers as a replacement for Boyd. After Williams and Jagger lost a non-title match to Bob Sweetan and Sweet Brown Sugar, Williams turned on Jaggers and the titles were vacated. While Boyd was out with the broken leg, Williams was reunited with his old tag-team partner, Butch, straight in from Australia. Once Boyd was recovered enough, he began acting as the Sheepherders' manager despite still on crutches. Over the next year or two, Boyd works mainly as a manager for the Sheepherders and as a booker for SWCW.

=== Kiwi Sheepherders (1985–1986) ===
In 1985, Boyd once again began wrestling as a Sheepherder, but this time he did not team up with Luke Williams but instead teamed with Rip Morgan (a former flag bearer for the Sheepherders) and continued the Sheepherder legacy of violence as the "Kiwi Sheepherders". Wrestling in the Continental Wrestling Association, Boyd and Morgan quickly made a mark on Memphis by beating their long-time opposition the Fabulous Ones for the AWA Southern Tag Team Championship on 17 June 1985. The team was soon stripped of the titles due to excessive cheating, but had the titles returned to them when Boyd and Morgan threatened to sue CWA management. Instead of taking the titles from the Sheepherders by stripping them, the Fabulous Ones took the AWA Southern Tag Team Championship from them the old fashioned way – four times in a row between 5 September and 12 October.

After the series of violent matches with the Fabulous Ones came to an end, the Sheepherders came face to face with another team that would turn out to be a constant thorn in their side: the Fantastics (Bobby Fulton and Tommy Rogers). Jonathan Boyd reunited with the Sheepherders in the World Wrestling Council in Puerto Rico. In the winter of 1985, the Kiwi Sheepherders and the Fantastics traded wins back and forth with no side gaining a clear advantage in their feud. In January 1986, the Kiwi Sheepherders defeated the teams of Koko Ware and Rick Casey and also the team of Tojo Yamamoto and Dirty Rhodes to reach the finals of a tournament to crown new Southern Tag Team Champions, but in the finals they fell to the Fantastics. The loss to the Fantastics only intensified the Sheepherders' anger, bringing the feud to its high point as the two teams clashed in a "No DQ Loser Leaves Town" match on 20 January 1986. The Kiwi Sheepherders lost and left Memphis while the Fantastics rode a wave of popularity thanks to the feud.

Throughout mid-1986, Boyd wrestled for Texas All-Star Wrestling.

In November 1986, the Kiwi Sheepherders returned to the Continental Wrestling Association for a brief run. Boyd and "Bigfoot" (Bob Hallow) cut through the competition and won a fourth Southern Tag Team championship when they beat Billy Joe Travis and Jeff Jarrett in a tournament to crown new tag team champions. Their run with the titles was brief as Jarrett and Travis won the titles a week later and then ran the Kiwi Sheepherders out of the area in a "Loser Leaves Town" match a week after beating them for the title. The Kiwi Sheepherders subsequently disbanded.

=== Late career (1986–1991) ===
In late-1986, Boyd again began wrestling as a singles for promotions including the Tennessee-based Continental Wrestling Association and the Alabama-based Continental Championship Wrestling / Continental Wrestling Federation.

On January 11, 1988, Boyd defeated Ranger Ross for the NWA Alabama Heavyweight Championship in Continental Championship Wrestling. Boyd held the title for just over a month before dropping the gold to "Doctor" Tom Prichard. On 28 December of that year, Boyd won his last title when he defeated Joe Savoldi for the IWCCW Heavyweight Championship. Boyd once again only held the title briefly losing it back to Savoldi in January 1989.

On 25 December 1989, "Lord" Jonathan Boyd lost to Rex King in his retirement match in Portland, Oregon for the same promotion that gave him his first break in the United States, Pacific Northwest Wrestling. He returned to wrestling on March 11, 1991 for World Championship Wrestling's television tapings, teaming in a six-man tag team match with Mark Kyle and Joe Cruz in a loss to Dustin Rhodes and the Young Pistols. His final match took place on August 10, 1991 in Portland, Oregon, in Pacific Northwest Wrestling where he went to a double count-out against The Grappler under the ring name "Johnny Miller".

== Professional wrestling style and persona ==
As Jonathan Boyd, Boyle affected the title "Lord". His signature moves were the Iron Claw and the neckbreaker.

== Personal life ==
Boyd owned a DMC DeLorean. He was married and divorced three times.

Boyd died on 7 August 1999, aged 54, of a heart attack.

== Championships and accomplishments ==
- All-South Wrestling Alliance
  - ASWA Georgia Tag Team Championship (2 times) – with Norman Frederick Charles III
- Big Time Wrestling
  - NWA World Tag Team Championship (San Francisco version) (1 times) – with Norman Frederick Charles III
- Continental Wrestling Association
  - AWA Southern Tag Team Championship (7 times) – with Luke Williams (2) and Rip Morgan (5)
- Georgia Championship Wrestling
  - NWA Georgia Television Championship (1 time)
- International World Class Championship Wrestling
  - IWCCW Heavyweight Championship (1 time)
- Mid-Atlantic Championship Wrestling
  - NWA Brass Knuckles Tag Team Championship (1 time) – with Norman Frederick Charles III
- NWA Hollywood Wrestling
  - NWA Americas Tag Team Championship (1 time) – with Coloso Colosetti
- Pacific Northwest Wrestling
  - NWA Pacific Northwest Heavyweight Championship (3 times)
  - NWA Pacific Northwest Tag Team Championship (7 times) – with Norman Frederick Charles III (6) and Dutch Savage (1)
- Ring Around The Northwest Newsletter
  - Wrestler of the Year (1971)
  - Tag Team of the Year (1975) with Norman Frederick Charles III
- Southeastern Championship Wrestling / Continental Wrestling Federation
  - NWA Alabama Heavyweight Championship (1 time)
  - NWA Southeastern Tag Team Championship (1 time) – with Luke Williams
- Southwest Championship Wrestling / Texas All-Star Wrestling
  - SWCW Southwest Tag Team Championship (1 time) – with Luke Williams
- Stampede Wrestling
  - NWA International Tag Team Championship (Calgary version) (1 time) – with Norman Frederick Charles III
- Other titles
  - South Pacific World Tag Team Championship (1 time) – with Norman Frederick Charles III
