= Norman Frederick Charles III =

Australian professional wrestler (1941–2019)

Personal information
- Born: Norman Lowndes; 25 July 1941 Droylsden, England
- Died: 22 August 2019 (aged 78) Milton, Florida, U.S.

Professional wrestling career
- Ring name(s): Norman Frederick Charles III; Maurice LaRue; Murphy the Surfie; Murphy the Magnificent; Norman Fredick Charles; Wild Red Berry
- Billed height: 6 ft 0 in (1.83 m)
- Billed weight: 242 lb (110 kg)
- Billed from: Sydney, Australia
- Trained by: Al Morgan
- Debut: 1960
- Retired: 1983

Norman Frederick Charles III (25 July 1941 – 22 August 2019) was an English professional wrestler who was known worldwide under the name Murphy the Surfie. Initially Charles competed both in North American and international promotions as part of The Royal Kangaroos with his cousin Jonathan Boyd.

== Professional wrestling career ==
Charles made his professional wrestling debut in 1960, wrestling initially in Australia before he and his cousin travelled to North America to compete as The Royal Kangaroos, a name inspired by the legendary tag team the Fabulous Kangaroos. Boyle and Charles worked mainly for Pacific Northwest Wrestling in Oregon, capturing their first NWA Pacific Northwest Tag Team Championship from Kurt and Karl Von Steiger on 11 July 1971, their first reign lasted only 6 weeks but the cousins would win the tag team title a further four times between June 1971 and December 1975.

After working for Pacific Northwest, the Royal Kangaroos headed further north to join Stu Hart's Stampede Wrestling promotion. In June 1977 the duo defeated Leo Burke and Keith Hart for the Stampede International Tag Team Championship but dropped it to Leo Burke and his new tag team partner Bobby Burke only a short time later. After their run in Stampede together the Royal Kangaroos broke up after a disagreement in Calgary Canada over differences in how to promote themselves. They reunited for a short time in 1978 in Vancouver. Charles remained with Stampede for some time while Jonathan Boyd returned to the Pacific Northwest.

== Championships and accomplishments ==
- All-South Wrestling Alliance
  - ASWA Georgia Tag Team Championship (2 times) – with Jonathan Boyd
- Big Time Wrestling (San Francisco)
  - NWA World Tag Team Championship (San Francisco version) (1 time) – with Jonathan Boyd
- Cauliflower Alley Club
  - Other honoree (2001)
- Mid-Atlantic Championship Wrestling
  - Mid-Atlantic Brass Knuckles Tag Team Championship (1 time) – with Jonathan Boyd
- Pacific Northwest Wrestling
  - NWA Pacific Northwest Tag Team Championship (6 times) – with Jonathan Boyd
- Ring Around The Northwest Newsletter
  - Tag Team of the Year (1975) with Jonathan Boyd
- Southeastern Championship Wrestling
  - NWA Alabama Heavyweight Championship (1 time)
  - NWA Southeastern United States Junior Heavyweight Championship (1 time)
- Stampede Wrestling
  - Stampede British Commonwealth Mid-Heavyweight Championship (3 times)
  - NWA International Tag Team Championship (Calgary version) (3 times) – with Jonathan Boyd (1), Cuban Assassin (2)
- Other titles
  - South Pacific World Tag Team Championship (1 time) – with Jonathan Boyd
