= The Royal Kangaroos =

Professional wrestling tag team

Tag team
- Members: "Lord" Jonathan Boyd; Norman Frederick Charles III
- Billed from: Sydney, Australia
- Debut: 1969
- Disbanded: 1978

The Royal Kangaroos was a professional wrestling tag team consisting of cousins "Lord" Jonathan Boyd and Norman Frederick Charles III. The duo played off their Australian heritage which included using a boomerang as their weapon of choice. Boyd and Charles were known for their brutal, brawling style.

== History ==
Cousins Jonathan Boyd and Norman Frederick Charles III both came into the pro wrestling world with a solid amateur background behind them. Initially they wrestled in singles competition but a few years after their debut they decided to team up and head to North America. The two became known as The Royal Kangaroos, a name inspired by the legendary tag team the "Fabulous Kangaroos." Like the original Fabulous Kangaroos (Al Costello and Roy Heffernan) who were despised heels and started riots wherever they appeared, Boyd and Charles were vicious rulebreakers. Boyd and Charles worked mainly for Pacific Northwest Wrestling in Oregon, capturing their first NWA Pacific Northwest Tag Team Championship from Kurt and Karl Von Steiger on 11 July 1971, their first reign lasted only 6 weeks before losing the titles to Frankie Laine and Big Snuka. The Kangaroos regained the titles and held on to them by hook or by crook until Dutch Savage and Beauregarde defeated them on 26 November 1971.

The Royal Kangaroos regained the titles only a few short weeks later and would hold them until 17 April where they fell to the PNW Tag Team powerhouse of Tony Borne and Moondog Mayne (it was their 11th reign together as PNW Tag Team champions). Like before the Kangaroos were not without the title for long as they cheated their way to a victory on 9 May. After losing the title to Dutch Savage and Moondog Mayne on 17 June the Royal Kangaroos ventured outside of the Portland Territory. The team would win the South Pacific World Tag Team Championship in 1974, a championship that represented Australia, New Zealand, New Guinea, French Numea, Western Samoa and parts of Africa.

After travelling around the world the Kangaroos returned to the territory that brought them the most fame and won their 5th PNW Tag Team Championship on 27 February 1975 when they defeated Dutch Savage and Jimmy Snuka. The Australians would go on to dominate the Portland tag team division as they held on to the titles for 10 months before finally being unseated by Savage and Snuka on 25 December. Their sixth and last run with the PNW tag team title only lasted 3 days as they won the gold from and then lost it back to the combination of Jesse Ventura and Apache Bull Ramos between 5 June and 8 June.

After working for Pacific Northwest for a number of years, the Royal Kangaroos headed south a bit to work for the San Francisco based World Wrestling Alliance. In San Francisco the duo won the S.F. version of the NWA World Tag Team Championship from Pat Patterson and Tony Garea on 18 September 1976. Their run with the gold ended on 4 December when they lost to Jimmy and Johnny Valiant. After losing the gold the Royal Kangaroos moved on from the San Francisco territory and headed further north to join Stu Hart's Stampede Wrestling promotion in Calgary. In June 1977, the duo defeated Leo Burke and Keith Hart for the Stampede International Tag Team Championship but dropped it to Leo Burke and his new tag team partner Bobby Burke only a short time later. After their run in Stampede the duo briefly worked for the NWA Mid-Atlantic where they held the Mid-Atlantic Brass Knucks Championship. After teaming for over seven years together the Royal Kangaroos broke up in 1978; Charles returned to Stampede for some time while Jonathan Boyd returned to the Pacific Northwest. Jonathan Boyd would later find fame as one-half of the Sheepherders alongside Luke Williams while Norman Frederick Charles III remained a singles competitor.

== Championships and accomplishments ==
- All-South Wrestling Alliance
  - ASWA Georgia Tag Team Championship (2 times)
- Big Time Wrestling (San Francisco)
  - NWA World Tag Team Championship (San Francisco version) (1 time)
- Mid-Atlantic Championship Wrestling
  - NWA Mid-Atlantic Brass Knuckles Tag Team Championship (1 time)
- Pacific Northwest Wrestling
  - NWA Pacific Northwest Tag Team Championship (6 times)
- Ring Around The Northwest Newsletter
  - Tag Team of the Year (1975)
- Stampede Wrestling
  - Stampede International Tag Team Championship (1 time)
- Other championships
  - South Pacific World Tag Team Championship (1 time)
