= Danny Fargo =

American professional wrestler

Personal information
- Born: Audie Leon Hager; June 13, 1959 Nicholasville, Kentucky
- Died: December 26, 2003 (aged 44) Nicholasville, Kentucky

Professional wrestling career
- Ring name(s): Danny Fargo; Dan Greer; El Momio
- Billed height: 5 ft 11 in (1.80 m)
- Billed weight: 275 lb (125 kg)
- Trained by: Dale Mann; The Sheik
- Debut: 1974
- Retired: 2001

Audie Leon Hager (June 13, 1959 – December 26, 2003) was an American professional wrestler, best known by his ring names Danny Fargo and Dan Greer. Hager also worked for the World Wrestling Council as El Momio, and also worked in Mexico.

== Career ==
Hager, using the name Dan Greer, began teaming with Eric Embry as the Fabulous Blonds, replacing Ken Timbs in the Southwest Championship Wrestling (SCW) tag team. They won the SCW Southern Tag Team Championship twice. Hager also replaced Ken Timbs, once again, in the Fabulous Fargo tag team in World Organization of Wrestling in 1987. He also formed a long time tag team with Johnny "Bam Bam" Reeves known as The Boogie Woogie Men. They won the Mountain Wrestling Association (MWA) tag titles multiple times.

As a singles star, Hager was one of the most popular in central Kentucky. In 1995, Hager purchased Mountain Wrestling Association (MWA) from Dale Mann, but sold it in 1998. In 1999 Hager got back into the wrestling game by starting Universal Wrestling Alliance (UWA). UWA also never reached the success of the MWA and eventually folded in 2001. Hager retired permanently in 2001.

== Personal life ==
Hager was married to a former professional wrestler, Miss Cricket. Hager had three children, two sons and a daughter. At the time of his death, Hager had five grandchildren.

Hager died from cancer on December 26, 2003.

== Championships and accomplishments ==
- Mid-Continental Wrestling Association
  - MWA Heavyweight Championship (1 time)
  - MWA Kentucky/Tennessee Heavyweight Championship (2 times)
  - MWA Tag Team Championship (1 time) - with George Weingeroff
  - MWA 6-Man Tag Team Championship (1 time) - with Dale Mann
- Mountain Wrestling Association
  - MWA Heavyweight Championship (5 times)
  - MWA Tag Team Championship (3 times) - with Johnny Reeves
- Southwest Championship Wrestling
  - SCW Southwest Tag Team Championship (2 times) - with Eric Embry
- World Wrestling Organization
  - WWO Tag Team Championship (1 time) - with Pat Rose

== See also ==
- List of premature professional wrestling deaths
