= Shawn Michaels =

American professional wrestler (born 1965)

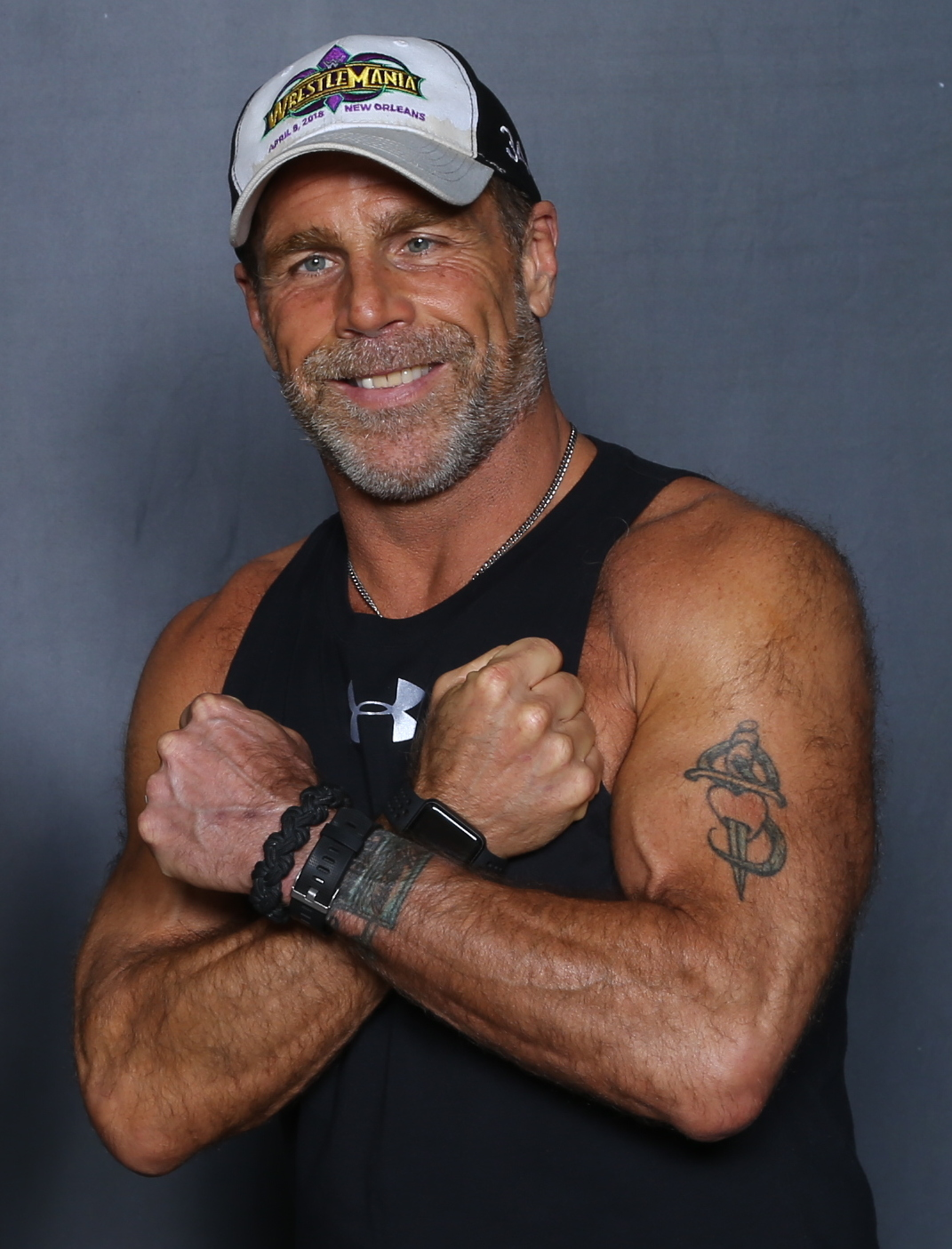
- Michaels in 2018

Personal information
- Born: Michael Shawn Hickenbottom; July 22, 1965 (age 61) Chandler, Arizona, U.S.
- Spouses: Theresa Wood (m. 1988; div. 1994); Rebecca Curci (m. 1999)
- Children: 2
- Relative: Matt Bentley (cousin)

Professional wrestling career
- Ring name(s): Sean Michaels; Shawn Michaels
- Billed height: 6 ft 1 in (185 cm)
- Billed weight: 225 lb (102 kg)
- Billed from: San Antonio, Texas
- Trained by: José Lothario
- Debut: October 8, 1984
- Retired: March 28, 2010

Signature
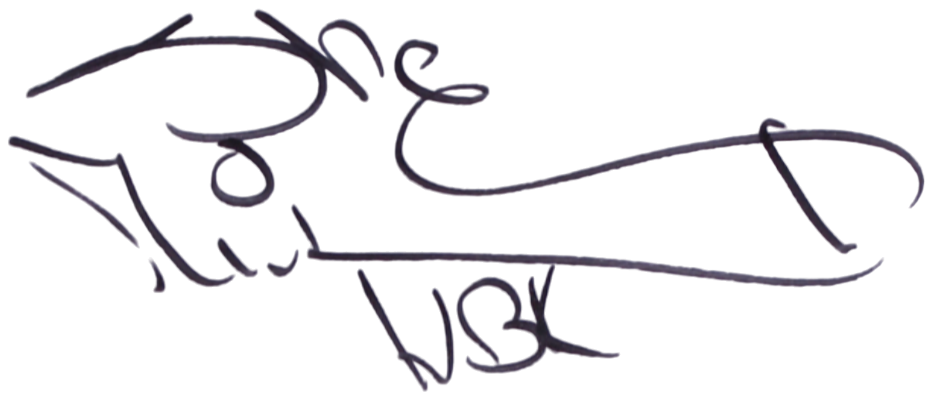

Michael Shawn Hickenbottom (born July 22, 1965) is an American retired professional wrestler, known for the ring name Shawn Michaels. He is signed to WWE, where he is the Senior Vice President of Talent Development, Creative, and oversees the creative aspects of the NXT brand, the promotion's developmental territory. Regarded as one of the greatest professional wrestlers of all time, he is known by the nicknames "the Heartbreak Kid" (often abbreviated as HBK), "the Showstopper", and "Mr. WrestleMania".

Michaels wrestled consistently for WWE, formerly the World Wrestling Federation (WWF, renamed in 2002), from 1988 until his first retirement in 1998. He performed in non-wrestling roles for the next two years, resuming his wrestling career with WWE in 2002 until ceremoniously retiring in 2010. He returned for a one-off final match in 2018. In 2016, he began working as a coach at the WWE Performance Center, and was a producer on NXT in 2018, before becoming the Senior Vice President of Talent Development Creative for the NXT brand itself.

In WWF/WWE, Michaels headlined pay-per-view events between 1989 and 2018, main-eventing the company's flagship annual event, WrestleMania, five times (12, 14, 20, 23 and 26). He was the co-founder and original leader of the successful stable, D-Generation X. Michaels also wrestled in the American Wrestling Association (AWA), where he founded The Midnight Rockers with Marty Jannetty in 1985. After winning the AWA World Tag Team Championship twice, the team continued to the WWF as The Rockers and had a high-profile breakup in January 1992. Within the year, Michaels twice challenged for the WWF Championship and won his first Intercontinental Championship, heralding his arrival as one of the industry's premier singles stars.

Michaels is a four-time world champion, having held the WWF Championship three times and WWE's World Heavyweight Championship once. He is also a two-time Royal Rumble winner (and the first man to win the match as the first entrant), the company's first Grand Slam Champion and fourth Triple Crown Champion, as well as a two-time WWE Hall of Fame inductee (2011 as a singles wrestler and 2019 as part of D-Generation X). Michaels won the Pro Wrestling Illustrated "Match of the Year" reader vote a record eleven times, and his match against John Cena on April 23, 2007, was ranked by WWE as the best match ever aired on the company's flagship television program, Raw. Michaels has been a participant in the first installment of a several of WWE's signature gimmick matches—namely the first Hell in a Cell at the Badd Blood: In Your House, the first Ladder match during a taping of WWF Wrestling Challenge (and subsequent first pay-per-view installment at WrestleMania X), both the inaugural (as part of The Rockers tag team) and first televised (at WrestleMania XII) Iron Man matches, and Elimination Chamber at the 2002 Survivor Series.

== Early life ==
Michael Shawn Hickenbottom was born in Chandler, Arizona, on July 22, 1965. He has an older sister named Shari and two older brothers named Randy and Scott. He was raised in a military family and briefly spent some of his early years in the English town of Reading, Berkshire, but grew up primarily in San Antonio, Texas. As a child, he disliked the name "Michael" and convinced his family and friends to address him by his middle name. Ever since, he has been referred to as Shawn. Additionally, Hickenbottom moved around frequently since his father was in the military. He knew he wanted to become a professional wrestler at the age of 12 and performed a wrestling routine at his high school's talent show, complete with fake blood. He was a keen athlete while growing up, and his sporting career began at the age of six when he played football. He was a stand-out linebacker at Randolph High School on Randolph Air Force Base and eventually became captain of the football team. He attended Southwest Texas State University in San Marcos, Texas, but dropped out to pursue a career in professional wrestling. His cousin Matt Bentley is also a wrestler.

== Professional wrestling career ==
=== National Wrestling Alliance territories (1984–1985) ===
Hickenbottom began to train under Mexican professional wrestler José Lothario. During his training, Hickenbottom adopted the ring name, "Shawn Michaels". After his training with Lothario, he debuted as Shawn Michaels with the National Wrestling Alliance's (NWA) Mid-South Wrestling territory on October 16, 1984, against Art Crews, losing to Crews via swinging neckbreaker. Michaels's performance in his debut match impressed many veterans, including Terry Taylor. Michaels made his televised debut on October 20, 1984, teaming with Jim Hornet in a losing effort against the tag team of Hercules Hernandez and "Dr. Death" Steve Williams.

In January 1985, he debuted for World Class Championship Wrestling (WCCW), the NWA territory in Dallas, Texas. In April 1985, Michaels went to work for another NWA territory in Kansas City called Central States Wrestling. There, he and tag team partner Marty Jannetty defeated The Batten Twins for the NWA Central States Tag Team Championship, later losing it back to the Battens.

=== Texas All-Star Wrestling (1985–1986) ===
After leaving Kansas City, he returned to Texas to wrestle for Texas All-Star Wrestling (TASW). During his time with TASW, Michaels replaced Nick Kiniski in the American Breed tag team, teaming with Paul Diamond. Michaels and Diamond were awarded the TASW Tag Team Championship by Chavo Guerrero Sr. The team was later renamed American Force. While in TASW, Michaels and Diamond feuded with Japanese Force.

=== American Wrestling Association (1986–1987) ===
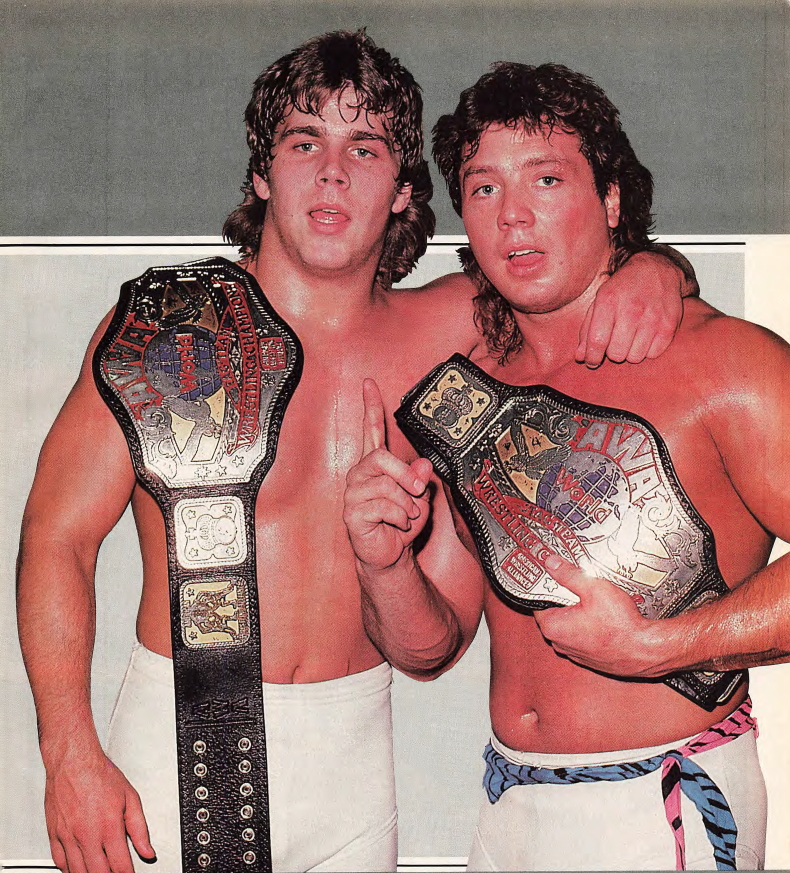
Michaels (left) with Marty Jannetty in 1987, known together as "the (Midnight) Rockers" during their time as AWA World Tag Team Champions

Michaels made his national-level debut, as Sean Michaels, at the age of 20 in the American Wrestling Association (AWA), in a victory over Buddhakhan on ESPN. He was once again teamed with Marty Jannetty, billed as The Midnight Rockers. The Midnight Rockers won the AWA World Tag Team Championship, defeating Doug Somers and Buddy Rose.

=== World Wrestling Federation and return to AWA (1987–1988) ===
In 1987, The Rockers were signed by a competing promotion: the World Wrestling Federation (WWF). They were fired from WWF two weeks later, for a bar incident (a misunderstanding, according to Michaels's autobiography). They then returned to AWA, where they won the AWA tag team titles for a second time, but were re-signed by WWF a year later.

=== Return to the WWF/E ===
==== The Rockers (1988–1992) ====
The Rockers redebuted at a WWF live event on July 7, 1988. Due to WWF chairman Vince McMahon's desire to have his performers carry WWF-exclusive ring names, Michaels and Jannetty were renamed, as simply The Rockers. The team proved popular with both children and women and was a mid-card stalwart of television and pay-per-view shows for the next two years. During this time, Michaels headlined his first pay-per-view for the WWF when The Rockers were involved in the 4-on-4 Survivor Series match main event of Survivor Series on November 23, 1989, which they won.

On October 30, 1990, The Rockers unofficially won the WWF Tag Team Championship from The Hart Foundation (Bret Hart and Jim Neidhart), as Neidhart, half of the championship team, was in the process of negotiating his release from the company. The match was taped with The Rockers winning the title, but soon after Neidhart came to an agreement with management and was rehired. The championship was returned to the Hart Foundation, while the title change was never broadcast or even acknowledged on television (though The Rockers did have a successful title defense on November 3, 1990, against Power and Glory (Hercules and Paul Roma) before the title was returned to the Hart Foundation). When news spread, WWF explained that the original result was void due to a collapsed turnbuckle in the ring during the bout. A buckle had indeed broken, but not to a noticeable or dangerous extent during the match. The Rockers continued their partnership, eventually splitting on December 2, 1991, aired January 11, 1992, on Wrestling Challenge, during an incident on Brutus Beefcake's televised Barber Shop talk show promotional segment. Michaels superkicked Jannetty and threw him through a glass window on the set of Beefcake's talk show. Jannetty returned to the WWF the following year and enjoyed moderate success before leaving the company in 1994, while Michaels became a prominent villain of the early to mid-1990s as "The Boy Toy".

==== Heartbreak Kid (1992–1995) ====
At the suggestion of Curt Hennig, Michaels adopted the nickname "The Heartbreak Kid". Along with his new name came a new gimmick as a vain, cocky villain. He was put together with mirror-carrying manager, Sensational Sherri, who according to the storyline had become infatuated with him. Sherri even sang the first version of his new theme music, "Sexy Boy". During that period, after Michaels had wrestled his scheduled match at live events, his departure was announced with "Shawn Michaels has left the building", alluding to the phrase "Elvis has left the building".

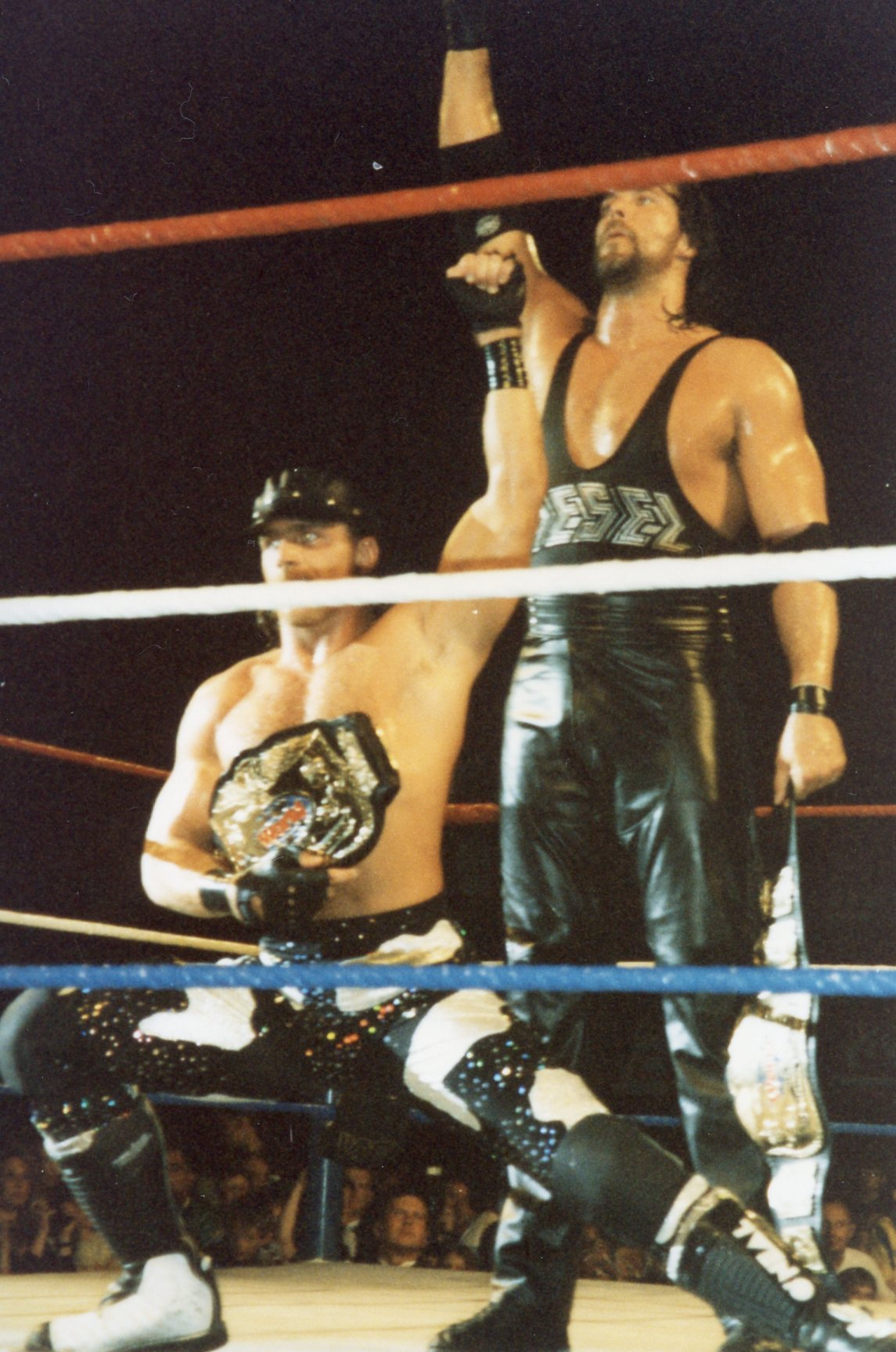
Diesel acted as Michaels's on-air bodyguard and tag team partner for two championship reigns.

At WrestleMania VIII on April 5, 1992, Michaels defeated Tito Santana in his first pay-per-view singles match after both men had simultaneously eliminated each other from that year's Royal Rumble. Michaels subsequently became a contender to the promotion's singles titles and failed to win the WWF Championship from champion Randy Savage in his first opportunity to compete for that title at British event UK Rampage, held on April 19 at the Sheffield Arena and broadcast on Sky Movies Plus (the match later aired in the US on the edition of June 15 of Prime Time Wrestling). Michaels was also unable to win the Intercontinental Championship from Bret Hart in the WWF's first ladder match at a Wrestling Challenge taping on July 21, which was subsequently made available on multiple Coliseum/WWE Home Video releases. However, he won the title from The British Bulldog on Saturday Night's Main Event XXXI, which aired on November 14. He faced Hart for the WWF Championship at Survivor Series on November 25, but lost the match. Originally the secondary main event, Michaels and Hart became the primary main event after The Ultimate Warrior was unable to compete and was replaced by Mr. Perfect (Curt Hennig) in the tag team match that involved Randy Savage against the team of Ric Flair and Razor Ramon. During this time, Michaels and Sherri split and he engaged himself in a feud with former tag team partner Marty Jannetty. Michaels lost the Intercontinental Championship to Jannetty on the May 17, 1993, episode of Raw, but regained it on June 6 with the help of his debuting "bodyguard" (and off-air friend) Diesel.

In September 1993, Michaels was suspended for testing positive for steroid – a charge he never admitted. On WWF programs, his suspension was explained by his having neglected to defend the title often enough. After turning down World Championship Wrestling (WCW)'s advances, Michaels returned to the WWF and made several appearances in the United States Wrestling Association (USWA) during a WWF/USWA cross-promotion. He returned on November 24 at Survivor Series, substituting for Jerry Lawler, who was dealing with legal issues, in a match pitting himself and three of Lawler's "Knights" against the Hart brothers, Bret, Bruce, Keith and Owen.

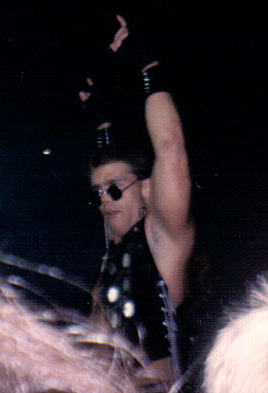
Michaels in 1994

In 1994, Michaels entered a rivalry with Razor Ramon, who had won the vacant Intercontinental Championship during Michaels's absence. Since Michaels had never been defeated in the ring for the title, he claimed to be the rightful champion and even carried around his old title belt. This feud culminated in a ladder match between the two on March 20 at WrestleMania X. Michaels lost the match, which featured both his and Ramon's championship belts suspended above a ladder in the ring. This match was voted by fans as "Match of the Year" by Pro Wrestling Illustrated. It also received a five-star rating from Wrestling Observer Newsletter editor Dave Meltzer. Over the next few months, Michaels battled various injuries and launched the Heartbreak Hotel television talk show segment, mainly shown on Superstars.

On August 28, Michaels and Diesel won the WWF Tag Team Championship from The Headshrinkers (Samu and Fatu). The next day at SummerSlam, Diesel lost the Intercontinental Championship to Ramon when Michaels accidentally superkicked Diesel. This triggered a split between the two, a storyline that was drawn out until Survivor Series on November 24. Michaels won the Royal Rumble on January 22, 1995, which set up a championship grudge match on April 2 at WrestleMania XI against Diesel (who had gone on to win the WWF Championship from Bob Backlund). As part of the storyline, Michaels recruited Sid as his bodyguard for the build-up, lost the match and was attacked by Sid the following night. This would result in him becoming a fan favorite. After this, Michaels took time off

==== Formation of the Kliq (1995–1996) ====
Michaels returned to the ring as a fan favorite in May 1995 and defeated Jeff Jarrett to win his third Intercontinental Championship on July 24 at In Your House 2: The Lumberjacks. This led to a title defense against Razor Ramon on August 27 at SummerSlam in a ladder match, which Michaels won. Around this time, Michaels became the leader of a backstage group known as The Kliq. Critics perceive the group to have sufficient clout with WWF owner Vince McMahon, becoming dominant wrestling figures in the WWF for several years in the mid-1990s, causing friction with other wrestlers. Michaels disputes the perception, saying that McMahon pushed only deserving wrestlers. Michaels's fan base was later nicknamed "The Kliq" as an inside reference to the real "Kliq". In October 1995, Michaels was the victim of a legitimate assault outside a bar in Syracuse, New York. Due to not being able to compete, Michaels was forced to forfeit the Intercontinental Championship to his original opponent Dean Douglas on October 22 at In Your House: Great White North, who in turn Douglas lost the championship to Razor Ramon, another member of the Kliq. During a match with Owen Hart on a November episode of Raw, Hart performed an enzuigiri that struck the back of Michaels's head. They continued the match, but Michaels collapsed in the ring, supposedly because he had suffered a concussion. The concussion was scripted, which was kept from most fans at the time. A retirement angle was written so that Michaels could take some time off after he came back from an injury too soon.

==== WWF Champion (1996–1998) ====
After teasing retirement, Michaels returned to the WWF at the Royal Rumble match on January 21, 1996, winning for the second year in a row to receive a WWF Championship match in the main event at WrestleMania XII. Around this time, Jose Lothario became Michaels's on-screen manager. At WrestleMania XII on March 31, Michaels defeated WWF Champion Bret Hart in the overtime of their sixty-minute Iron Man match, which had ended in a scoreless tie. On May 19, Michaels and his fellow Kliq members were involved in the incident known as "Curtain Call". Diesel and Razor Ramon were about to leave WWF to company rival WCW. After Michaels won a match against Diesel, Ramon and Hunter Hearst Helmsley came to the ring and joined Michaels and Diesel in a group-hug. As Diesel and Helmsley were seen as villains at the time, in contrast to Michaels and Ramon, this constituted a breach of "kayfabe", as acting out of character, which was rare and controversial at the time. As WCW gained momentum due to the signings of Hall and Nash, Michaels held the championship for most of the year. At Survivor Series on November 17, Michaels lost the WWF Championship to Sycho Sid but recaptured the title on January 19, 1997, at Royal Rumble.

On a special episode of Raw dubbed Thursday Raw Thursday, Michaels vacated the WWF Championship. He explained to fans that he was informed by doctors that he had suffered a knee injury. Michaels contemplated thoughts of retirement and stated that he "had to find his smile again", which he had "lost" somewhere down the line. After consulting with Dr. James Andrews, who concluded that he did not need surgery, Michaels underwent four weeks of physical therapy and returned to in-ring action a few months later, briefly teaming with Stone Cold Steve Austin to win the WWF Tag Team Championship. In his autobiography, Michaels discusses his real-life feud with Bret Hart, claiming that Hart did interviews on live television claiming that Michaels was faking his whole injury.

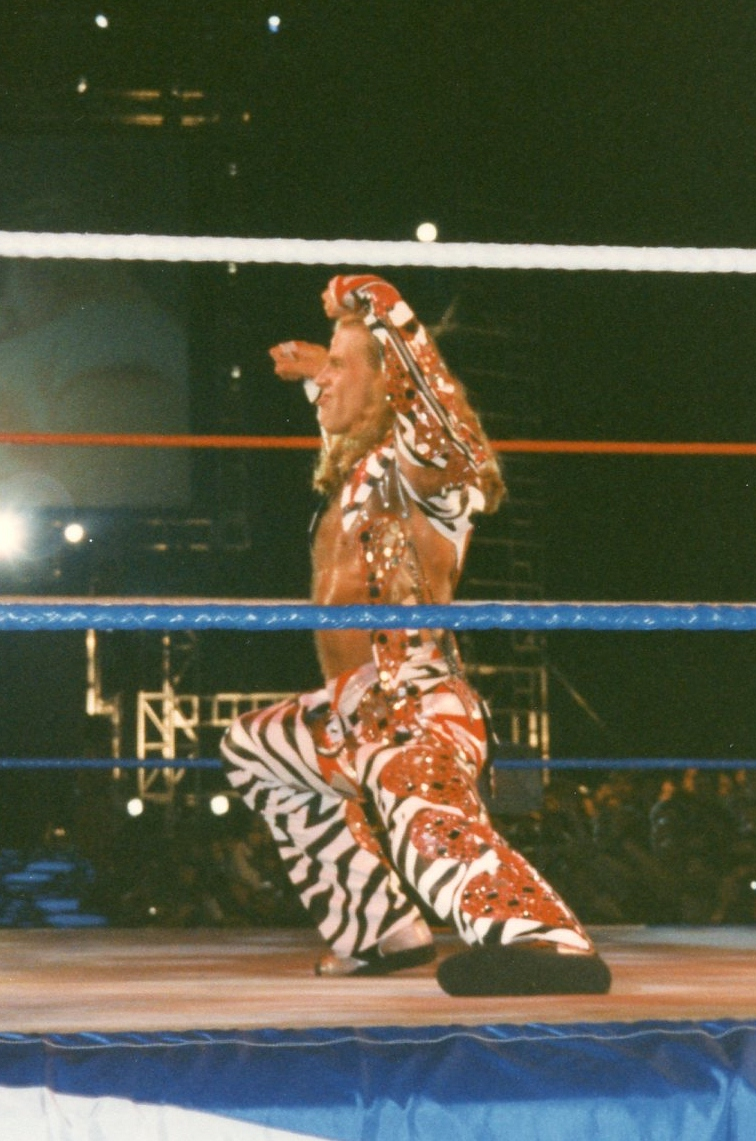
Michaels portrayed his cocky, vain character with colorful outfits.

By the spring of 1997, the real-life backstage conflict between Michaels and Hart was reaching its height. Both men were going out on television and frequently making personal, true to heart remarks about one another. Michaels briefly left the WWF in June of that year after a real backstage fight with Hart, just hours before a Raw Is War show, which allegedly resulted from Michaels making an on-air remark, known as the "Sunny Days" comment, implying that Hart (who was married at the time) was having an affair with Tammy Sytch, a manager and valet who was signed to the WWF as Sunny. Michaels and Austin were still WWF Tag Team Champions at the time during an ongoing feud with the Hart Foundation and a tournament was made to decide new tag team champions. Michaels eventually returned that summer in July. At SummerSlam on August 3, Michaels officiated the WWF Championship match between WWF Champion The Undertaker and Bret Hart. The match ended controversially, with Michaels hitting The Undertaker with a chair (unintentionally, as he was aiming for Hart after he spat in his face). Michaels was then forced to award the championship to his nemesis, Bret Hart. The next night on Raw Is War, signs of a heel turn started to show as Michaels told the WWF fans what happened at SummerSlam was an accident and that he dealt with The Undertaker when the time came. At WWF One Night Only, held in Birmingham, England, on September 20, Michaels defeated The British Bulldog to capture the WWF European Championship. The fans at the event were so upset at the result of the match they booed Michaels out of the building to the extent that they littered the ring with garbage, cementing his second heel turn. With this win, Michaels became the first Grand Slam Champion. At In Your House: Badd Blood on October 5, Michaels defeated The Undertaker in the first Hell in a Cell match, during which Michaels fell off the side of the 5-metre (15 ft) high structure through a table.

In the fall, Michaels joined forces with real-life friend Hunter Hearst Helmsley (later known as Triple H), Helmsley's then real-life girlfriend Chyna, and Rick Rude to form the stable D-Generation X (DX). Michaels continued his rivalry with Bret Hart and his reformed Hart Foundation, which was now a pro-Canada stable. Michaels taunted the group and Canada by engaging in acts such as blowing his nose with and humping the Canadian Flag. Michaels later claimed the flag desecration was Hart's idea. Michaels's feud with the Hart Foundation culminated in a WWF Championship match at Survivor Series on November 9 against Hart. Michaels came out of this match, dubbed by fans the "Montreal Screwjob", as the WWF Champion. Michaels now held both the WWF and European championships at the same time. Michaels dropped the European Championship to DX member Hunter Hearst Hemsley in a farcical match.

==== First retirement and hiatus (1998–2002) ====
On January 18, 1998, at the Royal Rumble, in a casket match against The Undertaker, Michaels took a back body drop to the outside of the ring and hit his lower back on the casket, causing him to herniate two discs and crush one completely. Michaels went on to win the match but the injury rendered him unable to compete on the following month's No Way Out of Texas: In Your House as advertised, and forced him into retirement a night after losing the WWF Championship to Stone Cold Steve Austin on March 29 at WrestleMania XIV.

After being away for nearly four months, Michaels made a surprise return to the WWF as a guest commentator on the July 13 episode of Raw Is War. Michaels continued to make non-wrestling appearances on WWF programming and on November 23 he replaced Sgt. Slaughter as the WWF Commissioner, eventually joining Vince McMahon's group of wrestlers called The Corporation. Throughout late 1998 and early 1999, Michaels made regular television appearances on Raw, in which he scheduled matches, throwing around his authority, and sometimes even deciding the outcome of matches. On the January 4, 1999, episode of Raw Is War, Michaels re-joined DX as a face, but disappeared from WWF television for a few weeks to have back surgery and by the time he returned DX was on the way of dissolving within the next couple of months.

On November 23, 1999, Michaels made a special appearance for Frontier Martial-Arts Wrestling at the 10th Anniversary Show at the Yokohama Arena, serving as the guest referee for the H vs fake Hayabusa (Mr. Gannosuke) main event. He got involved in the match when Gannosuke delivered a low blow on him and he responded later on with Sweet Chin Music.

Michaels made occasional appearances as the WWF Commissioner during the spring and summer of 1999, but remained absent from television after August until May 15, 2000, when he returned on Raw Is War to declare himself the special guest referee for The Rock and Triple H's Iron Man match at Judgment Day. One month later, Michaels briefly reappeared on Raw Is War to hand over the role of Commissioner to Mick Foley. After one more appearance on October 9 cutting a promo with Foley on behalf The Rock, Michaels took a long hiatus from the WWE until June 2002. He was due to return to wrestle in the next year but had to take more than a year off to recover from his drug or painkiller issues, and returned in 2002 after attending a bible study and undergoing a successful rehabilitation treatment. He appeared briefly on television to make a speech at WWF New York during Armageddon on December 10, 2000.

On April 4, 2000, Michaels returned to wrestling for a one-night appearance defeating Paul Diamond in a bunkhouse brawl at Texas Wrestling Entertainment.

Believing that his wrestling career was over, Michaels was interested in training individuals who wanted to become professional wrestlers. He saw potential in using his name and opened the Shawn Michaels Wrestling Academy (later the Texas Wrestling Academy) in 1999, after his lawyer Skip McCormick suggested the idea. Michaels left the academy in 2002, giving co-founder Rudy Boy Gonzalez sole responsibility due to Michaels's new contract with WWE. Michaels was also a sportscaster for San Antonio's local news for a short period during his retirement.

==== Feud with Triple H (2002–2004) ====
On the June 3, 2002 episode of Raw, Michaels returned to WWE television after 18 months of absence when Kevin Nash announced him as a new member of the recently reformed New World Order (nWo). Michaels was the only nWo member to have never worked in WCW. After the nWo had disbanded, Triple H appeared to make amends with Michaels. This was solidified when Michaels pleaded Triple H to return to Raw. Later on, they came down to the ring sporting their DX music and attire. When the pair was about to perform their trademark "Suck It" taunt, Triple H turned on Michaels by performing a Pedigree on him. Continuing the angle, in his first WWE match since WrestleMania XIV, Michaels defeated Triple H at SummerSlam on August 25, but was attacked by Triple H with a sledgehammer after the match. At Survivor Series on November 17, Michaels won the World Heavyweight Championship from Triple H in the first Elimination Chamber match. On December 15 at Armageddon, he lost the championship to Triple H in a Three Stages of Hell match.

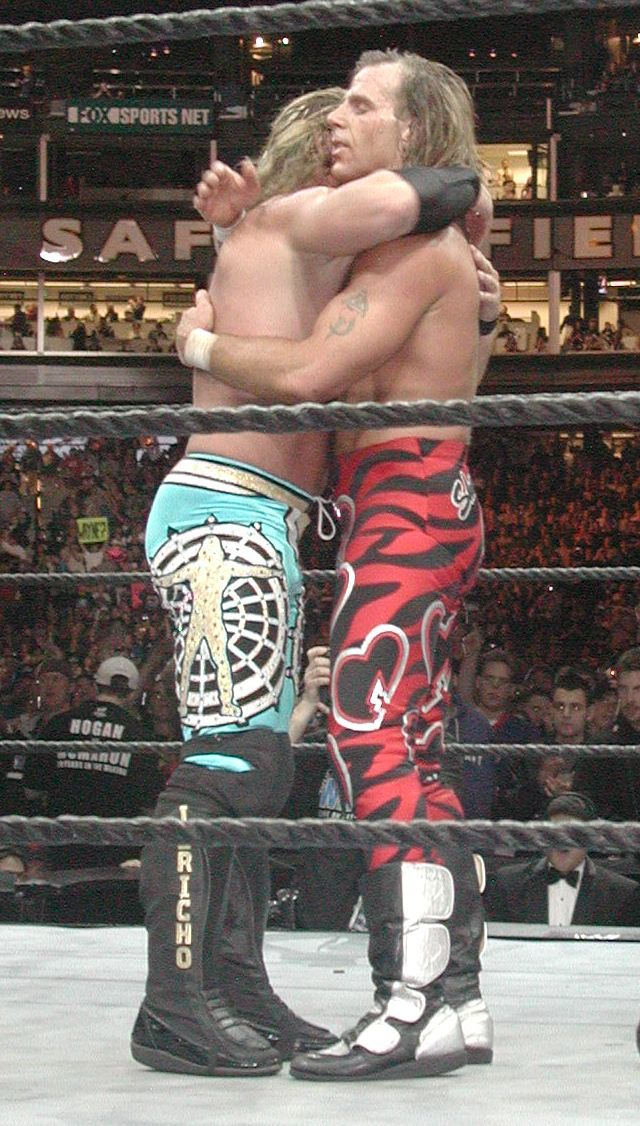
Michaels's match with Chris Jericho at WrestleMania XIX in March 2003 was his first match at a WrestleMania event since WrestleMania XIV in March 1998.

Michaels then began a rivalry with Chris Jericho, after Jericho claimed that he was the next Shawn Michaels. On the January 13, 2003 episode of Raw, after Jericho won a battle royal to select his entry number for the Royal Rumble match, choosing number two in order to start the match with Michaels, who had already been named number one. At the Royal Rumble on January 19, Jericho, with the help of Christian, eliminated Michaels. Michaels later interfered in the match, causing Jericho to be eliminated. Michaels defeated Jericho on March 30 at WrestleMania XIX but was low-blowed after hugging Jericho.

At Backlash on April 27, Michaels teamed with Booker T and Kevin Nash and lost to the team of Jericho, Triple H and Ric Flair in a 6-man tag team match. This led to a match between Michaels and Flair at Bad Blood on June 15, which Flair won. Following this, Michaels continued feuding with the members of Triple H's faction Evolution. He was unsuccessful in capturing the World Heavyweight Championship at SummerSlam on August 24 with Triple H retaining in the second Elimination Chamber match. He then lost to Randy Orton at Unforgiven on September 21. At Armageddon on December 14, Michaels defeated the group's enforcer Batista.

On the December 29 episode of Raw, Michaels seemingly defeated Triple H after a Sweet Chin Music for the World Heavyweight Championship in his hometown of San Antonio, Texas, with Eric Bischoff as the special guest referee (Earl Hebner originally refereed the match, only to be knocked out by Triple H in the middle of the match). However, Bischoff reversed the decision due to both men's shoulders being on the mat. Angered by this, Michaels attacked Ric Flair and Bischoff. He was subsequently fired by Bischoff but rehired by Stone Cold Steve Austin.

As a part of an ongoing feud with Triple H, the two competed alongside Chris Benoit in the main event on March 14, 2004, at WrestleMania XX for the World Heavyweight Championship, which Benoit won. The night before this, Michaels inducted Tito Santana in the WWE Hall of Fame. A triple threat WrestleMania rematch for the title took place on April 18 at Backlash, where Benoit successfully retained it after forcing Michaels to submit to a Sharpshooter. Due to the "Montreal Screwjob" incident, the Edmonton crowd booed Michaels, with chants of "You screwed Bret!" being heard during his match at Backlash. At Bad Blood on June 13, Michaels lost to Triple H in the longest Hell in a Cell match in history. Four months later, he lost a World Heavyweight Championship match against Triple H, after Edge interfered on October 19 at Taboo Tuesday, when the fans voted for him ahead of Edge and Chris Benoit to face Triple H one more time. Following this, Michaels was out of action for a few months with a legit torn meniscus.

==== D-Generation X reunion (2005–2007) ====
At the Royal Rumble on January 30, 2005, after losing to Edge, Michaels competed in the Royal Rumble match and eliminated Kurt Angle. In seeking revenge, Angle re-entered the ring and eliminated Michaels, and thus placed him in an ankle lock submission hold, outside the ring. Michaels issued a challenge to Angle for a match at WrestleMania 21, which Angle accepted when he appeared on Raw to attack Michaels. The following week on Raw, Marty Jannetty and Michaels had a one time reunion as The Rockers and defeated La Résistance (Robért Conway and Sylvain Grenier). Three days later on SmackDown!, Angle defeated Jannetty, after Angle made Jannetty submit to the ankle lock. To send a "message" to Michaels, Angle also humiliated Michaels's former manager, Sensational Sherri, when he applied the ankle lock hold on her. At WrestleMania on April 3, Angle defeated Michaels by submission, again with an ankle lock.

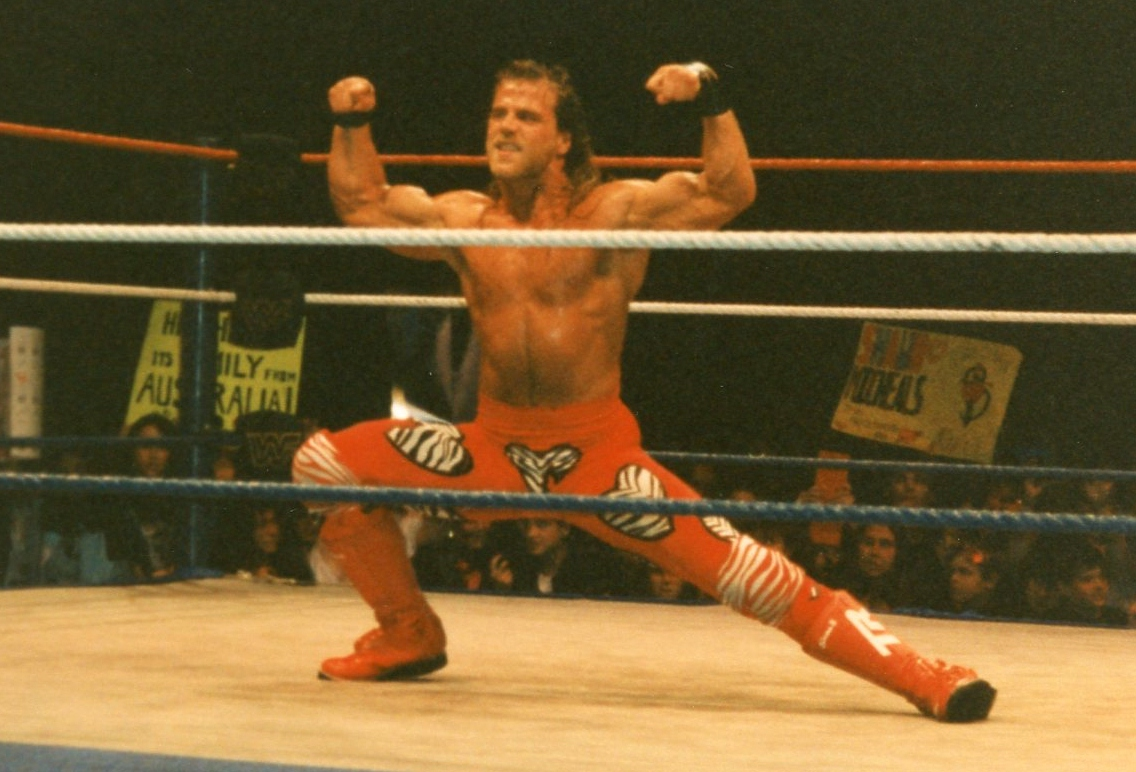
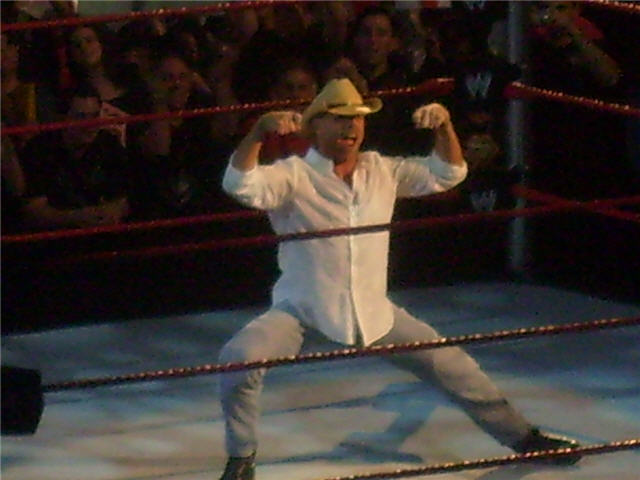
Michaels performing his signature pose, pictured in 1995 and 2008

The next night on Raw, Muhammad Hassan and Daivari came out to confront and assault Michaels. On the April 11 episode of Raw, Michaels approached General Manager Eric Bischoff, in which he demanded a handicap match with Hassan and Daivari. Bischoff refused to schedule such a match and instead told Michaels to find a partner. Michaels then made a plea for Hulk Hogan to come back and team with him. On the April 18 episode of Raw, Hassan again led an attack on Michaels until Hogan appeared to save Michaels and accept his offer. At Backlash on May 1, Hogan and Michaels defeated Hassan and Daivari. Later, in a WrestleMania rematch, Michaels defeated Kurt Angle (who was drafted to Raw in the draft lottery) on June 26 at Vengeance. On the July 4 episode of Raw, after defeating Carlito and Kurt Angle, Michaels hit Hogan with his Sweet Chin Music, knocking Hogan to the ground and turning heel. The following week on Raw, Michaels appeared on Piper's Pit where he superkicked Roddy Piper and then challenged Hogan to a match at SummerSlam, which Hogan accepted the following week. Hogan defeated Michaels at SummerSlam on August 21, and after the match Michaels extended his hand to him, saying "I needed to know, and I found out" and he and Hogan shook hands. Michaels left the ring to allow Hogan to celebrate with the crowd, turning face once again. He became the first person to cleanly defeat Chris Masters on September 18 at Unforgiven with Sweet Chin Music. On the October 3 WWE Homecoming episode of Raw, he wrestled old rival Kurt Angle to a 2–2 draw in a 30-Minute Iron Man match. Afterwards, he challenged Angle to sudden-death overtime, but Angle refused and walked out. He was part of Team Raw at Survivor Series on November 27, but lost the match to Team SmackDown!.

On the December 26 episode of Raw, Vince McMahon lauded Michaels for his part in the "Montreal Screwjob". Michaels said he was only being loyal to his company, he had moved on, and McMahon should move on as well. McMahon then began setting unusual stipulations for Michaels' matches and interfering on behalf of Michaels' opponents. On January 29, 2006, at the Royal Rumble, McMahon made his way to the ring, and as Michaels stared at McMahon, Shane McMahon made a surprise appearance to eliminate Michaels. On the February 13 episode of Raw, McMahon unsuccessfully forced Michaels to sign retirement papers. The following week, Michaels won a handicap match against the Spirit Squad (Kenny, Johnny, Mitch, Nicky and Mikey), after which Michaels's former partner, Marty Jannetty, saved him from the assault by the Spirit Squad. After the two reunited, McMahon offered Jannetty a contract if he "kissed his ass." The following week, Jannetty refused McMahon's offer and instead took Chris Masters's "Masterlock challenge." Michaels tried to help Jannetty, which ultimately resulted in Shane attacking Michaels and forcing him to kiss his father's behind. On March 18 at Saturday Night's Main Event XXXII, Shane defeated Michaels in a Street Fight after he applied a sharpshooter on Michaels, leading to McMahon ordering for the bell to be rung though Michaels did not submit, which was an allusion to the "Montreal Screwjob". Despite interference from the Spirit Squad and Shane, Michaels defeated McMahon on April 2 at WrestleMania 22 in a No Holds Barred match. At Backlash on April 30, The McMahons (Vince and Shane) defeated Michaels and "God" with help from the Spirit Squad in a no disqualification tag team match. On the May 22 episode of Raw, the Spirit Squad was scripted to injure Michaels's knee. This angle was written so Michaels could have surgery on his knee, which had been legitimately injured for some time.

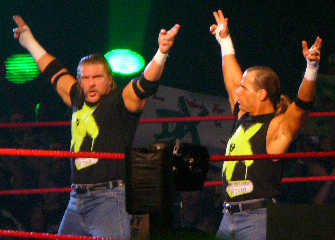
Triple H and Michaels as DX in 2006

In 2006, a series of events took place which suggested a reunion of Michaels and Triple H as DX. They began at WrestleMania 22, where both Michaels and Triple H performed the crotch chop during their matches. On Raw, the two continued to deliver chops, as Michaels feuded with Vince McMahon and Triple H went to challenge John Cena for the WWE Championship, repeatedly butting heads with Vince McMahon in the process. On the June 12 episode of Raw, DX officially reunited. During Triple H's gauntlet match, which had him compete against the Spirit Squad. Michaels came in to help Triple H, and the two did the DX "crotch chops." On June 25 at Vengeance, DX defeated the Spirit Squad in a 5–on–2 handicap match. They also defeated the Spirit Squad on July 15 at Saturday Night's Main Event XXXIII in a 5-on-2 elimination match and defeated The McMahons on August 20 at SummerSlam. At Unforgiven on September 17, DX defeated the McMahons and ECW World Champion The Big Show in a Hell in a Cell match, ending the feud.

At Cyber Sunday on November 5, DX lost to Rated-RKO (Edge and Randy Orton) after fan-selected referee Eric Bischoff allowed the illegal use of a steel chair to give Rated-RKO the ill-gotten win and the plaudit of being the first tag team to defeat DX in a tag team match since their reformation in June 2006. On November 26 at Survivor Series, Team DX emerged victorious against Team Rated-RKO in a clean sweep victory. At New Year's Revolution on January 7, 2007, Triple H suffered a legit torn right quadriceps during their match with Rated-RKO. Rated-RKO claimed victory over DX, citing Triple H's injury, as the "end" of DX. On the January 15 episode of Raw, Michaels lived up to his word of "dealing" with Rated-RKO, from his comments the previous week before, when he took out Randy Orton with a con-chair-to after a handicap match against Edge and Orton. At the Royal Rumble on January 28, Michaels was the last man eliminated in the Royal Rumble match by the winner of the match, The Undertaker.

==== Various feuds and championship pursuits (2007–2009) ====
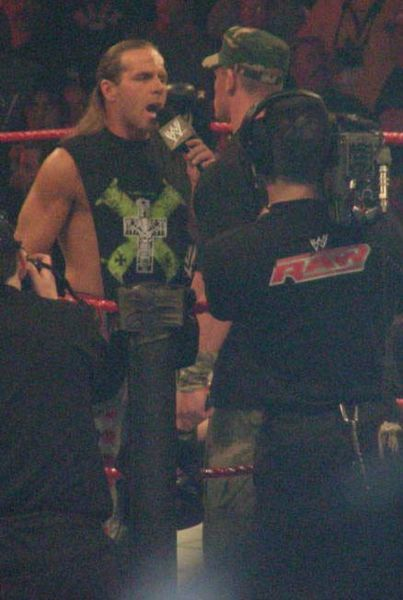
Michaels confronting John Cena on an episode of Raw in 2007

On the January 29 episode of Raw, Michaels captured the World Tag Team Championship with WWE Champion John Cena after defeating Rated-RKO. At WrestleMania 23 on April 1, Cena retained the WWE Championship against Michaels after making him submit to the STFU. The next night on Raw, Michaels and Cena competed in two back-to-back ten team battle royals, winning the first and losing the World Tag Team Championship in the second to The Hardys (Matt and Jeff) when Michaels threw Cena over the top rope. Michaels faced off with Cena, Edge and Randy Orton in a fatal four-way match on April 29 at Backlash for the WWE Championship, where Cena retained the title after Michaels performed Sweet Chin Music on Cena, causing him to fall on Orton for the pinfall.

Michaels then entered a feud with Randy Orton when Orton claimed that he could beat Michaels. The week before their scheduled match on May 20 at Judgment Day, after Michaels won a match against then-World Heavyweight Champion Edge, Orton attacked him by punting Michaels in the head. Orton assaulted Michaels again prior to their match at Judgment Day, interrupting Michaels's interview segment. Michaels collapsed during their match, causing Orton to win by referee stoppage. Orton continued the beating and performed an RKO to a fallen Michaels, who was removed out of the ring in a stretcher. During the feud, Michaels suffered a storyline concussion. This injury was used to keep Michaels out of action, as he required surgery for his knee. Michaels made his return on the October 8 episode of Raw, performing Sweet Chin Music to newly crowned WWE Champion Randy Orton during his title ceremony at the end of the show and then celebrating over the knocked-out champion as Vince McMahon watched. On October 28 at Cyber Sunday, Michaels was voted by the fans to face Orton for the WWE Championship, though he won via disqualification when Orton hit Michaels with a low blow, which resulted in Orton retaining the championship. Michaels got another opportunity at the WWE Championship, when he was granted his rematch against Orton on November 18 at Survivor Series. In their match, Michaels was banned from using Sweet Chin Music upon request by Orton, referring to as Michaels superkicking Orton week after week. Michaels lost the match, when Orton performed an RKO for the win, which ended their feud.

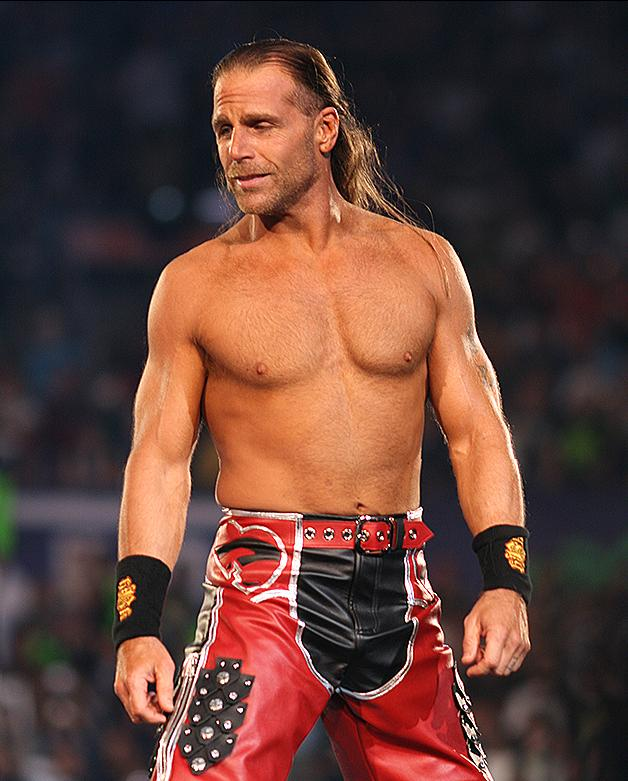
Michaels looking at the crowd at WrestleMania XXIV before his match with Ric Flair

Michaels defeated and ended Ric Flair's career in a Career Threatening match on March 30, 2008, at WrestleMania XXIV. Afterwards, Batista confronted Michaels about his actions at WrestleMania, calling him selfish and egotistical. On April 27 at Backlash, with Chris Jericho as the guest referee, Michaels defeated Batista. Jericho then confronted Michaels, in which he admitted to faking a knee injury in order to defeat Batista. Michaels defeated Jericho on May 18 at Judgment Day. At One Night Stand on June 1, Michaels lost to Batista in a stretcher match. On the June 9 episode of Raw, Michaels was attacked by Chris Jericho during his talk show segment, The Highlight Reel, being thrown directly through a television screen. The following week, it was revealed that, within the context of the storyline, Michaels had suffered a detached retina. On July 20 at The Great American Bash, Jericho defeated Michaels by referee stoppage after assaulting Michaels's eyes.

At SummerSlam on August 17, Michaels announced his retirement from professional wrestling. That night, Jericho punched Michaels's wife in the face. On the August 25 episode of Raw, Michaels renounced his retirement and challenged Jericho to an unsanctioned match at Unforgiven on September 7, which Jericho accepted. The next week, they had a contract signing for the match and were involved in a brawl, causing a legitimate small triceps tear for Michaels. He was medically cleared to compete at Unforgiven, and beat Jericho so severely that the referee called the match, making Michaels the winner. Later that night, Jericho replaced CM Punk in the World Heavyweight Championship scramble match, and won the title. On October 5 at No Mercy, Michaels was defeated by Jericho in a ladder match for the World Heavyweight Championship.

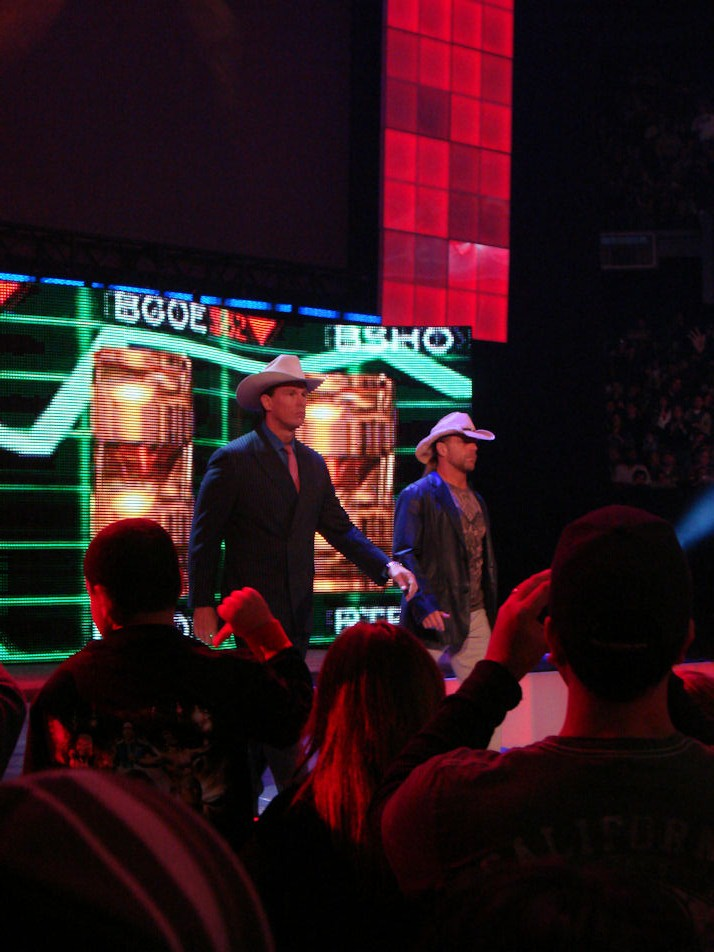
Shawn Michaels feuded with John Bradshaw Layfield in early 2009.

At Armageddon on December 14, having lost his family's savings due to the global recession, Michaels grudgingly accepted a one-year general employment contract from John "Bradshaw" Layfield (JBL). After failing to help JBL win the World Heavyweight Championship from John Cena on January 25, 2009, at the Royal Rumble, and being derided for it, Michaels agreed to face JBL in "All or Nothing" match at No Way Out on February 15, which Michaels won thus letting him out of his contract early while still receiving full payment.

On the March 2 episode of Raw, Michaels became the first person to defeat Vladimir Kozlov, and so earned a match with The Undertaker at WrestleMania 25 on April 5, which he lost thus extending The Undertaker's WrestleMania winning streak to 17–0. Their match was highly acclaimed by critics and audiences alike and is now considered by many to be one of the greatest WrestleMania matches of all time. After WrestleMania, Michaels took a four-month hiatus from WWE.

==== Final matches and second retirement (2009–2010) ====
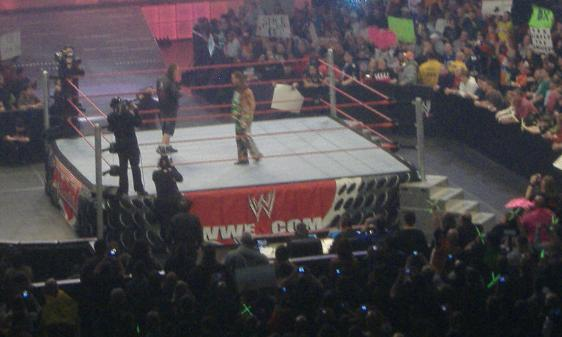
Michaels reconciles with Bret Hart in January 2010.

Michaels returned to WWE programming in a series of segments that aired on the August 10 episode of Raw, where he had, in storyline, left the WWE. Triple H met with Michaels at an office cafeteria in Texas where he was working as a chef; throughout the segments, Triple H tried to convince Michaels to return to WWE and reform DX. After several incidents during the segments, Michaels agreed to team with Triple H to face The Legacy (Cody Rhodes and Ted DiBiase) at SummerSlam on August 23, where DX defeated Legacy. At TLC: Tables, Ladders and Chairs on December 13, DX defeated Jeri-Show (Chris Jericho and Big Show) to win the Unified WWE Tag Team Championship in a Tables, Ladders, and Chairs match (TLC). On the January 4, 2010, episode of Raw, Michaels buried the hatchet with long-time rival Bret Hart, as they shook hands and hugged in the ring. In contrast to the storylines featured on the show, this was in fact a legitimate reconciliation which laid to rest animosities surrounding the Montreal Screwjob. While some cast doubts on its sincerity, both men have confirmed that it was indeed genuine. DX lost the Unified WWE Tag Team Championship in a triple threat match to the team of The Miz and Big Show on the February 8 episode of Raw; the match also included The Straight Edge Society (CM Punk and Luke Gallows). On February 21 at Elimination Chamber, Michaels cost The Undertaker the World Heavyweight Championship in the main event. At WrestleMania XXVI on March 28, Michaels lost to The Undertaker and, as a result, he was forced to retire due to the match stipulation, the same way Michaels ended Ric Flair's career. The following night, on the March 29 episode of Raw, Michaels gave an emotional farewell speech, departing with the familiar sentence, "Shawn Michaels has left the building."

In an interview with Bill Simmons of ESPN.com shortly after his retirement, Michaels stated that his decision to retire came a month before WrestleMania 25, when a backstage employee asked about his son Cameron, and, in response to Shawn telling the employee that he'd just turned nine, the employee said that he was "halfway gone"; meaning that he was halfway to his eighteenth birthday, and after that, he'd be "gone". The statement affected Michaels deeply; he did not want to be absent when his son left home, so he decided that year would be his last year as an active wrestler.

==== WWE Hall of Fame and sporadic appearances (2010–2018) ====
On the December 13 episode of Raw, Michaels won the Slammy Award for Moment of the Year for his match against The Undertaker at WrestleMania XXVI and accepted it via satellite. Three days later, he announced a long-term deal with WWE, where he would serve in an ambassadorial role. Michaels made his in-person television return at the December 11 Tribute to the Troops taping, where he and Triple H had a one-night only DX reunion.

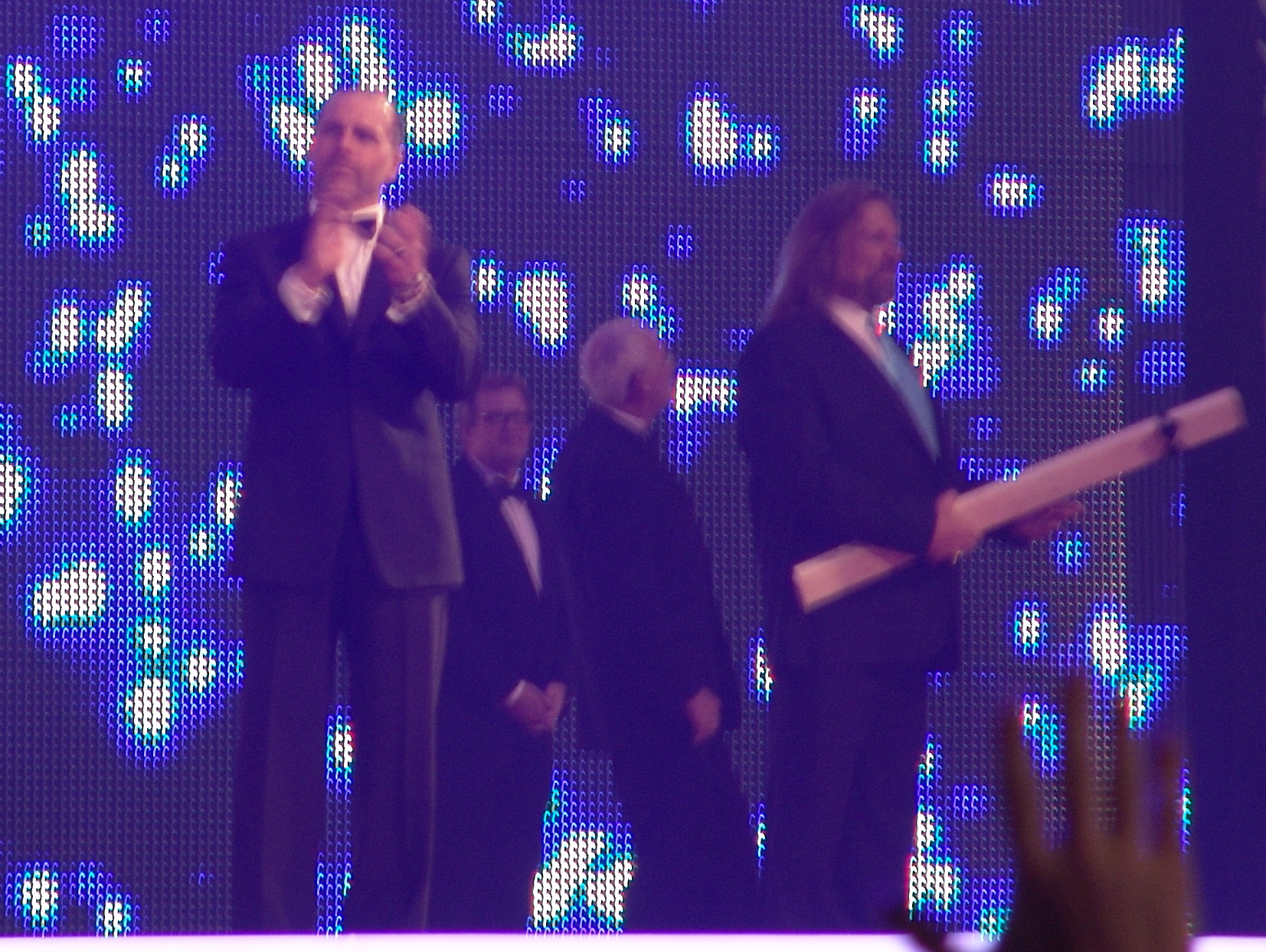
Michaels at WrestleMania XXVII, with other 2011 WWE Hall of Fame inductees

Michaels appeared on the January 10, 2011, episode of Raw, where he was announced as a WWE Hall of Fame class of 2011 inductee. After being ridiculed by Alberto Del Rio later that night, Michaels hit Del Rio with Sweet Chin Music. On the March 28 episode of Raw, Michaels addressed Triple H and The Undertaker about their match at WrestleMania XXVII. Michaels was inducted into the WWE Hall of Fame on April 2 by Triple H. They were also joined by fellow Kliq members Kevin Nash (who had returned to WWE for the Royal Rumble) and Sean Waltman. He returned on the June 27 episode of Raw, where he was confronted by CM Punk, and superkicked David Otunga and Michael McGillicutty. Later that night, when Diamond Dallas Page's special appearance was interrupted by Drew McIntyre, he superkicked McIntyre.

In June 2011, Jim Ross, Michaels and Hart announced that the three were working on a DVD chronicling the careers of Hart and Michaels that the WWE was planning to release in October 2011. The subject of the DVD was their on-screen rivalry and real-life conflicts, with a particular focus on the Montreal Screwjob. In his tweet, Hart described working on the DVD as a "cathartic" experience, and Ross asserted that both Hart and Michaels had been very honest and emotional in their interviews. The DVD, Shawn Michaels vs Bret Hart: WWE's Greatest Rivalries, was released in November 2011.

On the February 13, 2012, episode of Raw SuperShow, Michaels confronted Triple H about accepting The Undertaker's challenge for a Hell in a Cell match on April 1 at WrestleMania XXVIII, and announced he would be the special guest referee for it. Michaels appeared on the August 6 episode of Raw where he was confronted by Brock Lesnar, who (kayfabe) broke Michaels's arm after putting it in a Kimura Lock the following week. On the April 1, 2013, episode of Raw, Michaels returned to offer to corner Triple H in his match with Brock Lesnar on April 7 at WrestleMania 29. During that match, Michaels superkicked an interfering Paul Heyman, helping Triple H win and keep his job.

At Hell in a Cell on October 27, Michaels served as the special guest referee for the vacant WWE Championship Hell in a Cell match between Daniel Bryan and Randy Orton, performing Sweet Chin Music on Bryan so Orton could win.

On April 3, 2016, at WrestleMania 32, Michaels made an appearance during the event in his in-ring attire, confronting The League of Nations alongside Mick Foley and Stone Cold Steve Austin, where Michaels delivered Sweet Chin Music to Alberto Del Rio and King Barrett before celebrating with Foley, Austin and The New Day. In late 2016, Michaels became a trainer at the WWE Performance Center. According to Pro Wrestling Torch in 2017, Michaels along with Terry Taylor teach the finishing class at the Performance Center, the last of four levels of classes. He appeared on the January 9, 2017, episode of Raw to promote his new film. He was then confronted by Rusev, Lana and Jinder Mahal, before Enzo Amore and Big Cass came to Michaels's side, leading to a match between Big Cass and Mahal, which Cass won after Michaels superkicked Rusev at ringside, distracting Mahal. On the March 13 episode of Raw, Michaels gave Roman Reigns advice about The Undertaker for their match at WrestleMania 33, before Braun Strowman attacked Reigns on the entrance ramp. He was one of the many WWE legends who appeared on the January 22, 2018, episode of Raw 25 Years.

At Super Show-Down on October 6, Michaels assisted Triple H in defeating The Undertaker, after which, he was attacked by The Undertaker and Kane. On the following episode of Raw, Michaels appeared with Triple H, announcing that he was coming out of retirement for one final match and reforming D-Generation X. On November 2 at Crown Jewel, D-Generation X defeated The Brothers of Destruction. The match was poorly received by fans and critics alike, winning the Wrestling Observer Newsletter's "Worst Match of the Year" award, although PWTorch's Wade Keller considered that "Michaels shows glimpses and didn't embarrass himself".

==== NXT and corporate roles (2018–present) ====
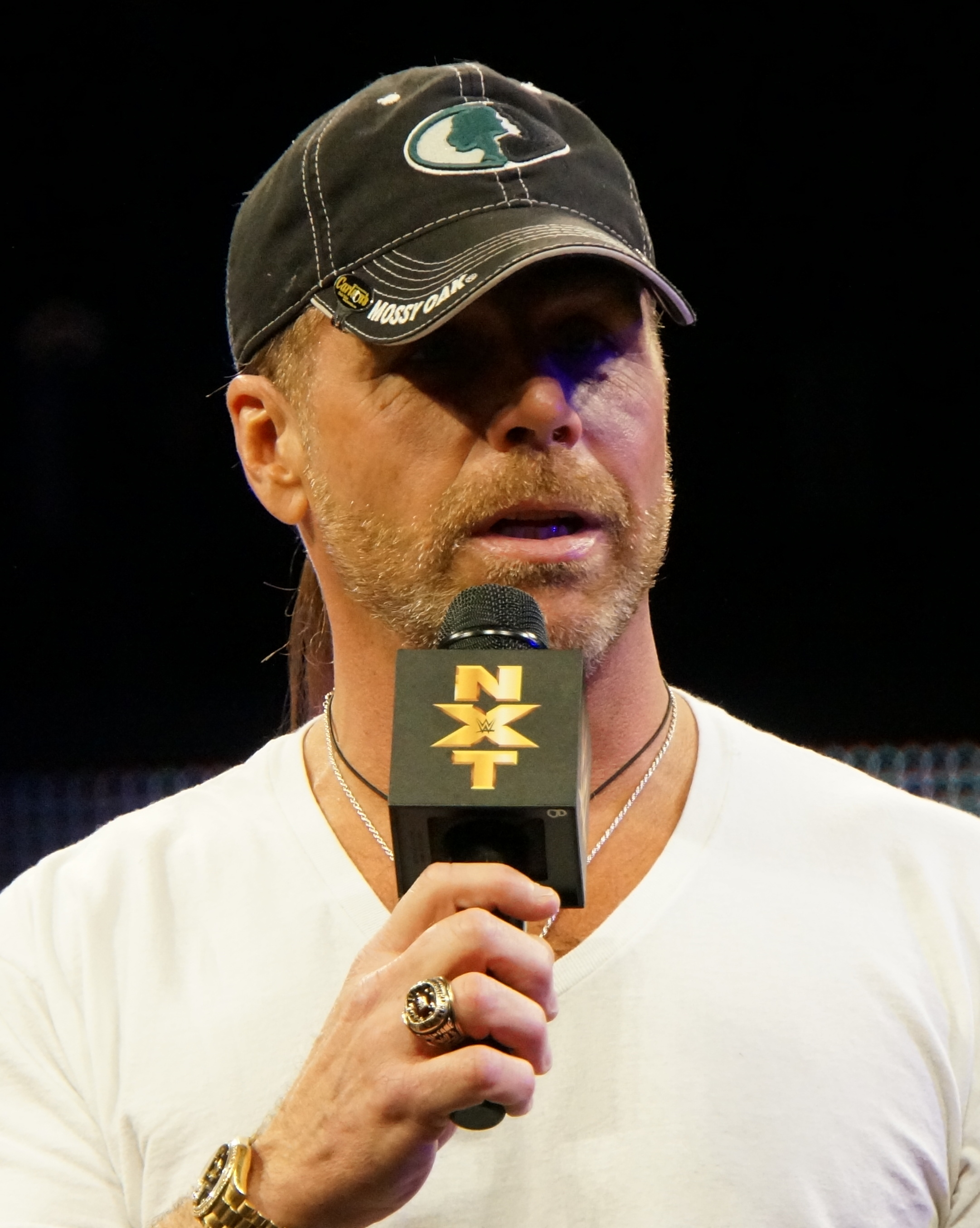
Michaels on an episode of NXT in 2014

In November 2018, Michaels announced he was officially working as a writer and producer on WWE's NXT brand and show, under former D-Generation X cohort Paul Levesque. In April 2019, Michaels was inducted into the WWE Hall of Fame for a second time, this time as a member of D-Generation X. He appeared at Survivor Series on November 22, 2020, during The Undertaker's retirement ceremony. In September 2021, Levesque stepped away from the brand after experiencing a "cardiac incident". Michaels, in his role as Vice President of Talent Development, took over responsibility for the running of the NXT shows. In September 2022, his job title was confirmed as Senior Vice President of Talent Development Creative, responsible for both creative and development at NXT, and for the expansion of NXT UK into NXT Europe in 2023.

On January 23, 2023, at Raw is XXX, Michaels again reunited with D-Generation X (without Billy Gunn, as he was no longer under contract with WWE) until they and Kurt Angle were confronted by Imperium (Gunther, Ludwig Kaiser, and Giovanni Vinci).

== Legacy ==
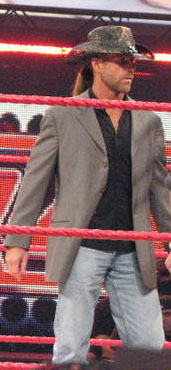
Michaels in 2008

Michaels is widely regarded as one of the greatest professional wrestlers of all time by both his peers and critics. Ric Flair has called Michaels the greatest in-ring performer in WWE history.

Michaels has received wide acclaim for several of his in-ring performances, earning a combined 15 Match of the Year awards from Pro Wrestling Illustrated and the Wrestling Observer Newsletter. His match against Ric Flair at WrestleMania 24 was named Match of the Decade by Pro Wrestling Illustrated, while critic Dave Meltzer awarded him with two five-star matches over the course of his career: the ladder match against Razor Ramon at WrestleMania X and the inaugural Hell in a Cell match against The Undertaker at Bad Blood 1997. His match against The Undertaker at WrestleMania 25 in 2009 was named by WWE itself as the greatest match in WrestleMania history.

Following a series of acclaimed performances at WrestleMania, Michaels became widely known as Mr. WrestleMania. Sumit Rehal of Independent ranked three of Michaels’ matches among the top ten WrestleMania matches of all time: versus Razor Ramon at WrestleMania X, versus Bret Hart at WrestleMania XII, and versus The Undertaker at WrestleMania XXV. In 2016, Dave Richard of CBS Sports ranked Michaels’ match against Steve Austin at WrestleMania XIV as the greatest main event in WrestleMania history.

His rivalry with Bret Hart has been widely recognized as one of the greatest in WWE history.

Michaels' near-hour-long match with John Cena on the April 23, 2007 episode of Monday Night Raw is frequently cited as the greatest match in the show's history.

Michaels has been cited as an influence by several wrestlers, including Chris Jericho, Kevin Owens, Seth Rollins, Johnny Gargano, and Adam Cole, among others.

== Personal life ==
Hickenbottom's first marriage, to Theresa Wood, soon ended in an amicably settled divorce. He married Rebecca Curci, a former WCW Nitro Girl known as Whisper, at the Graceland Wedding Chapel in Las Vegas on March 31, 1999. Only the couple and an Elvis impersonator were present. They have a son named Cameron Kade (born January 15, 2000) and a daughter named Cheyenne (born August 19, 2004).

In 1996, Hickenbottom posed for a non-nude layout in Playgirl. Only after he posed did he discover Playgirl has a mostly homosexual readership, for which some of his fellow wrestlers teased him.

Hickenbottom is ambidextrous, using his left hand for writing and his right hand for drawing. As a wrestler, he typically kicked with his right leg when performing his finishing move, but used either arm for his signature elbow drop. He had trouble differentiating between right and left, which affected his football games as a child.

In 1987, Hickenbottom developed a pattern of "heavy" substance abuse, which eventually alienated some of his closest friends, and may have explained his reputation for being difficult to work with during the 1990s. He contemplated suicide in the late 1980s, and suggested that psychological intervention was "probably sorely needed" by the late 1990s. His wife Rebecca observed, "There was something in him that he despised, and he was self-destructing." He abandoned his drink-and-drugs lifestyle in 2002 out of fear that he would negatively influence his then two-year-old son.

Hickenbottom became a born-again Christian on April 24, 2002. He was raised a Catholic, but became a non-denominational Christian because of his wife's beliefs. His later ring attire often incorporated cross symbols and he made a praying gesture on his knees during ring entrances. He was in the audience for a televised service of John Hagee's Cornerstone Church in his hometown of San Antonio, where he is also a Bible teacher. In 2008, he appeared on a Trinity Broadcasting Network program with fellow wrestler Sting.

== Other media ==
=== Television ===
Michaels was the host of the outdoor television show, Shawn Michaels' MacMillan River Adventures, in which he and his longtime friend, Keith Mark, owner and operator of the original MacMillan River Adventures camp in Yukon, Canada, hunted big-game animals around the world. This series aired on CarbonTV.

=== HBK Line ===
During their 2015–16 season, the Pittsburgh Penguins of the National Hockey League named a line, consisting of Carl Hagelin, Nick Bonino and Phil Kessel, the "HBK Line" due to the fact that the trio's first initials, of their last names, recall Michaels's "Heartbreak Kid" moniker. Pens' game-day staff would regularly play Michaels's theme "Sexy Boy" over the Consol Energy Center PA system after goals or excellent shifts by line members.

After weeks of having fun with Penguins fans on Twitter, the team officially invited Michaels for their Eastern Conference Finals Game 5 matchup with the Tampa Bay Lightning (whose fanbase contains a sizable number of pro wrestlers, including Hulk Hogan and Titus O'Neil, due to Tampa long being a home base for many wrestlers), upon which Michaels accepted. Michaels met with Penguins' owner Mario Lemieux and sat with former Pittsburgh Steelers's defensive lineman Brett Keisel during the game. Keisel also gave Michaels a tour of the city including at the Steelers headquarters and having lunch at Primanti Brothers in the city's Strip District. The Penguins lost the game in overtime 4–3 but went on to defeat the Lightning in the series and advance to the Stanley Cup Finals, eventually defeating the San Jose Sharks for the Stanley Cup.

Outside of his numerous appearances with WWE, it was not Michaels first visit to Pittsburgh. In 2013, he appeared at the opening of the first Field & Stream store in suburban Cranberry Township.

While the Penguins successfully defended their Stanley Cup championship the following year, the HBK Line was broken up when Kessel was moved to the 2nd line with Evgeni Malkin and Bonino left the team in free agency.

=== Book ===
On February 10, 2015, Hickenbottom published an autobiography entitled Wrestling for My Life: The Legend, the Reality, and the Faith of a WWE Superstar. It was co-written by David Thomas.

- The Unauthorized History of DX. Triple H; Shawn Michaels; Aaron Williams (2009). WWE Books.

== Filmography ==
Film
Year	Title	Role	Notes
2017	The Resurrection of Gavin Stone	Doug	Debut
2017	Pure Country: Pure Heart	Ted	
2018	Avengers of Justice: Farce Wars	Incredible Master Yoga	
2018	The Marine 6: Close Quarters	Luke Trapper	
2019	90 Feet from Home	James Devine	

Television
Year	Title	Role	Notes
1996	Baywatch	Vinnie	1 episode
1999	Pacific Blue	Michael Shane	2 episodes

== Video games ==
WWE video games
Year	Title	Notes
1992	WWF Super WrestleMania	Video game debut Shawn was featured in the Sega Genesis version of the game, but was not in the SNES version
1992	WWF WrestleMania: Steel Cage Challenge	
1993	WWF Royal Rumble	Cover athlete
1993	WWF King of the Ring	
1993	WWF Rage in the Cage	Cover athlete
1994	WWF Raw	
1995	WWF WrestleMania: The Arcade Game	Cover athlete
1996	WWF In Your House	Cover athlete
1998	WWF War Zone	
1999	WWF Attitude	
1999	WWF WrestleMania 2000	
2000	WWF No Mercy	
2000	WWF SmackDown! 2: Know Your Role	
2002	WWE SmackDown! Shut Your Mouth	
2003	WWE WrestleMania XIX	
2003	WWE Raw 2	
2003	WWE SmackDown! Here Comes the Pain	
2004	WWE Day of Reckoning	
2004	WWE Survivor Series	
2004	WWE SmackDown! vs. Raw	
2005	WWE WrestleMania 21	
2005	WWE Day of Reckoning 2	
2005	WWE SmackDown! vs. Raw 2006	
2006	WWE SmackDown vs. Raw 2007	
2007	WWE SmackDown vs. Raw 2008	
2008	WWE SmackDown vs. Raw 2009	Cover athlete
2009	WWE Legends of WrestleMania	
2009	WWE SmackDown vs. Raw 2010	
2010	WWE SmackDown vs. Raw 2011	
2011	WWE All Stars	
2011	WWE '12	
2012	WWE WrestleFest	
2012	WWE '13	
2013	WWE 2K14	
2014	WWE SuperCard	
2014	WWE 2K15	
2015	WWE 2K16	
2016	WWE 2K17	
2017	WWE Tap Mania	
2017	WWE 2K18	
2017	WWE Mayhem	
2018	WWE 2K19	
2019	WWE 2K20	
2020	WWE 2K Battlegrounds	
2022	WWE 2K22	
2023	WWE 2K23	
2024	WWE 2K24	
2025	WWE 2K25	
2026	WWE 2K26	

== Championships and accomplishments ==
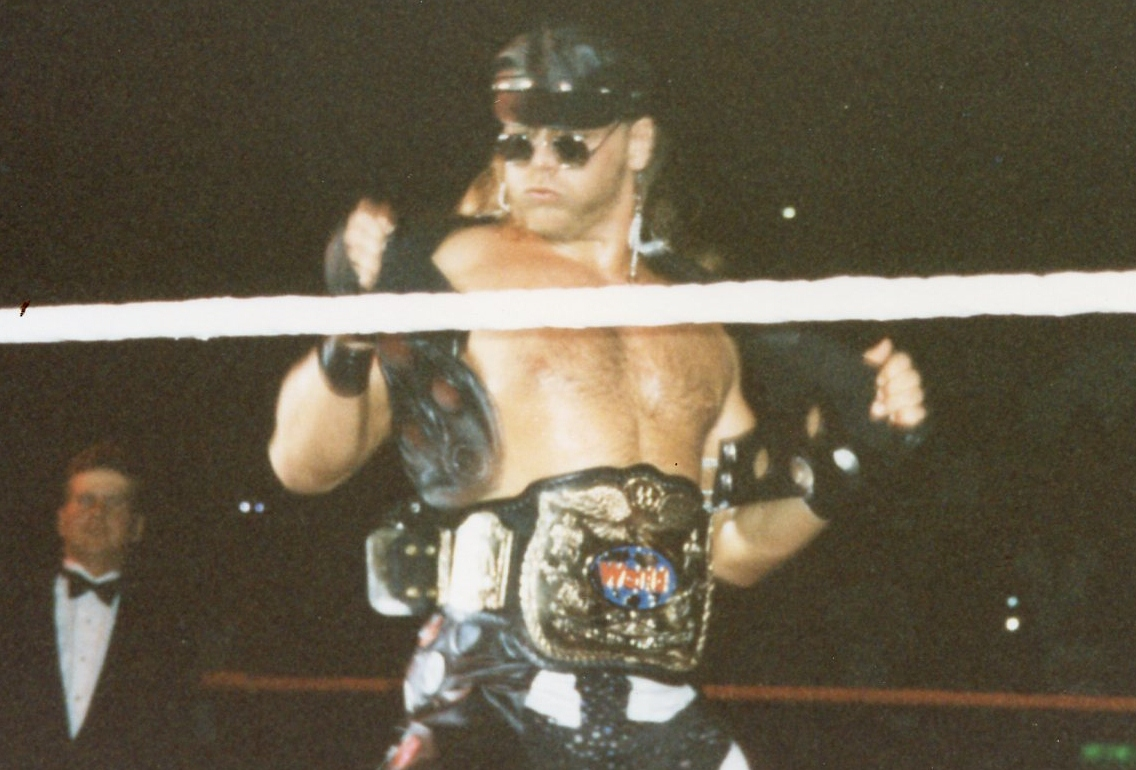
Michaels as WWF Tag Team Champion during his reign with Diesel

- American Wrestling Association
  - AWA World Tag Team Championship (2 times) – with Marty Jannetty
- The Baltimore Sun
  - Feud of the Year (2008) vs. Chris Jericho
  - Match of the Year (2007) vs. John Cena on Raw
  - Match of the Year (2008) vs. Ric Flair at WrestleMania XXIV
  - Match of the Year (2009) vs. The Undertaker at WrestleMania 25
  - Match of the Year (2010) vs. The Undertaker in a career vs. streak match at WrestleMania XXVI
  - Wrestler of the Year (2008)
- Cauliflower Alley Club
  - Art Abrams Lifetime Achievement/Lou Thesz Award (2018)
- CBS Sports
  - Worst Angle of the Year (2018) with Triple H vs. The Undertaker and Kane
- Central States Wrestling
  - NWA Central States Tag Team Championship (1 time) – with Marty Jannetty
- Continental Wrestling Association
  - AWA Southern Tag Team Championship (2 times) – with Marty Jannetty
- Pro Wrestling Illustrated
  - Feud of the Decade (2000–2009) vs. Chris Jericho
  - Feud of the Year (2008) vs. Chris Jericho
  - Match of the Decade (2000–2009) vs. Ric Flair at WrestleMania XXIV
  - Match of the Decade (2010–2019) vs. The Undertaker at WrestleMania XXVI
  - Match of the Year (1993) vs. Marty Jannetty on Monday Night Raw on May 17
  - Match of the Year (1994) vs. Razor Ramon in a ladder match at WrestleMania X
  - Match of the Year (1995) vs. Diesel at WrestleMania XI
  - Match of the Year (1996) vs. Bret Hart in an Iron Man match at WrestleMania XII
  - Match of the Year (2004) vs. Chris Benoit and Triple H at WrestleMania XX
  - Match of the Year (2005) vs. Kurt Angle at WrestleMania 21
  - Match of the Year (2006) vs. Vince McMahon in a No Holds Barred match at WrestleMania 22
  - Match of the Year (2007) vs. John Cena on Raw on April 23
  - Match of the Year (2008) vs. Ric Flair at WrestleMania XXIV
  - Match of the Year (2009) vs. The Undertaker at WrestleMania 25
  - Match of the Year (2010) vs. The Undertaker in a career vs. streak match at WrestleMania XXVI
  - Most Inspirational Wrestler of the Decade (2000–2009)
  - Most Inspirational Wrestler of the Year (2010)
  - Most Popular Wrestler of the Year (1995, 1996)
  - Stanley Wetson Award (2025)
  - Ranked No. 1 of the top 500 singles wrestlers in the PWI 500 in 1996
  - Ranked No. 10 of the top 500 singles wrestlers of the PWI Years in 2003
  - Ranked No. 33 and No. 55 of the top 100 tag teams of the PWI Years with Marty Jannetty and Diesel, respectively, in 2003
- Professional Wrestling Hall of Fame
  - Class of 2017
- Sports Illustrated
  - Ranked No. 8 of the 20 Greatest WWE Wrestlers Of All Time
- Texas All-Star Wrestling
  - TASW Texas Tag Team Championship (2 times) – with Paul Diamond
  - TASW Six-Man Tag Team Championship (1 time) – with Paul Diamond & DJ Peterson
- Texas Wrestling Alliance
  - TWA Heavyweight Championship (1 time)
- World Wrestling Federation / Entertainment / WWE
  - WWF Championship (3 times)
  - World Heavyweight Championship (1 time)
  - WWF Intercontinental Championship (3 times)
  - WWF European Championship (1 time)
  - WWE Tag Team Championship (1 time) – with Triple H
  - WWF/World Tag Team Championship (5 times) – with Diesel (2), Stone Cold Steve Austin (1), John Cena (1), Triple H (1)
  - Royal Rumble (1995, 1996)
  - First Grand Slam Champion
  - Fourth Triple Crown Champion
  - Slammy Award (15 times)
    - Best Finisher (1997)
    - Best Slammin' Jammin' Entrance (1996)
    - Best Tag Team (1994) – with Diesel
    - Best Threads (1996)
    - Double-Cross of the Year (2013) – For turning on Daniel Bryan and costing him the WWE Championship at Hell in a Cell.
    - Leader of the New Generation (1996)
    - Master of Mat Mechanics (1996)
    - Match of the Year (1994, 1996, 1997, 2008, 2009) – vs. Razor Ramon in a ladder match at WrestleMania X; vs. Razor Ramon in a ladder match at SummerSlam; vs Bret Hart at WrestleMania XII; vs The Undertaker at Badd Blood: In Your House; vs Ric Flair at WrestleMania XXIV; vs The Undertaker at WrestleMania 25
    - Moment of the Year (2010) – vs. The Undertaker at WrestleMania XXVI
    - Squared Circle Shocker (1996) – Won for collapsing; Owen Hart accepts the award for making Michaels collapse
    - Worst Tag Team (1994) – with Diesel
  - WWE Hall of Fame (2 times)
    - Class of 2011 – individually
    - Class of 2019 – as a member of D-Generation X
- Wrestling Observer Newsletter
  - Best Babyface (1996)
  - Feud of the Year (2004) vs. Chris Benoit and Triple H
  - Feud of the Year (2008) vs. Chris Jericho
  - Match of the Year (1994) vs. Razor Ramon in a ladder match at WrestleMania X
  - Match of the Year (2008) vs. Chris Jericho in a ladder match at No Mercy
  - Match of the Year (2009) vs. The Undertaker at WrestleMania 25
  - Match of the Year (2010) vs. The Undertaker at WrestleMania XXVI
  - Worst Match of the Year (2018) with Triple H vs. The Undertaker and Kane at Crown Jewel
  - Best Pro Wrestling DVD (2011) Greatest Rivalries: Shawn Michaels vs. Bret Hart
  - Most Charismatic (1995, 1996)
  - Tag Team of the Year (1989) with Marty Jannetty as The Rockers
  - Worst Feud of the Year (2006) with Triple H vs. Shane and Vince McMahon
  - Wrestling Observer Newsletter Hall of Fame (Class of 2003)

== Sources ==
- Assael, Shaun; Mooneyham, Mike (2002). Sex, Lies, and Headlocks: The Real Story of Vince McMahon and World Wrestling Entertainment. Crown. ISBN 1-4000-5143-6.
- Michaels, Shawn; Feigenbaum, Aaron (2005). Heartbreak & Triumph: The Shawn Michaels Story. New York, New York: WWE Books (Pocket Books). ISBN 978-0-7434-9380-2.
