= Texas All-Star USA Tag Team Championship =

Professional wrestling tag team championship

Details
- Promotion: Southwest Championship Wrestling; Texas All-Star Wrestling
- Date established: September 6, 1978
- Date retired: November 1986

Other names
- SCW Southwest Tag Team Championship (1978–1985); Texas All-Star USA Tag Team Championship (1985–1986)
Statistics
- First champions: Coloso Colosetti and Killer Tim Brooks
- Final champions: Mike Golden and Dizzy Golden
- Most reigns: The Dynamic Duo (Tully Blanchard and Gino Hernandez) (4 reigns)

The Texas All-Star USA Tag Team Championship was a major tag team title in Texas All-Star Wrestling. The title was first established in Southwest Championship Wrestling in 1978 when it was the SCW Southwest Tag Team Championship. The title's name was changed to the Texas All-Star Texas Tag Team Championship in May 1985 after SCW was sold to Texas All-Star Wrestling in April, and changed again to the Texas All-Star USA Tag Team Championship in 1986 before the title was abandoned in November that year when Texas All-Star was purchased by the World Class Wrestling Association.

== Title history ==
Wrestler	Time	Date	Location	Notes
SCW Southwest Tag Team Championship
Coloso Colosetti and Killer Tim Brooks	1	September 6, 1978	San Antonio, TX	Defeat Kevin Von Erich and David Von Erich.
[...]
The Dynamic Duo (Tully Blanchard and Gino Hernandez)	1	1981		Title awarded
Wahoo McDaniel and Terry Funk	1	August 15, 1981	San Antonio, TX	
The Dynamic Duo (Tully Blanchard and Gino Hernandez)	2	1981	?	
Bruiser Brody and Dick Slater	1	February 26, 1982	Houston, TX	
Ricky Morton and Ken Lucas	1	?	?	
The Dynamic Duo (Tully Blanchard and Gino Hernandez)	3	April 1982	?	
Ricky Morton and Ken Lucas	2	June 11, 1982	?	
The Dynamic Duo (Tully Blanchard and Gino Hernandez)	4	August 24, 1982	?	
Dick Slater (2) and Bob Sweetan	1	October 1982	Odessa, TX	Defeat Blanchard and a substitute when Hernandez no-shows but are stripped for pinning the substitute to win the belts.
Ricky Morton and Ken Lucas	3	December 1982	Corpus Christi, TX	Defeat The Grapplers in tournament final.
The Grapplers (Len Denton and Tony Anthony)	1	January 16, 1983	San Antonio, TX	
The Dynamic Duo (Tully Blanchard and Gino Hernandez)	5	March 21, 1983	San Antonio, TX	Aired on tape delay on March 27.
Vacant		March 21, 1983		Vacant on the same day when Blanchard attacks Hernandez with title belt immediately after victory.
The Grapplers (Len Denton and Tony Anthony)	2	April 2, 1983	San Antonio, TX	
The Sheepherders (Luke Williams and Jonathan Boyd)	1	May 7, 1983	San Antonio, TX	
Luke Williams and Bobby Jaggers	1	June 1983		Boyd breaks his leg in an auto accident.
Vacant		July 4, 1983		Williams attacks Jaggers after losing a non-title match to Bob Sweetan and Sweet Brown Sugar in San Antonio, TX.
Bobby Jaggers (2) and Buddy Moreno	1	August 29, 1983	San Antonio, TX	Defeat Bob Sweetan and Ken Timbs in 4-team tournament final.
The Fabulous Blonds (Eric Embry and Ken Timbs)	1	September 26, 1983	San Antonio, TX	Defeat Moreno and Scott Casey after Luke Williams reportedly breaks Jaggers' arm on September 19, 1983
Held up		November 24, 1983	San Antonio, TX	Title held up after a match against The Rock 'n' Roll Express.
The Fabulous Blonds (Eric Embry and Ken Timbs)	2	December 3, 1983	San Antonio, TX	Defeat The Rock 'n' Roll Express in rematch.
Al Perez and Manny Fernandez	1	April 9, 1984	San Antonio, TX	
The Fabulous Blonds (Eric Embry and Ken Timbs)	3	June 13, 1984		Awarded when Perez and Fernandez do not defend title
The Fabulous Blonds (Eric Embry (4) and Dan Greer)	1	July 21, 1984		Timbs leaves SWCW and is replaced by Greer sometime before July 21, 1984.
Brett Sawyer and Chicky Starr	1	September 9, 1984	San Antonio, TX	
The Fabulous Blonds (Eric Embry (5) and Dan Greer (2))	2	October 18, 1984	San Antonio, TX	
Jerry Oske and Rick Casey	1	December 17, 1984	San Antonio, TX	
The Maoris (Tudui and Wakahi)	1	January 20, 1985	San Antonio, TX	SWCW is sold to Texas All-Star during The Maoris' reign in May 1985.
Renamed Texas All-Star Texas Tag Team Championship
American Force (Paul Diamond and Frank Lang)	1	May 1985		
New Zealand Maoris	2	May 12, 1985	San Antonio, TX	
American Breed (Paul Diamond (2) and Nick Kiniski)	1	May 25, 1985	San Antonio, TX	
Al Madril and Chavo Guerrero	1	July 5, 1985	San Antonio, TX	
Vacant		August 1985		Madril and Guerrero split after Guerrero pulls out of a scheduled defence against American Force with Gory Guerrero as a selected guest referee; Madril and substitute Black Gordman lose the match and attack Gory.
Chavo Guerrero	1	September 1, 1985	San Antonio, TX	Chavo defeats Madril to take possession of both belts but chooses to give them away instead of picking a new partner
American Force (Paul Diamond (3) and Shawn Michaels)	1	September 1, 1985	San Antonio, TX	Given belts by Chavo Guerrero.
The Masked Hoods (Ricky Santana and Tony Torres)	1	September 29, 1985	San Antonio, TX	
American Force (Paul Diamond (4) and Shawn Michaels (2))	2	November 17, 1985	San Antonio, TX	
Al Madril (2) and Magnificent Zulu	1	January 27, 1986	?	
Al Madril (3) and Mike Golden	1	April 1986		Zulu is fired.
Renamed Texas All-Star U.S.A. Tag Team Championship
The Dream Team (King Parsons and Tiger Conway Jr.)	1	May 23, 1986	Pasadena, TX	
Mike Golden (2) and Dizzy Golden	1	August 10, 1986	Pasadena, TX	
The Dream Team (King Parsons and Tiger Conway Jr.)	2	September 30, 1986	Houston, TX	
Mike Golden and Dizzy Golden	2	October 1986		Awarded after Parsons leaves promotion.
Title retired		November 1986		Texas All-Star is sold to World Class Wrestling Association
