= Nick Kiniski =

Canadian retired professional wrestler (born 1961)

Personal information
- Born: Nicholas Kiniski; August 25, 1961 (age 64) Calgary, Alberta, Canada

Professional wrestling career
- Ring name: Nick Kiniski
- Trained by: Gene Kiniski
- Debut: January 22, 1985
- Retired: 1990

Nicholas Kiniski (born August 25, 1961) is a Canadian retired professional wrestler. He is best known for his work with WCCW, PNW and AWA and for being one half of the tag team American Force with Paul Diamond in Texas All-Star Wrestling. He and his brother, wrestler Kelly Kiniski, are the sons of former NWA World Heavyweight Champion Gene Kiniski.

== Career ==
Nick Kiniski started wrestling in 1980. He was trained by his father, the legendary "Canada's Greatest Athlete" Gene Kiniski. He wrestled four years on the Canadian National Team and he was an alternate on the 1984 Canadian Olympic Team. His pro debut took place in the Oklahoma area on January 22, 1985, when he lost to Buck Zumhofe by disqualification when Nick's brother, Kelly Kiniski, interfered.

=== Texas-All Star Wrestling (1985–1986) ===
He first rose to fame in Fred Barend's Texas All-Star Wrestling. He formed a tag team with Paul Diamond called American Breed. Neither Diamond nor Kiniski were actually American; Diamond was Croatian/Canadian and Kiniski was Canadian, so the team name is quite ironic. The team won the TASW Tag Team Championship from the Maoris (Tudui & Wakahi) on May 25, 1985 and held them until Al Madril and Chavo Guerrero took the titles from them on June 5, 1985. The TASW Tag Team title was vacated later that same month when Chavo Guerrero refused to wrestle in a rematch against Diamond and Kiniski because Chavo’s father Gory Guerrero was the special referee chosen for the match. Madril teamed up with Black Gorman instead but lost the match. After the match Madril attacked Chavo Guerrero, splitting the team and forcing the titles to be held up. When Chavo later won the rights to name a new championship partner after defeating Madril in a singles match, he chose to give the titles to the American Breed instead, only now the American Breed consisted of Paul Diamond and a rookie named Shawn Michaels. After the formation of the Diamond/Michaels version of American Force, Kiniski left the company in 1986.

=== Pacific Northwest Wrestling (1986) ===
Kiniski joined Portland, Oregon-based Don Owen's Pacific Northwest Wrestling in 1986. He debuted at the PNW Superstars Extravaganza supershow, where he defeated Timothy Flowers by disqualification. He started feuding with Rip Oliver for the NWA Pacific Northwest Heavyweight Championship but the feud was unsuccessful for Kiniski. He also had a short-lived feud with Danny Collins before leaving PNW.

=== World Wrestling Federation (1986) ===
Kiniski wrestled a few times for the WWF at their frequent Madison Square Garden shows as well as at the Boston Garden, including wins over Steve Lombardi (aka Brooklyn Brawler), Frenchy Martin, Jimmy Jack Funk and Les Thornton in late 1986/early1987. He was featured on WWF's television shows at least once - including a very competitive match against current WWF Intercontinental Champion Randy Savage which he only narrowly lost, on the December 27th 1986 edition of WWF Superstars of Wrestling.

In 2024, Kiniski accused former WWF producer Terry Garvin of having propositioned him for sex in the 1980s, and that his refusal led to Kiniski's termination from the company.

=== American Wrestling Association (1986–1987) ===
Kiniski joined American Wrestling Association in late 1986. He formed a heel tag team with Kevin Kelly called The Perfect Tag Team to contend for the AWA World Tag Team Championship. He and Kelly had actually started wrestling together in the WWF. The duo was managed by Sherri Martel. Martel left the AWA in July 1987 and was replaced by Madusa Miceli as the team's manager. They eventually pursued singles careers as Kiniski left the team.

=== World Class Championship Wrestling (1987–1990) ===
The last promotion where Kiniski wrestled was World Class Championship Wrestling. He started his WCCW stint in 1987 and feuded with the Von Erichs. He used to wrestle Kevin and Kerry for most of his matches but he had few victories over Kevin and Kerry. He retired from professional wrestling when the promotion closed in 1990 and merged with United States Wrestling Association.

== Personal life ==
After retiring, Kiniski moved to the small town of Point Roberts located within an American exclave along the Canada-America border. He opened a bar, named Kiniski's reef, and later became a commissioner in the towns fire department.

== Championships and accomplishments ==
- Texas All-Star Wrestling
  - TASW Tag Team Championship (1 time) – with Paul Diamond
