= Music City Wrestling =

American professional wrestling promotion

- Acronym: MCW, NWA Worldwide, OMW, NAASW
- Founded: 1994
- Defunct: 2000
- Style: Rasslin'
- Headquarters: Nashville, Tennessee
- Founder: Bert Prentice
- Owner(s): Bert Prentice; Bill Behrens (1997–1998)
- Formerly: Ozark Mountain Wrestling (1994-1995); North American All-Star Wrestling (1995-1997); Music City Wrestling (1997-1999); National Wrestling Alliance Worldwide (1999-2000)
- Successor: NWA Nashville; NWA Wildside
- Website: MCWWrestling.com

Music City Wrestling, formerly Ozark Mountain Wrestling and North American All-Star Wrestling, and also referred to as NWA Worldwide, was a professional wrestling promotion headquartered in Nashville, Tennessee. The promotion was also a territory for the National Wrestling Alliance from 1997 to 2000.

== History ==
=== Ozark Mountain Wrestling (1994-1995) ===
Prentice formed the promotion in late 1994 upon leaving the United States Wrestling Association, where he was then managing Spellbinder and The Eliminators. There was speculation he would run opposition to the USWA and started promoting events in neighboring Arkansas. The first Ozark Mountain Heavyweight Champion, Kit Carson, won the championship that fall. The Colorado Kid beat Carson for the title in Jonesboro, Arkansas on November 12, 1994. He and The Spiders (Spider #1 and Spider #2) were promoted as OMW's top stars during this early period. The first TV tapings were held in Jonesboro and aired on February 18, 1995, with subsequent shows airing on Saturday mornings. OMW scheduled 17 live events that month, the most of any promotion in the United States with the exception of the World Wrestling Federation.

Prentice was soon able to attract a number of wrestlers to his outlaw group including, most notably, Ricky Morton, Tracey Smothers and Buddy Landel. In April, Tommy Rich officially announced he was jumping from the USWA to OMW. Candi Devine became the Ozark Mountain Women's Champion that spring and The Moondogs (Moondog Spot and Moondog Rex) won the Ozark Mountain Tag Team Championship soon after.

I know the opening of this small Ozark Mountain office doesn't get you too excited, but it's in my own backyard and I've found it to be fun. I think you don't see the real importance of them getting television and running regular towns. This is the first time since the old Poffo ICW promotion that a promotion has tried to run in direct competition with Jarrett in this area. They have television and are running five regular towns. There have been people that have gotten on Memphis cable access but they've never tried to run a regular set of towns. If Bert Prentice succeeds in getting this show over, the local channel may give him a one hour block. Ch. 8 in Jonesboro, AR isn't seen on the Memphis cable but is in all the Arkansas and Missouri towns that USWA runs. If more of the USWA talent sees that Bert can give them as much work and pay them more, then they'll jump ship. This could turn into a major battle for talent. It would be good for the wrestlers in this area, but might not be good for the USWA. This might not be a big WWF/WCW story, but it deserves more mention than two lines in the Observer.

— Brian Tramel, "The Readers Pages: Ozark Mountain Wrestling", Wrestling Observer, March 1995.

On March 20, Cactus Jack defeated OMW North American Champion The Colorado Kid in Jonesboro to win the title. Cactus Jack and his then manager, Freddie Fargo, double-teamed The Colorado Kid prior to winning the title and seriously injured the young wrestler's chest after beating him with the OMW championship belt. The violent title match ended when fellow "fan favorite" Man Mountain Mike attempted to help the Colorado Kid, but Cactus Jack and Fargo slammed Mike into the Kid's leg, allowing Jack to score the pinfall victory. A rematch was quickly signed as a Steel Cage match to prevent Fargo from interfering. He remained champion for three weeks before dropping the belt back to The Colorado Kid the following month.

On April 24, Dick Murdoch made a special appearance teaming with Smothers, and representing the Southern United States, defeated The Spiders. Local wrestlers Rick Burton and Steve Stratton were under the masks as the original team, now known as The Headbangers, were recruited by Smoky Mountain Wrestling. Tommy Rich also left for SMW after defeating David Haskins in a Loser Leaves Town match in Jonesboro on June 19. Weeks later, the original Spiders made their last OMW appearance joining The Colorado Kid to defeat Giant Warrior, Bull Pain and Motley Cruz. The Wrestling Observer speculated low payouts were the reason for these departures as was OMW's inability to attract major stars.

Despite this, OMW's weekly tv show was expanded to one hour in the in Jonesboro and Little Rock areas. The show was also in negotiations with WATL out of Atlanta, Georgia to be part of a 5-hour pro wrestling block that would include Extreme Championship Wrestling, the North Georgia Wrestling Alliance, Smoky Mountain Wrestling and United States Wrestling Association. Prentice also announced plans for a major supercard celebrating OMW's first anniversary. Missy Hyatt was brought in to manage The Iron Sheik in the main event against The Colorado Kid. The show was originally scheduled for July 31 but it was postponed to August 5. Many of the wrestlers advertised failed to appear on the night of the show including the headline attraction The Iron Sheik. USWA regulars Rex King, Steve Doll, Pat Tanaka, Jerry Faith and Miss Texas were prevented from participating due to the ongoing OMW-USWA promotional war. The sole exception was Buddy Wayne, who was then driving USWA's ring truck. Prentice was forced to make last-minutes changes to the lineup as a result. Missy Hyatt instead managed several of the "heel" performers, Dutch Mantel and Rip Rogers were brought in, and The Colorado Kid defeated Bull Pain in a Steel Cage match. The event included special guest appearances from Superstars of Wrestling hosts Joe Pedecino and Boni Blackstone, as well as the original Treach Phillips. Phillips, then 65-years-old and in a wheelchair, made his last in-ring appearance at the show. OMW earned $6,500 in ticket sales from an attendance of 800.

That fall, Prentice was able to weather another setback when OMW Tag Team Champions, The Moondogs, left the promotion. He successfully negotiated the return of The Spiders, who agreed to spilt their time between OMW and SMW, and managed to lure away Bill Dundee among other USWA talent. A longtime booker for the Memphis territory, Dundee was quickly given control of the day-to-day operations. The close of Smoky Mountain Wrestling in November 1995 saw its former roster being enlisted in the war between OMW and the USWA. Extreme Championship Wrestling wrestler Chad Austin also joined the promotion.

OMW soon won control of Evansville, Indiana, a longtime USWA stronghold, holding its first show at the Evansville Arena on November 8, 1995, and its programming aired Friday nights on Channel 14.

=== North American All-Star Wrestling (1995-1996) ===
In December 1995, Prentice decided to relocate Ozark Mountain from Arkansas to Indiana with the promotion being renamed North American All-Star Wrestling. The first shows under the NAASW banner were held West Memphis, Arkansas on November 28 and Evansville on November 29, 1995. Tommy Rich was brought back to the promotion while more USWA talent defected to Prentice: Steve Doll, Spellbinder, Tasha Simone and Pat Tanaka. Rich made his official return on December 13, 1995, teaming with Bill Dundee to defeat Rip Rogers and Bonecrusher Lewis via disqualification.

During the last week of 1995, Prentice enjoyed the best week in company's history. The promotion earned $10,952 with five live events held in four different states: two in Jonesboro and one each in Evansville, Madisonville, Kentucky, and Kennett, Missouri. Over the next few months, NAASW featured The Honky Tonk Man, Dutch Mantel, Tracy Smothers, Ricky Morton, Butch Reed and Sapphire. The war with the USWA continued with a preliminary wrestler, "Stin ky Hale", appearing at a December 28th NAASW show in Madisonville, which was alleged to be a reference to then USWA booker Randy Hales. However, Prentice and Hales came to an understanding soon afterwards. USWA wrestlers were allowed to compete in both promotions and they agreed to advertise each others live events in their respective tv shows. Bill Dundee made his USWA return giving a "worked shoot" on Memphis tv beginning a "NAASW vs. USWA" angle.

== Territorial reach ==
Prentice initially ran events in northeastern Arkansas, promoting weekly shows in Jonesboro, Blytheville, Wynne and Paragould, and regular shows at the ASU Armory. This was an area traditionally part of the Memphis wrestling territory and was then controlled by the United States Wrestling Association. This put Prentice in direct competition with USWA promoters Jerry Jarrett and Jerry "The King" Lawler as Prentice expanded his operations resulting in a three-year promotional war.

Starting in 1995, the promotion began airing a weekly television series. Within two years, "Music City Wrestling" was being broadcast on over 140 stations throughout the U.S. and was also available via internet television. At the time, it was one of the few independent promotions to have nationally syndicated programming.

With the USWA's close in November 1997, MCW moved into what was once part of the Nashville wrestling territory while Power Pro Wrestling took control of the Memphis end of the territory. It also revived the Saturday night shows held by the USWA at Nashville's Tennessee State Fairgrounds Sports Arena.

At its height, Music City's core territory included northeastern Arkansas, southern Indiana and central Tennessee, and promoted as far as southern Illinois and southeast Missouri, and at least one show at the Northwest Georgia Trade and Convention Center in Dalton, Georgia.

== Notable talent ==
The promotion featured a number of wrestlers who were mainstays on the Southeastern independent circuit and as well as former stars from the United States Wrestling Association. These included The Colorado Kid, Chris Champion, Doug Gilbert, Flash Flanagan, Thrillbilly, Steven Dunn, Jesse James Armstrong, Reno Riggins, Billy Joe Travis, Frenchy Riviera, The Centerfolds (Kenny Arden & John Arden) and PG-13 (J. C. Ice and Wolfie D). The Colorado Kid, a one-time former USWA World Heavyweight Champion, was initially featured as the company's top star. PG-13, who held the USWA World Tag Team Championship multiples times, split up in MCW with Wolfie D forming the "MCW Blacksheep" with Flanagan.

Music City Wrestling also showcased younger wrestlers many of whom would later be picked up by national wrestling promotions, including Air Paris, Adam Pierce, Andy Anderson, Giant Warrior, Lita, Justin St. John, Nick Dinsmore Shane Helms, Shannon Moore, and the Bad Street Boys (Christian York and Joey Matthews).

MCW was one of two Tennessee area promotions, along with Memphis-based Power Pro Wrestling, actively scouted by the World Wrestling Federation for up and coming talent. The WWF also used both promotions as a training ground for its developmental wrestlers and allowed the WWF roster to perform on major shows. Among these included Brakkus, Mabel, Al Snow and Jerry "The King" Lawler. MCW wrestlers occasionally appeared on WWF television, typically in dark matches or cameo roles, when holding shows in the Nashville area.

Christine Jarrett and Sara Lee, both key figures in the old Memphis wrestling territory, were quickly hired by Prentice after they were fired by the USWA. Prentice credited Jarrett for being able to access to the Nashville Fairgrounds. They both held a number of roles both behind the scenes and Sara Lee, an ex-wrestler for NWA Mid-America, made her last in-ring appearance in a match against Burt Prentice.

== Style and controversy ==
Music City Wrestling was very old school - you weren't allowed to have any communication with your opponent before your match. The wrestlers would just talk things through in the ring. It was great experience for me. I learned how to get in there and think on my feet. I learned that you don't freak out if things don't necessarily go as planned in the ring, you just keep going.

— Amy Dumas, Lita: A Less Traveled R.O.A.D. – The Reality of Amy Dumas (2003)

Well Dunn (Timothy Well and Steven Dunn) briefly reunited in MCW where Dunn turned on his longtime partner to form a new team with Reno Riggins. The Tennessee Volunteers went on to win the NWA North American Tag Team Championship several times in 1998 and 1998.

== National Wrestling Alliance ==
In 1997, Music City Wrestling joined the National Wrestling Alliance. MCW's co-promoter Bill Behrens was an outspoken advocate for the NWA building major stars with national recognition. As part of this effort, Behrens announced his plans to change MCW's weekly television show, which he claimed reached a potential audience of 40 million people via syndication, to an NWA-branded wrestling show.

A poll conducted by PWI in December 1997 showed 48% of wrestling fans believed Music City could replace the USWA as a strong regional promotion.

The next year, MCW-NWA tv tapings moved from the Nashville Fairgrounds to the EXPO Center in Smyrna, Tennessee. On April 13, 1998, Bert Prentice announced he had sold his 75% ownership of MCW to Bill Behrens and a group of investors. Prentice agreed to remain with the promotion for another few months as an advisor.

On June 6, 1998, Jackie Fargo, Ole Anderson, Harley Race, Corsica Joe, and Jerry Jarrett were honored at Music City show at the Nashville Fairgrounds. Fargo later served as the cornerman for The Colorado Kid in match against Wolfie D in the main event, and both wrestlers did the famous "Fargo Strut" after his victory.

By July 1998, the promotion was running 20 live events a month. In addition to the Nashville Fairgrounds, weekly shows were also held at the Music City Mix factory and the Lebanon National Guard Armory.

During the summer, Pro Wrestling Illustrated named Music City Wrestling one of the top independent promotions in the United States. That fall, the promotion achieved national exposure with its weekly television show.

On September 1, 1998, Prentice officially transferred full ownership of MCW to Behrens. One of Behrens' first acts was to cancel all of MCW's tv tapings at the Smyrna Expo Center, due to the ongoing road construction on I-24, as well as the next three TV tapings scheduled at the Music City Mix Factory. "Best of MCW" episodes were aired on TV during the next two weeks. At the time, Behrens was also promoting NWA Georgia out of Atlanta, Georgia.

Music City Wrestling received wide and favorable coverage from a number of pro wrestling magazines during the mid-to-late 1990s. Its roster was regularly included in the annual PWI 500 during this time. Pro Wrestling Illustrated named Music City one of the top ranking promotions in the Southern United States from October 1997 to April 1999.

On February 5, 1999, MCW held the "Fabulous February Reunion" supercard at the Nashville Fairgrounds. NWA North American Champion The Colorado Kid and Jerry "The King" Lawler, accompanied by his valet Stacy, headlined the event. The match ended in a disqualification after Stacy hit The Colorado Kid over the head with one of her high heel shoes. On the undercard, North American Tag Team Champions The Tennessee Volunteerz (Reno Riggins and Steven Dunn) battled The Aussies (Bill Dundee and Ashley Hudson) in a "Fans Bring the Weapons" match. According to Larry Goodman of the Whoo! Wrestling Newsletter, axe handles, a skateboard, cookie sheets, jumper cables and a frying pan were among the foreign objects used. There were no steel guard rails for the event allowing fans to hand weapons directly to the wrestlers. One person handed Dundee a battery charger and, after asking the fan what the item was, promptly used it on his opponent. Both teams eventually fought to a no-contest causing the tag titles to be held-up. Another featured match saw Barnyard Briggs toss Bart Sawyer out of the ring and into a pile of cow manure to win. Also at the event, Sara Lee, Jimmy Smith and "Billy the Program Seller" were inducted into the Nashville Wrestling Hall of Fame. Jim White, who was part of the 1998 class, appeared to accept his award.

On May 15, 1999, Music City Wrestling was one of thirteen promotions to participate at the Break the Barrier supercard held at the ECW Arena. MCW was represented by The Tennessee Volunteerz (Reno Riggins and Steven Dunn) versus The Badstreet Boyz (Christian York and Joey Matthews).

That summer, Shannon Moore and Shane Helms began training at the WCW Power Plant. In February 2000, after close negotiations with the WWF fell through, Prentice signed a deal with World Championship Wrestling to develop wrestling talent based in the Southern United States.

In 1999, Music City Wrestling left the Nashville Fairgrounds for the Municipal Auditorium. Its debut was scheduled for early October, with MCW and NWA shows being held once or twice a month, and TV tapings with free admission at Coleman Teleproductions.

== Championships and programming ==
=== Championships ===
Music City Wrestling / NWA Worldwide promoted championships

Championship	Final champion(s)	Notes
MCW North American Heavyweight Championship	James Storm	The heavyweight title of Music City Wrestling. The title was established in 1994 under Ozark Mountain Wrestling and continued to be defended until 1998. It was replaced by the NWA North American Championship after The Colorado Kid defeated Recon to win the then vacant title. The title was briefly revived in 2000 and defended through the year. James Storm was the final champion.
MCW / NWA Worldwide Television Championship	Lonnie Lane	The title was established in 1999 under National Wrestling Alliance affiliate and MCW successor, NWA Worldwide, and continued to be defended until 2001. The first champion was Prodigy T.J. Gray and the final champion was Lonnie Lane. The title was replaced by the NWA Nashville Television Championship in April 2001.
MCW Southern Heavyweight Championship	Terry Golden	A secondary title of Music City Wrestling. It was established in 1997 and was defended through the year. Terry Golden was the only champion.
MCW Southern Tennessee State Heavyweight Championship	Hot Rod Briggs	A secondary title of Music City Wrestling. It was established in 1998 and was defended through the year. Hot Rod Briggs was the first and final champion.
OMW Women's Championship	Candi Devine	The women's title of Ozark Mountain Wrestling. It was established in 1995 and was defended through the year. Candi Devine was the only champion.
MCW Midgets Championship	Lone Eagle	The midget title of Music City Wrestling. It was established in 1997 and was defended through the year. Lone Eagle was the only champion.
MCW North American Tag Team Championship	The MCW Blacksheep (Wolfie D and Flash Flanagan)	The tag team title of Music City Wrestling. The title was established in 1995 under Ozark Mountain Wrestling and continued to be defended until 1998. It was replaced by the NWA North American Tag Team Championship after The MCW Blacksheep (Wolfie D and Flash Flanagan) defeated The Tennessee Volunteerz (Steven Dunn and Reno Riggins) to win the then vacant title.

Championships recognized by Music City Wrestling

Championship	Champion	Notes
NWA World Heavyweight Championship		The heavyweight title of the National Wrestling Alliance.
NWA North American Heavyweight Championship		A secondary title of the National Wrestling Alliance.
NWA World Tag Team Championship		The tag team title of the National Wrestling Alliance.
NWA North American Tag Team Championship		A secondary tag team title of the National Wrestling Alliance.

=== Programming ===
Programming	Notes
OMW TV	(1995–1996) Syndicated
NAASW TV	(1996–1997) Syndicated
MCW TV	(1997–1998) Syndicated, also broadcast on the American Independent Network and America One Network
