= Moondog (disambiguation) =

Moondog was an American composer and musician, born as Louis T. Hardin.

Moondog or Moondogs may also refer to:

== Professional wrestling ==
- Moondog Rex (1950–2019), American professional wrestler
- Moondogs (professional wrestling), a professional wrestling stable
- Moondog Mayne, a common ring name of professional wrestler Ronald Doyle Mayne

== Arts and media ==
- Moondog, a comic by George Metzger
- Moondog, a character in the comic strip Monty
- Moondog (sculpture), created by Tony Smith
- Moon Dogs (short story collection), science fiction short stories by Michael Swanwick
- Moondog, the main character in the Harmony Korine movie The Beach Bum

=== Music ===
- Moondog, nickname of disc jockey Alan Freed
  - Moondog Coronation Ball, a 1952 event in Cleveland hosted by Freed, generally regarded as the first major Rock and Roll concert
- The Moondogs (band), a 1970s punk rock band from Northern Ireland
- Moondog (band), a late-1980s hardcore band featuring members of Gorilla Biscuits
- Moondog Jr., a Belgian musical band later known as Zita Swoon
- Moondog (1956 album), an album by Moondog
- Moondog (1969 album), an album by Moondog

== Other uses ==
- Moon dog, a bright spot on a lunar halo
- Moondog, mascot of the Cleveland Cavaliers NBA basketball team
- Mankato MoonDogs, an amateur baseball team in the U.S.
- Moondog Brewery, craft brewery based in Melbourne Australia that occasionally collaborates with Mountain Goat Beer

== See also ==
- Johnny and the Moondogs, an early name of The Beatles
- Moondoggie
