= Hoboken Saturday Night =

Studio album by the Insect Trust
- Released: 1970
- Genre: Rock; experimental
- Label: ATCO
- Producer: Steve Duboff

The Insect Trust chronology
The Insect Trust (1968)	Hoboken Saturday Night (1970)

Hoboken Saturday Night is the second and final album by the American band the Insect Trust, released in 1970. The band supported the album by playing the Memphis Country Blues Festival, which was first organized by band member Bill Barth in 1966.

Hoboken Saturday Night is regarded as a cult classic. It was reissued in 2004, owing to the advocacy of Robert Christgau, who also contributed new liner notes.

== Production ==
The album was produced by Steve Duboff. It is in part a tribute to Hoboken, New Jersey, where the bandmembers lived due to the inexpensive rents, blue-collar vibe, and proximity to Manhattan. Elvin Jones played drums on a couple of the tracks. "The Eyes of a New York Woman" is a rerecording of a 1968 single by the Primitives, an early incarnation of the band; the lyrics were taken without permission from Thomas Pynchon's V. Pynchon had sued the band, but allowed them to use the lyrics for the album release. "Be a Hobo" is a version of the Moondog composition. "Mr. Garfield" is a version of the song often credited to Ramblin' Jack Elliott. According to Robert Christgau, the "blues scholars" in the band listened to "a lot of Arabic and Eastern European music" in the lead-up to the album.

== Critical reception ==
Professional ratings
Review scores
Source	Rating
AllMusic	4/5 stars
Robert Christgau	A
Rolling Stone	4/5 stars
Times-News	4/5 stars

In The Village Voice, Robert Christgau wrote that "these passionate humanists ... sound friendly and have come up with a charming, joyous, irrepressibly experimental record"; in his obituary for band member Robert Palmer, he dubbed it a "great lost hippie album." The Courier Journal said that "the record is a romping, stomping wonder that breaks all the guitars-bass-and-drums shackles the Beatles put on contemporary music." A syndicated column in the Times-News opined that vocalist Nancy Jeffries "just might be the best pop singer in the country," and noted that the album is "full of dusty, cobwebbed corners of music that no one has poked into in years."

Rolling Stone stated that the Insect Trust "explored rock's fundamental cross-currents—holy-rolling and fieldhand blues, dirt-road country and the freewheeling joys of early and modern jazz—with invention and pop acumen." The Guinness Encyclopedia of Popular Music concluded that "overall the collection lacked the element of surprise which made the group's debut so spellbinding." AllMusic determined that they "touched upon facets of the singer/songwriter, psychedelic, and folk-rock subgenres, while somehow eluding them all."

== Track listing ==
No.	Title	Length
1.	"Be a Hobo"
2.	"Hoboken Saturday Night"
3.	"The Eyes of a New York Woman"
4.	"Ragtime Millionaire"
5.	"Somedays"
6.	"Our Sister the Sun"
7.	"Reciprocity"
8.	"Trip on Me"
9.	"Now Then Sweet Man / Mr. Garfield"
10.	"Reincarnations"
11.	"Glade Song"
12.	"Ducks"
