= Moondog 2 =

Studio album by Moondog
- Released: 1971
- Genre: Classical music, modernism
- Length: 42:12
- Label: CBS Records
- Producer: James William Guercio

Moondog chronology
Moondog (1969)	Moondog 2 (1971)	Moondog in Europe (1977)

Professional ratings
Review scores
Source	Rating
Allmusic	link

Moondog 2 is the sixth album by American composer Moondog AKA Louis Thomas Hardin.

This album was the followup to the 1969 album Moondog. Produced with James William Guercio, it featured Moondog's daughter June Hardin as a vocalist.

Unlike his previous instrumental album, which was largely performed by an orchestra, Moondog 2 contains vocal compositions in canons, rounds, and madrigals, and harked back to the home-recorded feel of his earliest records. In the liner notes to the album, Hardin states he first began writing rounds in the late winter or early spring of 1951 but soon moved on to instrumental music. But after he'd heard in 1968 that Big Brother and the Holding Company had recorded "All Is Loneliness" he took to writing them again.

The album has been re-released twice as a 2-for-1 CD combining Moondog and Moondog 2: once by CBS in 1989, and once by Beat Goes On Records in 2001.

== Reception ==
Big Brother and the Holding Company featuring Janis Joplin covered the song "All Is Loneliness" on their 1967 self-titled album. The song was also covered by Antony and the Johnsons during their 2005 tour. New York band The Insect Trust play a cover of Moondog's song "Be a Hobo" on their album Hoboken Saturday Night.

== Track listing ==
All tracks are written by Moondog (Louis Hardin)

Side one
No.	Title	Length
1.	"Bells Are Ringing"	1:19
2.	"Voices of Spring"	1:47
3.	"What's the Most Exciting Thing?"	2:31
4.	"All Is Loneliness"	1:16
5.	"My Tiny Butterfly"	1:12
6.	"Why Spend a Dark Night with Me?"	1:09
7.	"Coffee Beans"	2:10
8.	"Down Is Up"	1:07
9.	"Be a Hobo"	1:09
10.	"Remember"	1:52
11.	"I Love You"	1:08
12.	"Nero's Expedition"	1:52
13.	"No, the Wheel Was Never Invented"	1:20

Side two
No.	Title	Length
1.	"With My Wealth"	1:35
2.	"This Student of Life"	1:24
3.	"Some Trust All"	1:28
4.	"Wine, Woman and Song"	2:23
5.	"Sadness"	1:22
6.	"Maybe"	2:03
7.	"Each Today Is Yesterday's Tomorrow"	1:37
8.	"Imagine"	2:16
9.	"You the Vandal"	2:08
10.	"Trees Against the Sky"	1:18
11.	"Behold"	1:27
12.	"Sparrow"	1:37
13.	"Pastoral"	2:42

== Personnel ==
=== Musicians ===
- Louis Hardin, June Hardin – vocals, percussion
- James William Guercio – percussion
- Kay Jafee – virginal, recorder, piano, harpsichord, organ (Note: credited as "ancient organ")
- Michael Jafee – recorder, guitar
- Steven Silverstein – schom
- Judith Davidoff – viola de gamba
- Gillian Stevens – troubadour harp
- June Hardin, Mary Hardin, Specs Powell – percussion

=== Technical personnel ===
- James William Guercio – producer
  - Alfred V. Brown – associate producer
- Don Puluse – recording engineer
- Moondog – musical direction, liner notes
  - Gillian Stephens – transcription
- Ron Coro, Teresa Alfieri – album design
  - Beverly Scott – handwriting
- Columbia Records Photo Studio – photography
