= London Saxophonic =

Saxophone ensemble begun by Gareth Brady

London Saxophonic is a saxophone ensemble (with piano, bass guitar, and percussion) begun by Gareth Brady, Will Gregory and Simon Haram, while they were studying at the Guildhall School of Music and Drama. They made their debut in 1994 on Atlantic Records with Sax Pax for a Sax, a collaboration with Moondog, who composed all of the works on the album. In 1998, they went to the now-defunct label Tring (primarily a budget-label of technically primitive, cheaply recorded classical music) with a Michael Nyman retrospective titled An Eye for a Difference, produced by David Roach.

== Membership ==
- Tim Redpath - sopranino saxophone, soprano saxophone
- Simon Haram - sopranino saxophone, soprano saxophone, alto saxophone, electric wind instrument
- Rob Buckland - soprano saxophone, alto saxophone
- Christian Forshaw - sopranino saxophone, soprano saxophone, alto saxophone
- Andy Findon - bass saxophone, piccolo
- Elizabeth Burley - piano
- Martin Elliott - bass guitar
- Chris Caldwell - baritone saxophone
- Will Gregory - alto saxophone, baritone
- Gareth Brady - tenor saxophone
- Andy Scott - tenor saxophone
- David Roach - soprano saxophone, alto saxophone, tenor saxophone
- Bernd Kowalzik
- Bradley Grant
- Peter Hammill
- John Rebbeck
- Stuart Gordon
- Graham Cole
- Paul Clarvis
- Mike Brogan
- Andrew Davis
- Danny Thompson
- Alun Thomas
- Nicola Meecham
