= V. =

1963 novel by Thomas Pynchon

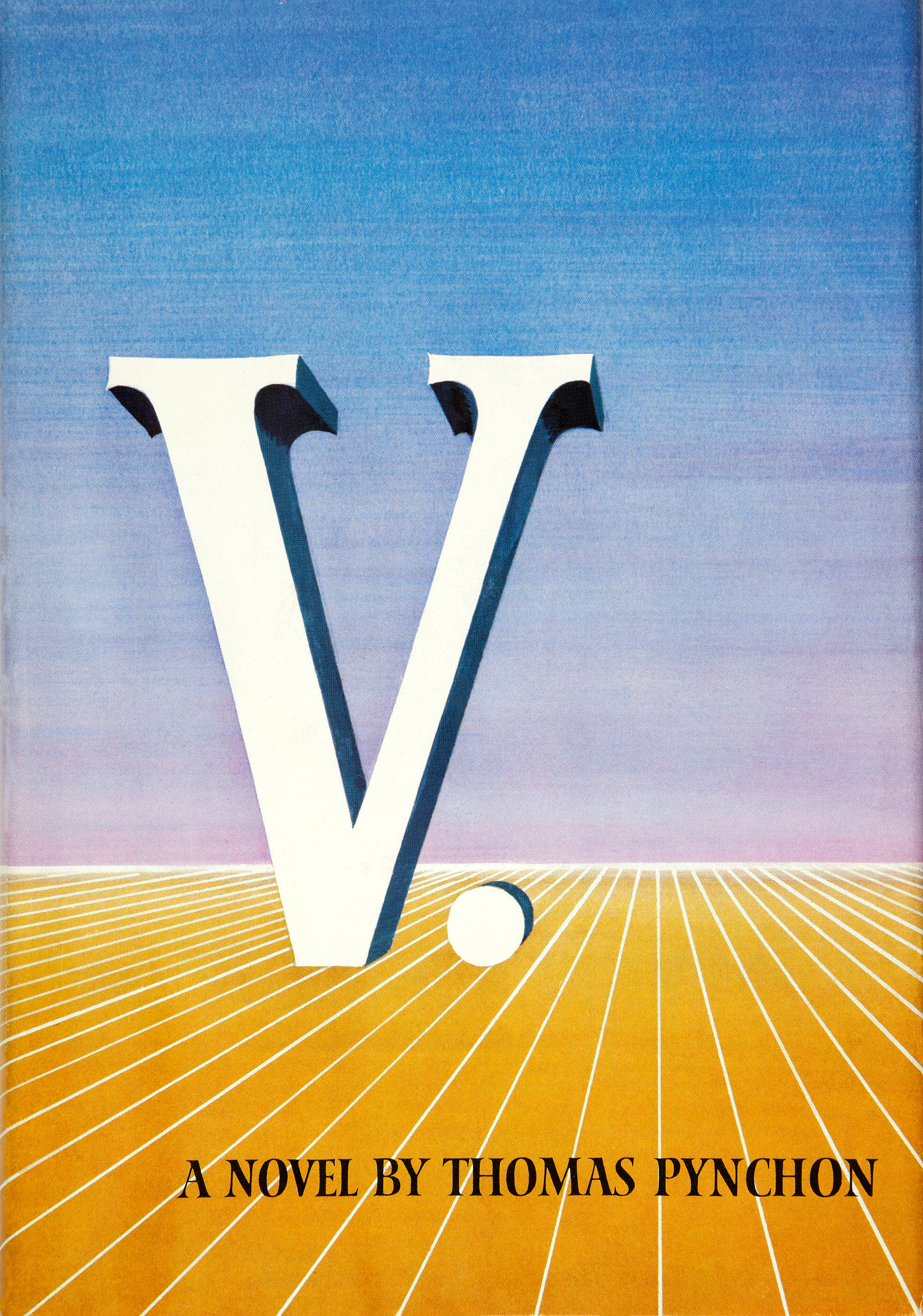
- Cover of first edition
- Author: Thomas Pynchon
- Language: English
- Genre: Postmodern literature, metafiction, satire, paranoid fiction
- Published: March 18, 1963 (J. B. Lippincott & Co.)
- Publication place: United States
- Pages: 492
- ISBN: 9780060913083
- Dewey Decimal: 813.54
- LC Class: PS3566.Y55 V2

V. is a satirical postmodern novel and the debut novel of Thomas Pynchon, published on March 18, 1963. It describes the exploits of a discharged U.S. Navy sailor named Benny Profane, his reconnection in New York with a group of pseudo-bohemian artists and hangers-on known as the Whole Sick Crew, and the quest of an aging traveler named Herbert Stencil to identify and locate the mysterious entity he knows only as "V." It was nominated for a National Book Award.

== Plot summary ==
The novel alternates between episodes featuring Benny, Stencil and other members of the Whole Sick Crew (including Profane's sidekick Pig Bodine) in 1956 (with a few minor flashbacks), and a generation-spanning plot that comprises Stencil's attempts to unravel the clues he believes will lead him to "V." (or to the various incarnations thereof). Each of these "Stencilized" chapters is set at a different moment of historical crisis; the framing narrative involving Stencil, "V.", and the journals of Stencil's British spy/diplomat father threads the sequences together. The novel's two storylines increasingly converge in the last chapters (the intersecting lines forming a V-shape, as it were), as Stencil hires Benny to travel with him to Malta.

=== Chapter One: "In which Benny Profane, a schlemihl and human yo-yo, gets to an apocheir" ===
The opening chapter is set in Norfolk, Virginia, on Christmas Eve, 1955. Benny Profane, a recently discharged seaman, is at a local sailor bar called the "Sailor's Grave" in which every waitress is named Beatrice and the beer taps are rubber model breasts that the sailors suck on. Here Profane meets Ploy, a short violent sailor, his musician friend Dewey Gland, and the Maltese barmaid Paola Hod. Bar owner Mrs. Buffo begins to play a rendition of "It Came Upon the Midnight Clear" to celebrate Christmas only to be immediately assaulted by Ploy and the rest of the intoxicated sailors. The disorder triggers a raid by the military police. Pig Bodine, Paola, Dewey Gland and Profane escape the chaos to Pig's apartment.

=== Chapter Two: "The Whole Sick Crew" ===
The chapter opens with Rachel Owlglass confronting the plastic surgeon Shale Schoenmaker whom she accuses of manipulating her friend and roommate Esther Havitz into debt through repeated rhinoplasty. Schoenmaker responds by entering into a monologue on the nature of Jewish women and the nature of appearance.

Section II is set during a party at Rachel's apartment attended by the "Sick Crew", Paola, Esther, and Debb. This section introduces the character Herbert Stencil, a troubled man who is obsessed with his father's mysterious death in Malta (even more mysterious as Sidney Stencil, Herbert's father, was a British secret agent) and the identity of "V", a woman mentioned in his journal.

=== Chapter Three: "In which Stencil, a quick-change artist, does eight impersonations" ===
This chapter, set among the British community in Egypt toward the end of the 19th century, consists of an introduction and a series of eight relatively short sections, each of them from the point of view of a different person. The eight sections come together to tell a story of murder and intrigue, intersecting the life of a young woman, Victoria Wren, the first incarnation of V. The title is a hint as to how this chapter is to be understood: Stencil imagines each of the eight viewpoints as he reconstructs—we do not know on how much knowledge and how much conjecture—this episode. This chapter is a reworking of Pynchon's short story "Under the Rose", which was first published in 1961 and is collected in Slow Learner (1984). In the Slow Learner introduction, Pynchon admits he took the details of the setting ("right down to the names of the diplomatic corps") from Karl Baedeker's 1899 travel guide for Egypt. Stencil's reconstruction follows the same basic conflict as "Under the Rose", but it gives the non-European characters much more personality.

=== Chapter Four: In Which Esther Gets a Nose Job ===
Section I details the history of Shale Schoenmaker, M.D. and how he began his career as a plastic surgeon. During World War I he eagerly enlists in the A.E.F. hoping to become a pilot but, is instead given a position as an engineer. While serving he witnesses Evan Godolphin, a handsome pilot whom he idealized, become horribly disfigured during an air raid. A month later Schoenmaker visits Godolphin in the hospital while he is recovering from reconstructive surgery, discovering that an incompetent surgeon, Halidom, treated him using the archaic method that would inevitably lead to further disfigurement by infection. This event traumatizes Schoenmaker, causing him to now see it as his mission to help people like Godolphin, a conviction that slowly decays over time.

Stencil comes across Schoenmaker in his search for V. and refers Esther to him for her nose job. At a follow-up appointment Esther and Schoenmaker become lovers.

=== Chapter Five: In Which Stencil Nearly Goes West with an Alligator ===
Only marginally part of the Stencil/V. material, this chapter follows Benny and others, as Benny has a job hunting alligators in the sewers under Manhattan. It figures in the Stencil/V. story in that there is a rat named "Veronica" who figures in a subplot about a mad priest — Father Linus Fairing, S.J. — some decades back, living in the sewers and preaching to the rats; we hear from him in the form of his diary. Stencil himself makes a brief appearance toward the end of the chapter.

=== Chapter Six: In which Profane returns to street level ===
The chapter follows Profane, Geronimo, Angel, and his sister Josephine "Fina" into the city over several nights of drinking. Fina and Profane's relationship develops amid concerns over her status within a local mercenary street gang known as the Playboys, who see her as a spiritual figurehead. The chapter ends amid a massive brawl, nearby which Fina is found lying naked and smiling.

=== Chapter Seven: She hangs on the western wall ===
In Florence in 1899, Victoria appears again, briefly, but so does the place name "Vheissu", which may or may not stand for Vesuvius, Venezuela, a crude interpretation of wie heißt du, translating into what are you called/what is your name in the German language, or even (one character jokes) Venus. The chapter also revolves around an attempted burglary of Botticelli's The Birth of Venus by Hugh Godolphin through the Venezuelan consulate.

=== Chapter Eight: In which Rachel gets her yo-yo back, Roony sings a song, and Stencil calls on Bloody Chiclitz ===
The chapter begins with Benny Profane, freshly unemployed after being laid-off from sewer-alligator hunting, in search of a job in Manhattan. After briefly contemplating the nature of money on a park bench, he, by chance, looks at an advertisement issued by The Time/Space Employment Agency. Once arriving at the agency he finds, much to his annoyance, that the secretary is his former lover Rachel Owlglass. In section IV Stencil continues his investigation of the perplexing "V." (whom he now believes is either Victoria or the rat Veronica) meeting up with a Yoyodyne engineer Kurt Mondaugen.

=== Chapter Nine: Mondaugen's story ===
Kurt Mondaugen, who will appear again in Gravity's Rainbow, is the central character in a story set in South West Africa (now Namibia) partly during a siege in 1922 at which one Vera Meroving is present, but most notably in 1904, during the Herero Wars, when South West Africa was a German colony.

=== Chapter Ten: In which various sets of young people get together ===
McClintic Sphere, an alto sax player in a jazz band, returns home to his boarding house in Harlem. The previous week, spent playing primarily for condescending, snobby Ivy League students, has left him exhausted, and he relaxes in his room with a prostitute named Ruby. Benny, meanwhile, finally gets a job at Anthroresearch Associates, where he's introduced to SHROUD, a synthetic humanoid with whom he holds imaginary conversations. Pig Bodine and Roony Winsome get into a fight, based on Roony's suspicion that Pig is involved with his (Roony's) wife, Mafia. Meanwhile, Mafia aggressively pursues sex with Benny, who declines. Schoenmaker and Esther get into a few arguments because he says he wants to bring out her inner beauty by performing more plastic surgery on her. The chapter finishes out with the Whole Sick Crew hanging out in various places: Sheridan Square, the Rusty Spoon, Slab in front of his Cheese Danish No. 35 canvas. Stencil, looking for Rachel at her apartment, comes upon Paola who gives him the Confessions of Fausto Maijstral.

=== Chapter Eleven: Confessions of Fausto Maijstral ===
Fausto Maijstral, Maltese civilian suffering under the German bombardment and working to clear the rubble during World War II writes a long letter to his daughter Paola, who figures in the Benny Profane story; the letter comes into Stencil's hands. The letter includes copious quotations from Fausto's diary. Besides the place name Valletta, V. figures in the story as an old — or possibly not-so-old — woman crushed by a beam of a fallen building.

=== Chapter Twelve: In which things are not so amusing ===
Roony and Mafia continue fighting, so Roony meets up with McClintic at the V-Note, and they travel to Lenox, Massachusetts. Returning to Matilda's boardinghouse, they meet up with Ruby, who Roony recognizes as being a member of the Crew in disguise. Esther tells Slab she is pregnant. He wants to send her to Cuba to get an abortion, and raises the money by announcing his intentions and asking for money at a party the Crew is throwing in an abandoned warehouse. Roony's attempts to deal with his wife then take a dark turn, but he is saved by Pig. At an airport, Esther and Slab attempt to catch Esther a flight to Cuba, but meet some resistance. Paola, traveling with McClintic, reveals her true identity to him. He delivers the line, "Keep cool, but care," considered the novel's central theme, as they drive off into the Berkshires.

=== Chapter Thirteen: In which the yo-yo string is revealed as a state of mind ===
Benny loses his job at Anthroresearch Associates by sleeping in and not being at work to notify the attendant technician that several calamities have occurred in the lab. Rachel nudges him to get a new job, and says that she will find one for him herself. An amusing story unfolds about Benny and Pig during their Scaffold days. Benny, unable and unwilling to get work, instead takes a self-described vacation and chooses to spend his spare time at the Rusty Spoon. He gets drunk with Stencil, who relates the entirety of his knowledge of V. as it stands to this point in the novel. Valletta being the last place on Stencil's journey to find information about V., he asks Benny to accompany him and Paola to the island. Benny and Stencil commit a robbery in perilous circumstances, and then, in late September, they embark for Malta with Paola on board the Susanna Squaducci.

=== Chapter Fourteen: V. in love ===
In this chapter, V. is entranced by a young ballerina, Mélanie l'Heuremaudit. The story centers on a riotous ballet performance, almost certainly modeled in part on the premiere of Igor Stravinsky's The Rite of Spring. The performance centers on a virgin sacrifice by impalement. The young ballerina fails to wear her protective equipment and actually dies by impalement in the course of the performance; everyone assumes her death throes simply to be an uncharacteristically emotional performance.

=== Chapter Fifteen: Sahha ===
Benny and Pig Bodine have one last adventure with two girls, Flip and Flop, as they all get drunk and wander around Washington D.C.. There are two going away parties for Benny, and the chapter ends with Benny, Stencil, and Paola leaving for Malta aboard the Susanna Squaducci as the Crew looks on and says goodbye.

=== Chapter Sixteen: Valletta ===
"Kilroy" schematic. Technically, a band-pass filter.

As the Royal Navy mass on Malta in the early stages of the Suez Crisis, Stencil arrives with Benny in tow, searching for Fausto Maijstral. (As always, Kilroy was here first, and Pynchon proposes a novel origin for the face: that Kilroy was originally a schematic for part of a band-pass filter.) While Stencil is able to find Maijstral, he discovers very little from Paola's father and departs without Profane (who stays with Fausto) and Paola (who, after visiting her husband, decides to return to the States).

=== Epilogue ===
The last chapter is a flashback to Valletta when Stencil, Sr. was still alive. After World War I he is sent to Malta to observe the various crises going on involving the natives and their desire for independence. He is implored by Maijstral's wife (who is pregnant with Fausto) to relieve him of his duties as a double agent because she fears for his life. Stencil, Sr. meets Veronica Manganese or V and implicitly has sex with her (she is now largely made up of artificial limbs). It is revealed they had trysted in Florence after the riots. He finds out that Maijstral is having an affair with her as well.

Linus Fairing is also working as a double agent for Stencil, and when he leaves for America, having tired of the life of a spy, Stencil's purpose for being in Malta is null.

V releases Stencil from her auspices and Maijstral as well.

Stencil sails off into the Mediterranean and a waterspout blows the ship up into the air, then down into the depths.

== Characters ==
=== Major characters ===
- Benny Profane – The protagonist and a self-proclaimed human yo-yo.
- Rachel Owlglass – An upper-class woman from the affluent Five Towns on the south shore of Long Island.
- Herbert Stencil – A troubled Englishman who is obsessed with the identity of "V.", a woman who is mentioned in his father's journal written shortly before he disappeared in Malta. Stencil speaks almost exclusively in the third person.

=== Minor characters ===
- Clayton "Bloody" Chiclitz, the founder of Yoyodyne Inc.
- Angel – Puerto Rican sewer alligator hunter and friend of Profane
- Fina – Angel's sister, she acts as a saint to the Playboy gang, often quelling disputes between them and other gangs over territory. In chapter six it is heavily implied that she is raped by the same gang.
- Geronimo
- Slab
- Melvin
- Raoul
- Debb Sensay
- Brad
- Roony Winsome
- Mafia Winsome
- Paola Maijstral – Maltese immigrant who Profane estimates to be roughly sixteen. Sometime during World War II, Paola marries Pappy Hod to gain entrance to the United States.
- Esther Harvitz – Rachel's Jewish roommate whom Rachel financially supports.
- McClintic Sphere
- Fergus Mixolydian – An "Irish Armenian Jew" and the "laziest living being in Nueva York". Fergus is so lethargic that the only activity that he takes part in excluding television is once a week "to fiddle around at the kitchen sink with dry cells, retorts, alembics, salts solutions."
- Shale Schoenmaker, M.D. – a Jewish plastic surgeon who specializes in rhinoplasty. Schoenmaker decides to become a plastic surgeon during World War I while working as an engineer in the Aviation Section. During this time he witnesses pilot Evan Godolphin become disfigured after a mission in which his plane was heavily damaged.
- Dudley Eigenvalue, D.D.S, -- Stencil's dentist and "psychodontist" in whom he confides. Eigenvalue also possesses a prized pair of titanium dentures in a museum display case in his offices.
- Ploy – An engineer on the mine sweeper Impulsive. Standing five feet tall in boots, Ploy has an extremely violent temperament, oftentimes attempting to start fights with the largest sailors. Ten months before the beginning of the first chapter Ploy's teeth are removed by the Navy, being replaced by a pair of dentures. Ploy entertains himself by biting barmaids at the Sailor's Grave on the buttocks.
- Pig Bodine – A perverted member of the Sick Crew. Prior to joining the crew, Bodine was enlisted on the U.S.S. Scaffold where he operated a pornographic lending library and would write fetish erotica using the ship telegraph. Bodine's knees have the odd ability to lock in place allowing him to effectively sleep while standing, much to the astonishment of the navy physicians.
- Kurt Mondaugen – An engineer who works at Yoyodyne who is interviewed by Stencil.

== Analysis and reception ==
It has been suggested that Vladimir Nabokov's novel The Real Life of Sebastian Knight was a strong influence on Pynchon. V. resembles Nabokov's novel in plot, character, narration and style, and the title alludes directly to Nabokov's narrator "V."

Time wrote "In this sort of book, there is no total to arrive at. Nothing makes any waking sense. But it makes a powerful, deeply disturbing dream sense. Nothing in the book seems to have been thrown in arbitrarily, merely to confuse, as is the case when inept authors work at illusion. Pynchon appears to be indulging in the fine, pre-Freudian luxury of dreams dreamt for the dreaming. The book sails with majesty through caverns measureless to man. What does it mean? Who, finally, is V.? Few books haunt the waking or the sleeping mind, but this is one. Who, indeed?"

Tony Tanner considered the novel an exploration of the plots individuals ascribe to the ambivalent universe they have no choice but to confront, during a 20th-century period in which genuine communication between individuals has been eroded and in which ambiguous societal forces are at work (intentionally or inadvertently) towards a state of entropy; "SHROUD asks, 'Has it occurred to you there may be no more standards for crazy or sane, now that it's started?' And Benny answers, 'What, for Christ's sake?' What the 'it' is that has started (if there is an 'it'), what common process links remote imperialist incidents with contemporary automation, tourism, Hitler, and the Whole Sick Crew (if there is any linking common process)—this is what the whole book is about."

Writing in The New York Times, George Plimpton called Pynchon "a young writer of staggering promise", lauding his "vigorous and imaginative style", "robust humor" and "tremendous reservoir of information".

In 1964, the novel was awarded a William Faulkner Foundation Award for best debut novel.

== Editions ==
In 2012, it emerged that there were multiple versions of V. in circulation. This was due to the fact that Pynchon's final modifications were made after the first edition was printed and thus were only implemented in the British, or Jonathan Cape, edition and the Bantam paperback. The fact was forgotten soon after in the U.S., so most US editions, including the newly released eBook, follow the first printing and are therefore unauthorized versions of the text, while the British editions, which follow the first edition printed by Jonathan Cape, contain Pynchon's final revisions.

== In popular culture ==
- The line "Yesterday's headlines blown by the wind" in English rock band Radiohead's 2003 song "Scatterbrain" was inspired by a passage from the novel.
- Mimi and Richard Fariña's 1965 debut album, Celebrations for a Grey Day, includes an instrumental entitled "V." which is linked directly to the novel in the liner notes.
- A suite of songs on the 1969 album Volume Two by Soft Machine is titled "Esther's Nose Job", referring to Chapter 4: "In which Esther gets a nose job."
- The English band Benny Profane took their name from Pynchon's character.
- The Insect Trust's 1970 album Hoboken Saturday Night includes the song "Eyes of a New York Woman", with lyrics taken from the novel. The same lyrics form the basis of a different song, "V. in Love", from the album Colour Out of Space by Favorite Color.
- Alan Moore's V for Vendetta includes the title character V quoting and reading from Pynchon's book.
- Some aspects of Paul Thomas Anderson's The Master (2012) are based on V., such as the protagonist being a discharged sailor and his connection with a cult-like group of individuals.
- The lead singer of alternative rock band Thrice, Dustin Kensrue, found the phrase "Vheissu" in V., which he was reading in early 2002 and used it as a title for their fourth studio album.

== Bibliography ==
- Grant, J. Kerry. A Companion to V. Athens: University of Georgia Press, 2001.
- Herman, Luc, and John Krafft. Becoming Pynchon: Genetic Narratology and V. Columbus: Ohio State University Press, 2023.
- Simonetti, Paolo, and Umberto Rossi (eds.). Dream Tonight of Peacock's Tails: Essays on the Fiftieth Anniversary of Thomas Pynchon's V. Newcastle upon Tyne: Cambridge Scholars Publishing, 2015. ISBN 9781443877671
