= Sax Pax for a Sax =

Studio album by Moondog
- Released: November 28, 1997
- Recorded: 1994
- Genre: Chamber music; minimalism; avant-garde jazz; classical jazz
- Length: 42:19
- Label: Atlantic Records

Sax Pax for a Sax is a collaboration album between the London Saxophonic and the blind musician, composer, and performer Moondog. The album was recorded in 1994 and released on November 28, 1997. The album marks Moondog's re-emergence into the American jazz market.

== Critical reception ==
The album was well received by the public and peaked at number 22 on the Billboard Albums. Entertainment Weekly magazine called the album a "hypnotic blend of jazz and classical music" and gave it a B.

The music critic David D. Duncan says that the album "sounds like a nostalgic big band on laughing gas".

Another music critic Ian Koss said that the "music on Sax Pax for a Sax is bold assertive-even at its most demure the saxophone can't help its brassy nature-powerful without losing grace". He also explains: "Increasingly larger groups of saxophones interplay in melodies that weave through kettledrum pillars in a way that is equal parts Philip Glass and Paul McCartney."

A review by John Murph for "JazzTimes" said: "A stargazing composer, Moondog's penchant for crafting accessible, yet utterly otherworldly melodies bridges European classical forms with American jazz sensibilities."

== Track listing ==
1. Dog Trot
2. Paris
3. Bird's Lament
4. Sandalwood
5. Tout Suite No. 1 in F Major 1 Mov.
6. Tout Suite No. 1 in F Major 2 Mov.
7. Tout Suite No. 1 in F Major 3 Mov.
8. D for Danny
9. New Amsterdam
10. Sea Horse
11. Fiesta
12. Novette No. 1 in D Flat Major 1 Mov.
13. Novette No. 1 in D Flat Major 2 Mov.
14. Novette No. 1 in D Flat Major 3 Mov.
15. Single Foot
16. Mother's Whistler
17. Present for the Prez.
18. Shakespeare City
19. Golden Fleece
20. Hymn to Peace
21. EEC Lied

== Personnel ==
The album features Moondog on the bass drum, Tim Redpath and Bradley Grant on the soprano sax, Rob Buckland, Bradley Grant and Simon Haram on the alto sax, Rob Buckland, Gareth Brady, and Andy Scott on the tenor sax, Jon Rebbeck and Chris Caldwell on the baritone sax, and Will Gregory on the bass sax. There are nine total saxophonists on this album and some songs will feature anywhere from just four of them to all nine. There are also other instruments and musicians featured such as Danny Thompson on the contra bass, Liam Noble on the piano, and Paul Clarvis on the snare drum.
