= Forshaw =

Forshaw is a surname that may relate to:

- Adam Forshaw, English footballer for Leeds United;
- Christian Forshaw, British musician;
- Dick Forshaw (1895 – 1963), British footballer;
- Jeff Forshaw (born 1968), British professor of particle physics;
- Joseph Forshaw (ornithologist), Australian ornithologist;
- Joseph Forshaw (athlete) (1881–1964);
- Michael Forshaw (born 1952), Australian senator;
- Mike Forshaw (born 1970), British rugby league coach;
- Thelma Forshaw (1923–1995), Australian writer;
- William Thomas Forshaw (1890–1943), English soldier.
