= Insect Trust Gazette =

The Insect Trust Gazette was a poetry journal published at Temple University in Philadelphia. Three issues appeared from 1964 - 1968. It was edited by Leonard Belasco, Jed Irwin, Robert Basara, and William Levy.

The journal's name was derived from a phrase in William S. Burroughs' novel Naked Lunch about a "a trust of giant insects from another galaxy." The editors added "gazette" to it. Burroughs contributed texts to the first two issues. The journal folded in 1968.

A folk/jazz/blues group in the late 1960s, The Insect Trust, took its name from the journal. An urban legend known as "John Fare" originated from a story called "The Hand" by N.B. Shein, published in a 1968 volume.
