= John Fare =

Urban legend

John Fare (sometimes John Charles Fare or John Fahey or John Faré) is a fictional performance artist who allegedly used robotic surgery to remove parts of his body onstage as part of his act. His final performance was allegedly suicide by beheading. The story originated in 1968 and is generally considered an urban legend.

== Sources for story ==
The original version was "The Hand" by N.B. Shein, published in Insect Trust Gazette in 1968. In November 1972, Tim Craig published an embellished version of Shein's original story in reply to a letter to the editor of Studio International. The reader was inquiring about an artist named Fahey who ended his career by having his head amputated onstage.

In Craig's embellished version of Shein's original, John Charles Fare was born in 1936 in Toronto and attended Forest Hill College. In 1959 he moved to London to study architecture at the Bartlett School of Architecture, but soon left to live in Copenhagen. He was briefly held in a mental health facility for exposing himself in public at performances. After his release, he was re-arrested for gluing objects to a car. The car's owner, musician and inventor Golni Czervath, did not press charges and befriended Fare. The two developed a robotic operating table with painter Gilbert Andoff. The first performance was a lobotomy on Fare in June 1964. All performances were performed on a Friday. By the time Fare performed at the Isaacs Gallery in Toronto on 17 September 1968, he "was short one thumb, two fingers, eight toes, one eye, both testicles, and several random patches of skin." The amputated parts were preserved in alcohol. That evening, he had his right hand amputated. Fare's body was fitted with small microphones, which transmitted his pulse and breathing frequency in a distorted fashion. Craig said Fare had performed six more shows between 1968 and 1972.

In 1985 Danny Devos wrote to Isaacs Gallery founder Avrom Isaacs enquiring about John Fare and his supposed performance in 1968. The response included a statement in writing that the story of John Fare "has no factual basis," adding "there was no such person as John Fare as far as I know."

== Response ==
The story was reprinted in a fanzine made in collaboration with the band Coil in 1987. That publication included more correspondence with Isaacs, who said, "I know of no such person as John Fare. In the sixties I had a series of mixed media concerts in my gallery, and out of this came the myth of John Fare. Every five years or so, someone rediscovers the myth and writes me a letter such as yours." Fare's alleged performance was emulated during a Nocturnal Emissions concert in London in 1997. Writing about the event, a British music journalist recounts: "Fare cuts an eccentric figure. He wears trousers made from zips and has a diagram of a brain tattooed onto his shaven scalp. The performance artist placed his left hand on a chopping board with the fingers spread. Fare’s assistant, Jill Orr, is partially sighted and she slammed an axe between her boyfriend’s pinkies with increasing speed. Eventually the axe severed Fare’s little finger. This was the end of the performance art element within the evening’s entertainment". Fare has been mentioned in connection with body art, industrial culture, and the practices of Rudolf Schwarzkogler and Bob Flanagan, and, like other performance artists, has been seen as a successor of the Christian martyrs. He has also been mentioned in the Guardian in connection with the German artist Gregor Schneider Critic Audrone Zukauskaite examined the durability of this legend in Art Lies magazine. Artists Gabriel Lester, Mariana Castillo Deball, "the estate of John Fare," René Gabri, Mario Garcia Torres, and Juozas Laivys explored themes of the story in a 2007 Gallery GB Agency exhibit in France. While Lester acknowledged Fare was "an apparition, an artist thought to have existed," he said Fare embodied the culmination of romantic myth of the artist cursed, "someone who has probably never existed, and yet lives forever." Christopher Priest wrote the short story "The Head and the Hand" with a similar plot in 1972.

== See also ==
- Crimes of the Future, a film about performance artists who do surgery on themselves
