= Andy Scott (saxophonist) =

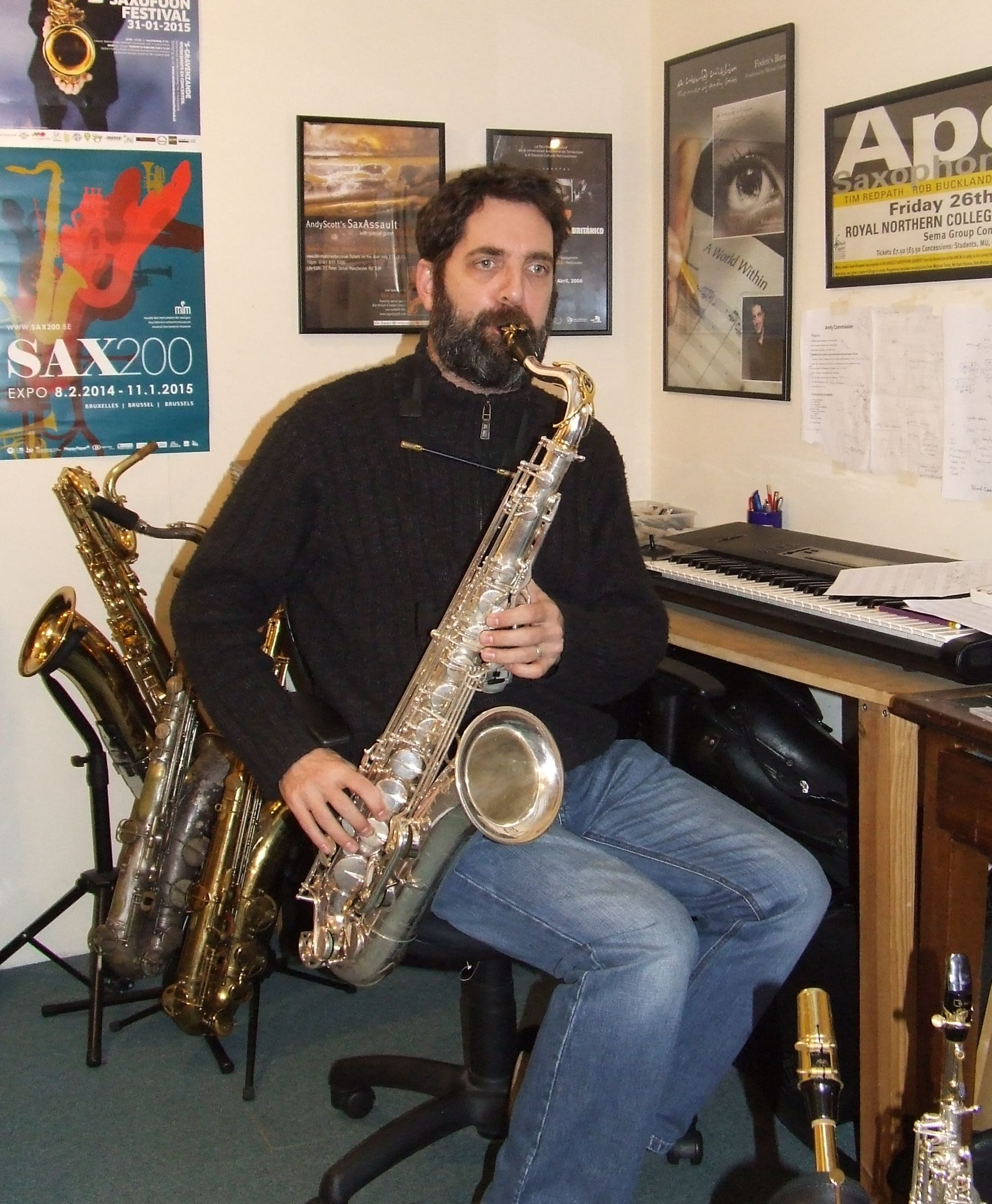

Background information
- Born: 15 June 1966 (age 60); Bournemouth, England
- Genres: Jazz, classical
- Occupations: composer, saxophonist, educationalist
- Instrument: Saxophone
- Years active: Mid-1980s–present
- Labels: Astute Music Ltd; Nimbus Alliance, Decca/Argo, Black Box, BMG and Quartz
- Website: Andy Scott

Andy Scott (born 15 June 1966 in Bournemouth) is a British tenor saxophonist, "equally at home in jazz and classical contexts", and award-winning composer who has made "important and sometimes mould-breaking contributions to the repertoire". He is currently Composer in Residence for Foden's Band. He has played with the Halle Orchestra, has formed and played with several ensembles whose musical style is rooted in big band jazz, Latin and funk.

== Career ==
=== Saxophonist ===
Andy Scott is a founder member and saxophonist of the Apollo Saxophone Quartet. Formed in 1985, it won the 1992 Tokyo International Chamber Music Competition, and has commissioned over 100 contemporary works for saxophone quartet. He is the founder and lead saxophonist of SaxAssault, that has collaborated with guest artists Bob Mintzer and Gwilym Simcock. He also plays as a duo with percussionist Dave Hassell, and formed Caliente, a trio with Clare Southworth and Lauren Scott, in 2011.

His album, My Mountain Top, consists of works for tenor saxophone by contemporary composers; "Summer with Monika" is based on the words of Roger McGough's poem of the same name, and he performed the "Concerto for Stan Getz" by Sir Richard Rodney Bennett with the BBC Concert Orchestra at the Queen Elizabeth Hall in the composer's 70th birthday concert on 2 March 2006, broadcast live by BBC Radio 3.

=== Composer ===
Andy Scott won a British Composer Award in 2006 for Dark Rain, a concerto for two saxophones and wind band, which was premiered by John Harle and Rob Buckland at the World Saxophone Congress XIV in Slovenia in 2006. He was shortlisted again in 2012, for his work "Spirit of Mingus", commissioned by Foden's Band, and premiered at the Royal Northern College of Music Festival of Brass, conducted by Michael Fowles, on 28 January 2012. He was also shortlisted for the 2015 awards, for his work "A Child Like You", commissioned by PRS for Music Foundation's new Music Biennial, that premiered on 2 May 2014 at the RNCM by Foden's Band, and performed at two special events in London and Glasgow to coincide with the 2014 Commonwealth Games in Glasgow, and broadcast on BBC Radio 3.

He has written several commissions for the Apollo Saxophone Quartet, including a four movement work "His Phantom Sweetheart", and "My Mountain Top", with spoken words by poet Lemn Sissay, which are both on the album Words and Pictures.

Since 2008 Andy Scott has been Composer in Residence with Foden's Band. Their CD of his works, A World Within, won British Bandsman CD of the Year 2010, and recordings by Les Neish (tuba) and Glyn Williams (euphonium) featuring his compositions won awards in 2011. His works feature on recordings by Gerard McChrystal (saxophone), Rob Buckland (saxophone) and Simone Rebello (vibraphone), Andy Findon (flute), Aquarelle Guitar Quartet, Veya Saxophone Quartet, Nigel Wood (soprillo saxophone), British Clarinet Ensemble, National Saxophone Choir, Arabesque Duo, and David Thornton (euphonium). His work, The Bad Tempered Flute – The Flute Music of Andy Scott, was released in 2011, with Paul Edmund-Davies, Clare Southworth and Andy Findon (flute), Peter Lawson and Tim Carey (piano), Lauren Scott (harp) and Craig Ogden (guitar).

He has composed commissions for Aquarelle Guitar Quartet, Park Lane Group, James Gourlay, Les Neish and Foden's Band, RNCM Big Band, Apitos, Kintamarni Saxophone Quartet, Rob Buckland and Simone Rebello, British Clarinet Ensemble, SaxAssault, RNCM Saxophone Choir, Arabesque Duo, Clare Southworth, Mike Hall, Wigan Jazz Orchestra, Associated Board of the Royal Schools of Music, Tubalate and Lancashire Sinfonietta.

His work "Sin Bin" is a six-minute commission from the Arts Council that mimics a Warrington Wolves rugby league football match which sees two musicians 'sin binned' halfway through the piece.

=== Educationalist ===
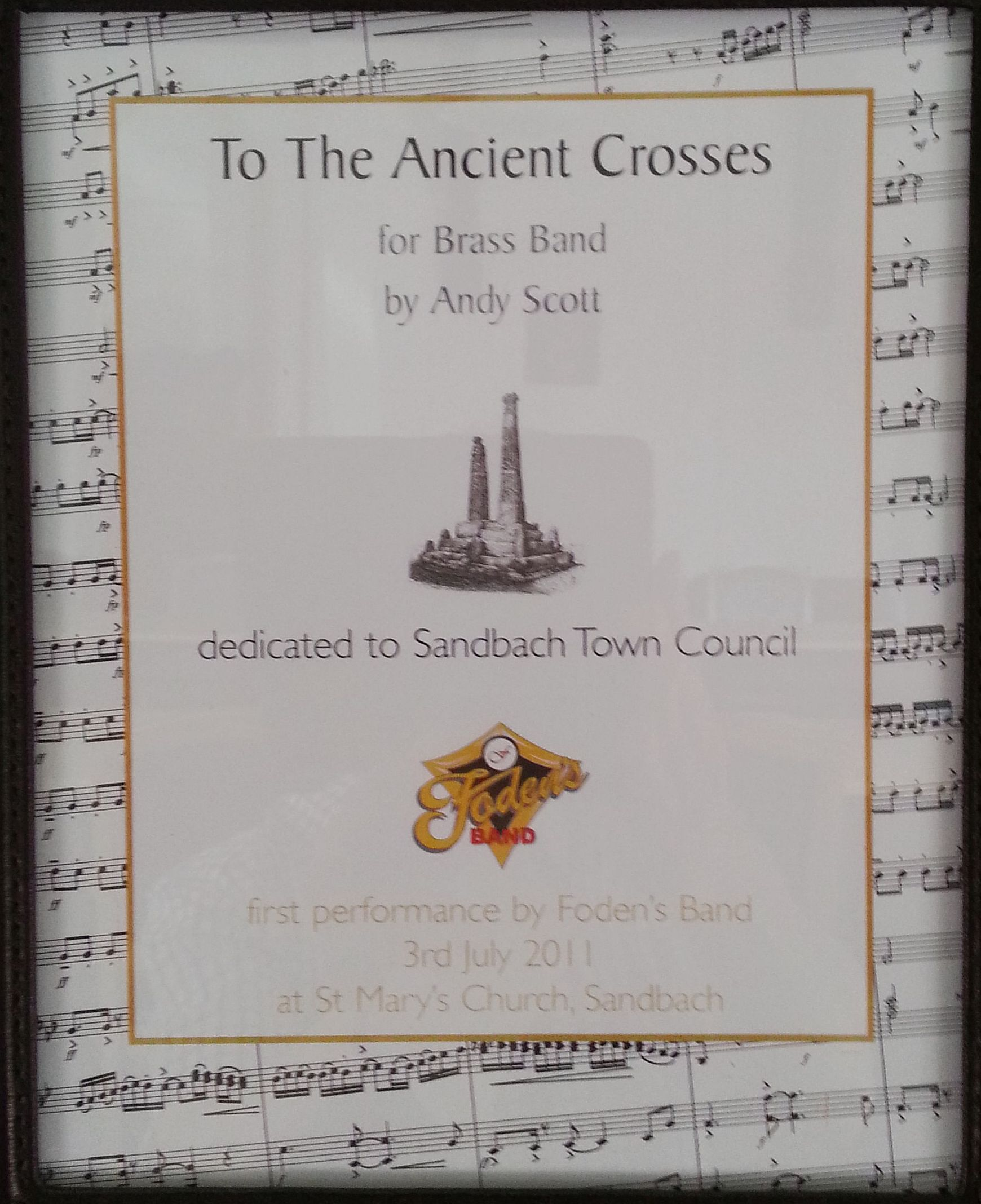
Certificate acknowledging the work "The Ancient Crosses", "a piece composed by Andy Scott as a gift to Sandbach", displayed in the Council Chamber at Sandbach Literary Institution, and referring to the Saxon Sandbach Crosses.

Scott is a saxophone tutor at the Royal Northern College of Music in Manchester. In 2010 with his wife, the harpist Lauren Scott, he co-founded and is also artistic director of the Sandbach Concert Series, which provides a platform for local youngsters to perform on the same bill as professional musicians. Scott is also co-founder with co-director Rob Buckland, of the RNCM Saxophone Day, the UK's largest annual event of its kind, takes masterclasses in the UK and France, has run courses in association with the National Saxophone Choir of Great Britain and their musical director and conductor, Nigel Wood, and co-directs the RNCM Saxophone Orchestra with Rob Buckland/

In 2003 he formed the World Tenor Saxophone Consortium in order to co-commissioned a work from Graham Fitkin, "Passing", that was premiered in 10 countries simultaneously. He was vice-chairman of the International Saxophone Committee 2009–2012, and director of the tenor saxophone programme in the World Saxophone Congress XVI in St Andrews, Scotland in July 2012. Andy Scott is an endorsee of Selmer and Vandoren.

In 2012, Scott conceived and co-founded with Matt London and Jenni Watson, the Tenor Saxophone Index, an online repertoire resource, funded by an RNCM Small Research Grant. The site was official launched at the World Saxophone Congress, and its patrons are James Houlik and Branford Marsalis. Scott has also contributed pieces that are on the examination syllabuses of ABRSM and Trinity Guildhall.

== Ensembles ==
- Apollo Saxophone Quartet (formed 1985): Current members Rob Buckland, Carl Raven, Jim Fieldhouse; Former members Tim Redpath, Jon Rebbeck, Will Gregory, David Roach
- London Saxophonic (formed 1991): With Gareth Brady, Rob Buckland, Chris Caldwell, Christian Forshaw, Bradley Grant, Will Gregory, Simon Haram, Paul Stevens (saxophone), Paul Clarvis (drums), Liam Noble (piano), Richard Pryce (bass). Notable works: An Eye for a Difference - Music of Michael Nyman, Sax Pax For A Sax with Moondog & The London Saxophonic.
- SaxAssault (formed 1994): With Rob Buckland, Carl Raven, Simon Willescroft, Dave Graham, Mike Hall, John Helliwell, Chris Caldwell, Jim Fieldhouse (saxophone), Gwilym Simcock (piano), Laurence Cottle (bass), and Elliot Henshaw (drums); guest artists Bob Mintzer (saxophone), Gwilym Simcock (piano); former members: Andy Morel, George King (piano), Ollie Collins (bass)
- Dave Hassell – Andy Scott Duo (formed 1988): With percussionist Dave Hassell
- Caliente (formed 2011): With flautist Clare Southworth and harpist Lauren Scott
- Trio Halata: With Paul Mitchell-Davidson (guitar), Geth Griffith (double bass)

== Discography ==
=== Saxophonist ===
- With Apollo Saxophone Quartet

Bow Out (1992), First and Foremost (1994), Words and Pictures (1998), Works for Us (2001), Short Cuts (2004), Three Quartets (2006) (by Barbara Thompson) Perspectives (2014)

- With SaxAssault

Bang! (1996), Sax of Gold (2007)

- With London Saxophonic

Sax Pax for a Sax (1997), An Eye for a Difference - Music of Michael Nyman (1998) Pineapple Express (Original motion picture soundtrack) (2008)

- Others

My Mountain Top (2006)(solo), Sand Dancer (2005), with Dave Hassell, Xilitla: Stairway to the Sky (2010), with Dave Hassell and Evaristo Aguilar

=== Composer ===
- Spirit of Foden's: The Music of Andy Scott, by Foden's Band
- A World Within by Foden's Band
- The Bad Tempered Flute by Paul Edmund-Davies, Clare Southworth and Andy Findon (flute), Peter Lawson and Tim Carey (piano), Lauren Scott (harp) and Craig Ogden (guitar)
- Salt of the Earth by Les Neish (tuba)
- Double Trouble by Les Neish and James Gourlay (tuba)
- The Lure of the Red Jacket by Glyn Williams (euphonium)
- Aria by Gerard McChrystal (saxophone)
- Into the Light by Equivox Trio: Rob Buckland (saxophone) and Simone Rebello (vibraphone)
- Density 21.5 by Andy Findon (flute)
- Dances by Aquarelle Guitar Quartet
- On a Lighter Note by Veya Saxophone Quartet
- Soprillogy by Nigel Wood (soprillo saxophone)
- Looping the Loop by British Clarinet Ensemble
- Sax to the Max by National Saxophone Choir
- Sonata by Arabesque Duo (flute and harp)
- Devil's Duel by David Thornton (euphonium)
