= The Viking of Sixth Avenue =

Compilation album by Moondog
- Released: July 10, 2005
- Label: Honest Jon's
- Compiler: Edwin Pouncey, Howard Williams, Mark Ainley

The Viking of Sixth Avenue is a compilation album by Moondog, released by Honest Jon's on July 10, 2005. It was the first compilation of Moondog's music that spanned his entire music career over several music labels. The compilation was praised by various publications including The Guardian, AllMusic and All About Jazz who all proclaimed it as the perfect introductory release for new listeners.

== Music ==
The music of The Viking of Sixth Avenue has been described as varied, with Sean Westergaard noting that the music ranged from "full orchestras to solo performances and from brief rhythmic percussion exercises to vocal rounds to swinging horns or dulcimers." David Peschek of The Guardian described the music as "almost jazz" and that it contained "his pieces for percussion, brass and the odd howling canine, and occasional, madrigal-like songs".

The recordings on the album span from Moondog's recordings from 1949 to 1995.

== Critical reception ==
Professional ratings
Review scores
Source	Rating
All About Jazz	5/5 stars
AllMusic	4.5/5 stars
The Guardian	5/5 stars

David Pescheck of The Guardian gave the album a five star rating, praising the compilation as being the first compilation that spanned his recording period (from 1945 to 1995) and that the album was that "rare thing in music: unique." Sean Westergaard of AllMusic gave the album a four and a half star rating out of five, describing it as "probably the best introduction to Moondog's music that's out there". Chris May of All About Jazz awarded the album a five star rating, proclaiming that "The world is a better place for his music, and if you haven't heard any of it yet, this rich and beautiful collection is the perfect place to start."
