= H'art Songs =

Studio album by Moondog
- Released: 1978
- Recorded: 1977
- Studio: Rhein-Ruhr-Film Tonstudio
- Genres: Contemporary classical; pop
- Language: English
- Labels: Kopf; Managarm Musikverlag

H'art Songs is an album by the American composer and musician Moondog, released in 1978 via Kopf.

== Background and recording ==
H'art Songs was the second album Moondog made in Germany, and in comparison to the first, Moondog in Europe, it consists of more new material and is song-driven. The songs were written and recorded in 1977. Moondog described the songs in the liner notes as having "an appeal to a whole range of tastes". The satirical lyrics deal with Moondog's view of life and subjects including animal rights, the exploitation of natural resources and the outlaw John Wesley Hardin.

== Reception ==
Professional ratings
Review scores
| Source | Rating |
|---|---|
| AllMusic | 3/5 stars |

The New York Times called H'art Songs "intricate instrumentals superimposed against a simple repetitive melody with the engaging lyrics of [Moondog's] verses, familiar to many New Yorkers."

The critic David Keenan wrote: "The 10 superficially simplistic piano-led pop songs, with lyrics like diamond-sharp haiku, open out with each listen to reveal a musical aesthetic as melodically complex as Johann Sebastian Bach's." Mark Allender of AllMusic described the songs as "little ditties" and wrote that the album combines few and repetitive chord changes with melodies that feel "grandiose or celestial" which makes "the music feel bigger or fuller than it is", creating an exciting effect. Allender complimented Moondog's baritone voice but wrote that the songs can be "a bit too singsongy for more pedestrian tastes and so political that the art suffers somewhat". He described it as "interesting" as a contrast to Moondog's "more complex compositions". Moondog's biographer Robert Scotto wrote that "the novelty is in the subject matter, eccentric yet lyrical, offbeat yet alluring".

== Track listing ==
All tracks are written by Moondog.

Side one
| No. | Title | Length |
|---|---|---|
| 1. | "I'm Just a Hop Head" | 2:42 |
| 2. | "High on a Rocky Ledge" | 4:25 |
| 3. | "Do Your Thing" | 3:07 |
| 4. | "Enough about Human Rights" | 3:35 |
| 5. | "I'm This, I'm That" | 3:47 |
| 6. | "Aska Me" | 1:58 |

Side two
| No. | Title | Length |
|---|---|---|
| 1. | "I'm in the World" | 3:38 |
| 2. | "Here's to John Wesley Hardin" | 5:58 |
| 3. | "Choo-Choo Lullaby" | 5:51 |
| 4. | "Pigmy Pig" | 3:15 |

== Personnel ==
- Moondog – harmonica, keyboards, percussion, vocals
- Fritz Storfinger – keyboards, piano

== Usage in media ==
- The song "Do Your Thing" is played over the end credits of the 2026 dark comedy The Drama.
