= Elpmas =

Studio album by Moondog
- Released: 1992
- Studio: Academy of St. Martin's in the Streets
- Genre: Contemporary classical
- Labels: Kopf; Managarm Musikverlag
- Producers: Moondog; Andi Toma

Elpmas is an album by the American composer and musician Moondog, released in 1992 via Kopf.

== Background and recording ==
Elpmas was recorded at Academy of St. Martin's in the Streets, a studio in Germany owned by Andi Toma. The album's title is the word "sample" read backwards; it was the first time Moondog used sampling in his music.

== Reception ==
Der Spiegel wrote that the music on Elpmas lies between folk music and minimal music and called it pleasant. "Blue" Gene Tyranny of AllMusic described it as a "wonderful CD built from environmental sounds, gently rocking marimbas, lovely counterpoint for winds, foot-taping rhythms, and sweetly sung wisdom from a chorus". Moondog's biographer Robert Scotto called it "the strangest of his German productions and in many ways the most like his earliest New York albums". He wrote that it primarily appealed to those who appreciated Moondog's eclectic side and propensity to move his music into new phases and that it confused those who expected a unified expression. He called it "a little too much over the edge perhaps".

== Track listing ==
All tracks are written by Moondog.

Side one
No.	Title	Length
1.	"Wind River Powwow"	7:11
2.	"Westward Ho!"	6:00
3.	"Suite Equestria (Trail Versus Road and Trail)"	7:14
4.	"Marimba Mondo 1: The Rain Forest"	5:33
5.	"Fujiyama 1 (instr.)"	4:43
6.	"Marimba Mondo 2: Seascape of the Whales"	5:51
7.	"Fujiyama 2 (Lovesong)"	5:01
8.	"Bird of Paradise"	2:40
9.	"The Message (a cappella male chorus)"	1:01
10.	"Introduction and Overtone Continuum"	2:25
11.	"Cosmic Meditation"	24:10

== Personnel ==
- Henry Schuman – oboe
- Peter Wendland – violone, viol
- Johannes Leis – piccolo, saxophone (alto, tenor, bass)
- Götz Alsmann – banjo
- Andi Toma – vocals, whistling
- Akbar Huck – vocals
- Max Alsmann – vocals
- Nobuko Sugai – recitation
- Moondog – keyboards, percussion
