= Moondog (1969 album) =

1969 studio album by Moondog

Studio album by Moondog
- Released: October 1, 1969
- Recorded: 1969
- Studio: Old Church, New York City
- Genre: Contemporary classical; third stream
- Length: 30:19
- Label: Columbia Masterworks
- Producer: James William Guercio; Al Brown

Moondog chronology
The Story of Moondog (1957)	Moondog (1969)	Moondog 2 (1971)

Singles from Moondog
- 1. "Stamping Ground" / "Theme"

Moondog is an album by the American composer Moondog, released by Columbia Masterworks Records on October 1, 1969. The album was made on the initiative of the producer James William Guercio and recorded at Columbia's main studio with Moondog conducting 50 musicians. It consists of compositions written by Moondog in the 1950s and '60s as he moved from jazz conventions into becoming a classical composer, resulting in a combination of classical influences and elements of what critics have described as minimalist music and third stream. The album includes short symphonic-styled works, canons, chaconnes and a couple of jazz-inspired tracks, one in memory of Charlie Parker.

Moondog received considerable media exposure and positive reviews. It peaked as number six on the Billboard chart for classical music. Moondog was regarded as an eccentric, known for standing at a street corner in New York dressed in a homemade Viking costume, and the album contributed significantly to his reputation as a serious composer.

== Background ==
Louis Hardin (1916 – 1999), a blind composer and musician who was born in Kansas as the son of a priest, moved to New York City in 1943 and took the name Moondog in 1947. From the late 1940s until 1974, he was known as an eccentric figure in New York's street life, standing at a street corner selling his music and writings or performing his own music. He received some attention from journalists and musicians and made a series of recordings from 1949 to 1957, including the live EP On the Streets of New York (1953) and four studio albums: Moondog and His Friends (1953), released by Epic Records, and Moondog (1956), More Moondog (1956) and The Story of Moondog (1957), released by Prestige Records. In the 1960s he developed his image and worldview: he dressed in a homemade Viking-inspired costume, was a neopagan who believed in the Norse gods and set up an altar at his country retreat in Candor. He moved away from the jazz idiom of his early works and toward being a classical composer. By the late 1960s he praised classicism and rejected the belief that there is such a thing as originality.

In 1969, Moondog was approached by James William Guercio, who was the producer of the bands Chicago and Blood, Sweat & Tears, accompanied by a representative from Columbia Records. Guercio had met Moondog a couple of years previously, admired his work and persuaded Columbia to let him produce a Moondog album. Moondog signed a contract for two albums with Columbia on March 6, 1969. The terms included that the record company's executives were not allowed to hear the music ahead of recording.

== Composition and recording ==
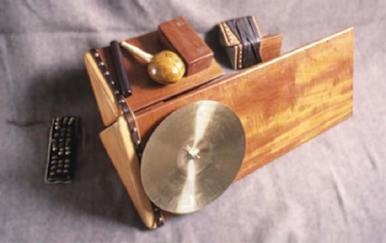
The trimba is a percussion instrument invented by Moondog.

The music on Moondog was composed in the 1950s and early '60s and rescored for orchestra. Guercio and Al Brown, who functioned as Moondog's manager, co-produced the album and the latter put together an ensemble of 50 musicians. Few of Moondog's custom-made instruments were used; they had previously been among his more distinctive features. Only two of his instruments were used in additional to the conventional orchestra: a percussion instrument he called the trimba and a new bowed instrument he called hus, from the Norwegian word for "house".

Work on Moondog began in May and studio recording started on June 3, 1969, without any rehearsals. The album was recorded in Columbia's main studio Old Church on East 33rd Street, where Moondog conducted the orchestra. He described the opportunity to conduct the musicians in the studio as "one of the biggest thrills" of his life. Moondog was also a poet and recited two of his epigrams for the album. The first of these couplets is located between the first and second track and the second opens side two.

== Music ==
Moondog begins with "Theme", a cross between or combination of chaconne and ground played in 5/4 time. Moondog described it as "my theme, a sort of musical signature". A previous version had been recorded for Moondog and His Friends where it appeared on the track "Theme and Variations". In the earlier version, Moondog played all instruments, whereas for the 1969 version it was reworked into a maxisym. Maxisym was Moondog's own term for a composition for a full orchestra; its opposite was a minisym, written for a handful of musicians.

"Stamping Ground" was written in the 1950s and not previously recorded. It takes inspiration from Native American music and is constructed with a canon melody line, a four-note ground played on timpani and a coda that ends in retardation.

"Symphonique #3 (Ode to Venus)" is another update of a composition featured on Moondog and His Friends. It is an enlarged version, six minutes long, of the second movement of that album's "Suite No. 2", which in its earlier version was two and a half minutes long. It is a canon in twelve parts and an homage to Pyotr Ilyich Tchaikovsky.

Side one ends with "Symphonique #6 (Good for Goodie)", a ground inspired by swing music. The composition has much melodic detail. It features a clarinet that uses high notes in the vein of Benny Goodman.

"Minisym #1" was first performed in 1967 and consists of three short movements in 4/4 time. The album notes describe the first movement as "jovial", the second as "lyrical" and the third as "vivacious". The first and third feature a bassoon and the second is played with horn.

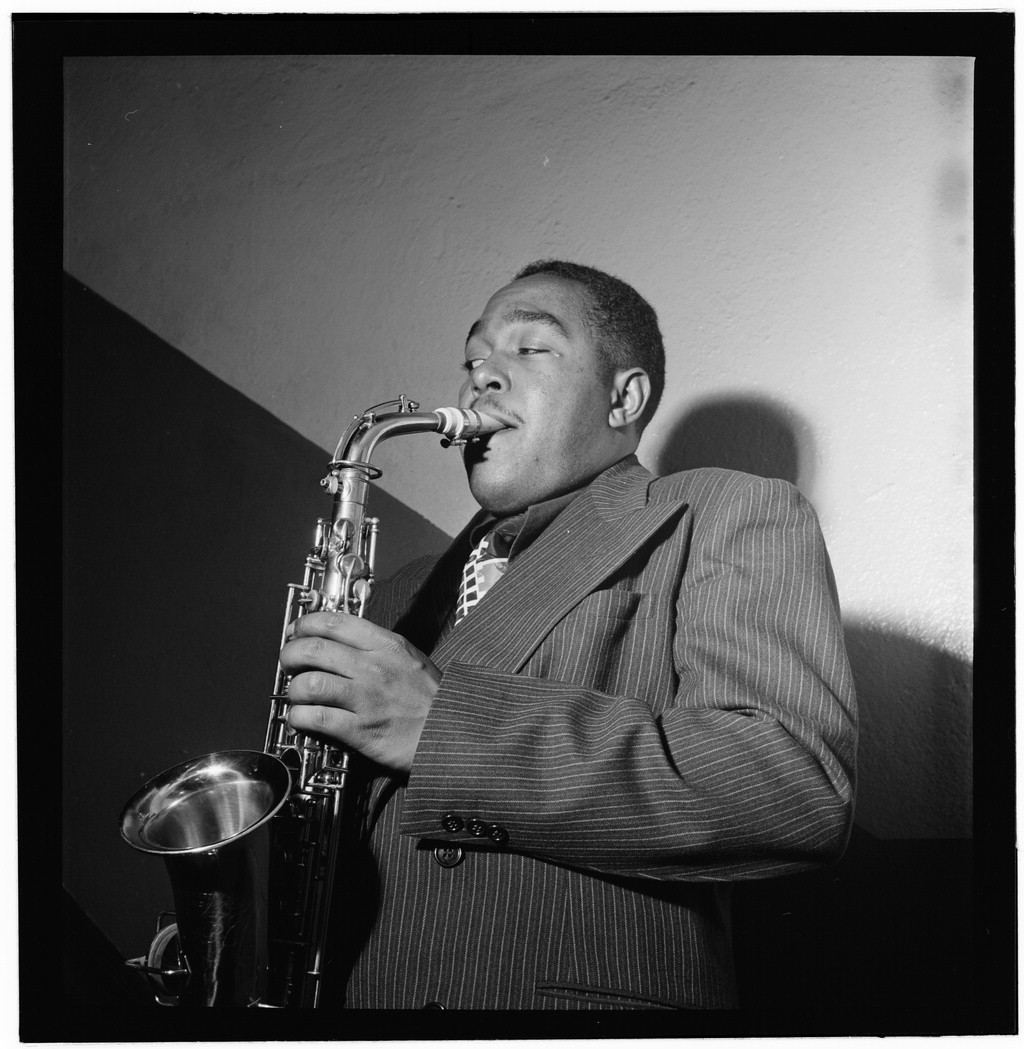
"Bird's Lament" honors Charlie Parker (1920 – 1955).

"Lament 1 (Bird's Lament)" is a chaconne where a saxophone accentuates the melody. Along with "Good for Goodie" it represents Moondog's interest in jazz music in the 1950s. It was composed in 1955 after the death of the saxophonist Charlie Parker, who was nicknamed "Bird" and who Moondog had known in the early 1950s. The two had discussed music and the prospect of performing together.

The longest track on Moondog is the six-and-a-half minute "Witch of Endor", which also is the album's most academic composition. It consists of three movements. The first is a canon in minor and 5/4 time inspired by Anatolian music that represents a witch's dance, the second a trio representing the demise of the Biblical King Saul, and the third repeats the first. "Witch of Endor" was composed around 1965. According to the album's liner notes, it was originally for a ballet intended for the dancer and choreographer Martha Graham. It is uncertain if Graham ever was aware of its existence.

"Symphonique # 1 (Portrait of a Monarch)" is Moondog's final track and was written in 1960. The ambition was to capture both the playful side and the strength of Moondog's fictional character Thor the Nordoom, the protagonist of a "soundsaga" or "poetic myth" he had developed. The central theme is about how the old, personified by a ruthless and clever "Emperor of Earth", manages to assume power over the new.

== Release ==
Ahead of the release of Moondog, Moondog moved from his usual New York location at 53rd and 6th to the CBS Building at 51 West 52nd Street, where he remained until the end of the summer of 1970. The album was released under the Columbia Masterworks Records label on October 1, 1969 and received much publicity. Moondog was interviewed in newspapers and on radio, and appeared on television shows including The Today Show, The Merv Griffin Show and The Tonight Show. During the latter appearance he conducted the studio orchestra for a performance of "Bird's Lament".

Moondog's cover features a photograph of Moondog in profile with the title Moondog on top as the only text. It is a fold-out cover where the front and back form a 24 in × 12 in (61 cm × 30 cm) poster of the composer in his Viking costume. Program notes on the inside contain Moondog's thoughts on classicism and adherence to modal rules. "Stamping Ground" was released as a single with "Theme" as its B-side in 1970.

== Reception ==
Professional ratings
Review scores
Source	Rating
DownBeat	4/5 stars
AllMusic	5/5 stars

The reviews were overwhelmingly positive when Moondog first was released. Alan Rich of New York magazine wrote that the album combines simplicity and subtlety with a sense of spontaneity, and that his fears that the unpretentious and rhythmical qualities of Moondog's earlier releases would be lost in the symphonic orchestration turned out to be unfounded. He said the music has "old-fashioned" elements reminiscent of Johannes Brahms, Felix Mendelssohn and Maurice Ravel but retains Moondog's "airy" textures and "buoyant rhythmic organization". Entertainment Today said the album ended Moondog's status as "a freak attraction", describing him as "a fine rich-sounding composer". Variety stressed the serious impression of the album and said it deserves its place in the Masterworks series. Stephen Smoliar of Boston After Dark wrote that he was disappointed by Moondog's combination of classical and modern elements, because he did not think it reached its potential. Smolier said the recording of the minisym was a failure but called the album overall "one of the more stimulating musical oddities of the twentieth century".

According to the music journalist Stuart Jeffries, Moondog and its successor Moondog 2 (1971), also released by Columbia, became "as much student must-haves as Che T-shirts" in the 1970s. Pitchfork's Thea Ballard wrote in 2017 that the album's combination of classical European elements and rhythms from New York's minimalist music makes it absorb "the essence of an era while peering beyond it". Stewart Mason wrote for AllMusic: "Although Moondog is often thought of as a mere exotica novelty, thanks to the composer's eccentricities, it is, in fact, one of the finest third stream jazz albums of its era." In an article for Record Collector on the roots of American progressive rock, Kris Needs described Moondog as "an early living embodiment of the exotic prog persona", and added that the album was "one of the era's most spiritedly creative ventures in bringing classical music with a jazzman's twist, to mainstream rock audiences."

Moondog entered the Billboard chart for best-selling classical albums as number 39 on October 25, 1969. It peaked as number 6 on December 12. It fell from the chart in January 1970. At the time, the album was reported to have sold 25,000 copies within a month, although Moondog's biographer Robert Scotto says this was an exaggeration. "Stamping Ground" was successful in the Benelux region.

== Legacy ==
"Stamping Ground" was used as theme music for the Holland Pop Festival, held in Rotterdam in June 1970. The festival, which drew around 150,000 people, is the subject of the 1971 documentary film Stamping Ground directed by George Sluizer and Hansjürgen Pohland. The film The Big Lebowski (1996) features "Stamping Ground" on its soundtrack, where it functions as a contrast to the musical taste of the film's protagonist. The British DJ Mr. Scruff used the recording of "Bird's Lament" as the uncredited basis for his track "Get a Move On!" (1999), which has been used in car commercials. "Theme" was featured in the 2026 film Send Help.

== Track listing ==
All tracks are written by Louis Hardin, also known as Moondog.

Side one
No.	Title	Length
1.	"Theme"	2:35
2.	"Stamping Ground"	2:36
3.	"Symphonique #3 (Ode to Venus)"	5:51
4.	"Symphonique #6 (Good for Goodie)"	2:45

Side two
No.	Title	Length
5.	"Minisym #1"; I. "Allegro"; II. "Andante Adagio"; III. "Vivace"	5:45
6.	"Lament 1 (Bird's Lament)"	1:42
7.	"Witch of Endor"; I. "Dance"; II. "Trio": A. "Adagio (The Prophecy)", B. "Andante (The Battle)", C. "Agitato (Saul's Death)"; III. "Dance (reprise)"	6:29
8.	"Symphonique #1 (Portrait of a Monarch)"	2:36
Total length:		30:19

== Personnel ==
Credits are adapted from the album's sleeve notes.

- Flute: Harold Bennet, Andrew Lolya, Harold Jones (piccolo), Hubert Laws (piccolo)
- English horn: Henry Shuman, Irving Horowitz
- French horn: James Buffington, Richard Berg, Ray Alonge, Brooks Tillotson
- Clarinet: Jimmy Abato, George Silfies, Phil Bodner
- Bass clarinet: Ernie Bright
- Bassoon: Jack Knitzer, Don Macourt, Ryohei Nakagawa, George Berg, Wally Kane, Joyce Kelly
- Baritone saxophone: Wally Kane
- Trumpet: Joe Wilder
- Bass trumpet: Danny Repole
- Tuba: Don Butterfield, Bill Stanley
- Tenor tuba: Bill Stanley, Bill Elton, John Swallow, Phil Giardina
- Tenor trombone: Tony Studd, Charles Small, Buddy Morrow
- Bass trombone: Paul Faulise
- Percussion: Jack Jennings, Dave Carey, Elayne Jones, Bob Rosengarden
- Violin: Paul Gershman, Aaron Rosand
- Viola: Emanuel Vardi, David Schwartz, Eugene Becker, Raoul Poliakin
- Cello: George Ricci, Charles McCracken
- Contrabass cello: Joe Tekula
- Tenor: Raoul Poliakin, Eugene Becker
- Bass: George Duvivier, Ron Carter, Alfred Brown, Louis Hardin
