= Bert Prentice =

American professional wrestler (1958–2021)

Personal information
- Born: Bert Prentice; March 26, 1958 (age 68) Estherville, Iowa, U.S.
- Died: August 4, 2021 (aged 63)

Professional wrestling career
- Ring name: Christopher Love
- Billed weight: 343 lb (156 kg)
- Debut: 1983

Bret Christopher Prentice (March 26, 1958 – August 4, 2021) was an American professional wrestling manager and promoter in Tennessee. He worked for the United States Wrestling Association during the 1990s.

== Professional wrestling career ==
Prentice began his professional wrestling career in 1983 for Joe Blanchard's Southwest Championship Wrestling in Texas.

He would then work for the Memphis promotion United States Wrestling Association as a manager and occasionally wrestled where he made his debut in 1991. Also managed Tully Blanchard and Gangrel in the independents.

He feuded with Miss Texas from 1992 to 1993.

Then in 2002, he worked for Total Nonstop Action Wrestling (TNA), hosting their syndicated show Xplosion with Jeremy Borash.

He was inducted into the Tennessee Wrestling Hall of Fame by Jerry Lawler in 2019.

== Death ==
Prentice died from cancer on August 4, 2021 at 63.

Prentice's biography "Tonight! Tonight! Tonight!" was posthumously released two months after his death. It was co-authored by Scott Teal.
