= Christian Forshaw =

British saxophone player and composer

- Born: Knaresborough, Yorkshire, UK
- Education: Guildhall School of Music & Drama
- Occupations: Saxophone player; Composer
- Website: www.christianforshaw.com

Christian Forshaw is an English saxophone player and composer.

Christian Forshaw was born in Knaresborough, Yorkshire and graduated from the Guildhall School of Music & Drama in 1995 with distinction. He then began working with some of the world’s finest ensembles including the London Sinfonietta, the Chamber Orchestra of Europe, the Royal Liverpool Philharmonic Orchestra and the Philharmonia Orchestra. He has collaborated with Tenebrae, Voces 8, Brian Eno, Moondog, Damon Albarn, Hugh Jackman and the BBC Singers amongst many others. Since 2002 Forshaw has been Professor of Saxophone at the Guildhall School of Music & Drama.

Forshaw is a member of Notes Inégales, directed by Peter Wiegold, and was featured as soloist with the group in 2005 playing Donatoni’s Hot. He has also made solo appearances with the Scottish Ensemble, giving several critically acclaimed performances of Richard Rodney Bennett’s Concerto for Alto Saxophone and Strings, and with the London Sinfonietta in 2002 performing Pedro Rebello’s Aquas Liberas at the Queen Elizabeth Hall.

Forshaw's debut album Sanctuary (QTZ2009) combines saxophone, voices, church organ and percussion in arrangements of sacred melodies as well as original composition. Sanctuary reached No.1 in both the Amazon.co.uk Classical Chart and New Zealand’s Concert FM charts, and made the Classic FM "Hall of Fame" in 2005.

In 2006 Forshaw turned down a four album deal with SonyBMG in favour of setting up his own label, IntegraRecordsUK. This was to avoid having to consider market forces when creating further albums; something he felt would kill the creative process. His second album, Renouncement, was released on Integra in April 2007. He was subsequently commissioned to write a piece in memory of victims of the London bombings of 2005.

== Albums ==
- Sanctuary (2004)
- Renouncement (2007)
- Midwinter (2008)
- Reflections of France (2008)
- Songs of Solace (2012)
- Historical Fiction (2021)
