= Moondog (1956 album) =

1956 studio album by Moondog

Studio album by Moondog
- Released: 1956
- Recorded: 1956
- Genre: Classical, minimalism, avant-garde
- Length: 30:13
- Label: Prestige Records
- Producer: Bob Weinstock

Moondog chronology
Moondog and His Friends (1953)	Moondog (1956)	More Moondog (1956)

Moondog is an album by the American composer and musician Moondog, released by Prestige Records in 1956. Moondog had released the same music on his own label earlier that year as Snaketime Series. Moondog was at the time a young composer in New York City who had attained some recognition. He was signed by Prestige Record, where Moondog became the first of three Moondog albums produced by Bob Weinstock. It contains eclectic works from Moondog's first decade as a composer.

== Background ==
Louis "Moondog" Hardin was a blind street musician in New York City who had achieved some publicity and acclaim with a series of recordings in the early 1950s, some on his own labels and some released by established record companies. In 1955 he released a single with the tracks "Caribea" and "Oo Debut". They became part of his LP Snaketime Series, released in 1956 on his own label. The same year he signed with Prestige Records which released the album Moondog with the exact same content as Snaketime Series. It became the first of three Moondog albums produced by Bob Weinstock and released by Prestige over the next couple of years.

The material on the three Prestige records represents Moondog's output from his first decade as a composer and his way of performing on the streets during these years. As for his outlook at the time they were released, they were already outdated; new influences such as Edgard Varèse and the realism of Niccolò Machiavelli had begun to lead him in new directions.

== Release ==
Although Snaketime Series and Moondog have the same content, Moondog's biographer Robert Scotto says their cover art reveal how they were intended for different audiences. Snaketime Series has a photograph of Moondog happily playing a flute on a rooftop, accompanied by his wife Mary who holds a Japanese short sword, and on the back identifies the other performers as "friends". Prestige's Moondog shows the composer as a shadowy and imposing loner and contains a text about his "eclectic approach to composition". According to Scotto, Snaketime Series focuses on Moondog as a street performer whereas the Prestige album presents him as a composer of progressive jazz.

== Reception ==
AllMusic's Richie Unterberger highlighted the unconventional nature of Moondog, which uses a lot of repetition, is driven by maraca and clave beats, features Asian influences and incorporates animal noises. He called the album unpredictable and idiosyncratic and described the music as "very enigmatic yet attention-holding stuff, ripe for discovery by new generations". Scotto describes it as "Moondog on nature" and contrasts it with the love theme of the second Prestige album. He counts "Caribea", "Tree Trail", "Frog Bog" and Surf Session" to the composer's early, eclectic and dynamic way of working, whereas "To a Sea Horse", "Death, When You Come to Me" and "Trees Against the Sky" point toward his later works, saying they "underscore the power of Moondog's unadorned style". The Encyclopedia of Popular Music rates Moondog four out of five stars, signifying an "excellent" album.

== Track listing ==
All tracks are written by Louis Hardin, also known as Moondog.

Side one
No.	Title	Length
1.	"Caribea"	1:33
2.	"Lullaby"	2:16
3.	"Tree Trail"	2:18
4.	"Death, When You Come to Me"	2:06
5.	"Big Cat"	1:52
6.	"Frog Bog"	2:12
7.	"To a Sea Horse"	1:45
8.	"Dance Rehearsal"	0:54

Side two
No.	Title	Length
9.	"Surf Session"	6:58
10.	"Trees Against the Sky"	0:52
11.	"Tap Dance"	1:19
12.	"Oo Debut"	1:10
13.	"Drum Suite"	2:20
14.	"Street Scene"	3:37
Total length:		30:13
