= The Insect Trust =

American jazz-based rock band from New York

The Insect Trust was an American jazz-based rock band that formed in New York, United States, in 1967.

== Background ==
The members of the band were Nancy Jeffries on vocals, Bill Barth (1942-2000) on guitar, Luke Faust (b. 1936), formerly of the Holy Modal Rounders, on guitar, banjo, fiddle, and harmonica, Trevor Koehler (1935-1975) on saxophone, and Robert Palmer (1945–1997) on clarinet and alto saxophone. Elvin Jones (1927-2004) and Bernard Purdie (b. 1939) both drummed with the group at times. Bill Folwell (1939-2019), who had played with Albert Ayler (and later an original member of The Mystic Knights of the Oingo Boingo), on bass and trumpet; as well as Warren Gardner on trumpet and clarinet, were part of the band by the time they recorded their second album.

According to The New York Times, the band took its name from William S. Burroughs's novel Naked Lunch, detailing a race of giant insects bent on world domination. However, according to Bill Barth, the name came from the poetry journal Insect Trust Gazette, published by William Levy. Levy took the name from Burroughs, Warren Gardner then gave it to the band.

== Musical style ==
Reviewing their 1970 album Hoboken Saturday Night, Robert Christgau wrote in Christgau's Record Guide: Rock Albums of the Seventies: "The blues scholars in the group have been listening to a lot of Arabic and Eastern European music lately, but this doesn't stop Elvin Jones from sounding just like Elvin Jones. In short, these passionate humanists also sound friendly and have come up with a charming, joyous, irrepressibly experimental record." Fellow critic Tom Hull wrote of the music in 2005, "Even today it is sui generis, and only partly a creature of its time. They weren't anywhere near jazz, even though two members played reeds and flutes, and the guy they brought in to play drums on the album was none other than Elvin Jones. They mixed the horns with banjo and steel guitar, took lyrics from Thomas Pynchon and one member's six-year-old son, and featured a singer, Nancy Jeffries, whose in-your-face style anticipated the Waitresses' Patty Donahue. This was eclectic bohemia, postmodern before modernism had given up the ghost."

== Legacy ==
Robert Palmer later became a well-respected and widely published rock critic and blues/jazz historian and served as the popular music editor of The New York Times in the 1980s. Nancy Jeffries became an executive at A&M, Virgin, and Elektra.

== Death ==
- Trevor Koehler died in 1975, aged 40.
- Robert Franklin Palmer Jr. died November 20, 1997, aged 52.
- William Henry "Bill" Barth died July 14, 2000, aged 57.
- Former member, Bill Folwell, died on October 2, 2019, at the age of 80.

== Discography ==
- 1968: The Insect Trust
- 1970: Hoboken Saturday Night
