= List of premature professional wrestling deaths =

People associated with professional wrestling who died before age 65

A 2014 study by Eastern Michigan University of professional wrestlers who were active between 1985 and 2011, found that mortality rates for professional wrestlers are up to 2.9 times greater than the rate for men in the wider United States population, with cardiovascular-related deaths being 15.1 times higher than the general population, drug overdose-related deaths being 122.7 times greater than the general population, and cancer deaths being 6.4 times higher than the general population. A 2014 report by John Moriarty of the University of Manchester and Benjamin Morris of FiveThirtyEight also found that the mortality rate for professional wrestlers was significantly higher than that of athletes in other sports.

Experts suggest that a combination of the physical nature of the business, no off-season, and potentially high work load, with some wrestlers fighting more than 100 and even 200 matches per year, along with the drug culture in wrestling in the 1970s, 1980s, and early 1990s contributes to high mortality rates among wrestlers. Another 2014 study ascribes the higher death rate largely to higher rates of cardiovascular disease compared to the general population, with morbidly obese wrestlers being especially at risk.

Many promotions employ performers as "independent contractors" and do not offer company-sponsored group health insurance coverage in most instances. This is said to have a causal connection to their longevity, morbidity, and mortality. WWE performers' status as independent contractors was spotlighted by John Oliver on an episode of his show Last Week Tonight with John Oliver in March 2019, with Oliver calling on WWE fans to protest at WrestleMania 35. The WWE denied Oliver's critique.

The concept of the untimely deaths of professional wrestlers was a frequent topic of discussion on the Opie & Anthony show. After Scott Hall's death in 2022, Bret Hart and Kevin Nash talked about the premature death of several wrestlers, mentioning the mental and body damage as possible causes.

== List ==
=== Under 20 ===
Age	Ring name (Birth name)	Promotion(s) worked for	Date of birth	Date of death	Cause of death
18	Janet Wolfe (Jeanette Boyer)	NWA	June 13, 1933	July 28, 1951	Brain haemorrhage

=== Under 30 ===
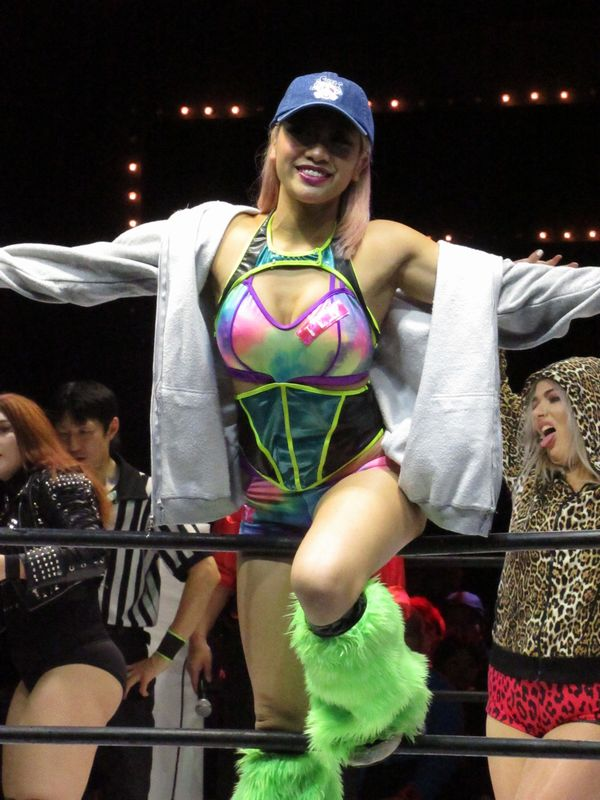
Hana Kimura

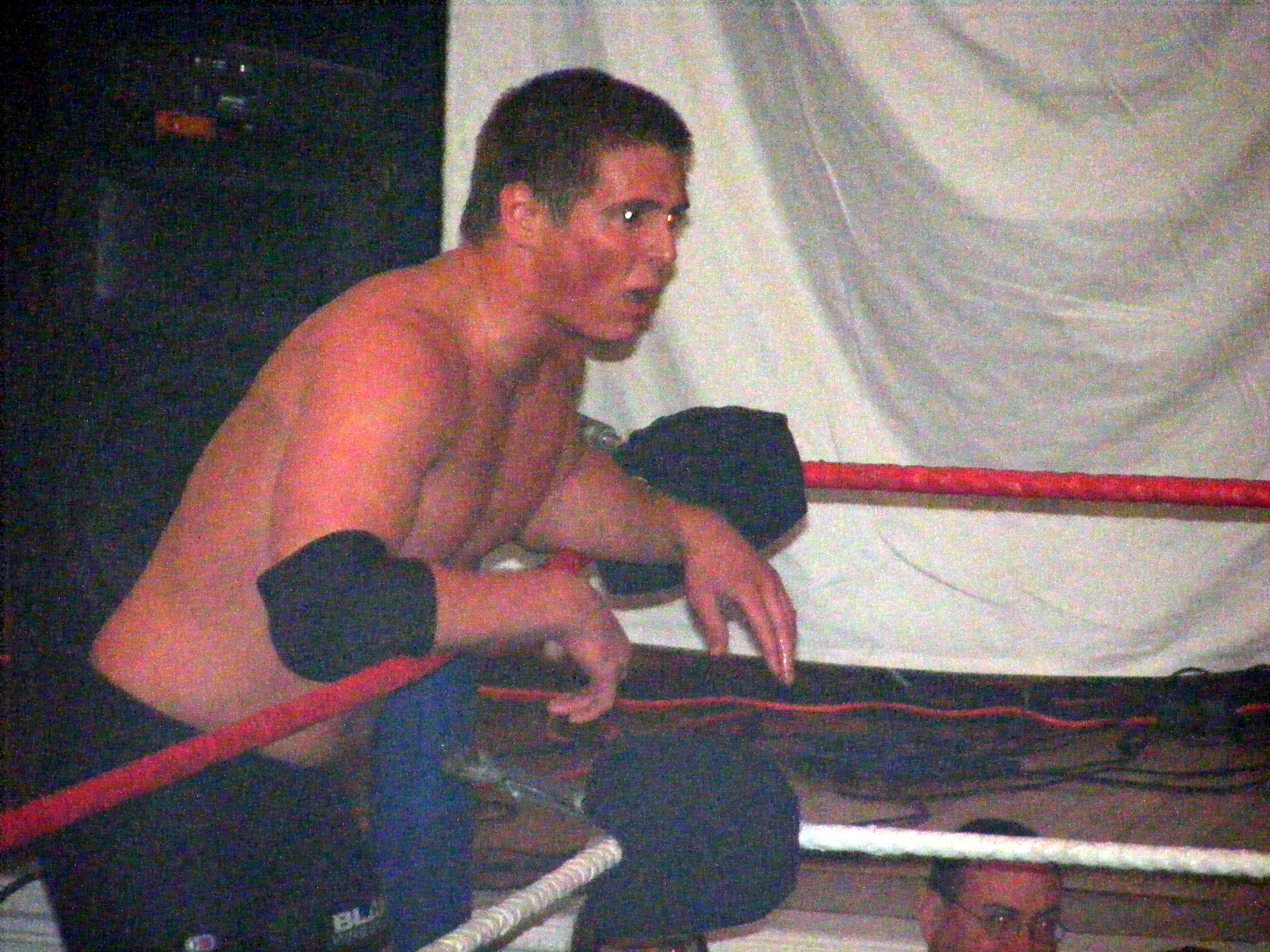
Reid Flair

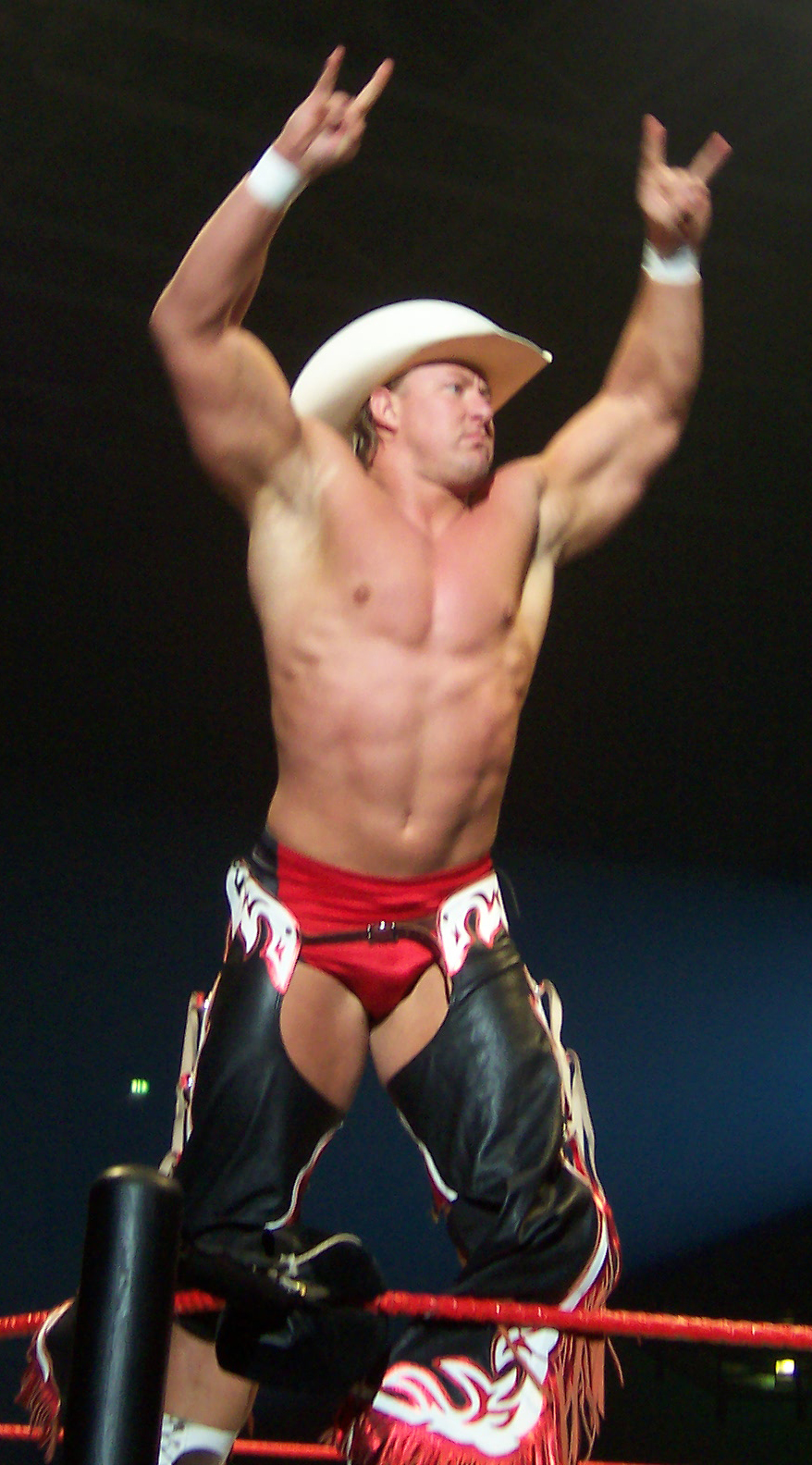
Lance Cade

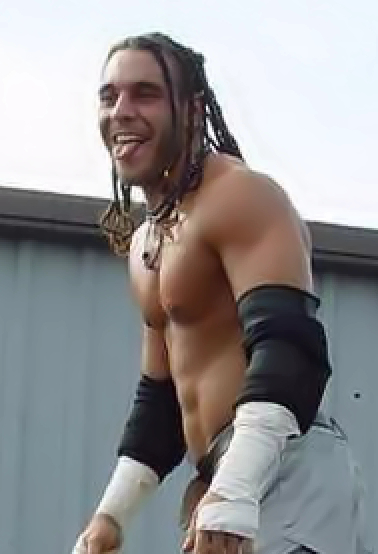
Trent Acid

Age	Ring name (Birth name)	Promotion(s) worked for	Date of birth	Date of death	Cause of death
21	Taishin Nagao	AJPW	September 13, 2003	September 9, 2025	Car accident
21	Oro (Jesús Javier Hernández)	CMLL, UWA	December 24, 1971	October 26, 1993	Head injury during match
21	Jeff Peterson	Independent circuit, ECWA, MCW, IPW	August 13, 1981	November 29, 2002	Leukemia
21	Chris Von Erich (Chris Adkisson)	WCCW, USWA	September 30, 1969	September 12, 1991	Suicide by gunshot
21	Asahi (Name unknown)	Ice Ribbon, Actwres girl'Z	October 19, 2002	February 1, 2024	Car crash
22	Rey Celestial (Oscar Leonardo Flores Parra)	AAA, CLL, Desastre Total Ultraviolento	August 29, 1995	September 17, 2017	Struck in a hit and run
22	Hana Kimura	World Wonder Ring Stardom, ROH, Wrestle-1, various Japanese Promotions	September 3, 1997	May 23, 2020	Suicide by hydrogen sulfide inhalation
22	Mass Transit (Erich Kulas)	ECW, independent circuit	October 17, 1979	May 12, 2002	Complications from gastric bypass surgery
22	Mirai (Chiemi Kitagami)	AJW, K-DOJO, Atoz	November 17, 1982	September 14, 2005	Drowned in bathtub; possibly suicide
22	Spider (Daniel Quirk)	NWA New England, independent circuit, WXW, ACW	July 19, 1982	May 28, 2005	Head injury in match
23	Edouard Beaupre (Joseph Édouard Beaupré Piché)	N/A	January 9, 1881	July 3, 1904	Tuberculosis
23	Chri$ Ca$h (Christopher Bauman Jr.)	CZW	July 13, 1982	August 18, 2005	Motorcycle accident
23	Emiko Kado	JWP, ARSION	January 28, 1976	April 9, 1999	Intercerebral bleeding in match
23	Jordan Saint (Jordan Nasir St. Fort Colin)	Independent circuit	May 1, 2003	June 12, 2026	Traffic accident
23	Shane Shamrock (Brian Howser)	MCW, MEWF, IPWA	February 8, 1975	August 18, 1998	Shot by police
23	Mike Von Erich (Michael Adkisson)	WCCW, NWA, NJPW	March 2, 1964	April 12, 1987	Suicide by drug overdose
25	Matt Travis	House of Glory	Unknown	November 9, 2019	Traffic accident
25	Reid Flair (Reid Fliehr)	AJPW, WCW, NWA, SSW, Lucha Libre USA	February 26, 1988	March 29, 2013	Drug overdose
25	David Von Erich (David Adkisson)	WCCW, NWA St. Louis, NWA, AJPW	July 22, 1958	February 10, 1984	Acute enteritis
25	Chicken Finger (Charlie King)	Independent circuit	Unknown	October 3, 2026	Unknown
26	Kasavubu (Jimmy Banks)	Stampede Wrestling, WWWF, NWA, IWE	May 14, 1956	July 27, 1982	Heart attack during operation
26	Kurtis Chapman	Revolution Pro Wrestling, Progress Wrestling, GCW, various British promotions	December 19, 1997	December 29, 2023	Suicide by hanging
27	J.C. Bailey	CZW, IWA Mid-South, IWA East-Coast	August 23, 1983	August 30, 2010	Intracranial aneurysm
27	Masakazu Fukuda	WAR, NJPW	May 17, 1972	April 19, 2000	Head injury in match
27	Russ Haas (Thomas Russell Haas)	ECWA, CZW, MCW, HWA, WWF, JAPW	March 11, 1974	December 15, 2001	Heart failure
27	Louie Spicolli (Louis Mucciolo Jr.)	WWF, ECW, WCW, UWF, AAA, FMW	February 10, 1971	February 15, 1998	Drug overdose
28	Art Barr	PNW, WCW, AAA, EMLL	October 8, 1966	November 23, 1994	Heart attack caused by a drug overdose
28	Gino Hernandez (Charles Wolfe Jr.)	WCCW, SCW, Houston Wrestling, NWA, UWF Mid-South	August 14, 1957	February 2, 1986	Possible drug overdose or murder
28	Ricky Lawless (Medardo Leon Jr.)	ICW, NWF, independent circuit	December 3, 1959	November 30, 1988	Murder
29	Trent Acid (Michael Verdi)	ROH, CZW, BJPW, JCW	November 12, 1980	June 18, 2010	Drug overdose
29	Lance Cade (Lance McNaught)	WWE, HWA, OVW, MCW, FCW, AJPW	March 2, 1981	August 13, 2010	Heart attack caused by drug overdose
29	Plum Mariko (Mariko Umeda)	JWP, AJW, Japan Women's Pro-Wrestling	November 1, 1967	August 16, 1997	Head injury in match
29	Bobby Shane (Robert Schoenberger)	NWA, CWF, CCW, CSW, GCW, WCW Australia	August 25, 1945	February 20, 1975	Drowning from plane crash
29	Chris Taylor	AWA, AJPW, NWA	June 13, 1950	June 30, 1979	Cardiomyopathy
29	Clarence Whistler	N/A	February 24, 1856	November 6, 1885	Pneumonia

=== Under 40 ===
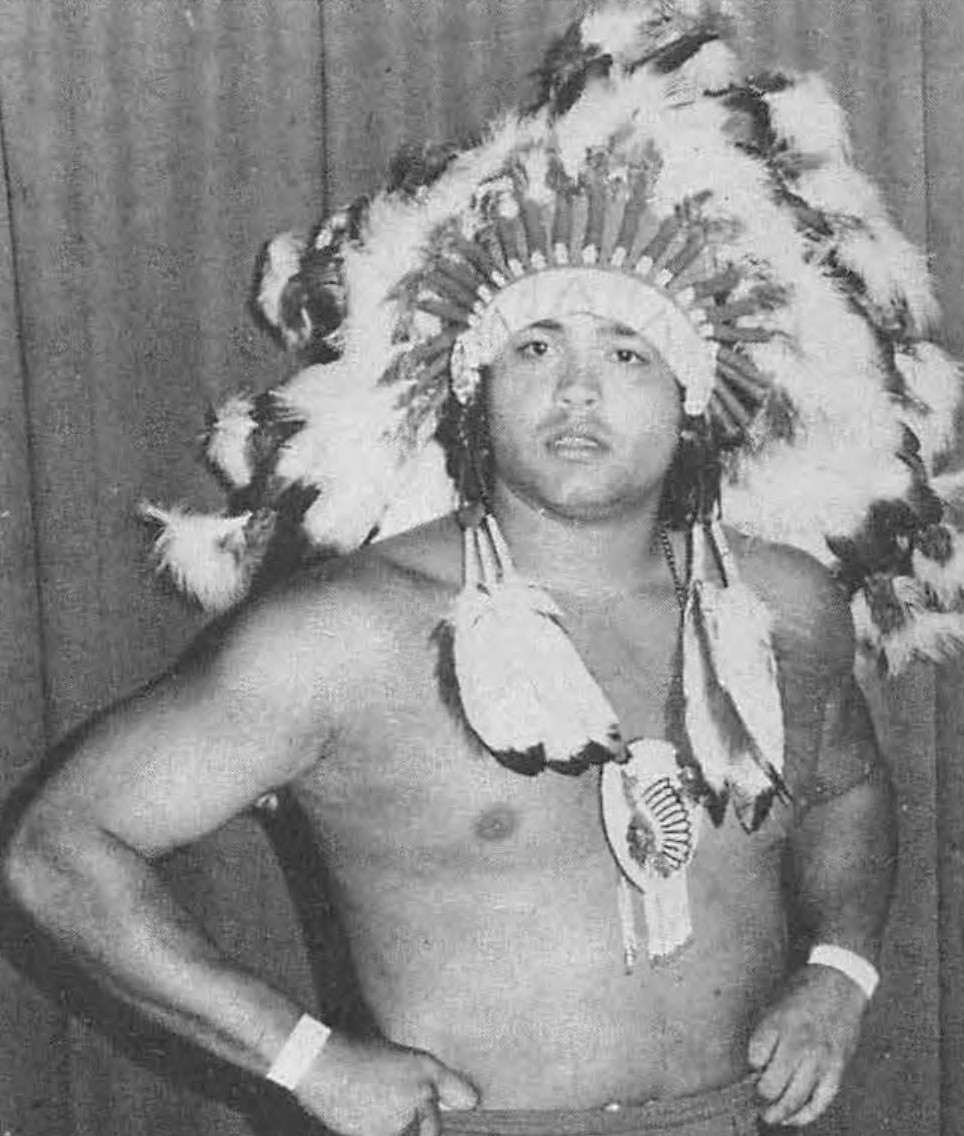
Jay Youngblood

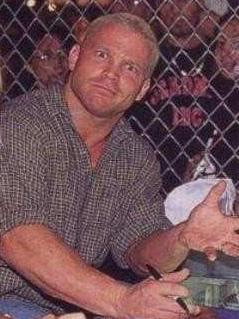
Crash Holly

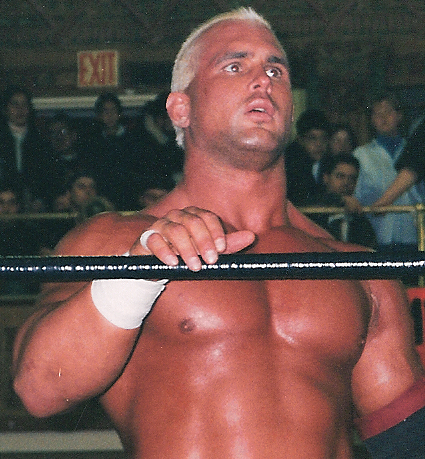
Chris Candido

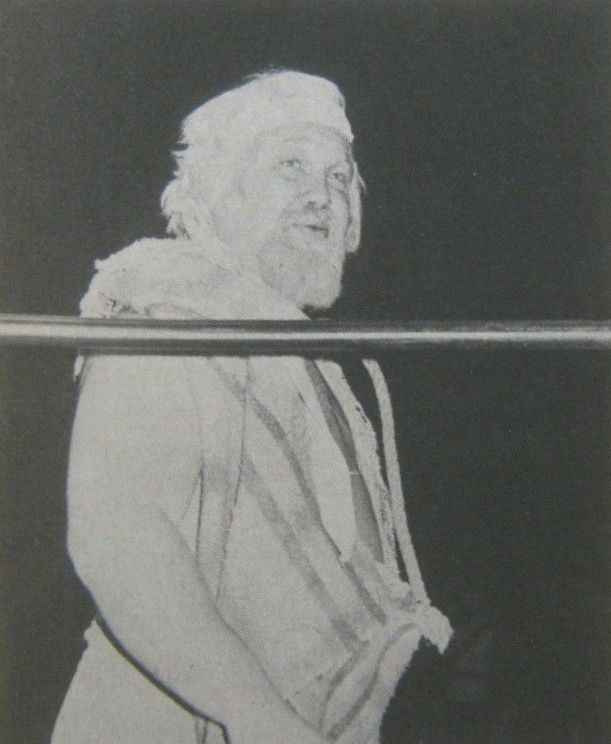
Lonnie Mayne

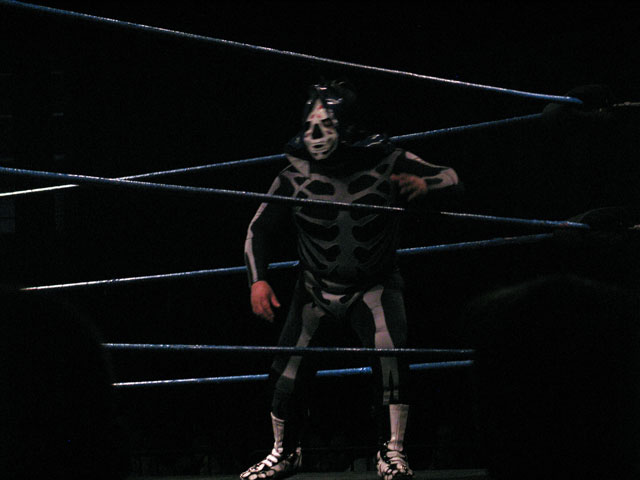
La Parkita

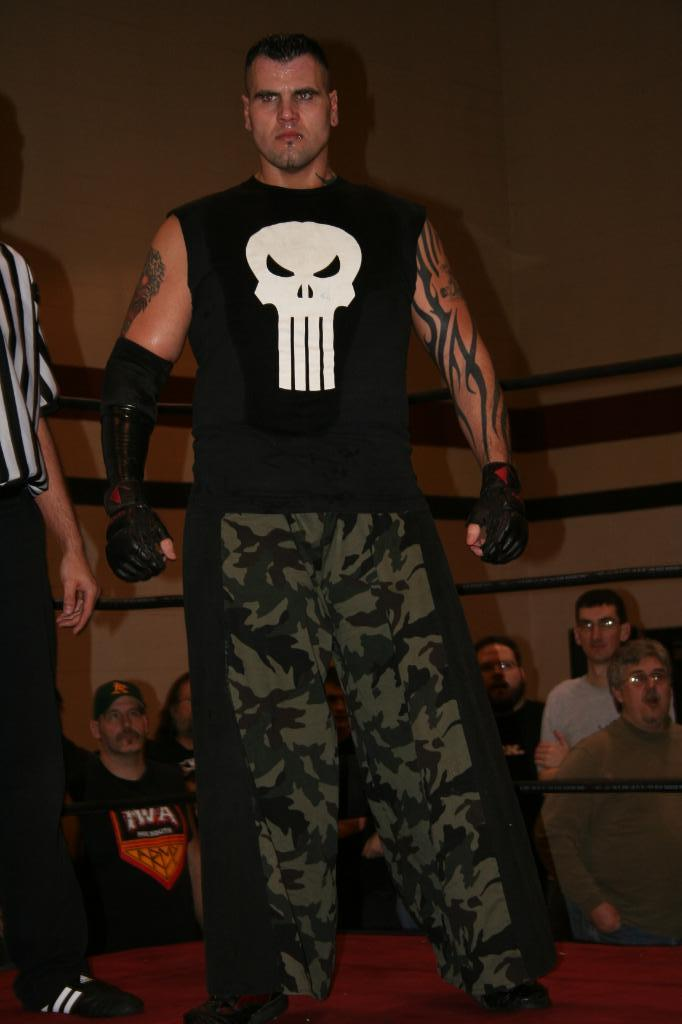
Brain Damage

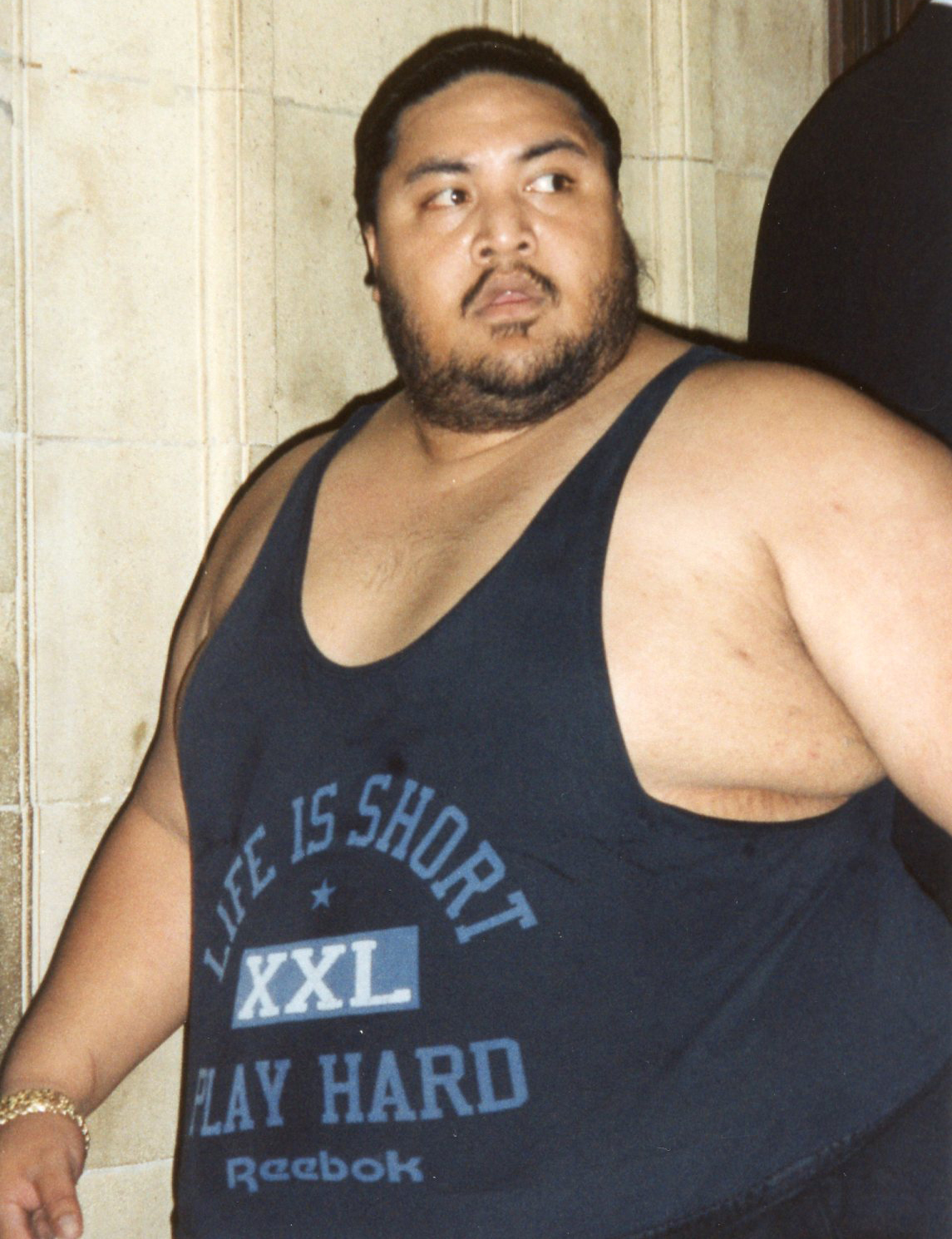
Yokozuna

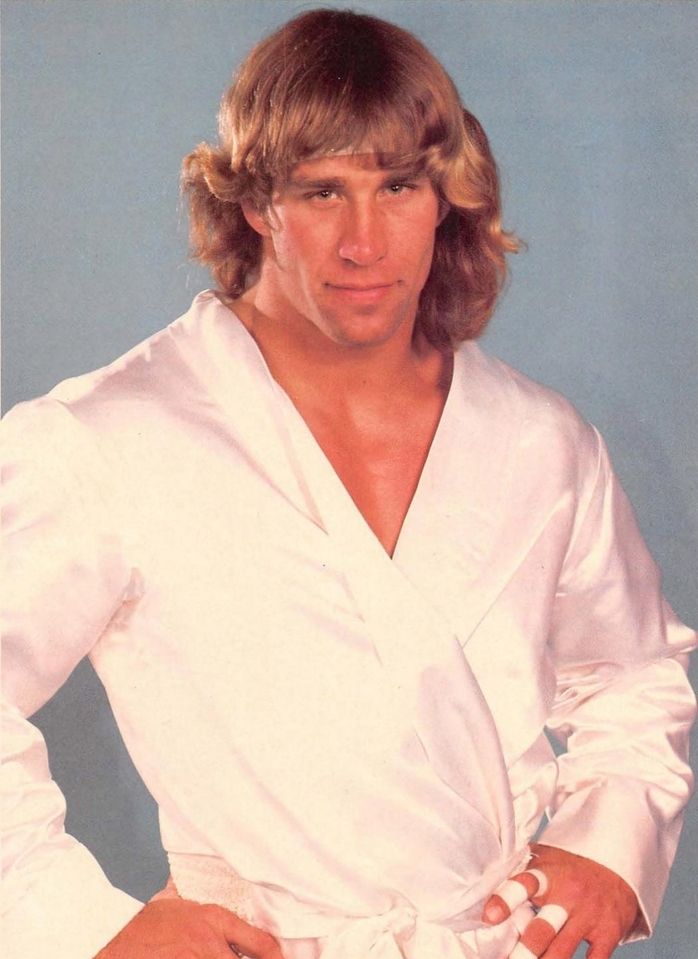
Kerry Von Erich

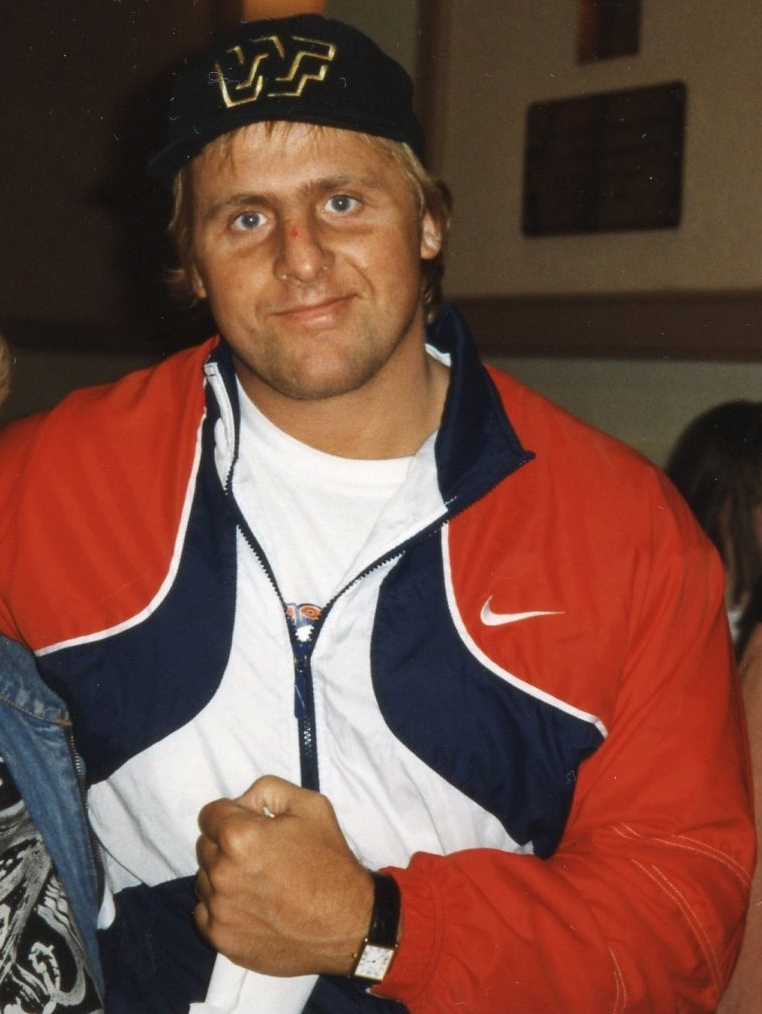
Owen Hart

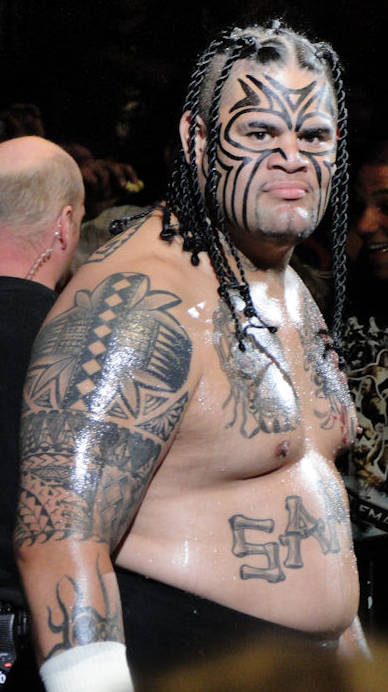
Umaga

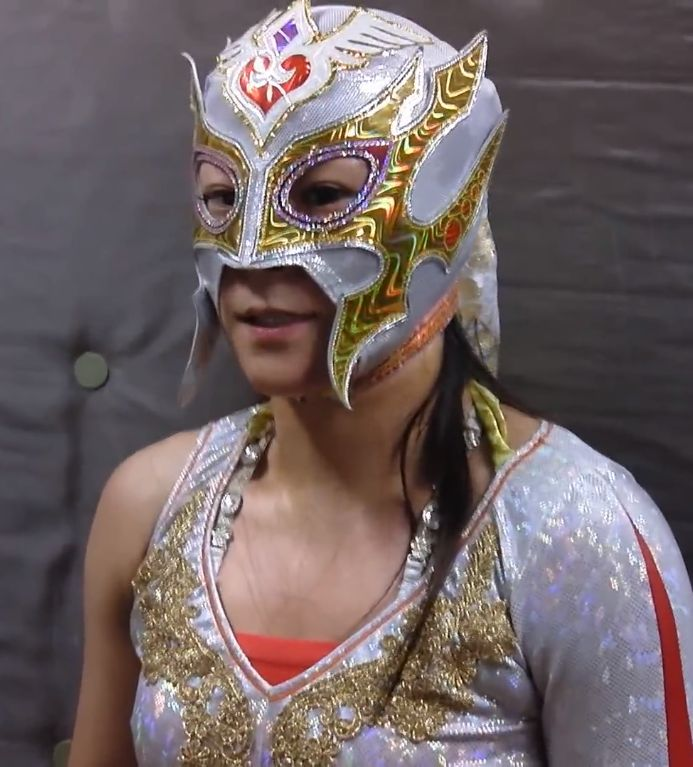
Ray

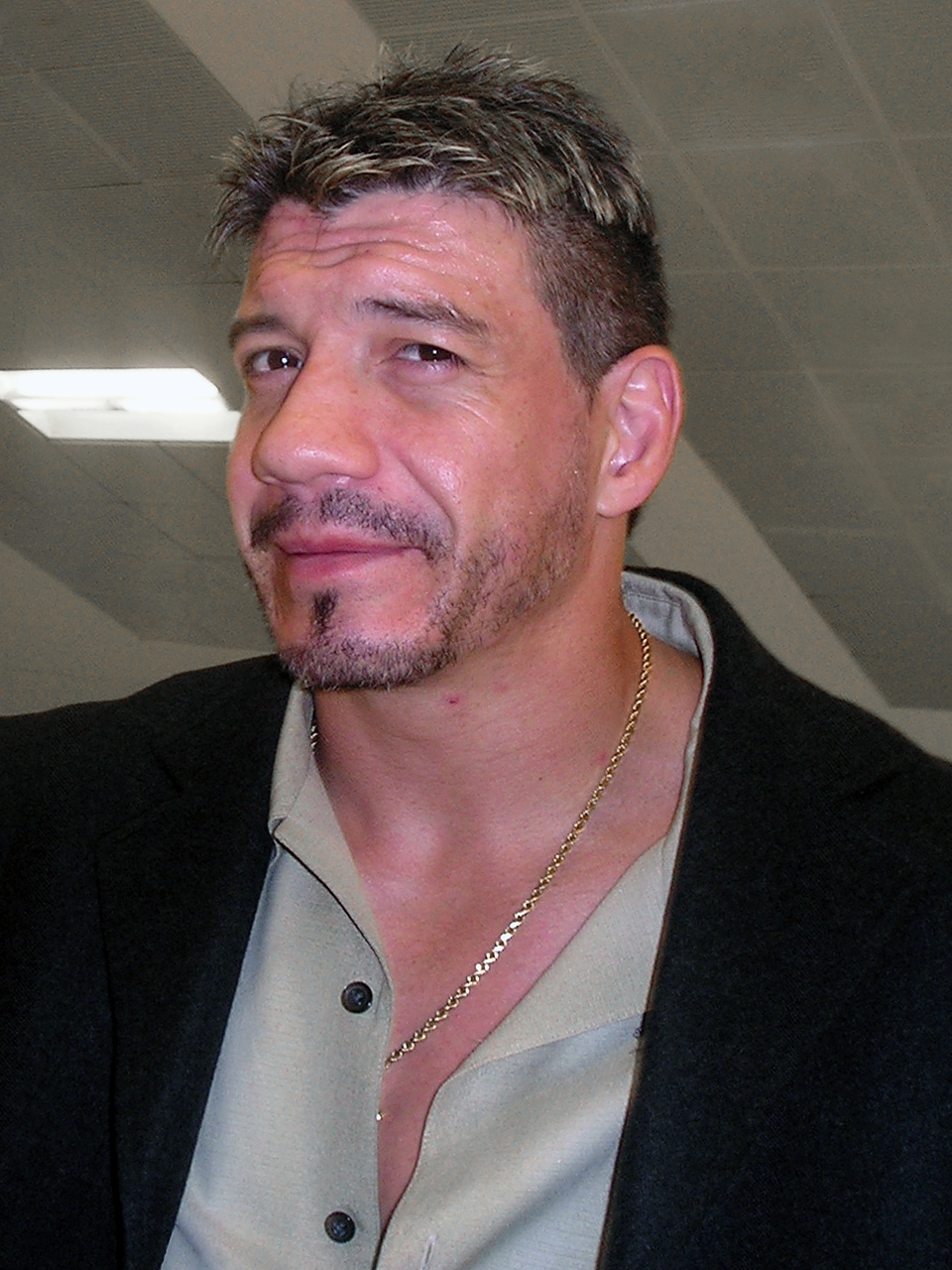
Eddie Guerrero

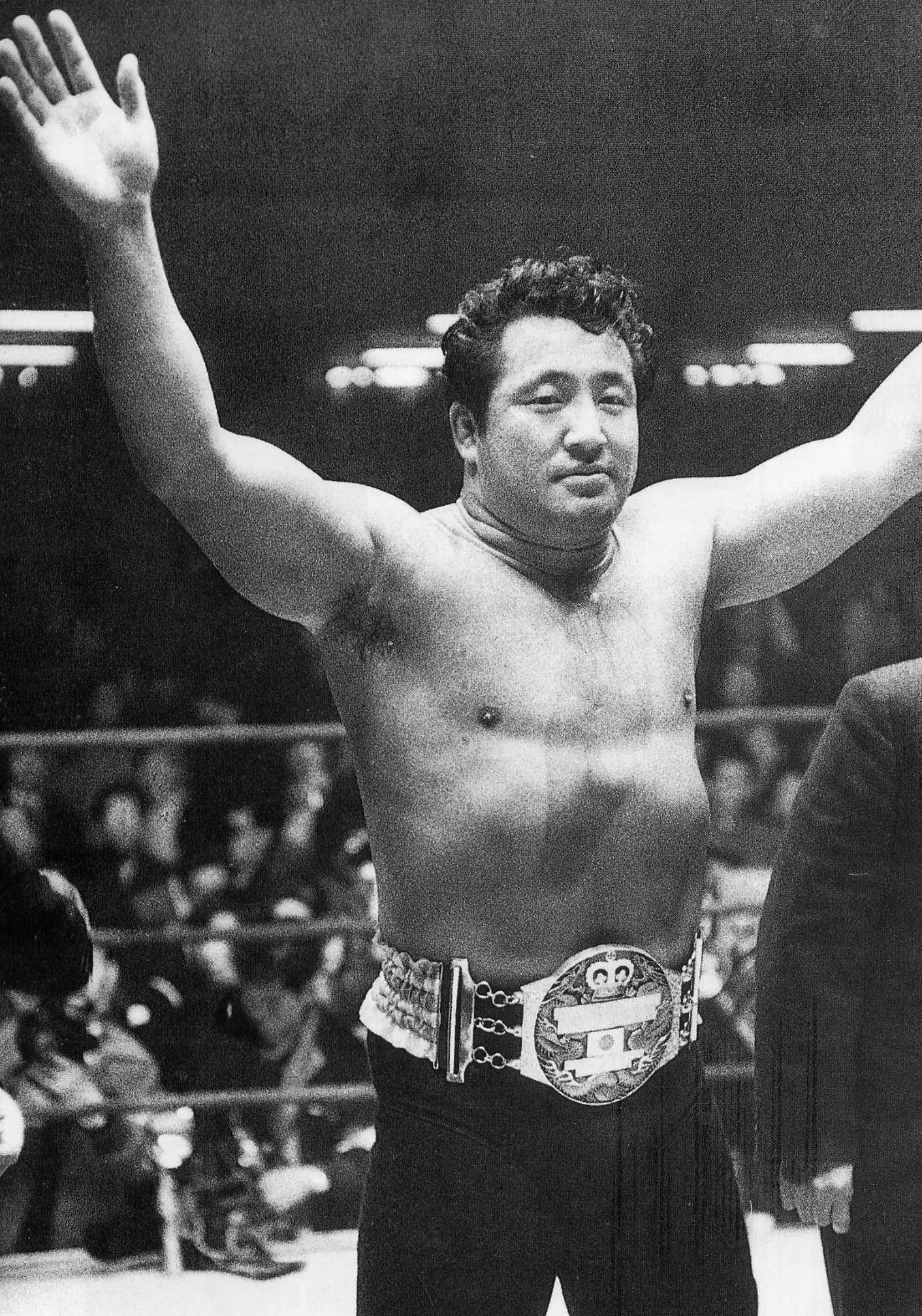
Rikidōzan

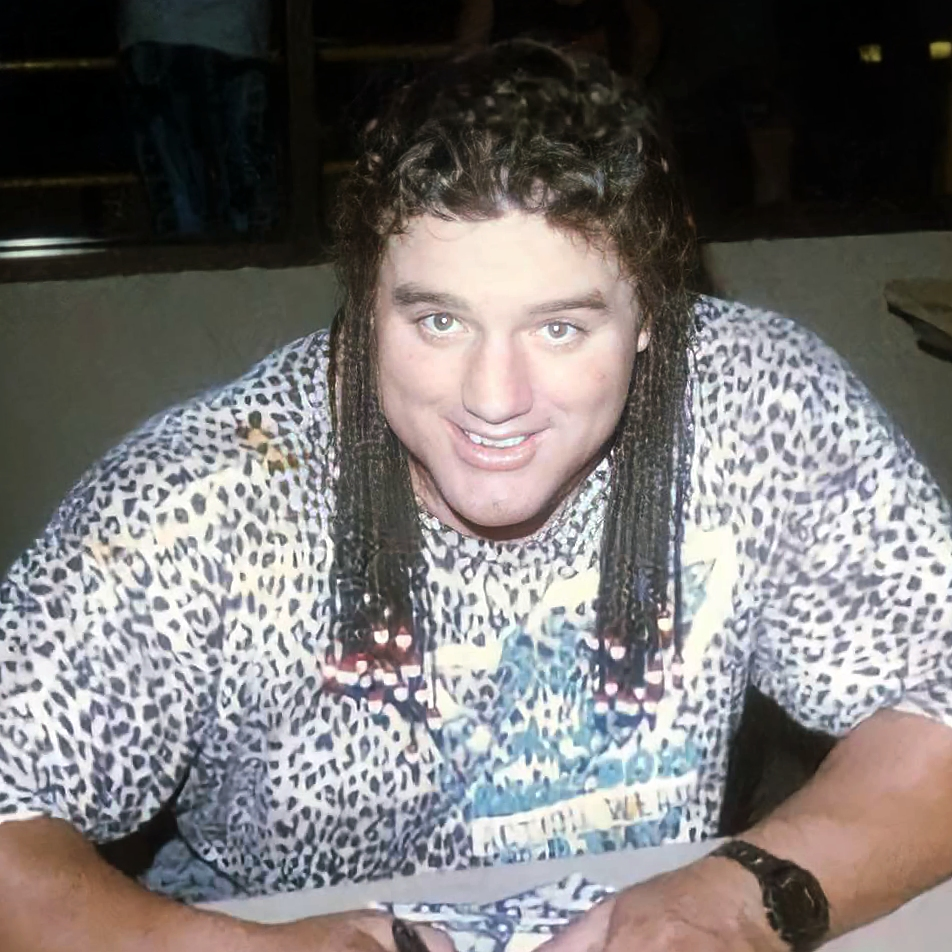
Davey Boy Smith

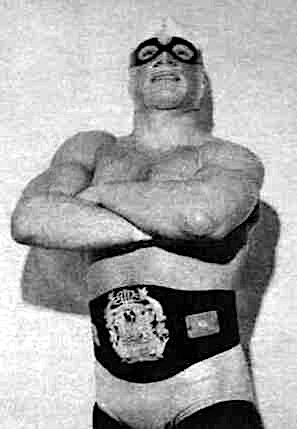
El Solitario

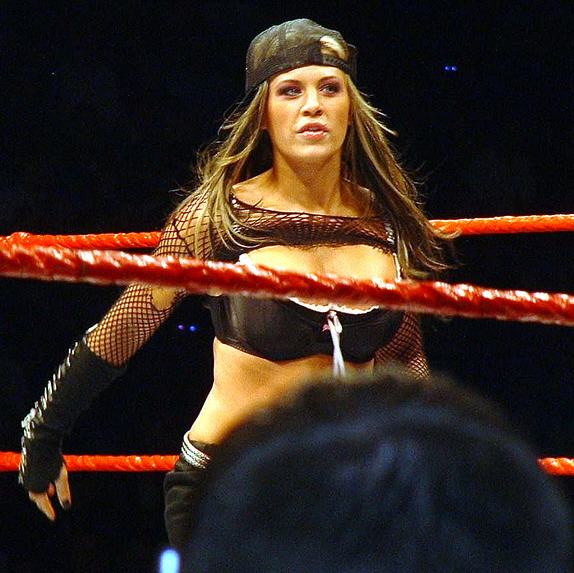
Ashley Massaro

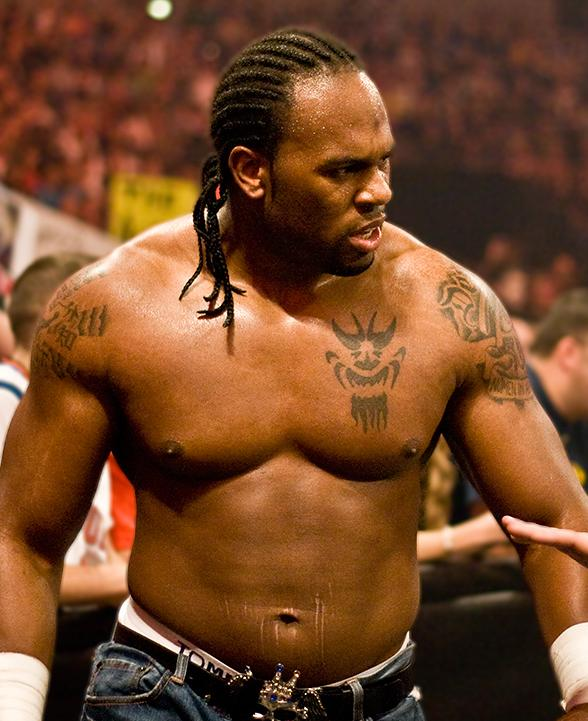
Shad Gaspard

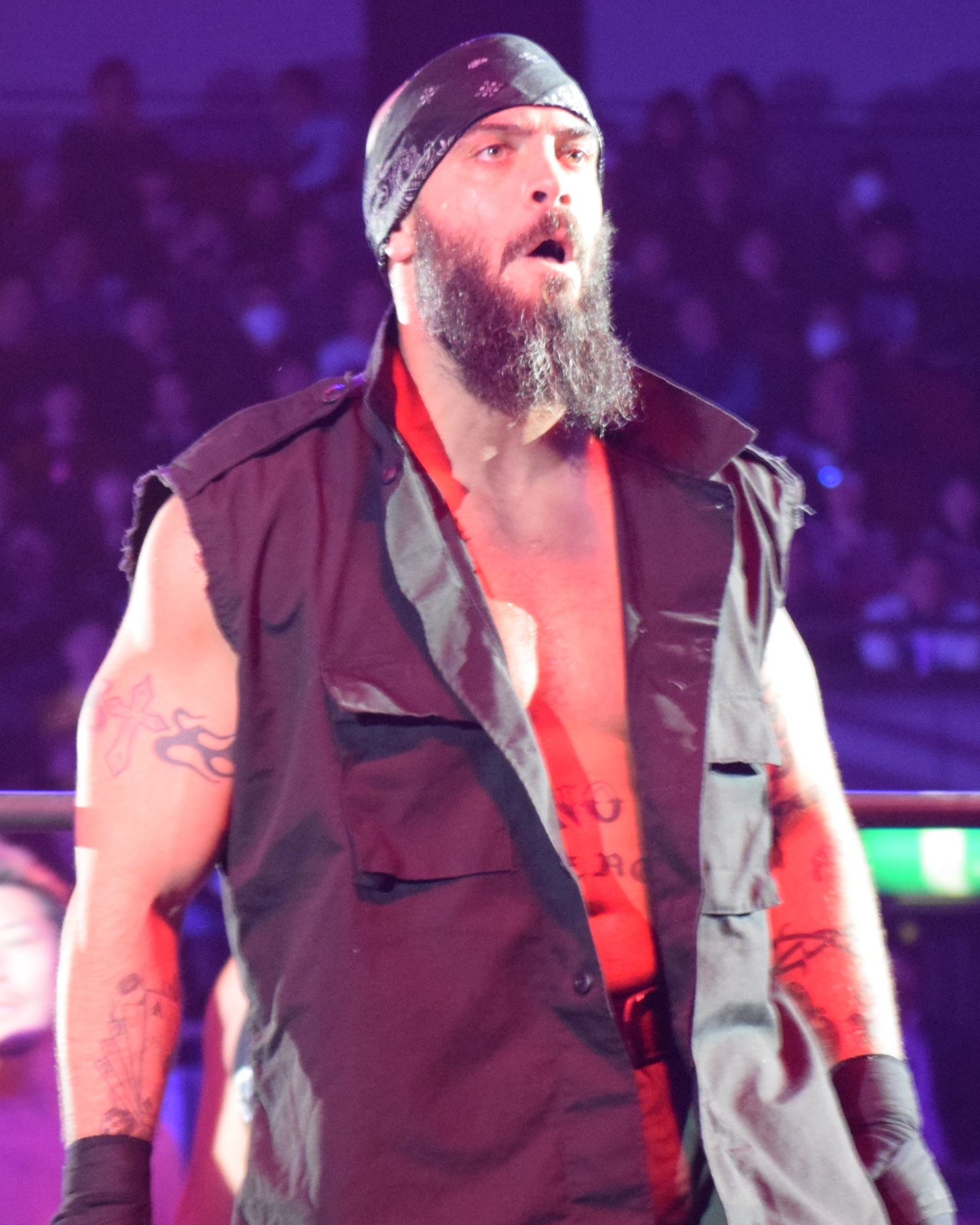
Jay Briscoe

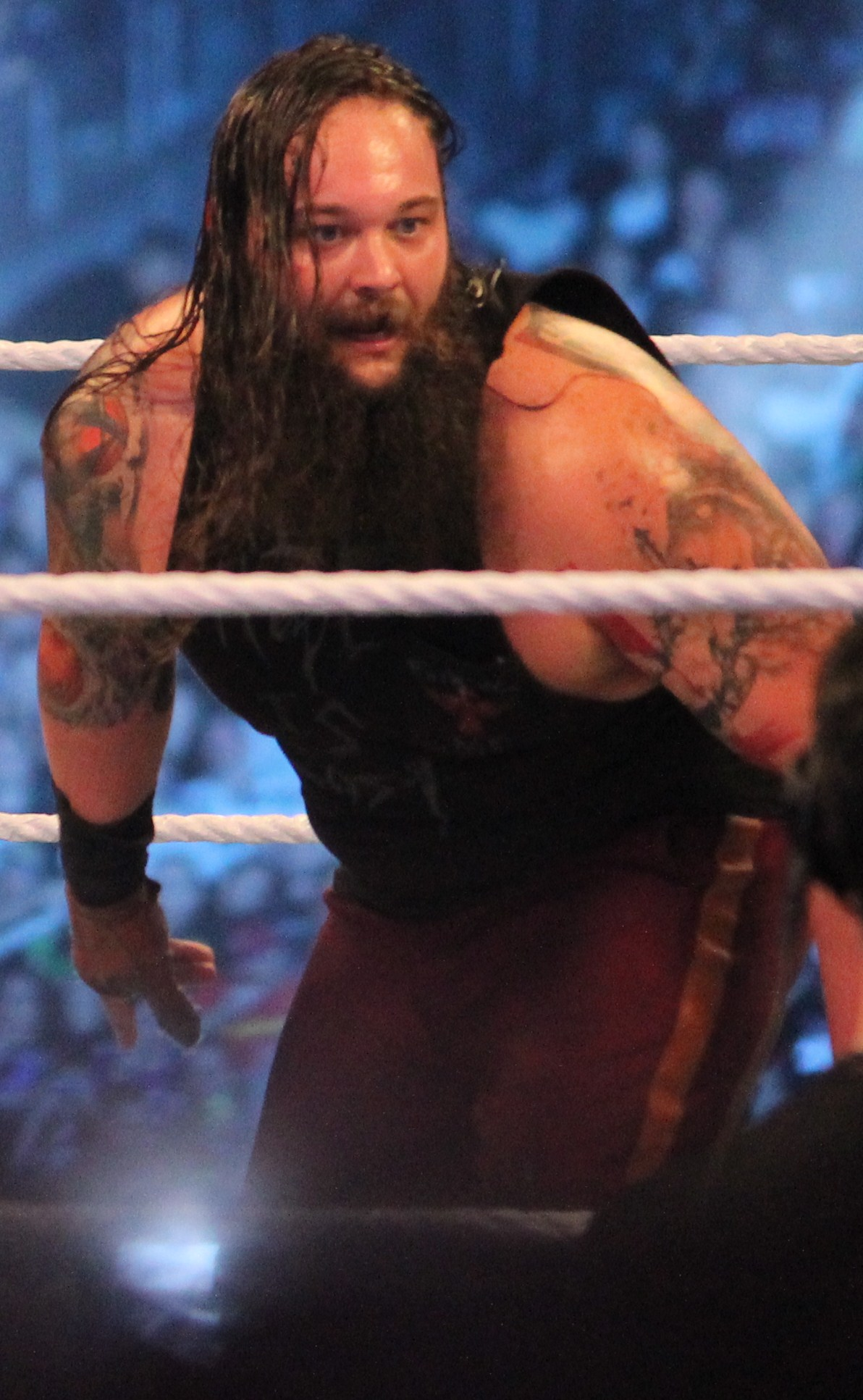
Bray Wyatt

Age	Ring name (Birth name)	Promotion(s) worked for	Date of birth	Date of death	Cause of death
30	Zubair Jhara (Muhammad Zubair Aslam)	Wrestled in Pakistan, NJPW	November 24, 1960	September 10, 1991	Heart failure
30	Sara Lee	WWE	June 7, 1992	October 5, 2022	Suicide by combined drug intoxication
30	Pierre Lefebvre	GCW, WWF, Lutte Internationale, ESA, NWA, UWF	February 24, 1955	December 24, 1985	Car crash
30	Rick McGraw	WWF, NWA, Lutte Internationale, MACW, GCW, SCW, WWA	March 19, 1955	November 1, 1985	Heart attack
30	Giant Ochiai (Takayuki Okada)	Battlarts, WJ	May 8, 1973	August 8, 2003	Subdural hematoma
30	Johnny Perry	Unknown	October 24, 1972	November 21, 2002	Heart failure
30	Larry Sweeney (Alexander Whybrow)	Chikara, IWC, ROH, CZW, IWA Mid-South, PLW	February 18, 1981	April 11, 2011	Suicide by hanging
30	Jay Youngblood (Steven Romero)	AWA, NWA, MACW, MLW, CWF, AJPW	June 21, 1955	September 2, 1985	Heart attack
31	Christin Able (Josh Burgess)	ROH, AAW Wrestling, independent circuit	January 11, 1985	April 14, 2016	Unknown
31	Ed Gantner	CWF, MACW	February 4, 1959	December 31, 1990	Suicide by gunshot
31	Gene Lipscomb	NWA, NWA San Francisco	August 9, 1931	May 10, 1963	Drug overdose
31	Scott Peterson	PNW, NWA	June 10, 1963	July 25, 1994	Motorcycle accident
31	Kazuharu Sonoda	AJPW, NWA, WSS, WCCW, CWF, MACW	September 16, 1956	November 28, 1987	Plane crash (South African Airways Flight 295)
31	Frank Speer	Unknown	May 27, 1907	June 10, 1938	Bronchial pneumonia
31	Dom Travis	various promotions in England	September 14, 1980	April 14, 2012	Suicide
31-32	Sorakichi Matsuda (Koujiro Matsuda)	N/A	1859	August 16, 1891	Tuberculosis
32	Australian Suicide (Broderick Shephard)	AEW, Lucha Libre AAA Worldwide, various promotions in Australia	December 9, 1992	March 6, 2025	Cardiac arrest preceded by non-wrestling related blunt forced trauma to the head
32	Steve Bradley (Steve Bisson)	WWF/E, PPW, OVW, NECW, HWA, WWA	December 10, 1975	December 1, 2008	Unknown
32	Jaime Cardriche	Pacific Wrestling Alliance	March 28, 1968	July 28, 2000	Complications during gallbladder surgery
32	Adam Firestorm (Adam Dykes)	ECCW, Stampede Wrestling, various promotions in Western Canada and Pacific Northwest	November 25, 1976	November 5, 2009	Suicide
32	Crash Holly (Mike Lockwood)	WWF/E, ECW, FC !Bang!, APW, TNA	August 25, 1971	November 6, 2003	Suicide by drug overdose and alcohol poisoning
32	Billy McCrary	NWA, NJPW	December 7, 1946	July 14, 1979	Motorcycle accident
32	Buzz Sawyer (Bruce Woyan)	NWA, WWF, UWF, WCCW, MACW, WCW	June 14, 1959	February 7, 1992	Cocaine-induced heart attack
32	Frank Townsend	NWA, MLW, CWC, ASW, JWA, Joint Promotions	March 20, 1933	May 15, 1965	Drowning in boating accident; considered a missing person
32	Kris Travis	TNA, RPW, PCW, ICW, PROGRESS	December 16, 1983	March 31, 2016	Stomach cancer
33	Karsten Beck (Karsten Pitann)	WXW, BJPW, CZW, various European promotions	November 25, 1986	October 15, 2020	Brain cancer
33	Jim Browning	N/A	March 31, 1903	June 25, 1936	Pulmonary embolism
33	Chris Candido	WCW, WWF, ECW, SMW, NJPW, TNA	March 21, 1972	April 28, 2005	Acute pneumonia
33	Eddie Gilbert	NWA, WCW, UWF, WWF, USWA, ECW	August 14, 1961	February 18, 1995	Heart attack
33	Paul E. Normous (Paul Fauchs)	OVW, ECWA, independent circuit	April 15, 1975	January 16, 2009	Drug overdose
33	Michel Martel (Michel Vigneault)	Stampede Wrestling, WWC, IWE, NWA	October 4, 1944	June 30, 1978	Heart attack after match
33	Moondog Mayne (Ronald Mayne)	NWA, WWWF, PNW	September 12, 1944	August 13, 1978	Car crash
33	Gran Naniwa (Yoshikuni Kimura)	Michinoku Pro, AJPW, ECW, WAR, NJPW	February 15, 1977	October 6, 2010	Heart attack
33	José Aarón Alvarado Nieves	CMLL, UWA	May 9, 1966	October 27, 1999	Infection
33	D.J. Peterson	AWA, WWF, UWF, NWA, NJPW, CSW	July 17, 1959	May 25, 1993	Motorcycle accident
33	The Renegade (Rick Wilson)	WCW, WAR	October 16, 1965	February 23, 1999	Suicide by gunshot
33	Neil Superior (Neil Caricofe)	NWL, IWCCW; SAPW, WCW	April 6, 1963	August 23, 1996	Confrontation with police
33	Test (Andrew Martin)	WWF/E, FC !Bang!, WWA, TNA	March 17, 1975	March 13, 2009	Accidental overdose of Oxycodone
33	Kerry Von Erich (Kerry Adkisson)	WCCW, NWA, UWF, USWA, WWF	February 3, 1960	February 18, 1993	Suicide by gunshot
33–34	Damian Steele (Damien Dothard)	GCW, NWA Wildside, TCW, DSW	1975	July 22, 2009	Brain aneurysm
34	Adrian Adonis (Keith Franke)	AWA, WWF, NJPW, CWF, GCW, ASW	September 15, 1953	July 4, 1988	Car crash
34	Brain Damage (Marvin Lambert)	IWA MS, CZW	December 14, 1977	October 18, 2012	Suicide
34	Big Dick Dudley (Alex Rizzo)	ECW, WWC, WWA, XPW	January 12, 1968	May 16, 2002	Kidney failure
34	Bobby Duncum Jr.	WCW, ECW, GWF, AJPW	August 26, 1965	January 24, 2000	Accidental prescription drug overdose
34	Espectrito II (Alejandro Pérez Jiménez)	AAA, WWF	May 15, 1975	June 30, 2009	Murder by poisoning
34	Owen Hart	WWF, Stampede Wrestling, NJPW, CWA	May 7, 1965	May 23, 1999	Fell from ceiling during botched stunt at Over the Edge pay-per-view event.
34	Danny Havoc (Grant Berkland)	CZW, GCW, WXW, ICW, BJPW, IWA Mid-South	May 19, 1986	May 31, 2020	Heart failure
34	El Hijo de Cien Caras (Eustacio "Tacho" Jiménez Ibarra)	AAA, CMLL	March 21, 1976	November 29, 2010	Murder
34	Wayne Munn	NWA	February 9, 1896	January 9, 1931	Bright's disease
34	John Olin	N/A	March 15, 1886	October 8, 1920	Heart attack
34	La Parkita (Alberto Pérez Jiménez)	AAA, WWF	May 15, 1975	June 30, 2009	Murder by poisoning
34	Chase Tatum (William Tatum)	WCW, UPW, Innovate Wrestling	November 3, 1973	March 23, 2008	Drug overdose
34	Elias Theodorou	Superkick'D	May 31, 1988	September 11, 2022	Colon cancer and liver failure
34	Thunder (Luke Fordward)	CMLL, Okinawa Pro Wrestling and various promotions in Australia	October 7, 1981	June 30, 2016	Stomach cancer
34	Yokozuna (Rodney Anoa'i)	WWF, AWA, NJPW, UWA	October 2, 1966	October 23, 2000	Heart attack
34-35	Sean Patrick O'Brien	OVW, independent circuit	1988	March 17, 2023	Unknown
35	Perro Aguayo Jr. (Pedro Aguayo Ramírez)	AAA, CMLL, Perros del Mal	July 23, 1979	March 21, 2015	Cardiac arrest and cervical spine trauma during match
35	Harold Angus	BWA	November 10, 1904	October 30, 1940	Shooting accident
35	James Castle (Jamie Stacey)	NWA, RPW	July 11, 1988	June 15, 2024	Acute myeloid leukemia
35	Rocky Columbo (Rocco John Colombo)	NWA, Stampede Wrestling	September 22, 1928	March 5, 1964	Drug overdose
35	Chris Duffy	WWF, IWF, independent circuit	July 7, 1965	August 25, 2000	Brain aneurysm
35	Dino Casanova (David DiMeglio)	WCW, ECW, independent circuit, MEWF	February 8, 1967	March 1, 2002	Heart attack
35	Miguel Ángel Delgado	EMLL	August 28, 1947	February 7, 1983	Leukemia
35	Scott Irwin	WWWF, UWF, CWF, AWA, Lutte Internationale	May 14, 1952	September 5, 1987	Brain tumor, also reported as brain aneurysm
35	Andy Kaufman	CWA	January 17, 1949	May 16, 1984	Kidney failure from lung cancer
35	Marianna Komlos	WWF	September 3, 1969	September 26, 2004	Breast cancer
35	Mike Lozansky (Michael Lozanski)	ECW, USWA, WWC, Stampede Wrestling, various Mexican and Japanese promotions	November 13, 1968	December 19, 2003	Heart attack
35	Brian Pillman	Stampede, WCW, ECW, WWF	May 22, 1962	October 5, 1997	Arteriosclerotic heart disease
36	Gary Albright	Stampede, UWFi, AJPW, ECW	May 18, 1963	January 7, 2000	Heart attack in match
36	Shoichi Arai	FMW promoter	December 19, 1965	May 16, 2002	Suicide by hanging
36	Bobby Becker (John Emerling)	NWA	April 5, 1918	November 25, 1954	Leukemia
36	Harry Boatswain	ECW	June 26, 1969	August 8, 2005	Heart attack
36	Lloyd Burdick	Unknown	August 8, 1909	August 9, 1945	Train wreck
36	Sean Evans	PWX, NWA Wildside, GCW, WWE, NWA, independent circuit	January 28, 1971	October 2, 2007	Lung cancer
36	Emory Hale (Emory Hail)	WCW, XWF	December 13, 1969	January 28, 2006	Kidney failure
36	Dean Hart	Stampede, NWA Hawaii, WSS	January 3, 1954	November 21, 1990	Heart Attack caused by kidney disease.
36	Katsuya Kitamura	NJPW	December 14, 1985	October 13, 2022	Unknown
36	Lionheart (Adrian McCallum)	ICW, PCW	December 17, 1982	June 19, 2019	Suicide
36	Pitbull #2 (Anthony Durante)	ECW, CWA, NJPW, JAPW	July 26, 1967	September 25, 2003	Drug overdose
36	Buford Pusser	UWF Mid-South	December 12, 1937	August 21, 1974	Car crash
36	Ray (Name unknown)	Smash, WNC, Shimmer, Ice Ribbon, JWP	February 14, 1982	August 30, 2018	Brain tumor
36	Freddie Sweetan (Fred Prossner)	NWA, Stampede Wrestling, CSW, MACW	July 25, 1938	July 26, 1974	House fire
36	Jerry Tuite (Michael Jerome Tuite)	WCW, ECW, TNA, PCW, AJPW	December 27, 1966	December 6, 2003	Heart attack
36	Umaga (Edward Fatu)	WWE, TNA, HWA, WXW, AJPW	March 28, 1973	December 4, 2009	Heart attack caused by combined drug intoxication
36	Bray Wyatt (Windham Rotunda)	WWE, FCW	May 23, 1987	August 24, 2023	Heart attack resulting from COVID-19 complications
37	Abismo Negro (Andrés Alejandro Palomeque González)	AAA, CMLL, WWF, TNA	July 1, 1971	March 22, 2009	Drowning
37	Mike Bell	WWF, ECW, UPW	March 18, 1971	December 14, 2008	Heart attack from drug overdose
37	Leroy Brown (Roland C. Daniels)	NWA, CWF, NJPW, UWF	November 30, 1950	September 6, 1988	Heart attack
37	Whitey Caldwell	NWA Mid-America, NWA Gulf Coast	July 2, 1935	October 7, 1972	Car crash
37	Brian Hildebrand	SMW, ECW, referee for WCW	January 5, 1962	September 8, 1999	Stomach and bowel cancer
37	Sam McVey (Samuel MacVea)	Wrestled in Australia	May 17, 1884	December 23, 1921	Pneumonia
37	Jaysin Strife (Nathan Blodgett)	NWA, IWA Mid-South, independent circuit	August 14, 1985	December 29, 2022	Illness
37	Alberto Torres	NWA, AWA, GCW, NWA Tri-State	January 2, 1934	June 16, 1971	Ruptured pancreas (from a heart attack and other internal injuries)
37	Randolph Turpin	N/A	June 7, 1928	May 17, 1966	Shot; unknown if murder or suicide
37–38	Espanto I (José Eusebio Vázquez Bernal)	EMLL	1930	May 30, 1968	Beaten
38	Aleksander Aberg	N/A	August 11, 1881	February 20, 1920	Pneumonia
38	Tim Arson (Timothy Calkins)	WWE, WWC, independent circuit	December 27, 1976	January 7, 2015	Unknown
38	Jay Briscoe (Jamin Pugh)	ROH, CZW, NJPW, Impact Wrestling	January 25, 1984	January 17, 2023	Car crash
38	Matt Cappotelli	OVW, WWE	November 12, 1979	June 29, 2018	Brain cancer
38	Brian Danovich	Contestant for WWE Tough Enough, DSW, independent circuit	July 8, 1980	August 9, 2018	Suicide
38	Chip Fairway (Brett Keen)	HWA, IWA Mid-South	November 7, 1972	April 9, 2011	Unknown
39	Johnny Grunge (Michael Durham)	ECW, WCW, WWF, 3PW, TCW	July 10, 1965	February 16, 2006	Sleep apnea complications
38	Eddie Guerrero (Eduardo Gory Guerrero Llanes)	CMLL, AAA, NJPW, ECW, WCW, WWF/E	October 9, 1967	November 13, 2005	Arteriosclerotic heart disease
38	Jim Hady (John Hady)	NWA Hawaii, NWA, AWA, WWWF, MLW	May 30, 1930	January 13, 1969	Heart attack (during match)
38	John Kronus (George Caiazzo)	ECW, USWA, IWF, CZW, WAR, XPW	January 13, 1969	July 18, 2007	Heart failure
38	Danno O'Mahony (Daniel O'Mahony)	NWA	September 29, 1912	November 5, 1950	Car crash
38	Chabela Romero (Isabela Romero Rangel)	AJW, CMLL, UWA	November 11, 1946	April 19, 1985	Unknown
38	Victor the Bodyguard (Victor Rodriguez)	IWA, WWC	August 19, 1965	June 20, 2004	Heart attack
38	Bison Smith (Mark Smith)	IWA, ROH, WWC, APW, Pro Wrestling Noah	September 24, 1973	November 22, 2011	Heart complications
38	Wolf (Daniel Wolfe)	NWA, ECW, JAPW, independent circuit	June 30, 1972	February 2, 2011	Unknown
39	BellaDonna (Roxanne "Rocksan" Biggerstaff)	TNA	April 25, 1979	January 21, 2019	Unknown
39	Jeff Cannonball (Jeffery Guerriero)	CZW, FMW, Limitless Wrestling, independent circuit	June 24, 1987	October 8, 2026	ALS
39	Jim Clintstock (Howard Clay Clinkscale)	N/A	December 29, 1904	January 29, 1944	Murder
39	Hercules Cortez (Alfonso Chicharro)	AWA, WCW Australia, NWA	July 7, 1932	July 23, 1971	Car crash
39	Fabián el Gitano (Emilio Fabián Fernández de León)	CMLL	January 24, 1972	March 17, 2011	Pancreatic hemorrhage
39	Shad Gaspard	WWE, OVW, FCW, JAPW, IGF, NWA Wildside	January 13, 1981	May 17, 2020	Drowning
39	Jaka (Jonathan Echevarria)	Evolve, GCW, FIP, BRCW, Chikara	February 1, 1986	September 7, 2025	complications from heart attack
39	George Kennedy (George Kendall)	Promoter for wrestling in Montreal	December 29, 1881	October 19, 1921	Complications from Spanish flu
39	Joey Maggs (Joseph Magliano)	WCW, WWF, SMW, USWA	September 29, 1967	October 15, 2006	Cardiac arrest
39	Ashley Massaro	WWE	May 26, 1979	May 16, 2019	Suicide by hanging
39	Médico Asesino (Cesáreo Anselmo Manríquez González )	EMLL, NWA	August 27, 1920	June 16, 1960	Cancer
39	Skull Murphy (John Murphy)	GCW, WWWF, WCW Australia, Studio Wrestling	December 7, 1930	March 23, 1970	Suicide by drug overdose
39	Jimmy Rave (James Michael Guffey)	ROH, TNA, FIP, NWA Wildside, NWA, CZW, PWG	December 8, 1982	December 12, 2021	MRSA infection
39	Rikidōzan (Kim Sin-rak)	NWA, JWA	November 14, 1924	December 15, 1963	Peritonitis (as result of stabbing)
39	Davey Boy Smith (David Smith)	Stampede Wrestling, WWF, AJPW, ECW, WCW	November 27, 1962	May 18, 2002	Heart attack
39	El Solitario (Roberto González)	UWA, EMLL	May 22, 1946	April 6, 1986	Cardiac arrest during operation
39	Pak Song (Pak Song Nam)	NWA, JWA, WSS, AJPW, CWF, WCCW	April 11, 1943	October 24, 1982	Marfan syndrome
39	Villano II (José Alfredo Díaz Mendoza)	UWA, EMLL	September 25, 1949	April 17, 1989	Suicide by hanging
39	Ed Virag	NWA, various European promotions	August 12, 1912	October 20, 1951	Car crash

=== Under 50 ===
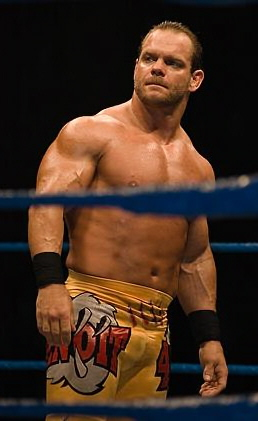
Chris Benoit

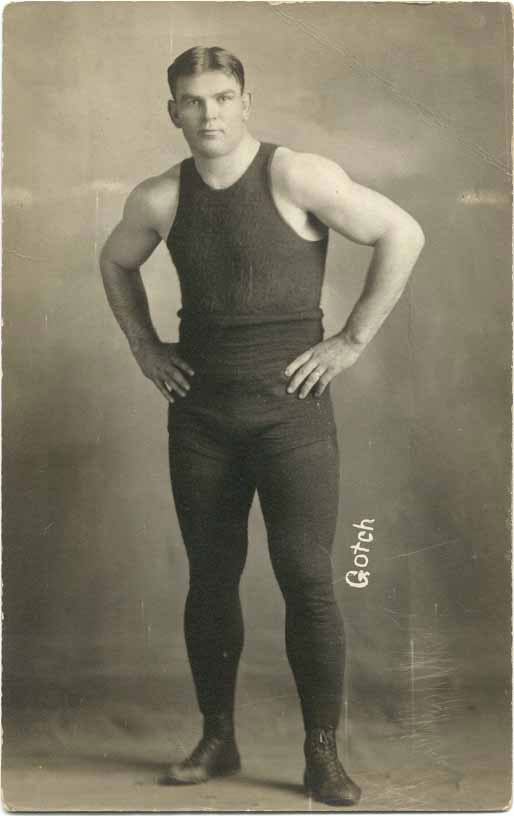
Frank Gotch

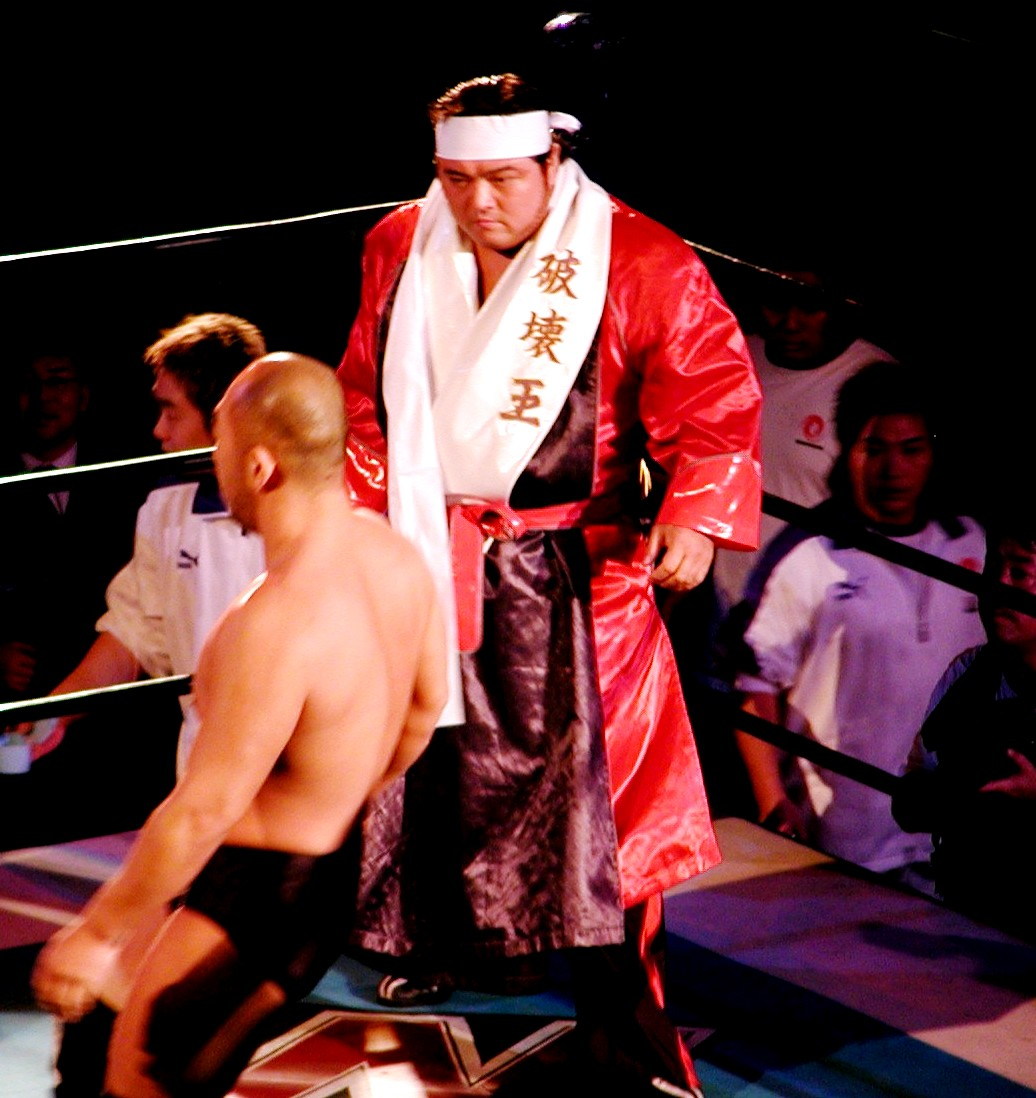
Shinya Hashimoto

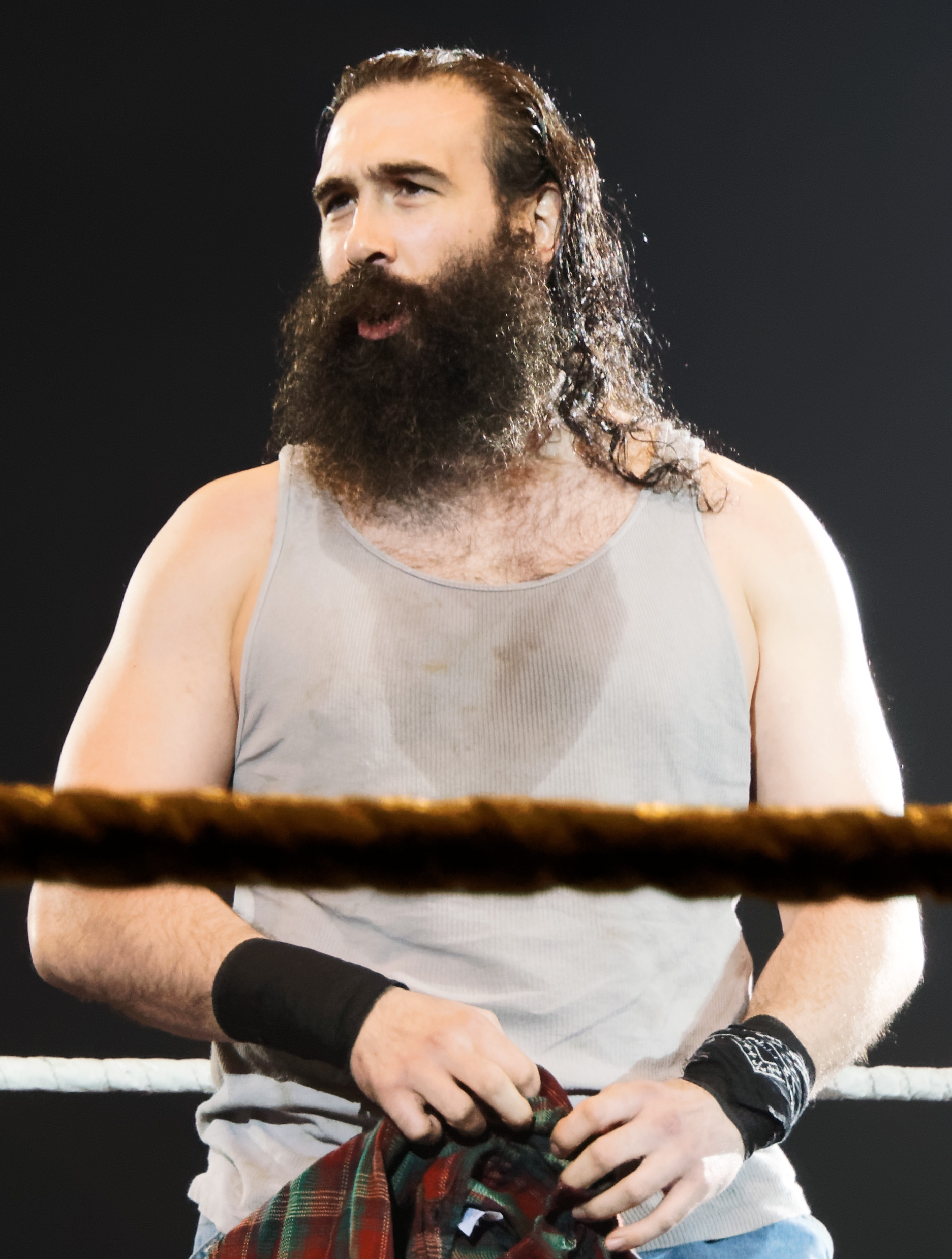
Brodie Lee

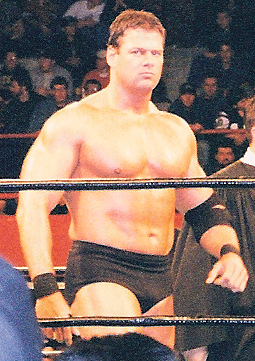
Mike Awesome

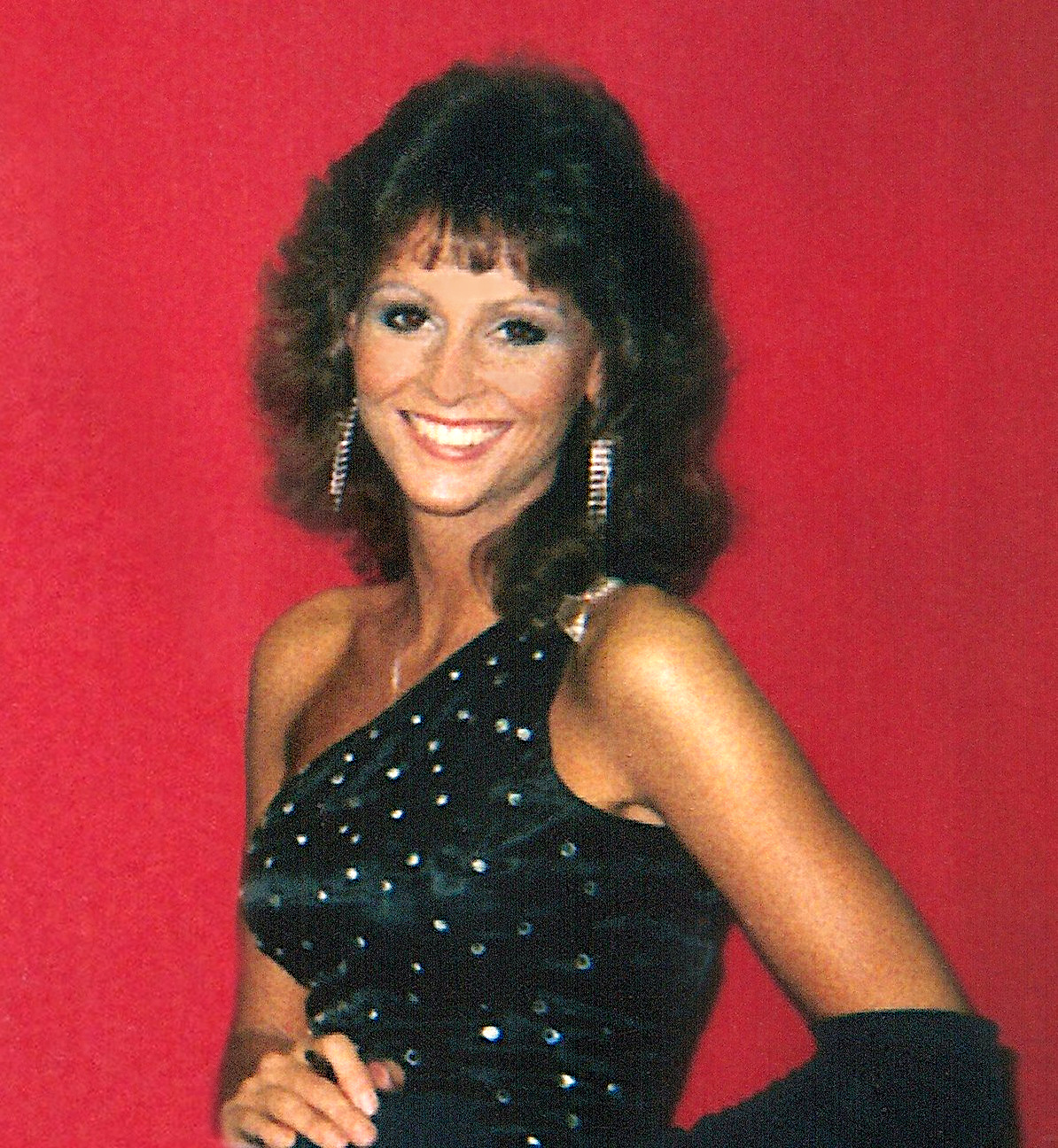
Miss Elizabeth

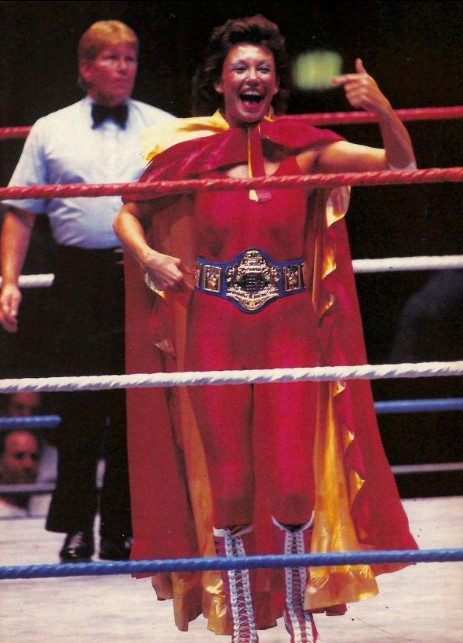
Sherri Martel

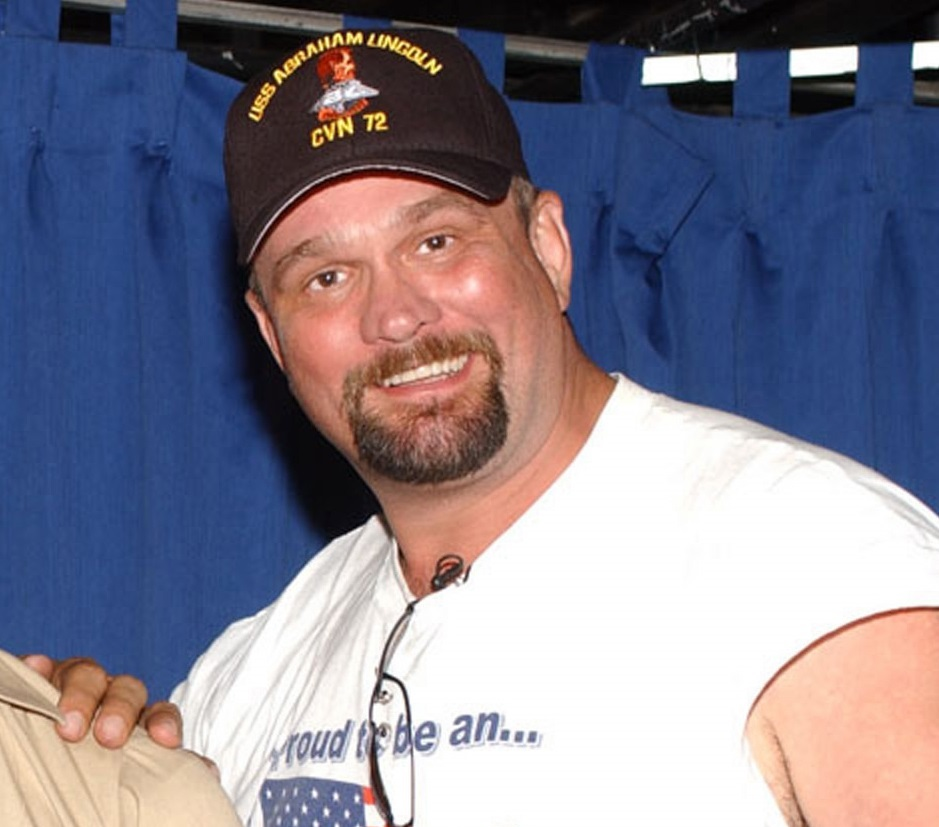
Big Boss Man

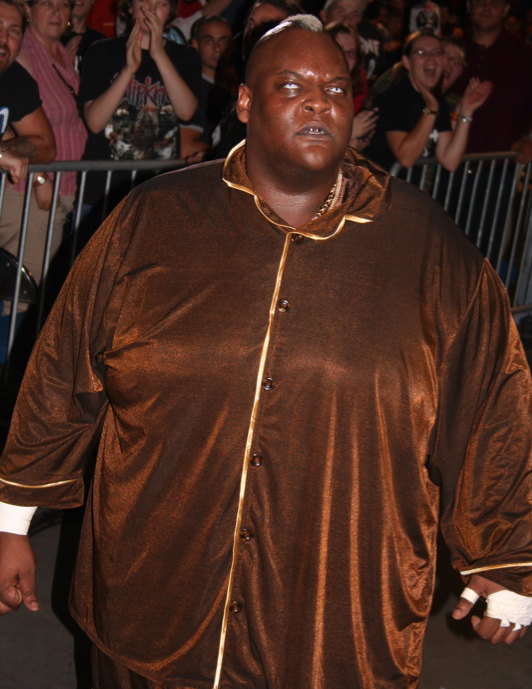
Viscera

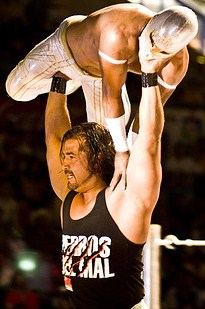
Héctor Garza

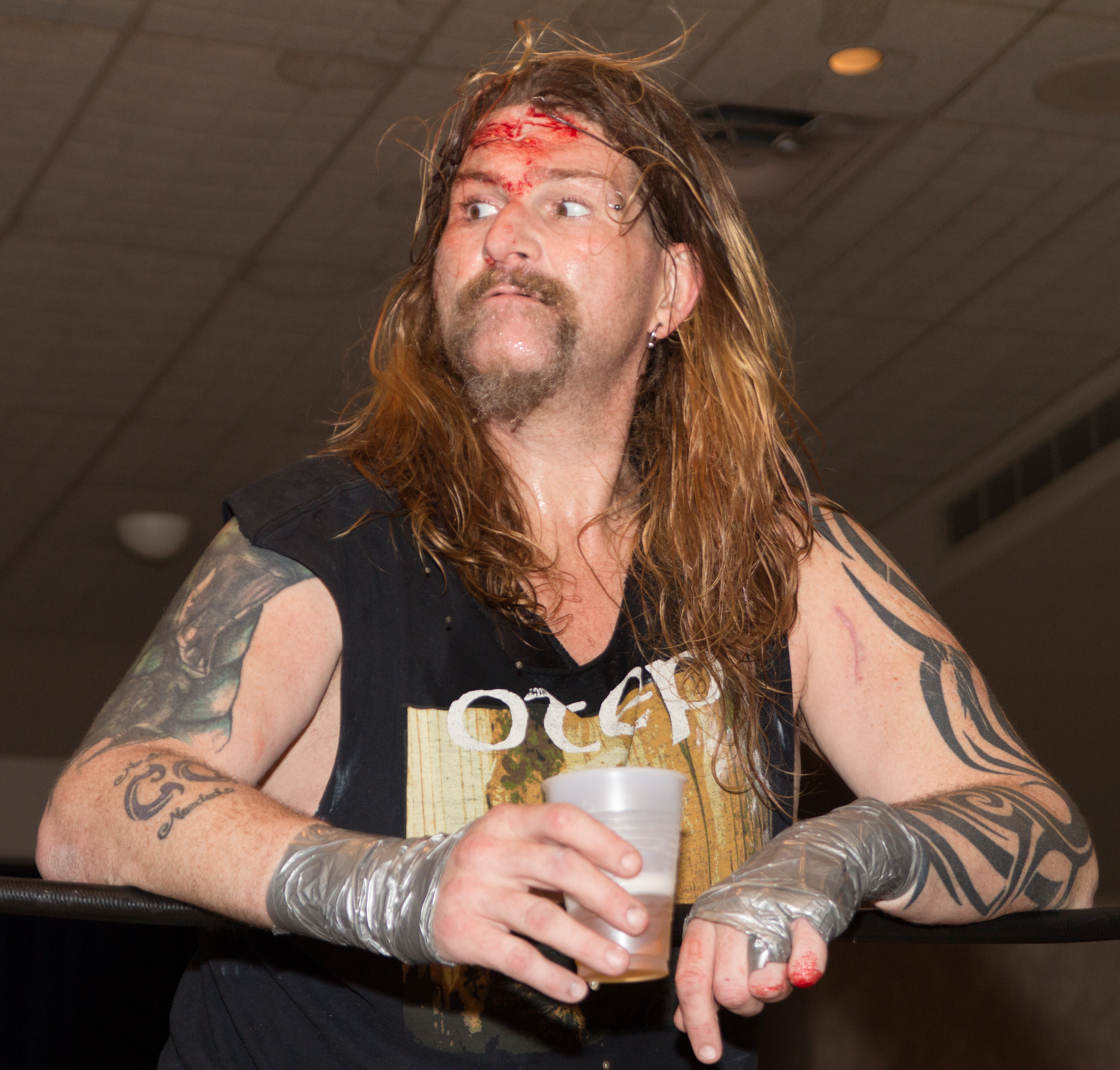
Balls Mahoney

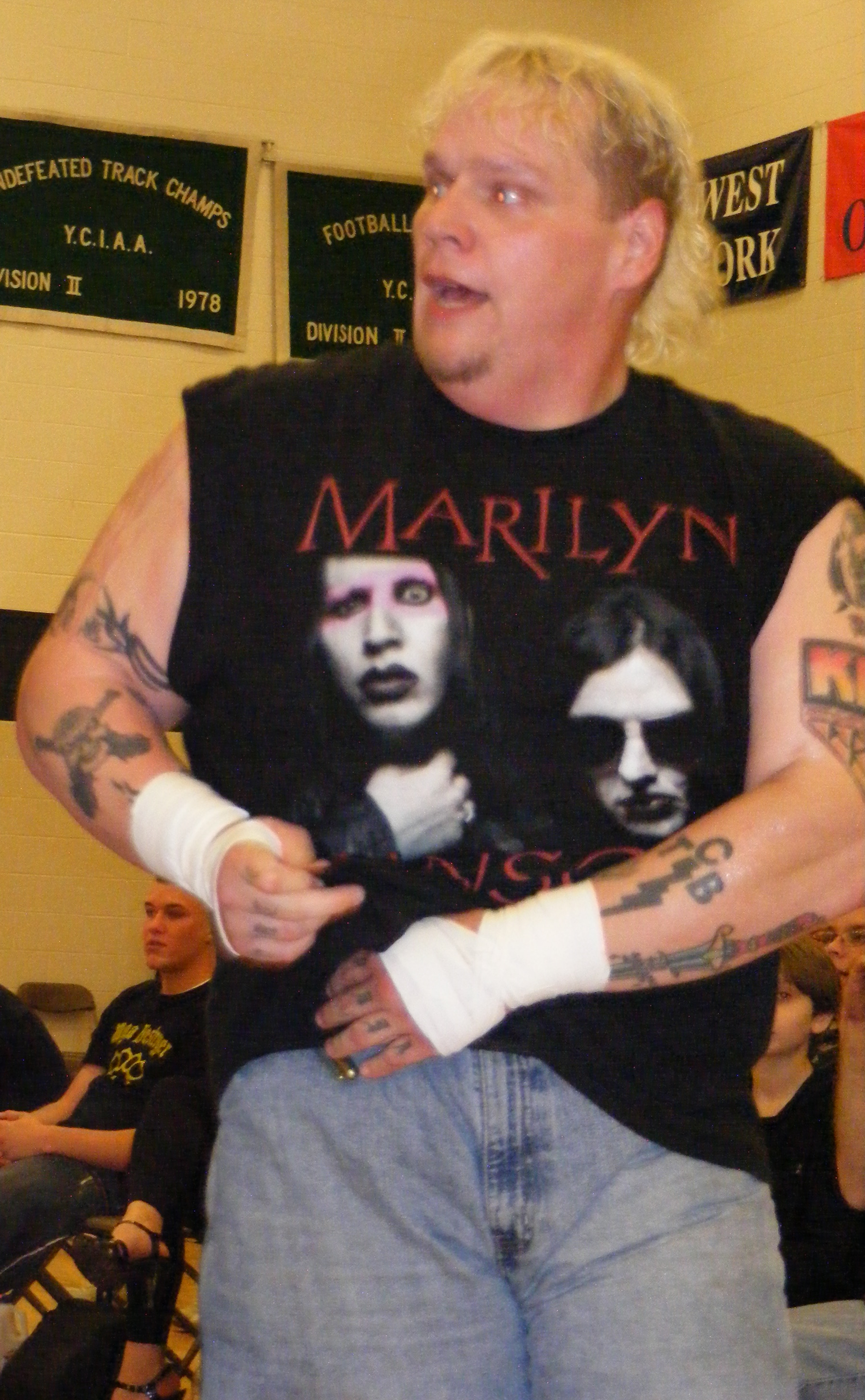
Axl Rotten

Pac

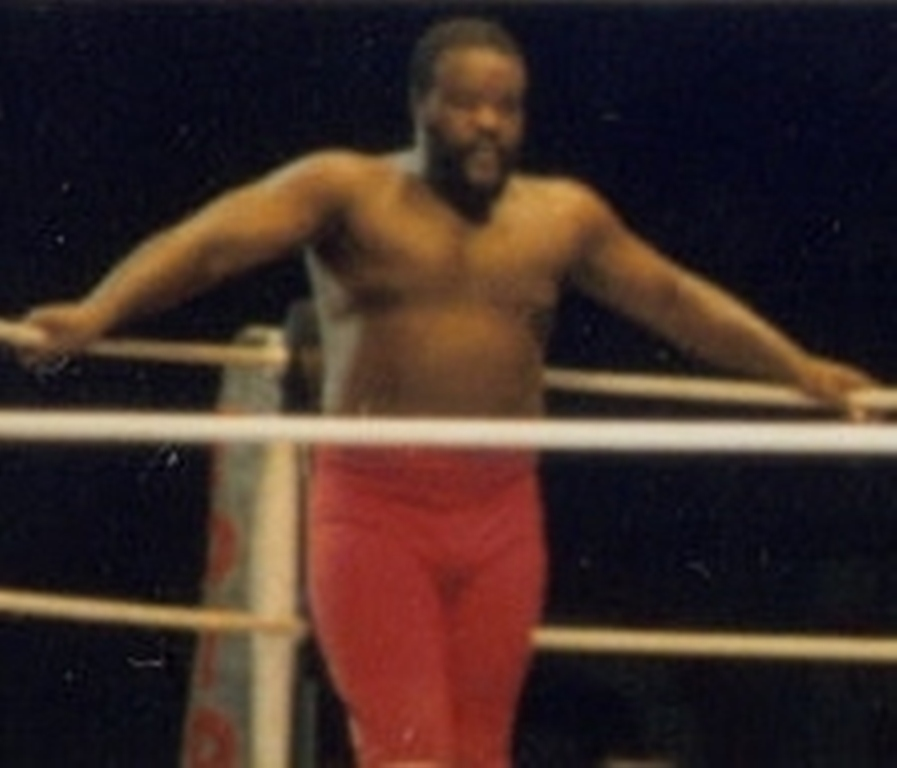
Junkyard Dog

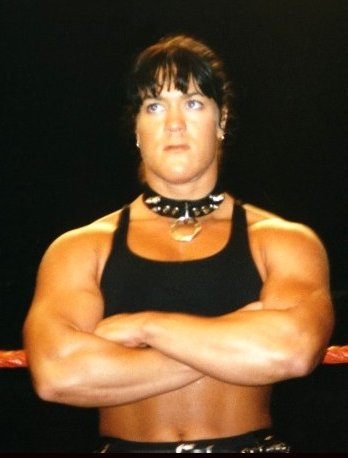
Chyna

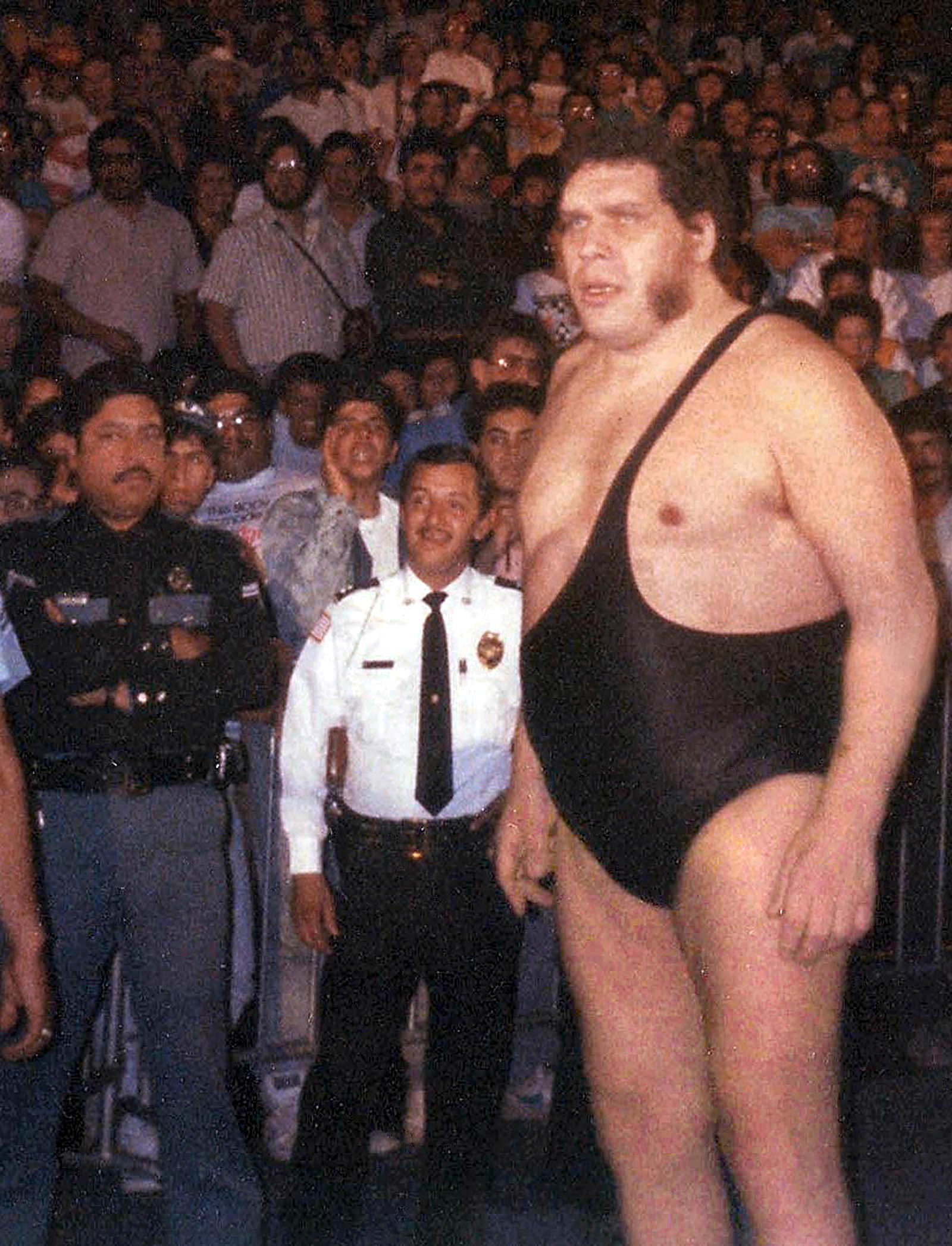
André the Giant

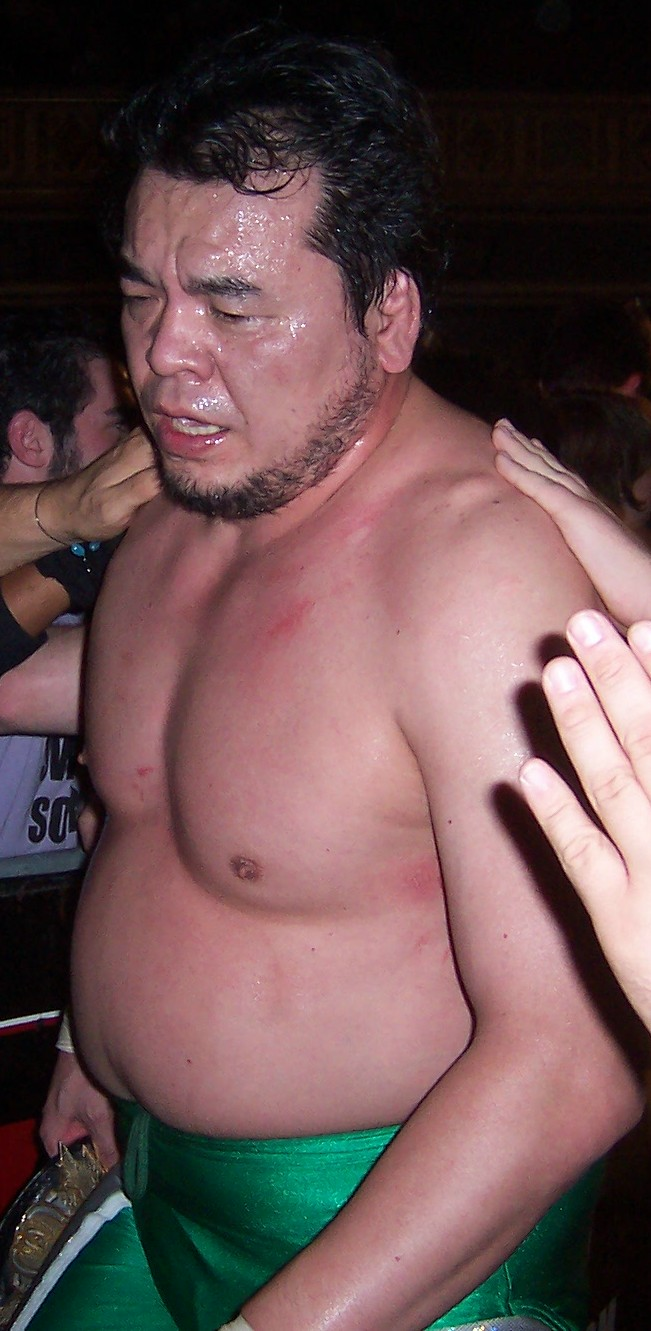
Mitsuharu Misawa

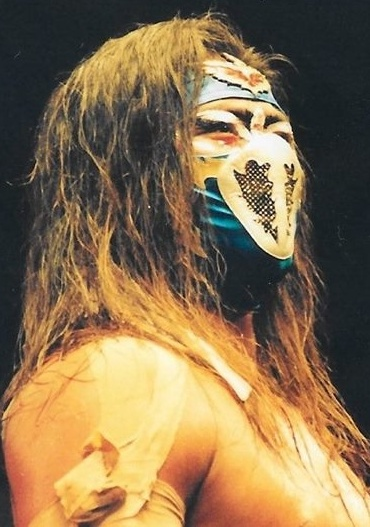
Hayabusa

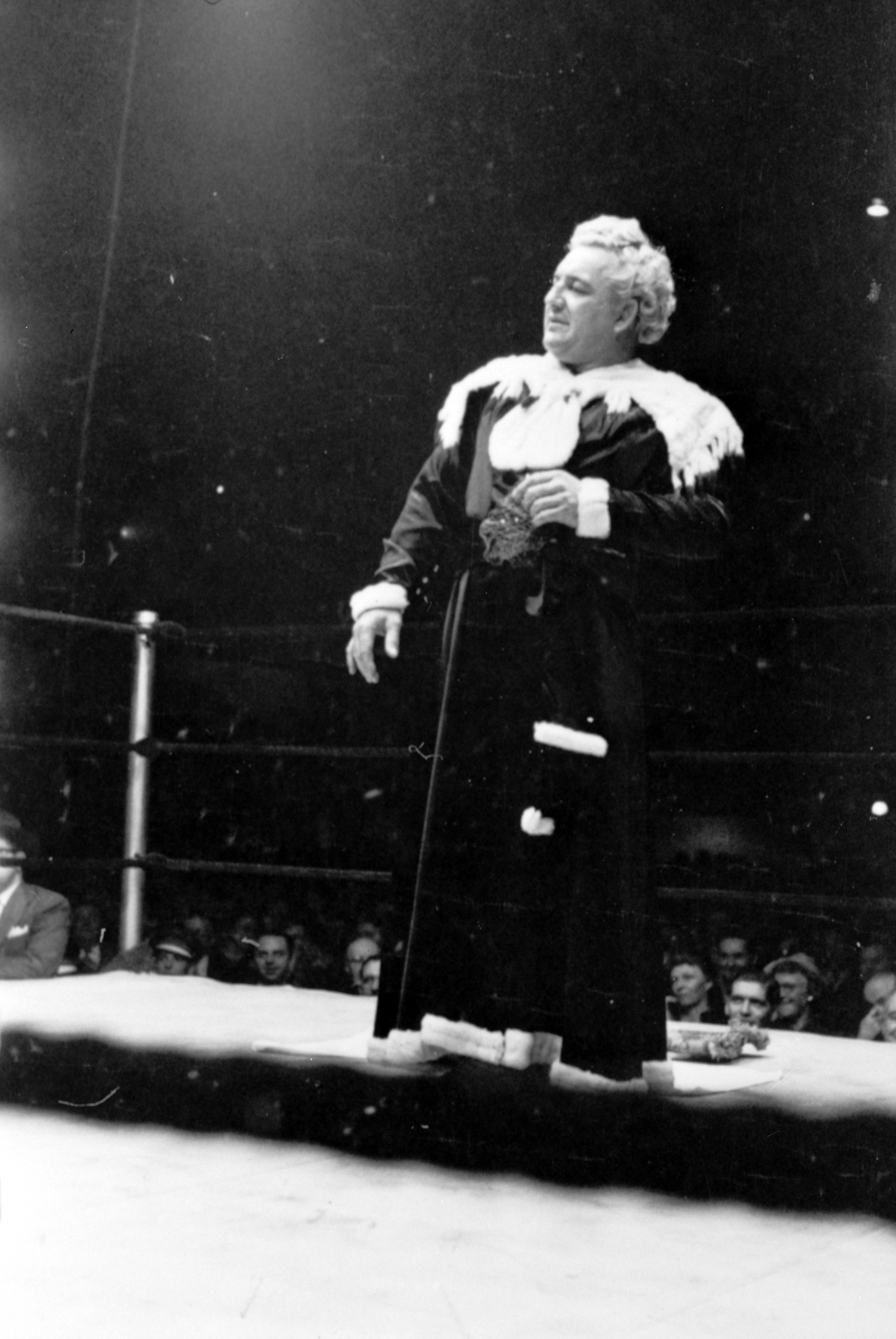
Gorgeous George

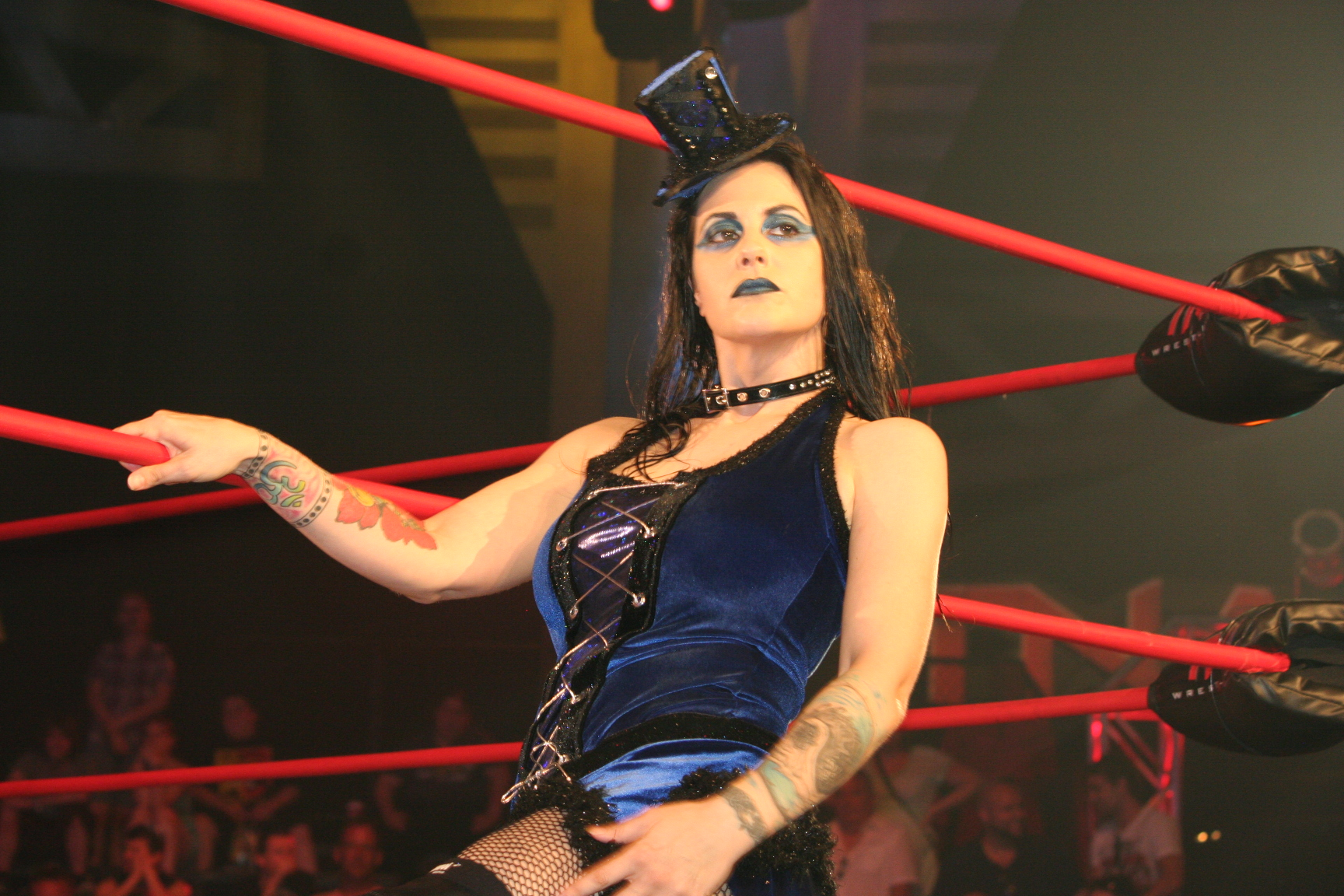
Daffney

Age	Ring name (Birth name)	Promotion(s) worked for	Date of birth	Date of death	Cause of death
40	Absolute Andy (Andreas Ullmann)	WXW, various German and European promotions	September 22, 1983	November 23, 2023	Illness
40	Sambo Asako (Fumiharu Asako)	FMW, various Japanese promotions	August 27, 1963	May 18, 2004	Diabetes
40	Bad Bones (John Klinger)	WXW, BJW, Impact Wrestling, various German and European promotions	May 14, 1984	May 20, 2024	Heart attack
40	Chris Benoit	Stampede Wrestling, NJPW, ECW, WCW, WWF/E	May 21, 1967	June 24, 2007	Suicide by hanging
40	Brady Boone (Dean Peters)	PNW, MACW, WCW, WWF	August 22, 1958	December 15, 1998	Car crash
40	Larry Chene (Arthur Lawrence Beauchene)	NWA Detroit, NWA, NWA Texas, AWA	June 22, 1924	October 2, 1964	Car crash
40	Cincinnati Red (Gregory Scott Daves)	NWC, EWF, independent circuit	October 17, 1974	March 20, 2015	Heart attack
40	Ron Dupree (Russ Groves)	NWA, NWA Detroit, GCCW	1935	October 17, 1975	Heart attack
40	Don Eagle (Carl Donald Bell)	AWA, NWA Chicago, NWA	August 25, 1925	March 17, 1966	Suicide by gunshot
40	Terry Gordy	WCCW, NWA, WCW, ECW, WWF, AJPW	April 23, 1961	July 16, 2001	Blood clot
40	Frank Gotch	N/A	April 27, 1877	December 16, 1917	Uremic poisoning
40	Shinya Hashimoto	NJPW, Zero1, Stampede Wrestling, Hustle, NWA, USWA	July 3, 1965	July 11, 2005	Brain aneurysm
40	Scott Henson	Elite Canadian Championship Wrestling, independent circuit	July 13, 1983	June 15, 2024	Unknown
40	Chris Kanyon (Christopher Klucsarits)	WCW, WWF/E, ECW, SMW, NWA Shockwave	January 4, 1970	April 2, 2010	Suicide by drug overdose
40	George Kotsonaros	N/A	October 16, 1892	July 13, 1933	Car crash
40	Pac (Benjamin Satterley)	WWE, AEW, PWG, ROH, Chikara, Dragongate, 1PW	August 22, 1986	September 27, 2026	Bronchial asthma
40	Pequeño Nitro	CMLL	March 9, 1984	May 18, 2024	Unknown
40	Rick Rude (Richard Rood)	CWF, WCCW, WWF, ECW, WCW	December 7, 1958	April 20, 1999	Heart failure
40	Gordon Scozzari	promoter for AWF	June 26, 1970	January 5, 2011	complications from kidney disease
40	Rhonda Sing	WWF, WCW, Stampede Wrestling, AJW, WWC, AAA	February 21, 1961	July 27, 2001	Unknown
40	Robert Swenson	WCCW, GWF, WCW	January 5, 1957	August 18, 1997	Heart failure
40	Vivian Vachon (Diane Vachon)	AWA, WWWF, CWF, International Wrestling, NWA	February 14, 1951	August 25, 1991	Car crash
40–41	Gulam (Ghulam Mohammad)	Wrestled in Europe and India	1860	1901	Cholera
41	Atsushi Aoki	AJPW, Noah, AAA	September 25, 1977	June 3, 2019	Motorcycle accident
41	Sam Bass (Fred Bass)	NWA, CCW, NWA Mid-America	April 19, 1935	July 27, 1976	Car crash
41	Big Boss Man (Ray Traylor)	WCW, MACW, WWF, AJPW, UWF, IWA Japan	May 2, 1963	September 22, 2004	Heart attack
41	Larry Cameron	Stampede Wrestling, NWA, AWA, CWA	November 4, 1952	December 13, 1993	Heart attack in match
41	Alan Carnill	IWF Promotions, independent circuit	March 12, 1962	January 25, 2004	Car crash
41	John Foti (John Fotie)	Stampede Wrestling, NWA, AWA, WWWF	March 13, 1928	April 29, 1969	Suicide
41	Yusuf İsmail	N/A	1857	July 4, 1898	Drowned during the SS La Bourgogne disaster
41	Koba Kurtanidze	FMW	October 13, 1964	December 6, 2005	Years of bedridden from injuries
41	Brodie Lee aka Luke Harper (Jonathan Huber)	WWE, AEW, FCW, ROH, Dragon Gate, Chikara, Dragon Gate USA	December 16, 1979	December 26, 2020	Pulmonary fibrosis
41	Jerry London (Jerry Linden)	NWA, CWC, Stampede Wrestling, MLW	July 9, 1929	September 20, 1970	Suicide (overdose of sleeping pills)
41	Knuckles Madsen (Kevin Nikel)	WWE, OVW, independent circuit	January 31, 1984	July 11, 2025	Murder (shot)
41	Hack Meyers (Donald Havilland)	ECW, FOW, IPW, FC !Bang!	December 7, 1973	December 5, 2015	Complications from brain surgery
41	Justice Pain (Christopher Wilson)	CZW, XPW, IPW, JAPW, BJW	May 16, 1978	January 24, 2020	Suicide by jumping off bridge
41	Jackie Sato (Naoko Sato)	AJW, JWPW	October 30, 1957	August 9, 1999	Stomach cancer
41	Billy Travis (Gary Mize)	CWA, USWA, WWF, PPW	April 29, 1961	November 23, 2002	Heart attack
41	Adam Windsor (Adam Bryniarski)	Funking Conservatory, NWA Wildside, WXW, independent circuit, various promotions in England	January 17, 1981	April 21, 2022	Heart issues
41-42	Manjiro "Matty" Matsuda	N/A	1887	August 15, 1929	Injuries during match
42	Randy Anderson	referee for WCW, NWA	July 17, 1959	May 5, 2002	Testicular cancer
42	Mike Awesome (Michael Alfonso)	AJPW, FMW, ECW, WCW, WWF, MLW	January 24, 1965	February 17, 2007	Suicide by hanging
42	John Ayers	UWF	April 14, 1953	October 2, 1995	Liver cancer
42	Bruiser Brody (Frank Goodish)	NWA, AJPW, WWWF, WCCW	June 18, 1946	July 17, 1988	Murdered
42	Ray Candy (Ray Canty)	NWA, AJPW, WWC, NJPW, WCW	December 3, 1951	May 23, 1994	Heart attack
42	Miss Elizabeth (Elizabeth Hulette)	WWF, WCW, ICW	November 19, 1960	May 1, 2003	Drug overdose
42	Hiromichi Fuyuki	AJPW, NJPW, FMW, IWE, NWA, CWA	May 11, 1960	March 19, 2003	Intestinal cancer
42	John Tenta	WWF, WCW, ASW, AJPW	June 22, 1963	June 7, 2006	Bladder cancer
42	Biff Wellington (Shayne Bower)	Stampede Wrestling, WCW, NJPW, ECW	April 18, 1965	June 24, 2007	Heart attack
42	Xavier (John Bedoya)	ROH, WWE, ECWA, JAPW, NEW, CW	December 28, 1977	August 16, 2020	Unknown
42–43	George Gardiner	Wrestled only in Australia and New Zealand	1898	May 18, 1941	Peritonitis
42-43	Marie Lograsso (Dina DeStefano)	World Championship Wrestling	1963	March 14, 2006	Drug overdose
43	Brian Adams	PNW, NJPW, WWF, WCW, AJPW	April 14, 1964	August 13, 2007	Drug overdose
43	Ángel Azteca (Juan Manuel Zúñiga)	AAA, CMLL, UWA	June 24, 1963	March 18, 2007	Heart attack after match
43	Nancy Benoit	CWF, ECW, WCW	May 17, 1964	June 22, 2007	Murder
43	Doctor X (Clemente Nájera)	CMLL	July 17, 1968	October 11, 2011	Murder
43	Héctor Garza(Héctor Solano Segura)	CMLL, Perros del Mal, WCW, WWF	June 12, 1969	May 26, 2013	Lung cancer
43	Franky Gee (Francisco Gutierrez)	FMW	February 19, 1962	October 22, 2005	Cerebral hemorrhage
43	Rocky Hata (Mitsuo Hata)	AJPW, CSW, GCW, NWA Tri-State, CWF	September 12, 1948	October 27, 1991	Complications from diabetes
43	Jocephus (Joseph Hudson)	NWA	July 1, 1977	February 24, 2021	Congenital heart defect
43	Georg Lurich	N/A	22 April [O.S. 10 April] 1876	20 January 1920	Typhus
43	Corey Maclin	Announcer for USWA, PPW, Memphis Wrestling	May 6, 1970	July 31, 2013	Car crash
43	Sean O'Haire (Sean Haire)	WCW, OVW, WWF/E, NJPW, UPW	February 25, 1971	September 8, 2014	Suicide by hanging
43	Goga Pehlwan (Goga Moazzam)	Wrestled only in India	1937	February 6, 1981	Died in the ring
43	Reggie Roby	WWF	July 30, 1961	February 22, 2005	Believed to be heart attack
43	Tony Rumble (Anthony Magliaro)	NWA New England, ECW, ICW, AWA, IWCCW, WCW	November 6, 1956	November 13, 1999	Heart attack
43	Peter Smit	RINGS	December 24, 1961	August 15, 2005	Murder
43	Viscera (Nelson Frazier, Jr.)	WWF/E, AJPW, USWA, TNA, Memphis Wrestling	February 14, 1971	February 18, 2014	Heart attack
43	Eddie Osbourne (Mike Beschner)	Various Canadian promotions	April 28, 1983	September 30, 2026	Unknown
44	Carl Abs	N/A	September 12, 1851	February 18, 1895	Liver and kidney failure
44	Dino Bravo (Adolfo Bresciano)	NWA, AWA, Lutte Internationale, WWF	August 6, 1948	March 11, 1993	Murder
44	The Bruiser (RJ Meyer)	MCW, Independent Circuit	August 15, 1976	November 16, 2020	Leukemia
44	Dustin Diamond	TNA, independent circuit, MCW, Hulk Hogan's Celebrity Championship Wrestling	January 7, 1977	February 1, 2021	Cancer
44	Joe Doering	Impact Wrestling, AJPW, NJPW	April 16, 1982	June 26, 2026	Brain Tumor and years of health issues
44	Eric The Red (Ib Solvang Hansen)	WWWF, NWF, IWA, AWA, NJPW, CWF	August 1, 1934	November 16, 1978	Car crash
44	Danny Fargo (Audie Hager)	WWC, CWA, NWA, SWCW	June 13, 1959	December 26, 2003	Cancer
44	Mark Frear	WWF, USWA, MEWF, independent circuit	February 1, 1970	May 11, 2014	Unknown
44	Jorge González	WCW, WWF, NJPW	January 31, 1966	September 22, 2010	Diabetes and severe heart issues
44	Curt Hennig	AWA, PNW, WWF/E, WCW, TNA	March 28, 1958	February 10, 2003	Combined drug intoxication
44	Koichiro Kimura	AJPW, DDT Pro-Wrestling, RINGS, W*ING, WJ	November 18, 1969	October 28, 2014	Pneumonia
44	Balls Mahoney (Jonathan Rechner)	ECW, SMW, WWF/E	April 11, 1972	April 12, 2016	Heart attack
44	Emil Naucke	N/A	May 2, 1855	January 25, 1900	Heart attack
44	Kevin Randleman	AJPW, Zero1, Hustle	August 10, 1971	February 11, 2016	Heart attack and pneumonia
44	Billy Reil	JAPW, independent circuit	June 19, 1979	April 29, 2024	Years of health issues
44	Axl Rotten (Brian Knighton)	ECW, MEWF, IWA Mid-South, WCW, WWE	April 21, 1971	February 4, 2016	Drug overdose
44–45	Nurullah Hasan	N/A	1867	1912	Unknown
45	Toni Adams (Toni Collins)	UWF, WCCW, USWA	August 19, 1964	June 24, 2010	Heart attack
45	Andre Baker	Joint Promotions, ASW, NWA-UK Hammerlock	December 24, 1964	May 15, 2010	Suicide
45	Bam Bam Bigelow (Scott Bigelow)	CWA, WWF/E, ECW, WCW, NJPW	September 1, 1961	January 19, 2007	Drug overdose
45	Jerry Blackwell	AWA, WWWF, NWA, MACW, AJPW	April 26, 1949	January 22, 1995	Complications from car accident
45	Stephan Bonnar	Impact Wrestling, House Of Glory, independent circuit	April 4, 1977	December 22, 2022	Heart attack caused by accidental fentanyl overdose
45	Nick Campofreda	N/A	January 14, 1914	May 23, 1959	Heart Attack
45	Mike Davis	CWA, MACW, WCCW, GWF, WCW	November 2, 1956	December 26, 2001	Heart attack
45	Iron Mike DiBiase	AWA, NWA, WCCW, CSW	December 24, 1923	July 2, 1969	Heart attack
45	Junkyard Dog (Sylvester Ritter)	Stampede Wrestling, IWE, NWA, UWF, WWF, WCW	December 13, 1952	June 2, 1998	Car crash
45	Aya Koyama	AJW, BJW, JWPW, JDStar, Gaea Japan	March 8, 1973	August 27, 2018	Cancer
45	Pasión Kristal (José Gabriel Zentella Damián)	AAA, IWRG, various Mexican promotions	January 9, 1976	June 2, 2021	Drowning
45	Peter Maivia (Pita Fanene Anderson)	NWA, AWA, NJPW, NWA Hawaii, WWWF	April 6, 1937	June 13, 1982	Cancer
45	Johan Olin	N/A	June 30, 1883	December 3, 1928	Unknown
45	Val Puccio	AJPW, WWF, ECW	June 9, 1965	January 7, 2011	Believed to be obesity
45	Jean Pusie	wrestled various promotions in Quebec	October 15, 1910	April 21, 1956	Heart attack
46	Chris Adams	WCCW, UWF, SCW, WCW, Joint Promotions, AWF	February 10, 1955	October 7, 2001	Shot
46	André the Giant (André René Roussimoff)	NWA, Lutte Internationale, NJPW, IWE, AWA, WWF, AJPW	May 19, 1946	January 28, 1993	Congestive heart failure
46	Argentina Apollo (Vincente Denigris)	WWWF, NWA, CWF, MACW, AJPW, IWA	April 28, 1938	August 2, 1984	Heart attack
46	Brian Christopher (Brian Lawler)	WWF/E, USWA, TNA, WWA, Memphis Wrestling	January 10, 1972	July 29, 2018	Suicide by hanging
46	Chyna (Joanie Laurer)	WWF, NJPW, TNA	December 27, 1969	April 20, 2016	Medication overdose
46	Floyd Creatchman	Lutte Internationale, NWA Detroit	June 25, 1957	October 26, 2003	Crohn's disease
46	Daffney (Shannon Spruill)	WCW, TNA, OVW, Wrestlicious, SHIMMER, ACW	July 17, 1975	September 1, 2021	Suicide by gunshot
46	Chick Garibaldi(Charles Curcuru)	NWA	August 18, 1914	February 18, 1961	Heart attack (during match)
46	Herman Hickman	NWA	October 1, 1911	April 25, 1958	Unknown
46	Magnificent Maurice (Eugene Dubuque)	WWWF, NWA, AWA, NWA San Francisco, NWA Hawaii	December 11, 1927	March 13, 1974	Plane crash
46	Maximum Capacity (Michael Stanco)	NWA, FOW, Zero1, Hustle, wrestled in various promotions in Europe	August 2, 1968	August 21, 2014	Colorectal cancer
46	Mitsuharu Misawa	AJPW, Pro Wrestling Noah, NJPW, JPW, NWA, ROH	June 18, 1962	June 13, 2009	Heart attack after cervical spinal cord injury in match
46	Mr. Niebla (Efrén Tiburcio Márquez)	CMLL, AAA	February 22, 1973	December 23, 2019	Blood infection
46	Víctor Quiñones	IWA, FMW, IWA Japan, WWC, W*ING	June 30, 1959	April 1, 2006	Mix of alcohol and drug overdose
46	Road Warrior Hawk (Michael Hegstrand)	AWA, Lutte Internationale, NWA, AJPW, WWF, WCW, NJPW	January 12, 1957	October 19, 2003	Heart attack
46	Bestia Salvaje (Juan Rodriguez)	CMLL	February 11, 1962	March 20, 2008	Liver disease
46	Sam Sheppard	NWA Los Angeles	December 29, 1923	April 6, 1970	Wernicke encephalopathy
46	Gus Sonnenberg	NWA, DWU	March 6, 1898	September 9, 1944	Leukemia
47	Ángel Blanco (José Ángel Vargas Sánchez)	EMLL, UWA, NJPW	August 2, 1938	April 26, 1986	Car crash
47	Tiger Jack Fox(John Linwood Fox)	N/A	April 2, 1907	April 6, 1954	Heart attack
47	Tony Halme	NJPW, WWF, CWA	January 6, 1963	January 8, 2010	Suicide by gunshot
47	Tomohiko Hashimoto	DDT, FMW, various promotions in Japan	August 16, 1977	August 5, 2025	Cancer
47	Hayabusa (Eiji Ezaki)	FMW, ECW, CMLL, AJPW	November 29, 1968	March 3, 2016	Subarachnoid hemorrhage
47	Hercules (Ray Fernandez)	NWA, WWF, NJPW, WCW, CWF, NWA St. Louis	May 7, 1956	March 6, 2004	Heart disease
47	Dan Kolov (Doncho Danev)	N/A	December 27, 1892	March 26, 1940	Tuberculosis
47	Bob Konovsky	NWA, NWA Chicago	August 19, 1934	March 6, 1982	Unknown
47	Luther Lindsay (Luther Goodall)	NWA, Stampede Wrestling, PNW, MACW	December 30, 1924	February 21, 1972	Heart attack in match
47	Man Mountain Mike (Gary Fletcher)	NWA, AWA, WWWF	September 15, 1940	April 30, 1988	Heart attack
47	Rosey (Matthew Anoa'i)	WWE, HWA, WXW, ECW, AJPW	April 7, 1970	April 17, 2017	Congestive heart failure
47	Skulu (Televise Masalosalo)	UPW, Hustle, Pro Wrestling Zero1, independent circuit	April 2, 1973	December 21, 2020	Unknown
47	Starman (Othoniel Trejo)	CMLL, NJPW	November 16, 1974	September 23, 2022	Unknown
47	Big John Studd (John Minton)	NWA, AWA, WWF, NAWA	February 19, 1948	March 20, 1995	Liver cancer
47	Micah Taylor (Michael Sharrer)	OVW, DSW, Pro Wrestling Zero1, independent circuit	May 21, 1977	September 12, 2024	Unknown
47	El Texano (Juan Aguilar Jauregui)	UWA, WCW, CMLL, AAA	November 26, 1958	January 15, 2006	Pneumonia
48	Tom Burton	WWF, USWA, GWF, UWFi, WCW, IWA Mid-South	October 14, 1961	March 29, 2010	Chronic obstructive pulmonary disease
48	Francisco Ciatso (Frank Caizzo)	Independent Circuit, USWA, NWA, TNA, DSW	November 5, 1975	January 20, 2024	Unknown
48	Chris Colt (Charles Harris)	NWA, NWA Detroit, PNW, NWA Vancouver	June 22, 1946	May 23, 1995	Unknown (AIDS, a drug overdose or suicide)
48	Cousin Junior (Lanny Kean)	WWF, CWA, NWA, USWA	March 19, 1960	January 13, 2009	Heart attack
48	Dennis Coralluzzo	NWA New Jersey promoter	March 5, 1953	July 21, 2001	Brain bleed due to a stroke
48	Jax Dane (Jeremy Dane Laymon)	NWA, ROH, TNA, NJPW	March 10, 1976	December 25, 2024	Heart complications
48	Doc Dean (Ian Dean)	ASW, WCW, NJPW, European Wrestling Federation (France)	July 3, 1970	August 14, 2018	Heart attack
48	Steve Doll	WWF, PNW, WCW, AJPW, IWA Mid-South, USWA	December 9, 1960	March 22, 2009	Blood clot
48	Gorgeous George (George Wagner)	NWA	March 24, 1915	December 26, 1963	Heart attack
48	Ray Gunkel	NWA, GCW	February 15, 1924	August 1, 1972	Heart attack after match
48	Diana La Cazadora (Alma Corina Gutiérrez)	CMLL, independent circuit	January 16, 1978	August 8, 2026	Lung infection
48	Don Ross	NWAHW, NWA	October 6, 1946	June 2, 1995	Heart attack
48	Harley Saito (Sayori Saito)	LLPW, Frontier Martial-Arts Wrestling	December 21, 1967	December 15, 2016	Esophageal cancer
48	Ryan Sakoda	WWE, UPW, Zero1, EWF, XWF, WSX	December 31, 1972	September 2, 2021	Unknown
48	Luna Vachon (Gertrude Vachon)	CWF, WWF, WCW, ECW, POWW	January 12, 1962	August 27, 2010	Drug overdose
48	Clarence Weber	Wrestled only in Australia	March 27, 1882	November 20, 1930	Coronary occlusion
48	Andy Williams	AEW, ROH, independent circuit	December 12, 1977	September 5, 2026	Heart attack
48	Mark Young (Joe Scarpa Jr.)	WWF, WCW, PNW, AJPW	April 23, 1967	February 25, 2016	Unknown
48	Yukon Eric (Eric Holmback)	NWA, MLW, AWA	April 16, 1916	January 16, 1965	Suicide by gunshot
49	Sheik Ali (Wadi Ayoub)	WCW Australia, Joint Promotions, and various international promotions	April 20, 1927	September 29, 1976	Cancer
49	Big Titan (Rick Bognar)	FMW, WWF, WAR, USWA, CWA, NJPW	January 16, 1970	September 20, 2019	Heart attack
49	Louis Cyr (Cyprien-Noé Cyr)	N/A	October 10, 1863	November 10, 1912	Chronic nephritis
49	Jack Claybourne (Elmer Claybourne)	NWA, NWA Hawaii, MLW	March 8, 1910	January 7, 1960	Suicide by gunshot
49	Dean Detton	NWA	June 27, 1908	February 23, 1958	Suicide by hanging
49	Espectrito (Mario Jiminez)	EMLL, AAA, WWF, IWA Puerto Rico	December 18, 1966	January 23, 2016	Unknown
49	La Fiera (Arturo Casco Hernández)	EMLL, AAA, AJPW, NJPW	March 17, 1961	September 12, 2010	Murder
49	Kung Fu (Raymundo Cuesta Veloz)	EMLL, UWA	January 20, 1951	January 3, 2001	Arterial hypertension
49	Hideki Hosaka	FMW, AJPW, Pro Wrestling Zero1, BJPW, various Japanese Promotions	August 5, 1971	August 2, 2021	Liver and colon cancer
49	Bullwhip Johnson (Daniel Johnston)	NWA, WCW, Lutte International	January 6, 1954	July 20, 2003	Liver cirrhosis
49	David Khakhaleishvili	RINGS	February 28, 1971	January 11, 2021	Complications from heart surgery
49	Sherri Martel (Sherry Russell)	AWA, WWF, WCW, ECW	February 8, 1958	June 15, 2007	Drug overdose
49	Piratita Morgan (Raymundo Rodríguez)	EMLL, WWC, AAA, WWF, WWA, TNA	March 15, 1969	July 8, 2018	Health issues
49	Dick Murdoch (Hoyt Murdoch)	CWF, NWA, WWF, AJPW, NJPW, WCW,	August 16, 1946	June 15, 1996	Heart attack
49	Lynn Nelson	Only wrestled in North Dakota	February 24, 1905	February 19, 1955	Unknown
49	Raizel (Name unknown)	CMLL, AAA, IWRG, NJPW, various Mexican promotions	February 8, 1973	April 4, 2022	Unknown
49	Rocco Rock (Ted Petty)	ECW, NWA, WCW, WWF	September 1, 1953	September 21, 2002	Heart attack
49	Ray Steele (Peter Sauer)	NWA	February 2, 1900	September 11, 1949	Heart attack
49	Supreme (Lester Perfors)	XPW, FMW, Perros del Mal, independent circuit	May 30, 1970	May 6, 2020	Heart attack
49	Jumbo Tsuruta (Tomomi Tsuruta)	AJPW, NWA, AWA	March 25, 1951	May 13, 2000	Complications of a liver transplant
49	Grigory Verichev	FMW	April 4, 1957	May 25, 2006	Unknown
49	"Dr. Death" Steve Williams	Mid-South/UWF, NWA, WWF, WCW, AJPW, ECW	May 14, 1960	December 29, 2009	Throat cancer

=== Under 60 ===
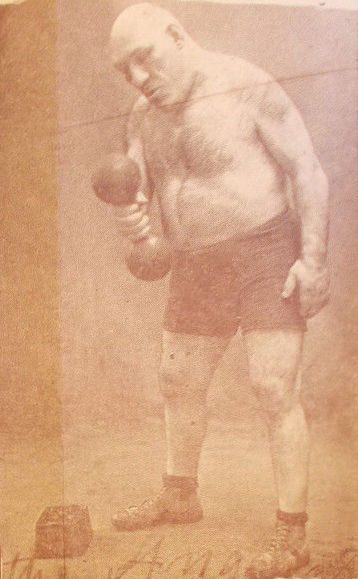
The French Angel

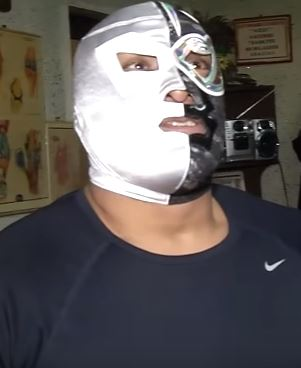
Silver King

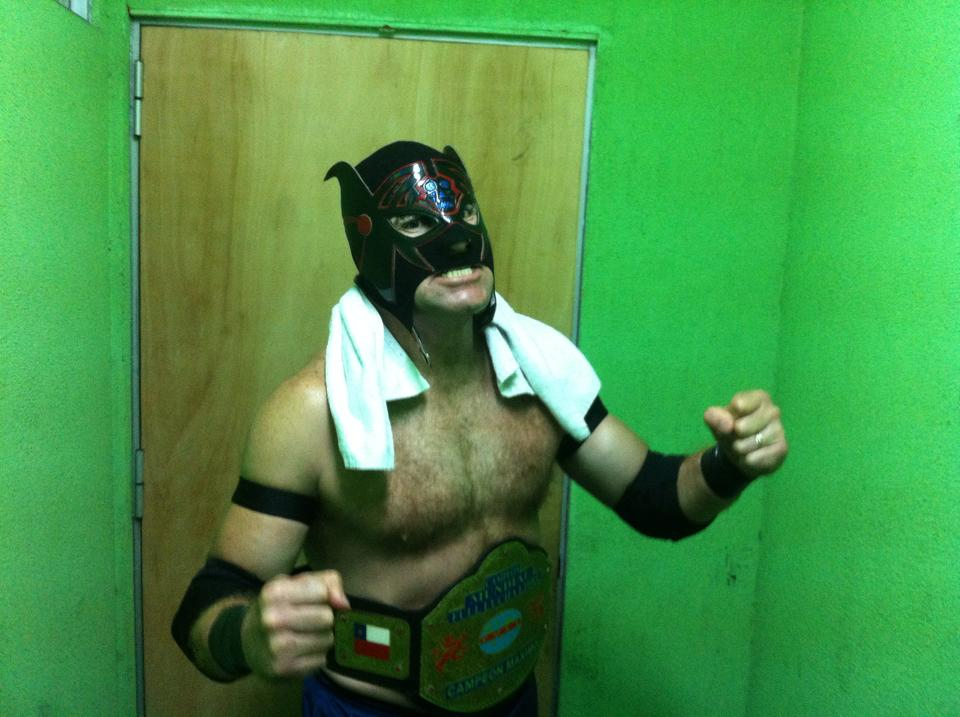
Arkangel de la Muerte

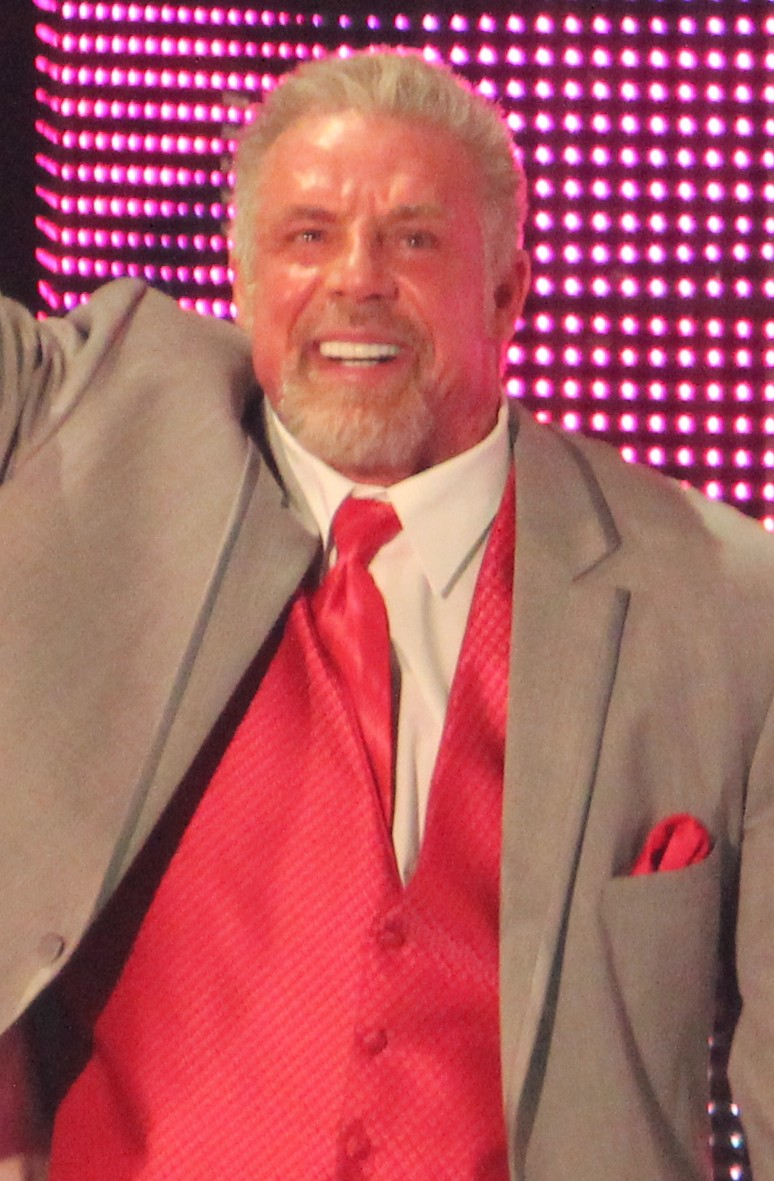
The Ultimate Warrior

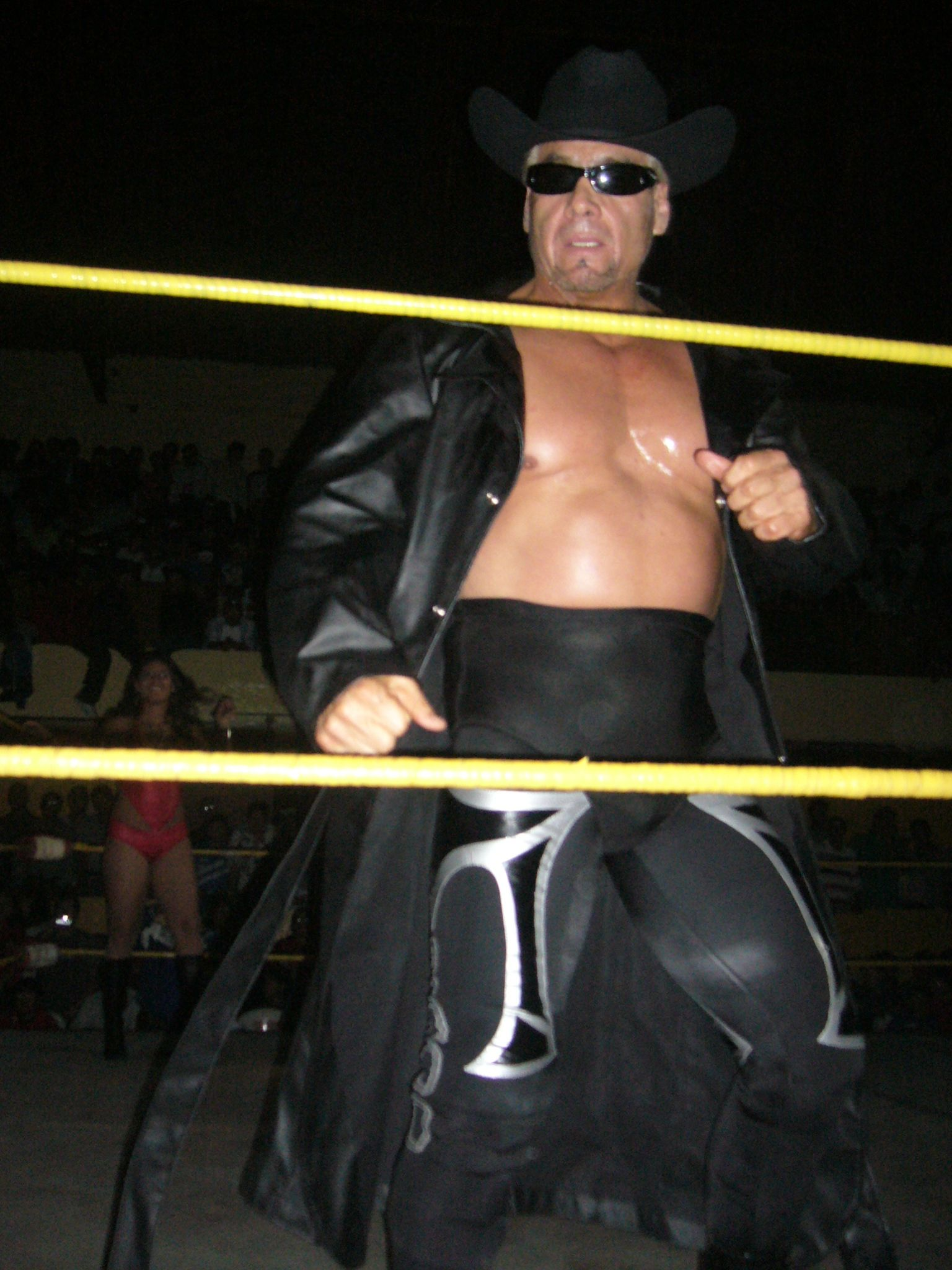
Universo 2000

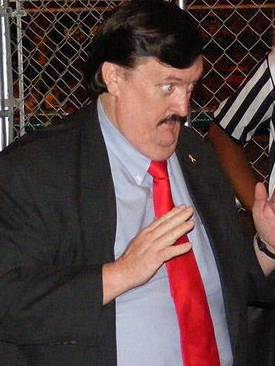
Paul Bearer

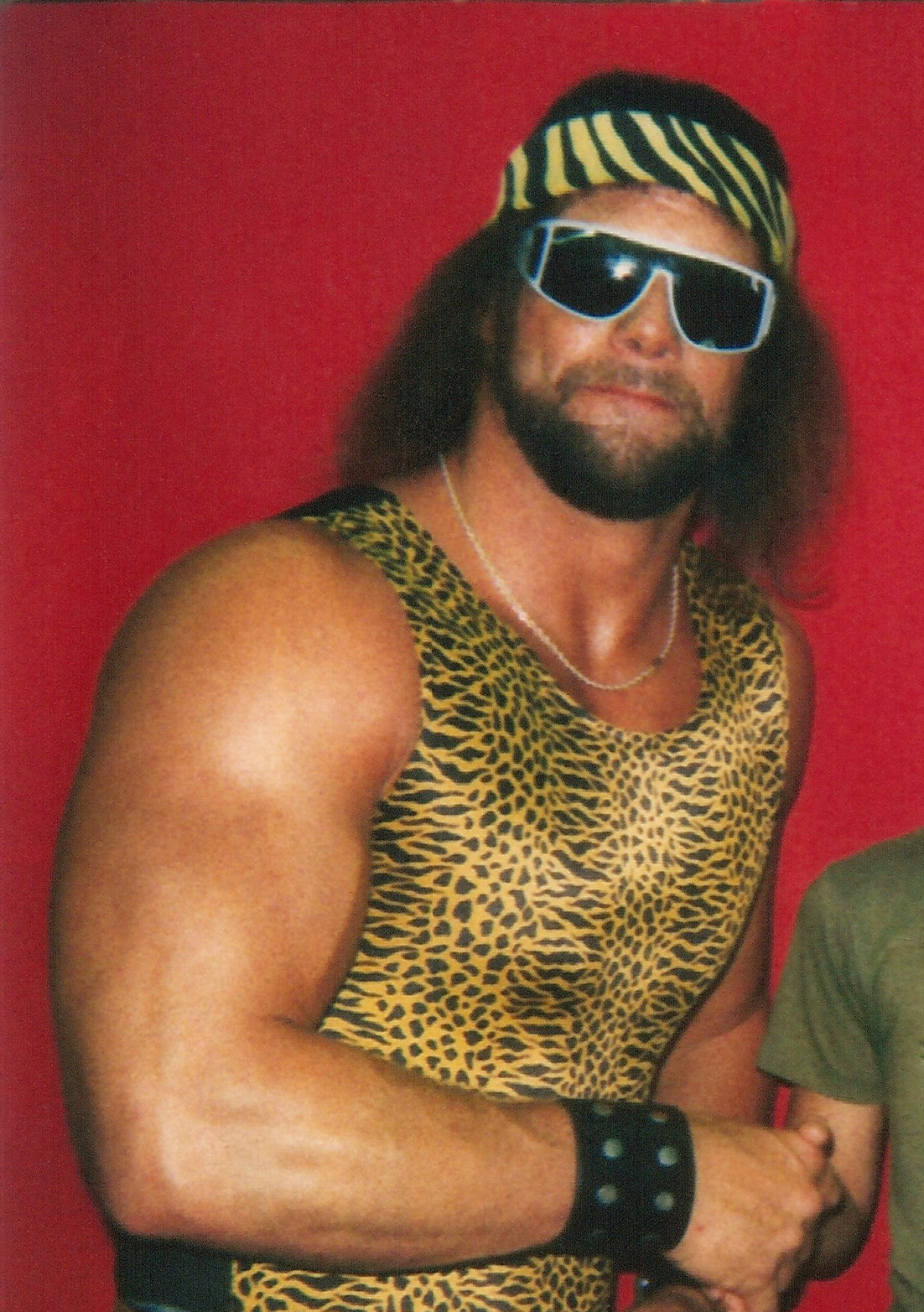
Randy Savage

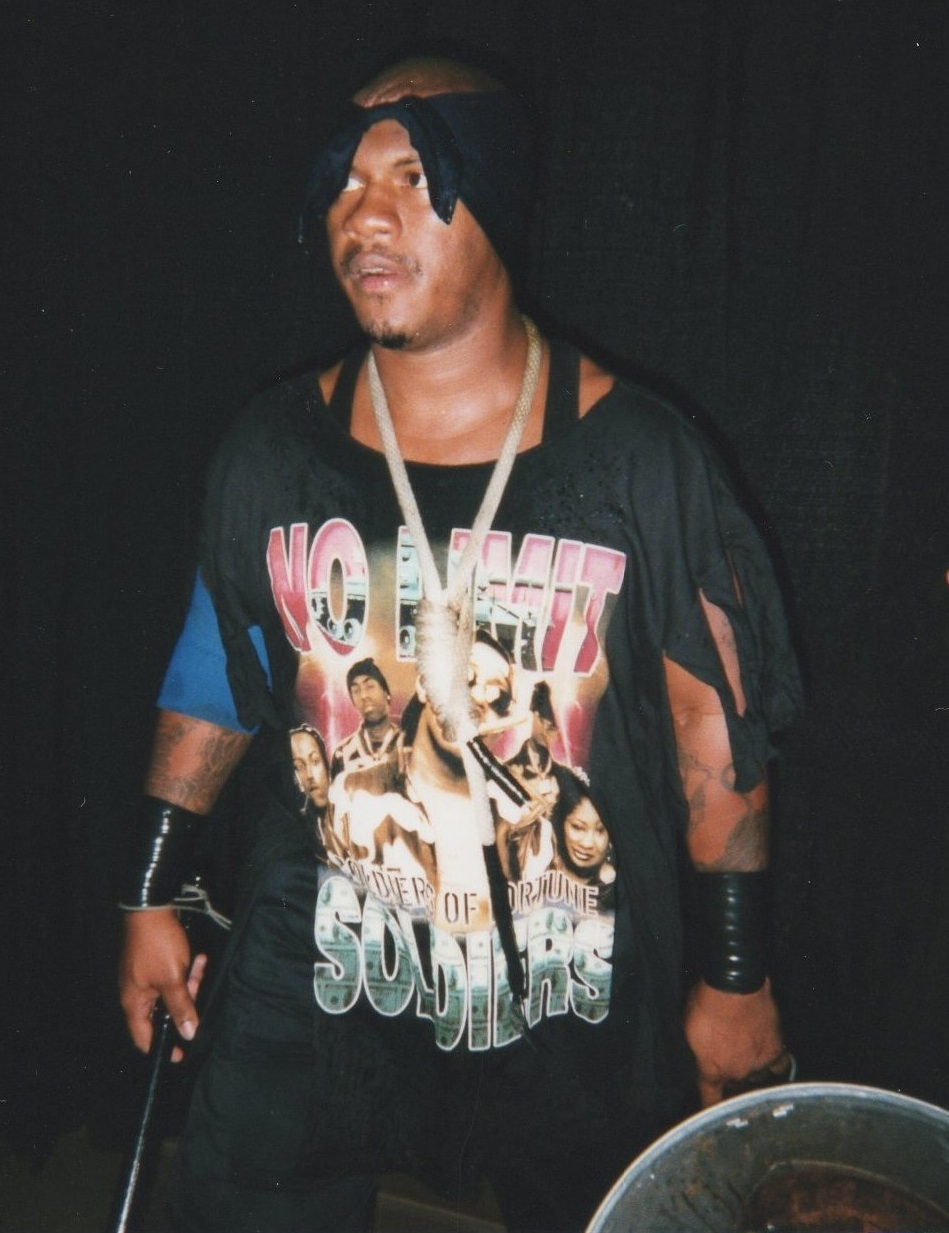
New Jack

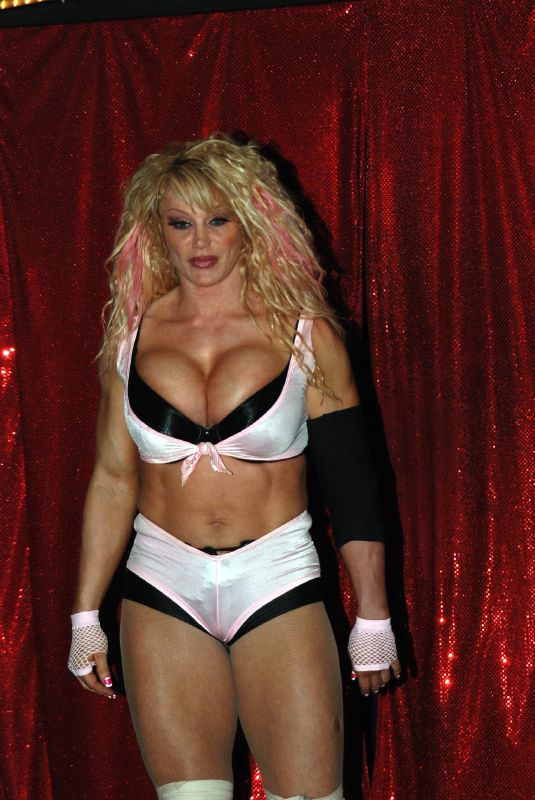
Melissa Coates

Age	Ring name (Birth name)	Promotion(s) worked for	Date of birth	Date of death	Cause of death
50	Brad Armstrong (Robert Bradley James)	WCW, NWA, SMW, NJPW, USWA, WWE	June 15, 1962	November 1, 2012	Heart attack
50	Max Baer	unknown	February 11, 1909	November 21, 1959	Heart attack
50	The French Angel (Maurice Tillet)	AWA, NWA, NWA Tri-State	October 23, 1903	September 4, 1954	Cardiovascular disease
50	Fuzzy Cupid (Leon Stap)	WWWF, NWA	September 24, 1928	April 26, 1979	Unknown
50	Ivan Gomes	NJPW	December 25, 1939	March 2, 1990	Renal illness
50	Leroy Howard	WCW, WWF, CWA, Battlarts, IWA Puerto Rico, WWC	August 5, 1968	October 8, 2018	Unknown
50	King Kong Kirk (Malcolm Kirk)	Joint Promotions, CWA, ASW, NWA	December 18, 1936	August 24, 1987	Heart attack in match
50	Yakov Kozalchik	Wrestled only in Israel	July 13, 1902	June 13, 1953	Starvation from depression
50	Dave Legeno (David Steven Murray)	British Wrestling Federation	October 12, 1963	July 6, 2014	Heat illness
50	Lucifer (Tim Burke)	MEWF, IPWA, ECWA, MCW	October 1, 1960	June 21, 2011	Cancer
50	Kızılcıklı Mahmut	N/A	1880	February 3, 1931	Unknown
50	Billy Papke	N/A	September 17, 1886	November 26, 1936	Murder-suicide
50	Paul Pons	N/A	June 23, 1864	April 13, 1915	Drowning
50	Mark Starr (Mark Ashford-Smith)	WCW, CWF, CWA, WWF, PWFG, FMW	December 26, 1962	June 7, 2013	Heart attack
50	Sweet Georgia Brown (Susie Mae McCoy)	NWA, MACW, Stampede Wrestling	December 22, 1938	July 25, 1989	Breast cancer
50	Villano I (José de Jesús Díaz Mendoza)	UWA, CMLL	June 28, 1950	January 4, 2001	Cerebral hemorrhage
50	Buddy Wayne (Steve Finley)	NWA Vancouver, PNW, WWF, WCW, ECCW	May 27, 1967	June 15, 2017	Heart attack
50	Bearcat Wright (Edward Wright)	NWA, CWC, Stampede Wrestling, CWF, NJPW	January 13, 1932	August 28, 1982	Sickle cell anemia
50	Yar (Raymond Gajtkowski)	NWA, JAPW, ECW, independent circuit	March 5, 1971	September 1, 2021	Unknown
50	Yutaka Yoshie	NJPW, AJPW, Zero1, Toryumon, Noah, various Japanese promotions	January 5, 1974	March 10, 2024	Arteriosclerosis
51	Arkangel de la Muerte (Alfredo Pasillas)	CMLL	July 16, 1966	June 13, 2018	Cardiac arrest
51	Al Mills (Adolph Mittlestadt)	AWA, Stampede Wrestling	1910	July 10, 1961	Unknown
51	Verlon Biggs	CWA, UWF Mid-South	March 16, 1943	June 7, 1994	Leukemia
51	Black Cat (Victor Manuel)	UWA, NJPW, AAA, WCW	October 17, 1954	January 28, 2006	Heart attack
51	Kerry Brown	Stampede Wrestling, GPW, Lutte Internationale, WWC, NWA, NJPW	February 3, 1958	September 10, 2009	Liver failure
51	Renato Gardini	N/A	March 20, 1889	September 29, 1940	Unknown
51	Hido (Hideo Takayama)	BJW, IWA-MS, FMW, W*ING	October 19, 1969	October 17, 2021	Unknown
51	Jimmy Jackson	UWF Mid-South, WWF, MACW	July 28, 1956	June 17, 2008	Unknown
51	Jun Izumida	AJPW, NOAH	October 28, 1965	January 25, 2017	Heart attack
51	Azumafuji Kin'ichi (Kinichi Inoue)	JWA, NWA Hawaii	October 28, 1921	July 31, 1973	Colon cancer
51	Harvey Martin	WWF, WCCW, GWF	November 16, 1950	December 24, 2001	Pancreatic cancer
51	Mighty Jumbo (Samuel Thomas Hesser)	NWA, CWC, MLW NWA Mid-America	June 25, 1923	September 3, 1974	Brain Tumor
51	Moondog Spot (Larry Latham)	WWF, CWA, NWA, USWA	June 6, 1952	November 29, 2003	Heart attack during match
51	Motoshi Okuma	AJPW, NWA, JWA, IWE	December 18, 1941	December 27, 1992	Kidney failure
51	Nikola Petroff (Nikola Petrov)	N/A	December 19, 1873	January 2, 1925	Unknown
51	Picudo (Arturo Hernández Herrada)	AAA, IWRG	August 3, 1967	August 3, 2018	Diabetes
51	Silver King (César Cuauhtémoc González Barrón)	UWA, WCW, CMLL, AJPW, NJPW, AAA	January 9, 1968	May 11, 2019	Stroke in ring, followed by heart attack
51	Paul Varelans	ECW, Kingdom	September 17, 1969	January 16, 2021	COVID-19
51	Maurice Webb	created the Admiral-Lord Mountevans rules in the United Kingdom	September 26, 1904	June 10, 1956	Unknown
51	Frankie Williams (Armando Pumarejo)	WWWF/WWF	February 20, 1940	April 23, 1991	Lung cancer
51	Emmanuel Yarbrough	CWA	September 5, 1964	December 21, 2015	Heart attack
52	Gene Anderson	AWA, NWA, GCW, MACW	October 4, 1939	October 31, 1991	Heart attack
52	Buddy Austin (Austin Wesley Rapes)	WWWF, NWA, JWA	February 27, 1929	August 12, 1981	Heart attack
52	Nicole Bass	WWF, ECW, XPW, NEO	August 10, 1964	February 17, 2017	Heart attack
52	Ady Berber	wrestled only in Austria and Germany	February 4, 1913	January 3, 1966	Unknown
52	Trevor Berbick	UWFi	August 1, 1954	October 28, 2006	Murder
52	El Brazo (Juan Alvarado Nieves)	WWA, AAA, UWA, CMLL	July 30, 1961	October 15, 2013	Diabetes
52	Melissa Coates	OVW, UPW, WSU, Independent Circuit	June 18, 1969	June 23, 2021	Complications from COVID-19
52	John Cozman	Stampede Wrestling, HIW, various independent circuit promotions in Canada	August 28, 1964	November 28, 2016	Unknown
52	Jimmy Del Ray (David Ferrier)	SMW, WWF, PWF, USWA, ECW, WCW	November 30, 1962	December 6, 2014	Heart attack
52	Espantito (Martín Rodríguez)	AAA, NWA, various promotions in Mexico and United States	April 24, 1968	October 12, 2020	Pneumonia
52	Doug Furnas (Dwight Furnas)	AJPW, CCW, WCW, WWF, ECW	December 11, 1959	March 2, 2012	Heart attack
52	George Gadaski (George Kosti)	AWA, NWA, Stampede Wrestling	April 30, 1930	December 16, 1982	Brain Tumor
52	Giant Haystacks (Martin Ruane)	Stampede Wrestling, Joint Promotions, CWA, AJPW, WCW	October 10, 1946	November 29, 1998	Lymphoma
52	Troy 'The Hippie' Graham (Troy Rolland Thompson Jr.)	AWA, CWA, NWA, USWA	October 26, 1949	March 7, 2002	Heart attack
52	Tonina Jackson (Héctor Garza Lozano Vela)	EMLL, NWA, NWA Mid-America, WCCW, WWWF	January 9, 1917	November 3, 1969	Possibly complications from health issues
52	Jim Jefferson	MACW, CWA, CSW, CWF	July 14, 1960	February 8, 2013	Unknown
52	Karol Kalmikoff (Karol Piwoworczyk)	NWA, AWA, NWA Tri-State, MLW	August 12, 1912	September 11, 1964	Heart attack
52	Ivan Linow (Jānis Linaus)	N/A	November 21, 1888	November 21, 1940	Heart attack
52	Miss Janeth (Janet Fragoso Alonso)	CMLL, AAA, W*ING, various Mexican promotions	January 14, 1973	December 17, 2025	
52	Paul Luty	Joint Promotions	May 4, 1932	January 12, 1985	Unknown
52	Rockin' Rebel (Charles Williams)	ECW, WCW, WWF, CZW, independent circuit	January 13, 1966	June 1, 2018	Murder-suicide
52	Silo Sam (John Elmo Harris)	WCCW, AWA	September 12, 1952	April 19, 2005	Unknown; possibly related to gigantism
52	Iron Mike Steele (John Meek)	CWF, Independent circuit	July 18, 1955	August 29, 2007	Vehicular homicide
52	Frank Wycheck	TNA	October 14, 1971	December 9, 2023	Head injuries from a fall
53	Aníbal (Carlos Contreras)	EMLL/CMLL, UWA	November 5, 1940	March 4, 1994	Brain tumor
53	Johnny Attitude (John Greene)	Founder of Micro Championship Wrestling, WCW, independent circuit	June 9, 1965	June 12, 2018	Unknown
53	George Bollas	NWA, NWA Hawaii, CWC, Joint Promotions, various European promotions	September 19, 1923	January 28, 1977	Heart failure
53	Johnny K-9 (Ion Kroitoru)	WWF, NJPW, SMW, BCW	December 7, 1963	February 21, 2017	Acute pulmonary edema
53	Ricky Gibson (Richard Cain)	GCCW, CWA, NWA Mid-America, NWA, UWF, MACW	November 19, 1952	September 15, 2006	Heart attack
53	Ryuma Go (Hiroshi Yagi)	NJPW, AJPW, IWE, NWA, AWA, WAR	March 23, 1956	October 18, 2009	Blood poisoning
53	Tony Jones	APW, BattlARTS, UPW, WWE, XPW	April 6, 1971	April 11, 2024	Unknown
53	Anton Koolmann	N/A	September 11, 1899	June 29, 1953	Unknown
53	Henry Kulky	NWA, Various International Promotions	August 11, 1911	February 12, 1965	Heart attack
53	Buddy Landel (William Ensor)	NWA, WCW, MACW, SMW, USWA, WWF	August 14, 1961	June 22, 2015	Injuries from a car accident
53	Danny Little Bear	NWA, Stampede Wrestling, CSW, GCCW	September 13, 1937	May 12, 1991	Liver cancer
53	Curly Moe (Donald Zalesky)	IWCCW	April 3, 1962	July 1, 2015	Unknown
53	Osamu Nishimura	NJPW, AJPW, ECW, various Japanese and International promotions	September 23, 1971	February 28, 2025	Esophageal cancer
53	Larry O'Dea (Larry Davies)	WCW Australia, CWF, AJPW	1944	June 30, 1997	Liver cancer
53	Johnny Rougeau	IWA Montreal, BTW, NWA, ASW	June 9, 1929	May 25, 1983	Cancer
53	Frank Scarpa	Big Time Wrestling (Boston), NWA, various promotions in Canada	September 28, 1915	January 25, 1969	Heart attack (during match)
53	Mike Shaw	Stampede Wrestling, WCW, WWF	May 9, 1957	September 11, 2010	Heart attack
53	Silver Cat (Antonio Hernández Herrada)	CMLL, AAA, various Mexican promotions	April 8, 1970	March 29, 2024	Unknown
53	Ski Hi Lee (Robert Leedy)	Stampede Wrestling, NWA, Joint Promotions	February 9, 1921	May 31, 1974	Believed to be acromegaly
53	Ken Timbs	MACW, GCW, EMLL, CSW, CWF	January 27, 1951	August 1, 2004	Cardiomyopathy and congestive heart failure
53–54	Taro Miyake	N/A	August 15, 1881	1935	Unknown
54	Akebono (Chadwick Haheo Rowan)	WWE, AJPW, NJPW, Hustle, Zero 1, various Japanese promotions	May 8, 1969	April 11, 2024	heart failure
54	Ted Allen (Ted Allen Lipscomb)	GCW, Mid-South Wrestling, CWA, SMW, Independent Circuit	November 17, 1955	August 19, 2010	Heart attack
54	Angel of Death (David Sheldon)	Stampede Wrestling, UWF, GWF, WCW	July 20, 1953	November 25, 2007	Unknown
54	Awesome Kong (Dwayne McCullough)	WCW, GWF, USWA, Independent Circuit	January 5, 1958	November 17, 2012	Heart attack
54	Black Warrior (Jesus Toral López)	CMLL, UWA, AAA	January 7, 1969	January 10, 2023	Unknown
54	Josephine Blatt	N/A	1869	September 1, 1923	Unknown
54	Jonathan Boyd (Jonathan Barry Boyle)	WCW Australia, NWA, PNW, CWA	October 21, 1944	August 7, 1999	Heart attack
54	Crybaby Waldo (Walt McDonald)	ECW, NWA, IPWA, independent circuit	April 21, 1966	July 28, 2020	Heart attack
54	Lionel Conacher	wrestled only in Canada	May 24, 1900	May 26, 1954	Heart attack
54	Droz (Darren Drozdov)	WWF, ECW	April 7, 1969	June 30, 2023	Natural causes
54	Bob Fitzsimmons	N/A	May 26, 1863	October 22, 1917	Pneumonia
54	Dory Funk, Sr.	WSS, NWA, AWA, NWA St. Louis, WWWF	May 4, 1919	June 3, 1973	Heart attack
54	Karloff Lagarde Jr. (César Baltazar de Lucio Valencia)	CMLL, UWA, AAA	October 21, 1970	December 13, 2024	
54	Jos LeDuc (Michel Pigeon)	NWA, Lutte Internationale, AWA, WWF, CWA, CWF, GCW	August 30, 1944	May 1, 1999	Lung infection
54	Arvo Lindén	N/A	February 27, 1887	March 18, 1941	Unknown
54	Benny McCrary	NWA, NJPW	December 7, 1946	March 26, 2001	Heart attack
54	Yoshihiro Momota	AJPW	March 15, 1946	November 22, 2000	Liver failure
54	Väinö Myllyrinne	wrestled in Europe	February 27, 1909	April 13, 1963	Acromegaly
54	La Parka II (Jesús Alfonso Huerta Escoboza)	AAA, IWRG, DDT Pro-Wrestling, wrestled in various promotions in Mexico	January 4, 1966	January 11, 2020	Lung and kidney failure
54	Puppet the Psycho Dwarf (Stevie Lee)	TNA, WWA, Independent Circuit	1966	September 9, 2020	Unknown
54	George de Relwyskow	Joint Promotions	June 18, 1887	November 9, 1942	Unknown
54	Tommy Rogers (Thomas Couch)	UWF, NWA, AJPW, WCW, WWF, ECW	May 14, 1961	June 1, 2015	Unknown
54	Rico Suave (Julio Domingo Estrada Caceres)	WWC, BJW	July 4, 1970	March 20, 2025	Heart failure
54	The Ultimate Warrior (James Hellwig)	WWF, CWA, WCWA, WCW	June 16, 1959	April 8, 2014	Heart attack
54	Uncle Elmer (Stan Fraizer)	CWA, NWA, GCCW, WWF, USWA	August 16, 1937	July 1, 1992	Diabetes
54	Pez Whatley	CWF, NWA, WWF, WCW	January 10, 1951	January 18, 2005	Heart attack
54–55	Hergeleci İbrahim (Ibrahim Mahmut)	wrestled only in Turkey	1862	1917	Unknown
55	Matt Borne (Matthew Osborne)	PNW, WCCW, UWF, WWF, WCW, ECW	July 27, 1957	June 28, 2013	Drug overdose (possible heart failure)
55	Danie Brits	WWP, various promotions in South Africa	March 3, 1965	September 3, 2020	Heart attack
55	Haystacks Calhoun (William Dee Calhoun)	WWWF, NWA	August 3, 1934	December 7, 1989	Diabetes
55	Chief Little Eagle (Richard Thomas Bryant)	NWA, GCW, NWA Gulf Coast, CWC	March 21, 1935	July 7, 1990	Murder
55	Johnny Lee Clary	NWF	June 18, 1959	October 21, 2014	Heart attack
55	Eddie Graham (Edward Gossett)	WWWF, CWF, NWA	January 15, 1930	January 21, 1985	Multiple gunshot suicide
55	Rumi Kazama	AJW, JWP, LLPW, DDT, WAR	November 28, 1965	September 21, 2021	Endometriosis
55	Koji Kitao	SWS, NJPW, WWF, WAR	August 12, 1963	February 10, 2019	Kidney disease
55	MS-1 (Pablo Fuentes Reyna)	CMLL, AAA, UWA	December 31, 1956	January 12, 2012	Car crash
55	Mantaur (Mike Halac)	WWF, ECW, CWA, USWA	May 14, 1968	July 11, 2023	Diabetes
55	Tony Matisi	N/A	August 23, 1914	August 26, 1969	Illness
55	Hans Nijman (Johannes Nijman)	Fighting Network Rings	September 23, 1959	November 5, 2014	Murder
55	Bull Ortega (Jesus Ortega)	Stampede Wrestling, NWA, WWWF, MLW, NWA Detroit	May 12, 1922	July 28, 1977	Heart attack
55	Antonio Peña (Antonio Herrada)	founder of AAA, CMLL	June 13, 1951	October 5, 2006	Heart attack
55	Antonino Rocca (Antonino Biasetton)	WWWF, NWA	April 13, 1921	March 15, 1977	Urinary tract infection
55	Universo 2000 (Andrés Reyes González)	CMLL, AAA, IWRG	April 18, 1963	May 1, 2018	Heart problems
55	Diane Von Hoffman (Phyllis Burch)	USWA, CWA, LPWA, LMLW	April 13, 1962	July 6, 2017	Complications from knee surgery
55	Timothy Well (Timothy Smith)	AJPW, USWA, WWF, WCW, ECW	September 8, 1961	January 9, 2017	Kidney failure
55	Chris Youngblood (Christopher Romero)	WCCW, WWC, WCW, AJPW, USWA, FMW	February 10, 1966	July 7, 2021	Believed to be liver and kidney failure
55-56	Kurt Zehe	various European promotions, Joint Promotions	January 12, 1913	1969	Unknown
56	Brad Batten	NWA, CSW, ACCW, SMW, WWC, SSW	September 8, 1958	November 18, 2014	Heart attack
56	Edwin Bibby	N/A	November 15, 1848	May 5, 1905	Rheumatism
56	Paul Bunyan (Max Palmer)	NWA Mid-America, NWF	November 27, 1927	May 17, 1984	Heart disease
56	Emilio Charles Jr. (Sergio Garduño)	CMLL	October 12, 1956	December 28, 2012	Kidney failure
56	Espanto III (Miguel Vázquez Bernal)	EMLL	February 11, 1940	December 8, 1996	Heart attack
56	Bill Fralic	WWF	October 31, 1962	December 13, 2018	Cancer
56	Steve Gillespie	WFWA, Stampede Wrestling, FMW, WWF, CNWA, Onita Pro	July 22, 1963	January 18, 2020	Heart attack
56	Babe the Farmer's Daughter (Ursula Hayden)	GLOW	March 8, 1966	December 3, 2022	Cancer
56	Walter Johnson	NWA, BTW, WCCW	November 13, 1942	June 29, 1999	Heart attack
56	Cowboy Lang (Harry Lang)	NWA, WWF, AWA	August 28, 1950	January 4, 2007	Heart disease
56	Steve Lawler (Steve Gower)	SCW, DSW, TCW, Independent Circuit	January 24, 1965	September 2, 2021	COVID-19
56	Maurice Letchford	wrestled in the US, Canada, UK, and South Africa	August 27, 1908	August 15, 1965	Unknown
56	Blimp Levy (Martin Levy)	NWA	April 30, 1905	November 8, 1961	Believed to be complications from obesity
56	Dave McKigney	MLW, WWWF, NWA, NJPW, NWA Detroit, Big Bear Promotions	June 9, 1932	July 4, 1988	Car crash
56	Moondog King (Edward White)	WWF, Lutte Internationale	May 18, 1949	August 26, 2005	Injuries from a car accident and health issues
56	Max Muscle (John Czawlytko)	WCW, USWA, GWF, MCW, XPW	February 22, 1963	June 27, 2019	Unknown
56	Yvon Robert	NWA, Montreal, MLW	October 8, 1914	July 12, 1971	Heart attack
56	Garry Robbins	CNWA, GWF, NJPW, WWC, Indo-Asian Wrestling	September 9, 1957	December 11, 2013	Heart attack
56	Ben Roller	N/A	July 1, 1876	April 19, 1933	Pneumonia
56	Buddy Rose (Paul Perschmann)	AWA, PNW, WWF	November 27, 1952	April 28, 2009	Natural causes from obesity; diabetes complications
56	Kurt Von Hess (William Terry)	NWA, Lutte Internationale, All-Star, Maple Leaf Wrestling, NJPW, WWF	April 10, 1942	March 13, 1999	Heart attack
56–57	Black Guzmán (Miguel Guzman Huerta)	CMLL, NWA	1916	December 1, 1973	Unknown
57	Jerry Balisok	GCW, CWF	September 8, 1955	April 18, 2013	Heart attack
57	Fred Beell	N/A	January 17, 1876	August 5, 1933	Shot
57	Brazo de Oro (Jesús Alvarado Nieves)	CMLL, WWA, UWA, NWA Los Angeles	October 7, 1959	April 28, 2017	Heart attack
57	Brick Bronsky (Jeffrey Beltzner)	Stampede Wrestling, Independent circuit	April 18, 1964	August 23, 2021	COVID-19
57	Brickhouse Brown (Frederick Seawright)	UWF Mid-South, NWA, WWF, CWA, USWA	August 11, 1960	July 29, 2018	Prostate cancer
57	Chris Champion (Christopher Ashford-Smith)	WCW, MACW, CWA, CWF, USWA	February 17, 1961	August 22, 2018	Presumed to be a stroke
57	Al Green (Alfred Dobalo)	WCW, WCPW, CWF, AJPW, CWA	October 15, 1955	June 14, 2013	Chronic obstructive pulmonary disease
57	The Grand Wizard (Ernie Roth)	NWA, WWWF/WWF	August 30, 1926	October 12, 1983	Heart attack
57	Betty Jo Hawkins (Elizabeth Floyd)	NWA, CWF, Stampede Wrestling	October 22, 1930	December 4, 1987	Heart attack
57	Samson Kutsuwada (Tomotsugu Kutsuwada)	JWA, AJPW	May 1, 1947	October 12, 2004	Leukemia
57	Masakre (Aristóteles Radamés Coccó Flores)	CMLL, AAA	May 13, 1954	April 12, 2012	Spinal cancer
57	Akram Pahalwan	Joint Promotions. wrestled in India, Pakistan, and various international promotions	1930	April 12, 1987	Unknown
57	Zoogz Rift (Robert Pawlikowski)	UWF	July 10, 1953	March 22, 2011	Complications from diabetes
57	Bert Ruby (Bertalan Rubinstein)	NWA, promoter for NWA Detroit	November 29, 1910	March 9, 1968	Heart attack
57	Paddy Ryan (Earl Patrick Freeman)	Stampede Wrestling, PNW, NWA All-Star Wrestling	August 23, 1932	December 28, 1989	Heart attack
57	Bart Sawyer (Steven Stewart)	PNW, NWA, WCW, USWA, ECCW, W*ING	November 30, 1965	September 12, 2023	Unknown
57	Mark Tendler	WWWF, NWA Hawaii, NWA, AJPW	March 4, 1932	February 15, 1990	Murder by Gunshot
57	Shag Thomas (James Thomas)	Stampede Wrestling, NWA, PNW	August 11, 1924	July 25, 1982	Heart attack
57	Don Vines	Joint Promotions	February 6, 1932	September 17, 1989	Unknown
57	Fez Whatley (Todd Hillier)	World Championship Wrestling	March 31, 1964	August 14, 2021	Heart failure
57-58	Hunter Q. Robbins III (Robin Hunt)	ECW, MEWF, independent circuit	1967	January 11, 2025	Unknown
58	Gran Apache (Mario Balbuena González)	CMLL, AAA, IWA Japan	April 16, 1959	May 7, 2017	Intestinal cancer
58	Paul Bearer (William Moody)	WWF, CWF, WCCW, USWA, TNA	April 10, 1954	March 5, 2013	Heart attack
58	Brazo de Plata (José Luis Alvarado Nieves)	CMLL, AAA, WWE, WWA, UWA, IWRG	March 19, 1963	July 26, 2021	Heart attack
58	Bulldog Bob Brown	NWA, Stampede Wrestling, AWA, All-Star, NWA St. Louis, CSW	October 16, 1938	February 5, 1997	Heart attack
58	Chuck Coates	WCW, WWF, WWC, SAPW, independent circuit	August 13, 1967	September 8, 2025	Heart failure
58	Ripper Collins (Roy Lee Albern)	NWA Hawaii, AWA, GCCW, Stampede Wrestling	October 10, 1933	November 12, 1991	Melanoma
58	Adam Forepaugh	N/A	February 28, 1831	January 22, 1890	Complications from 1889–1890 pandemic
58	Giant Gustav	NWA, NJPW, IWCCW	April 13, 1961	October 6, 2019	Heart Attack
58	Tarzan Goto (Seijo Goto)	AJPW, FMW, NWA, CWA, ECW, IWA Japan	August 16, 1963	May 29, 2022	Liver cancer
58	Kevin Greene	WCW	July 31, 1962	December 21, 2020	Heart attack
58	Helen Hild (Gladys Helen Nevins)	NWA, WWWF	February 26, 1926	March 4, 1984	Lung infection
58	Ice Train (Harold Hogue)	WCW, CWA	November 13, 1965	January 23, 2024	Unknown
58	Mo (Robert Horne)	WWF, USWA	April 13, 1967	October 19, 2025	Blood Infection and pneumonia
58	Tank Morgan (Paul McManus)	WWWF, NWA, IWE, NWA Hawaii, UWF	April 18, 1933	August 15, 1991	Murder
58	New Jack (Jerome Young)	ECW, SMW, USWA, TNA, XPW	January 3, 1963	May 14, 2021	Heart attack
58	Don Nakaya Nielsen	NJPW, PWFG	July 8, 1959	August 16, 2017	Heart attack complications from surgery
58	Charles Rigoulot	N/A	November 3, 1903	August 22, 1962	Heart attack
58	Osley Bird Saunooke	N/A	July 19, 1906	April 16, 1965	Unknown
58	Randy Savage (Randall Poffo)	WWF, NWA, ICW, CWA, WCW	November 15, 1952	May 20, 2011	Cardiovascular disease
58	Scorpio Jr. (Rafael Núñez Juan)	CMLL, AAA, UWA, various Mexican Promotions	October 11, 1966	November 7, 2024	
58	Tracy Smothers	CWA, WCW, SMW, WWF, ECW, IWA Mid-South	September 2, 1962	October 28, 2020	Lymphoma
58	George Tragos	NWA	March 14, 1897	September 5, 1955	Unknown
58	Tarzan Tyler (Camille Tourville)	NWA, Lutte Internationale, WWWF, CWF	December 4, 1927	December 24, 1985	Car wreck
58	Larry Winters	ECW, TWA, AWA, NWA, Pro Wrestling USA, NWF	April 14, 1956	January 27, 2015	Heart attack
58-59	Jumbo Baretta (Julio Barrera)	WWF, WCW, CWF, UWF Japan, PWFG	1967	October 25, 2026	
59	Evgeny Artyukhin Sr.	NJPW	June 17, 1949	July 12, 2008	Heart attack during training
59	Shota Chochishvili	NJPW	July 10, 1950	August 27, 2009	Leukemia
59	John Condrone	CCW, NWA, WCW, independent circuit	November 16, 1960	October 20, 2020	COVID-19
59	Douglas Clark	Joint Promotions	May 2, 1891	February 1, 1951	Unknown
59	Espectro I (Antonio Arriaga)	EMLL	February 9, 1934	October 13, 1993	Unknown
59	Angel Gabriele	WWA, PPW	March 21, 1956	February 23, 2016	Unknown
59	René Guajardo (Manuel Guajardo Mejorado)	EMLL, UWA, WCCW, CWA	January 4, 1933	May 11, 1992	Liver cancer
59	Ralph Hammonds	NWA	July 9, 1906	May 5, 1966	Unknown
59	Mickie Henson	referee for WWE, WCW, CWF	January 2, 1963	February 14, 2022	COVID-19
59	Ernie Holmes	GCW, WWF	July 11, 1948	January 17, 2008	Car crash
59	Don Kent (Leo Smith Jr.)	NWA, WWWF, NWA Mid-America, CWF	June 24, 1933	June 7, 1993	Leukemia
59	Evan "Strangler" Lewis	N/A	May 24, 1860	November 9, 1919	Cancer
59	Dutch Mantell (Alfred Albert Joe de Re la Gardiur)	N/A	July 25, 1881	January 31, 1941	Cancer
59	Mike Marino (Michael Harrison)	Joint Promotions	October 8, 1921	August 24, 1981	Leukemia
59	Drew McDonald (Charles Shaw)	All Star Wrestling, Stampede Wrestling, CWA	June 16, 1955	February 9, 2015	Cancer
59	Jerry Monti (Gerald Monti)	NWA San Francisco, NWA, AWA, WWF	January 2, 1940	December 3, 1999	Cancer
59	Matthew Saad Muhammad	UWFi	August 5, 1954	May 25, 2014	Lou Gehrig's disease
59	Charlie Norris	WCW, PWA, independent circuit	October 21, 1963	February 6, 2023	Unknown
59	Tony Parisi (Antonio Pugliese)	WWWF, NWA, Lutte Internationale, MLW	January 22, 1941	August 19, 2000	Heart attack
59	The Patriot (Del Wilkes)	AWA, WCW, WWF, GWF, AJPW	December 21, 1961	July 1, 2021	Heart attack
59	Eddie Quinn	promoter for wrestling in Montreal, NWA St. Louis	May 22, 1906	December 14, 1965	Cerebral hemorrhage
59	Mangla Rai (Mahamalla Rai)	Wrestled only in India	October 1916	June 24, 1976	Multiple organ failure
59	Tex Rickard (George Rickard)	promoter for wrestling in New York City	January 2, 1870	January 6, 1929	Appendicitis
59	Eddie Sullivan (Ruben Joe Huizar)	NWA, GCCW, NWA Mid-America, WWWF, AWA, and various promotions in Japan	June 8, 1941	November 24, 2000	Stroke or Heart attack
59	John L. Sullivan	N/A	October 15, 1858	February 2, 1918	Heart disease
59	Skip Young (Galton Young)	WCCW, NWA, CWF, USWA, WWC	July 24, 1951	December 3, 2010	Unknown
59	Super Muñeco (Hebert Palafox)	AAA, WWA, CMLL/EMLL, various promotions in Mexico	April 10, 1962	February 9, 2022	Unknown
59	Don West	TNA	June 20, 1963	December 30, 2022	Lymphoma
59	Tom Zenk	AWA, WWF, Lutte Internationale, WCW, AJPW	November 30, 1958	December 9, 2017	Heart attack from atherosclerosis and cardiomegaly

=== Under 65 ===
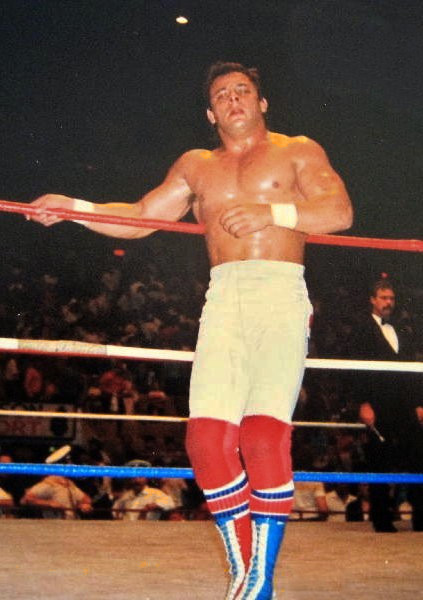
Dynamite Kid

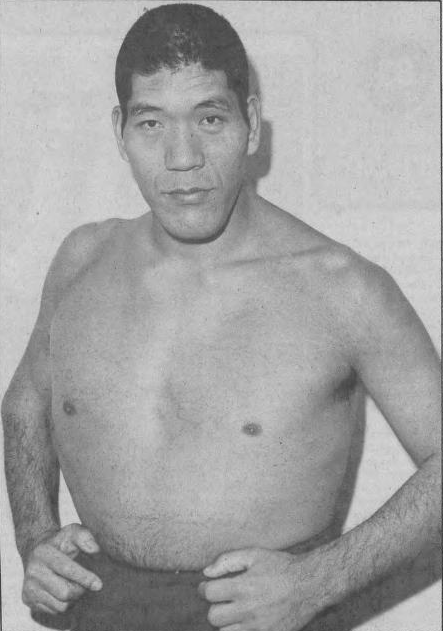
Giant Baba

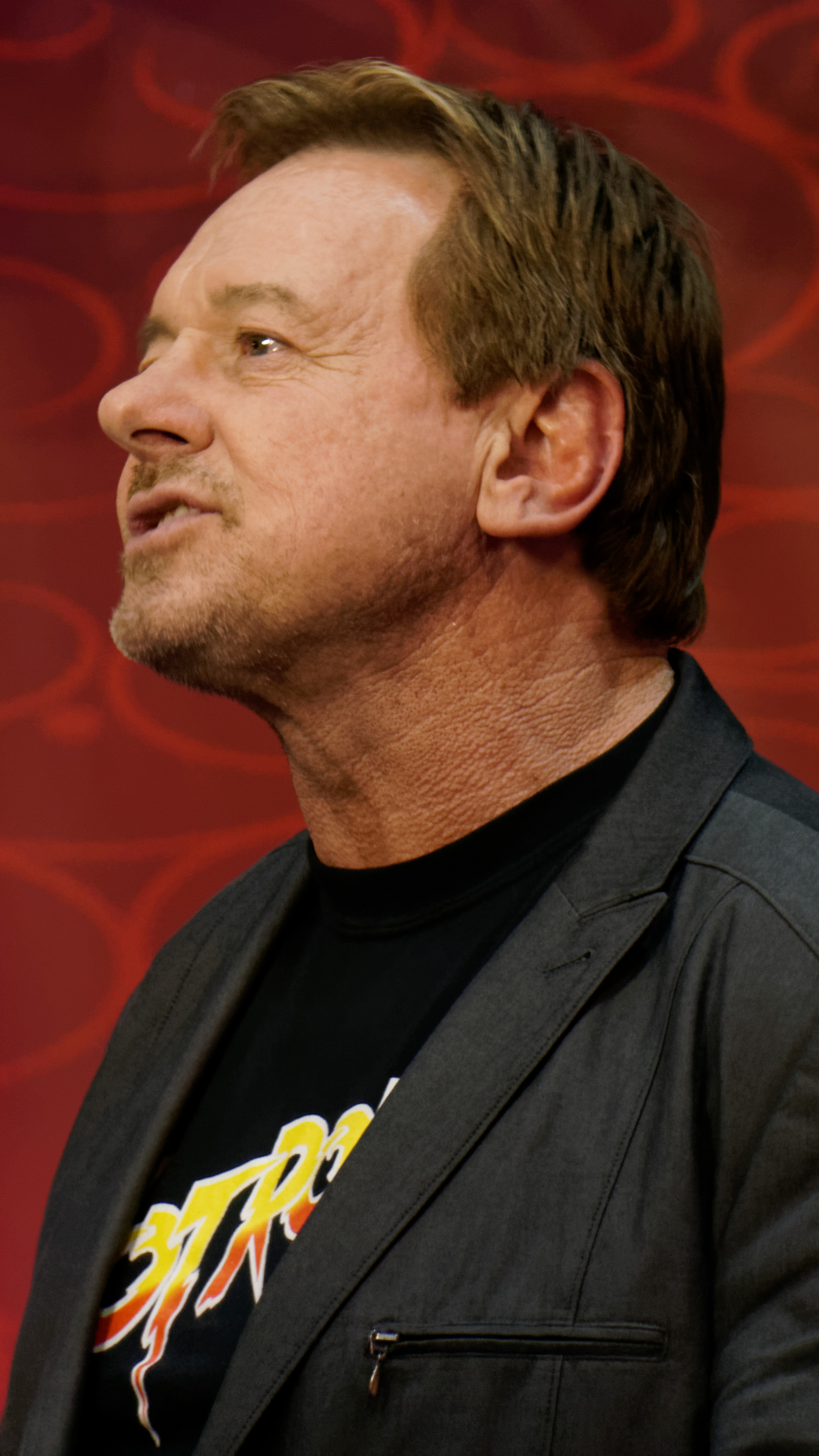
Roddy Piper

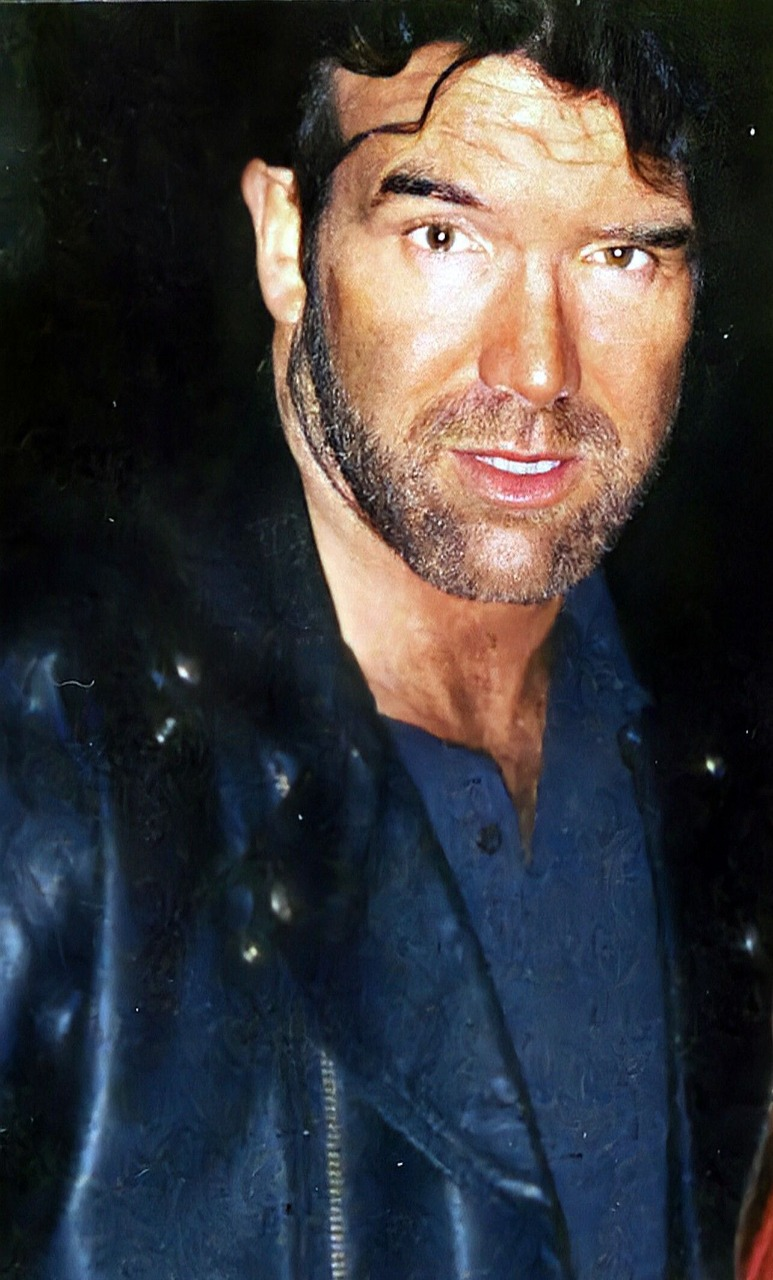
Scott Hall

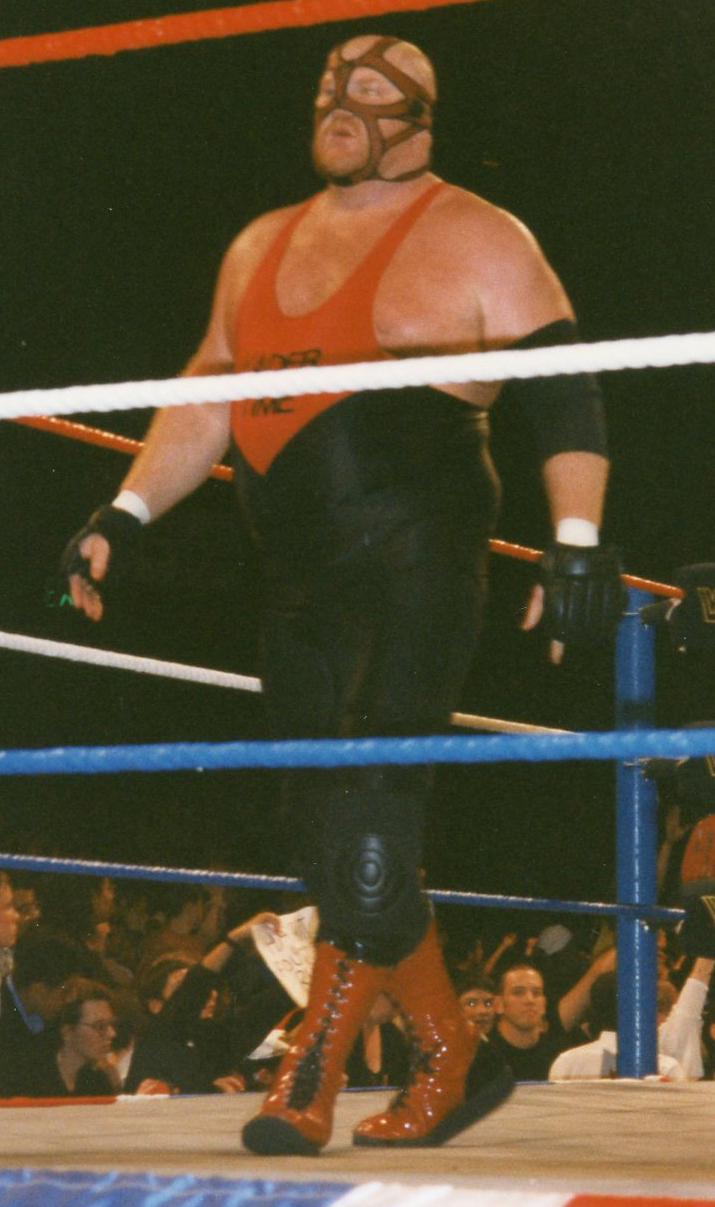
Big Van Vader

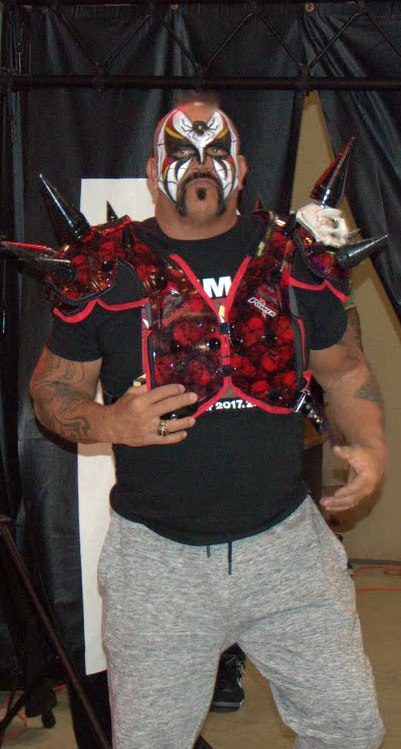
Road Warrior Animal

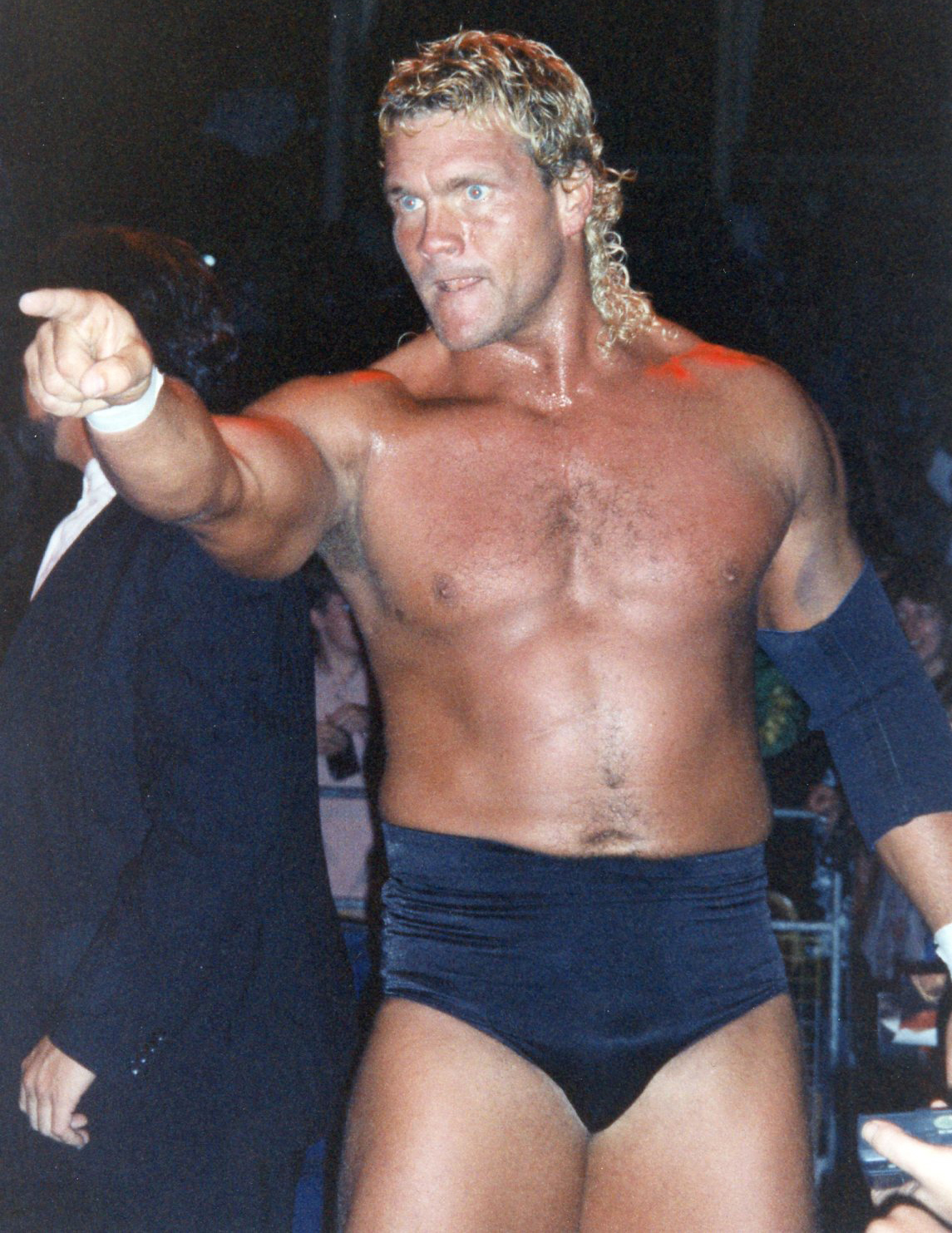
Sid Eudy

Age	Ring name (Birth name)	Promotion(s) worked for	Date of birth	Date of death	Cause of death
60	Dieusel Berto	PWFG, RINGS, Battlarts	March 24, 1958	December 29, 2018	Illness
60	Bearcat Brown (Matt Jewell)	NWA Mid-America, NWA, NWA Gulf Coast, CWF, CWA	August 31, 1935	April 7, 1996	Unknown
60	Jay Clayton (Jay Clayton Smith)	NWA, NWA Tri-State	July 23, 1941	December 25, 2005	Blood Clot in the brain
60	Dynamite Kid (Thomas Billington)	WWF, Stampede Wrestling, Joint Promotions, ASW, NJPW, AJPW	December 5, 1958	December 5, 2018	Unconfirmed, but had long-term health issues including stroke
60	Steve Gatorwolf (Steve Ketcher)	WWF, AJPW, independent circuit	September 20, 1957	2017	Heart attack
60	Rufus R. Jones (Carey Lloyd)	CSW, NWA St. Louis, NWA, MACW, AWA, AJPW	July 4, 1933	November 13, 1993	Heart attack
60	Mosco de la Merced (Juan Valdez Valentino)	UWA, AAA	June 23, 1964	August 19, 2024	Unknown
60	Mountain Fiji (Emily Dole)	GLOW	September 28, 1957	January 2, 2018	Natural causes from years of health issues
60	Takashi Okamura	WAR, PWFG, Toryumon (Último Dragón), Dragongate	September 4, 1964	April 25, 2025	Illness
60	Princess Jasmine (Cynthia Peretti)	GLOW, AWA, POWW	June 2, 1948	May 8, 2009	Cancer
60	Road Warrior Animal (Joseph Laurinaitis)	NWA, Lutte Internationale, AWA, MACW, WWF/E, WCW, AJPW, TNA	September 12, 1960	September 22, 2020	Heart attack
60	Stan Stasiak (George Stipich)	PNW, Stampede Wrestling, WWWF, NWA	April 13, 1937	June 19, 1997	Heart failure
60	Ray Stevens (Carl Stevens)	BTW SF, AWA, NWA, WWWF/WWF, CWF	September 5, 1935	May 3, 1996	Heart attack
60	John Witte	NWA, Stampede Wrestling, PNW	January 29, 1933	March 13, 1993	Leukemia
60	Yamaguchi-san (Yusuke Yamaguchi)	AJPW, FMW, WWF, Michinoku Pro Wrestling, ULL	May 5, 1958	March 9, 2019	Stroke
60–61	Eduardo Perez	CWF, NWA, CCW	1928	September 7, 1989	Unknown
61	Jimmy Abbott	various promotions in South Africa	May 11, 1959	March 21, 2021	Heart attack
61	Giant Baba (Shohei Baba)	JWA, AJPW, NWA, WWWF	January 23, 1938	January 31, 1999	Colon cancer
61	Butcher Brannigan (Joseph Novo)	WCW Australia, CWF, WWWF, Stampede Wrestling, NWA	September 3, 1948	September 7, 2009	Kidney failure and heart disease
61	Cocoa Samoa (Ulualoaiga Emelio)	ASW, CWF, PNW, CWA	March 9, 1945	January 9, 2007	Unknown
61	Terry Garvin (Terry Joyal)	GCCW, IWA Montreal, CSW, NWA, MACW, WWF	March 1, 1937	August 17, 1998	Cancer
61	Mike Graham (Michael Gossett)	CWF, NWA, AWA, WCW	September 22, 1951	October 19, 2012	Suicide by gunshot while intoxicated
61	Killer Karl Krupp (George Momberg)	ESA, GPW, WCCW, MLW, NJPW, CWA	May 13, 1934	August 24, 1995	Hepatitis
61	Little Beaver (Lionel Giroux)	Lutte Internationale, WWWF/WWF, MLW, AWA, NWA	April 18, 1934	December 4, 1995	Emphysema
61	Boris Malenko (Larry Simon)	CWF, WWWF, CWC, MACW, NWA, NJPW	June 28, 1933	September 1, 1994	Leukemia
61	Bubba Monroe (Quentin Bell)	CWA, TASW, GWF, independent circuit	October 23, 1960	September 10, 2022	Unknown
61	Roddy Piper (Roderick Toombs)	AWA, PNW, GCW, MLW, WWF, WCW	April 17, 1954	July 31, 2015	Heart attack from pulmonary embolism
61	Goldie Rogers (David Sherwin)	ASW, MLW, Stampede Wrestling, WWF	August 5, 1950	July 20, 2012	Heart attack
61	Sabu (Terry Brunk)	ECW, WWE, FMW, WCW, TNA	December 12, 1963	May 11, 2025	Heart Attack
61	Sapphire (Juanita Wright)	WWF, USWA	October 24, 1934	September 11, 1996	Heart attack
61	Eddy Steinblock (Edwin Steinblock)	CWA, VDB, owner of European Wrestling Federation, various German promotions	December 16, 1955	November 9, 2017	Unknown Illness
61–62	Peter Fatouros	wrestled in Australia	1891	1953	Unknown
61–62	Metal Maniac (Jeffery Miller)	ECW, MEWF, independent circuit	1964	October 3, 2026	Pancreatic cancer
62	Frank Andersson	NJPW, WCW	May 9, 1956	September 9, 2018	Heart failure
62	Le Petit Prince (Daniel Dubail)	FFCP	September 25, 1943	December 17, 2005	Unknown
62	Luke Brown (Carl Campbell)	AWA, WWWF, NWA, CSW	July 28, 1935	November 12, 1997	Stroke
62	Hank Bruder	N/A	November 22, 1907	June 29, 1970	Unknown
62	Crybaby Cannon (George McCarther)	NWA, Lutte Internationale, AWA, WWWF, MLW, BTW	March 28, 1932	July 1, 1994	Cancer
62	Mocho Cota (Manuel Cota Soto)	EMLL/CMLL	June 5, 1954	December 22, 2016	Brain aneurysm
62	Bobby Eaton	CWA, NWA Mid-America, UWF Mid-South, WCCW, MACW, WCW	August 14, 1958	August 4, 2021	Unknown (found dead in sleep)
62	Gorilla Monsoon (Robert Marella)	WWWF/WWF, NWA, WCW Australia	June 4, 1937	October 6, 1999	Heart failure
62	Jerry Grey	MACW, CWF, WWF, UWF Mid-South, NJPW	July 9, 1963	May 25, 2026	Cancer
62	Oliver Humperdink (John Sutton)	MACW, CWF, WWF, WCW	January 16, 1949	March 20, 2011	Complications from pneumonia and cancer
62	Dr. Karonte (Miguel Urive)	EMLL/CMLL	February 14, 1957	August 26, 2019	Unknown
62	Scott LeDoux (Alan LeDoux)	AWA	January 7, 1949	August 11, 2011	Lou Gehrig's disease
62	Tommy Lister Jr.	WWF, WWC, WCW	June 24, 1958	December 10, 2020	Hypertensive and atherosclerotic cardiovascular disease
62	Hiro Matsuda (Yasuhiro Kojima)	JWA, CWF, WCW, NWA	July 22, 1937	November 27, 1999	Prostate cancer
62	Mongolian Mauler (Peter Miller)	ASW, WCW, various international promotions	September 2, 1961	January 22, 2024	Years of Health issues
62	Bull Montana (Luigi Montagna)	N/A	May 16, 1887	January 24, 1950	Auto Accident
62	Barry Orton (Randal Berry Orton)	WWF, NWA, ICW, MACW, Stampede Wrestling	May 28, 1958	March 20, 2021	Unknown
62	Ari Romero (Jose Luis Arias Romero)	CMLL, MPW, BJPW	December 20, 1951	December 29, 2013	Liver cancer
62	Ron Slinker (David Slinker)	CWF, NWA, IWCCW, UWF	October 30, 1945	March 28, 2008	Liver failure from years of alcoholism
62	Moondog Spike (William Smithson)	CWA, USWA, AJPW, W*ING	May 31, 1950	March 21, 2013	Unknown
62	Thunder Sugiyama (Tsuneharu Sugiyama)	JWA, AJPW, NJPW, IWE, NWA	July 23, 1940	November 22, 2002	Unknown
62	Villano V (Raymundo Díaz Mendoza Jr.)	WCW, CMLL, UWA, AAA	March 22, 1962	August 29, 2024	Unknown
62	Tadao Yasuda	NJPW, Zero1, Hustle, various Japanese promotions	October 9, 1963	February 8, 2026	To Be Determined
63	Mamdouh Farag	CWA (Germany), promotions in Egypt	August 16, 1951	August 16, 2014	Illness
63	Big Van Vader (Leon White)	WCW, WWF, AWA, NJPW, AJPW, Pro Wrestling NOAH	May 14, 1955	June 18, 2018	Heart problems
63	Rusty Brooks (Kurt Koski)	WWF, UWF, FOW, various promotions in Florida	February 8, 1958	February 11, 2021	Health issues
63	Brute Bernard (James Prudhomme)	WWWF, NWA, WCW	June 6, 1921	July 14, 1984	Accidental gunshot wound
63	Bulldog Brower (Richard Gland)	MLW, NWA, WWWF/WWF, NWF	September 17, 1933	September 15, 1997	Complications from hip surgery
63	Bad News Brown (Allen James Coage)	WWF, NJPW, Stampede Wrestling	October 22, 1943	March 6, 2007	Heart attack
63	King Kong Bundy (Christopher Pallies)	WWF, WCCW, NWA, GCW, NJPW, UWF	November 7, 1955	March 4, 2019	Complications from diabetes
63	Big Bully Busick (Nick Busick)	WWF, SCW, GWF	June 1, 1954	May 8, 2018	Cancer in the cerebrospinal fluid
63	Candi Devine (Candace Rummel)	AWA, NWA, CWA, LPWA, USWA, UWF	January 1, 1959	February 9, 2022	Collapsed lung and other health issues
63	Brian Glover	Joint Promotions	April 2, 1934	July 24, 1997	Brain tumor
63	Scott Hall	WWF/WWE, WCW, TNA, NWA, AWA, NJPW	October 20, 1958	March 14, 2022	Multiple heart attacks as a result of complications from hip surgery
63	Wilhelm von Homburg (Norbert Grupe)	N/A	August 25, 1940	March 10, 2004	Prostate cancer
63	S. D. Jones (Conrad Efraim)	WWF, MACW, NWA, NJPW	March 30, 1945	October 26, 2008	Stroke
63	Rob Kaman	Fighting Network Rings	June 5, 1960	March 30, 2024	Blood Clot
63	Kunimatsu Matsunaga	Co-founder and promoter of AJW	August 30, 1941	August 17, 2005	Suicide
63	Wahoo McDaniel (Edward McDaniel)	NWA, MACW, WWWF, WCCW, AWA	June 19, 1938	April 18, 2002	Complications from diabetes and kidney failure
63	Jim Neidhart	WWF, Stampede, WCW, ECW, CWF, NJPW	February 8, 1955	August 13, 2018	Head injury from a fall
63	Bert Prentice	USWA, TNA, SCW, independent circuit	March 26, 1958	August 4, 2021	Cancer
63	Benny Ramírez	NWA, NWA Texas, CSW, IWE, Stampede Wrestling	January 2, 1932	December 20, 1995	Plane crash (American Airlines Flight 965)
63	Ciclón Ramirez (Celso Reyes Daza)	CMLL, IWRG, various Mexican promotions	July 28, 1961	March 4, 2025	Heart attack
63	Savannah Jack (Theodore Russell)	AWA, UWF Mid-South	October 15, 1948	January 17, 2012	Years of cardiomyopathy problems
63	Brett Sawyer (Brett Eugene Woyan)	NWA, PNW, GCW, MACW, WCW	August 10, 1960	September 9, 2023	Unknown
63	Sid Vicious (Sid Eudy)	WCW, WWF, ECW, USWA, CWA	December 16, 1960	August 26, 2024	Cancer
63	Doug Stahl	ECW, NWL, independent circuit	February 25, 1963	July 10, 2026	To Be Determined
63	Crusher Verdu (Oscar Verdu)	WWWF, NWA, Joint Promotions, various European promotions	October 21, 1940	January 2004	Unknown
63	Vivian St. John (Suzanne Miller)	WWWF/WWF, CWF	September 10, 1950	December 20, 2013	Long illness
64	Cousin Luke (Gene Petit)	WWF, AWA, CWF, MACW	May 19, 1949	September 29, 2013	Multiple sclerosis and diabetes
64	Jeff Gaylord	USWA, UWF Mid-South, WCCW, GWF, WWF	October 15, 1958	March 15, 2023	Unknown
64	Solomon Grundy (Tim Hagood)	WCCW, EMLL, AAA	August 10, 1961	December 14, 2025	Heart attack
64	Bobby Jaggers (Robert Jeaudoin)	MACW, NWA, NWA St. Louis, PNW, CWF	January 8, 1948	September 30, 2012	Kidney failure from hepatitis C
64	Teijo Khan (Thomas Kasat)	AWA, CWF, NWA, MACW, PWA	March 24, 1956	April 10, 2020	Unknown
64	Rocky King (William Boulware Jr.)	NWA, MACW, WCW	January 30, 1958	March 27, 2022	Years of health issues
64	Corporal Kirchner (Michael Penzel)	WWF, NJPW, Stampede Wrestling, IWA Japan, W*ING, FMW	September 7, 1957	December 22, 2021	Heart attack
64	Peggy Lee Leather (Peggy Lee Fowler)	WWF, NWA, POWW, AWA, WCW, LPWA, WOW	January 19, 1959	May 22, 2023	Unknown
64	Dale Lewis	AWA, CWF, NWA	August 29, 1933	August 30, 1997	Leukemia
64	Winona Littleheart (Winifred Childree)	CWF, WWWF/WWF, NWA, POWW, WCW (Women's Championship Wrestling)	September 9, 1955	May 9, 2020	Unknown
64	Lizmark (Juan Baños)	EMLL, AAA, CMLL	December 18, 1950	December 16, 2015	Respiratory failure
64	Michael Okpala	promoter in Nigeria, Joint Promotions, and various international promotions	August 8, 1939	March 11, 2004	Illness
64	Iron Mike Sharpe	CWA, ASW, MSWA, WWWA, WWF	October 28, 1951	January 17, 2016	Years of health issues
64	Clem Turner	AWA, WWA, NWA Detroit, NWA St. Louis	May 28, 1945	December 20, 2009	Car crash
64	Lee Wang-pyo	NJPW, AJPW, KWA, TPW, IWE, FMW	June 11, 1954	September 4, 2018	Gallbladder cancer
64	Nikolai Zouev	RINGS	May 20, 1958	May 21, 2022	Heart disease

== See also ==
- List of oldest surviving professional wrestlers
- List of professional wrestling memorial shows
- Ten-bell salute
- Tributes: Remembering Some of the World's Greatest Wrestlers, a book featuring eulogies for professional wrestlers
