= Indian physical culture =

Mallakhamba, a traditional Indian form of yoga done on a pole.

Indian physical culture is the form of physical culture originating in ancient Indian society.

== History ==
=== Ancient era ===
Physical fitness was prized in traditional Hindu thought, with cultivation of the body (dehvada) seen as one path to full self-realization. Buddhist universities such as Nalanda taught various forms of physical culture, such as swimming and archery, with Buddha himself having been well-acquainted with martial activities prior to his enlightenment. Gurukulas focused significantly on physical education alongside academics, with Hindu epics such as the Ramayana often depicting kings marrying off their daughters to men who excelled in athletic events.

A variety of ball games and war-training activities were present in ancient India, with both men and women participating. The traditional Indian physical culture generally used little to no equipment. Ayurvedic medical treatises such as the Charaka Samhita and the Sushruta Samhita emphasized exercise as a way of avoiding conditions such as diabetes, and prescribed exercise in accordance with the seasons. Some specialist communities were known for their acrobatic performances, such as dancing on bamboo.

Hunting for recreation was common through Indian history, and was partaken in by royals; it was done for a variety of reasons, such as proving manliness, for religious purposes, or simply for thrill-seeking purposes. The emphasis on hunting coincided with an overall view of the forest as being an area to be conquered and used by the state, which resulted in conflict between kingdoms and forest-dwellers. Though Hindu scriptures warned against excessive hunting of animals, by the end of the colonial era, some animal species had been hunted to extinction, such as cheetahs. Other exercises done with animals included provoking intoxicated elephants for the purpose of building strength by maneuvering around them and escaping their wrath.

=== Medieval era ===
Wrestling was common in Mughal India, with even the loser of a wrestling bout being awarded some money in order to avoid discouragement. Pehlwani emerged as a fusion of Persian and native Indian wrestling traditions during this time.

=== Colonial era ===
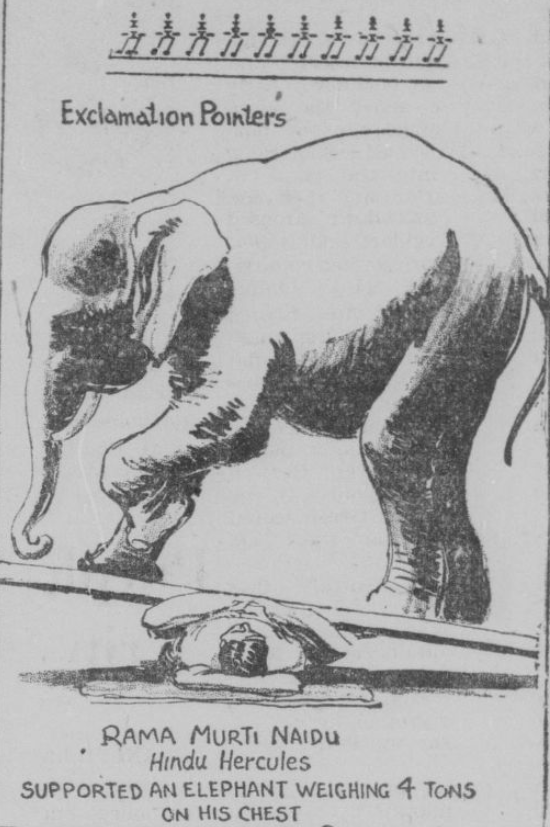
Kodi Rammurthy Naidu was a famous colonial-era strongman who helped counter British accusations of effeminacy among Indian men.

During the colonial era, Indians felt emasculated by the British, who had disarmed and demilitarized Indian society throughout the 19th century. The poverty and starvation of the era reduced Indians' ability to participate in physical exercise. Bengalis became particularly involved in seeking to combat British stereotypes of effeteness by pursuing physical culture and martial arts, with organizations such as the Hindu Mela contributing.

Influences from Western physical culture became prevalent in India, as mediated through influences from groups such as the YMCA, as Indians sought to benefit from the scientific nature and European nationalistic vigor present in Western schools of thought surrounding physical culture at the time. The British sought to impose their standards of physical discipline onto Indians, while discouraging traditional Indian games and negatively depicting Indian physiques. The British also used hunting as a way to establish imperial dominance and protect Indians from attacks by wild animals.

Indians used victory in sport as a method of proving themselves against the colonizer. Indians also sought to standardize and revitalize their native physical culture during this time period, with institutions such as the akharas and vyayamshalas playing a role.

=== Contemporary era ===
Cricket, a British sport introduced into India during the colonial era, has emerged as a major aspect of modern-day India, with success in World Cups and the emergence of the Indian Premier League influencing society.

In 2023, cricket star MS Dhoni invested in a company called Tagda Raho (transl. "stay strong"), which is seeking to revive traditional Indian workouts and which has received significant interest from different groups in the cricket world.

== Relationship with various movements ==
=== Hindu nationalism ===
The Rashtriya Swayamsevak Sangh (RSS) has encouraged loyalty to India as a Hindu country in its followers through the practice of traditional Indian physical culture.

=== Militancy ===
In the colonial era, gyms and other physical culture institutions helped freedom fighters build their strength towards anti-colonial resistance. In the modern era, some communal violence has been linked to Hindu movements that use physical culture to become more organized and strong.

== Influence on the world ==
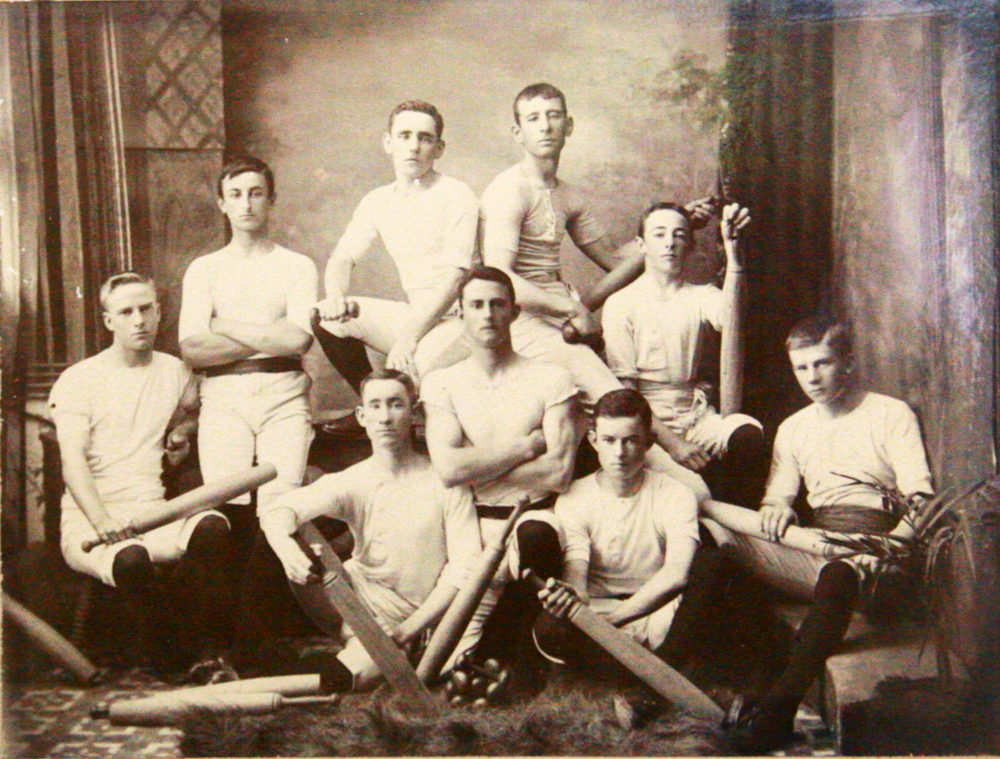
An Indian club swinging team in 1890's England.

Yoga and Indian clubs are among the most globally widespread elements of physical culture originating from India.

== Combat sports ==
=== Archery ===
Dhanurveda describes the practices and uses of archery, bow- and arrow-making, military training, and rules of engagement. The treatise discusses martial arts in relation to the training of warriors, charioteers, cavalry, elephant warriors, infantry etc. It was considered a sin to shoot a warrior in the back and to fight more than one warrior at a time. The bow used in the Vedic period were called danush, and were described in detail in the Vedas. The curved shape of the bow is called vakra in Artha Veda. The bowstring was called jya, and was strung only when needed. An arrow was called an iṣu, and a quiver was called an iṣudhi.

=== Wrestling ===
Wrestling has been popular in India since ancient times, it was mainly an exercise to stay physically fit. The wrestlers, traditionally, use to wear a loincloth, langota. In Ancient India, wrestling was most famously known as Malla-yuddha. One of the protagonists of the Mahabharata, Bhima, was considered to be a great wrestler of his time, with some of his contemporaries including Karna, Jarasandha, Kichaka, and Balarama. The other prominent Indian epic, the Ramayana, also mentions wrestling in India and Hanuman is described as one of the greatest wrestlers of his time. During the reign of Mughal Empire, who were of Turko-Mongol descent, the influence of Iranian and Mongolian wrestling were incorporated to the local Malla-yuddha to form the modern Pehlwani, wrestling style popular throughout India, Pakistan and Bangladesh in modern times.

Wrestling in India is also known as Dangal, and it is the basic form of a wrestling tournament. It is also called kushti in Punjab and Haryana. The wrestling in Punjab and Haryana will take place in a circular court with soft ground which in Punjabi is called an "akharha". Two wrestlers will continue to wrestle until the back of one touches the ground. The winner will parade the court with the loser following him.[10] The wrestlers are called Pehlwans who train with modern weights and traditional weights such as a Gada (mace). The aim of kushti is to wrestle the opponent and to block the other player.

== Physical exercises ==
=== Dand ===
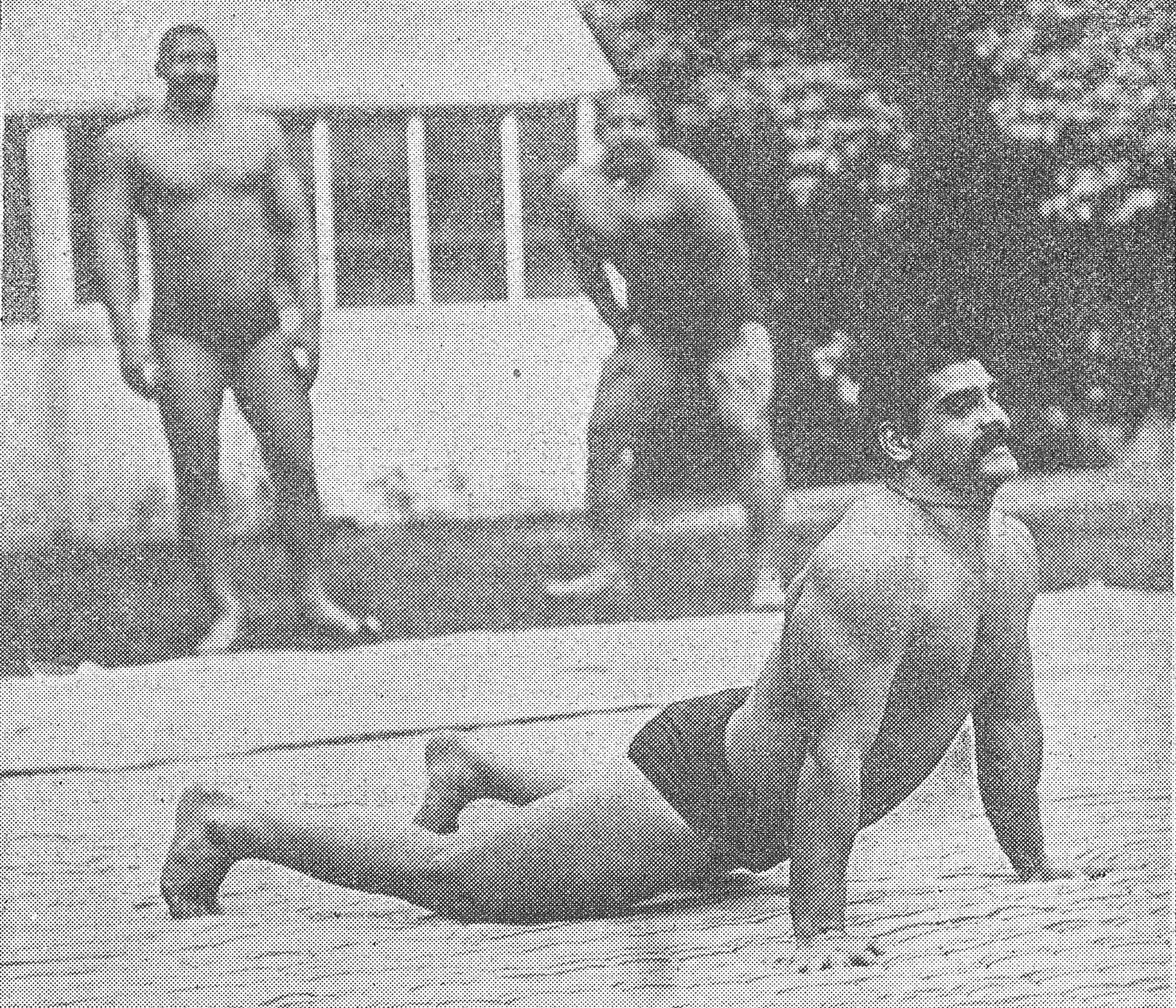
The Great Gama in midst of a Hindu push-up.

The Hindu push-up, also known as dand (Hindi, from Sanskrit दण्ड daṇḍa, "staff"), is a calisthenics exercise which involves performing a push-up while transitioning between the yoga stances known as downward dog and cobra. It is a complex exercise, working abdominals, pectorals, triceps, deltoids, serratus and shoulder girdle.

The technique has a long time association with martial arts and combat sports, having its origin in the ancient wrestling traditions of the Indian subcontinent. It was adopted by Bruce Lee, Karl Gotch and many practitioners of judo and wrestling. It has many names, including rock and roll push-up, judo push-up or as Lee called it, cat stretch.

The Hindu push-up is related to the yogic sequence of Sun Salutation, which also originates in Indian wrestling. It is also associated to another calisthenic exercise of Indian wrestling, the Hindu squat or baithak.

=== Baithak ===
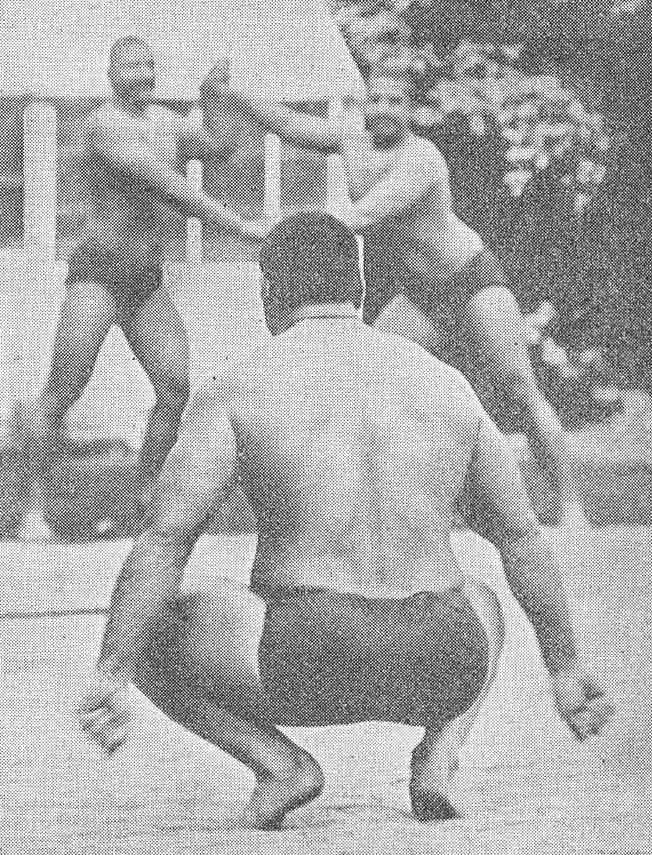
The Great Gama performing a Hindu squat

The Hindu squat, also called baithak or bethak (Hindi, from Sanskrit baiṭhaka, "seat"), is a calisthenics exercise involving a dynamic squat with the knees over the toes. Along with the Hindu push-up, it originated in Indian wrestling and was adopted in martial arts and combat sports by figures such as Bruce Lee and Karl Gotch.

A baithak, also known as a Hindu squat or a deep knee bend on toes, is performed without additional weight and body weight placed on the forefeet and toes with the heels raised throughout; during the movement, the knees track far past the toes. The baithak was a staple exercise of ancient Indian wrestlers. It was also used by Bruce Lee in his training regime. It may also be performed with the hands resting on an upturned club or the back of a chair.

=== Yoga ===
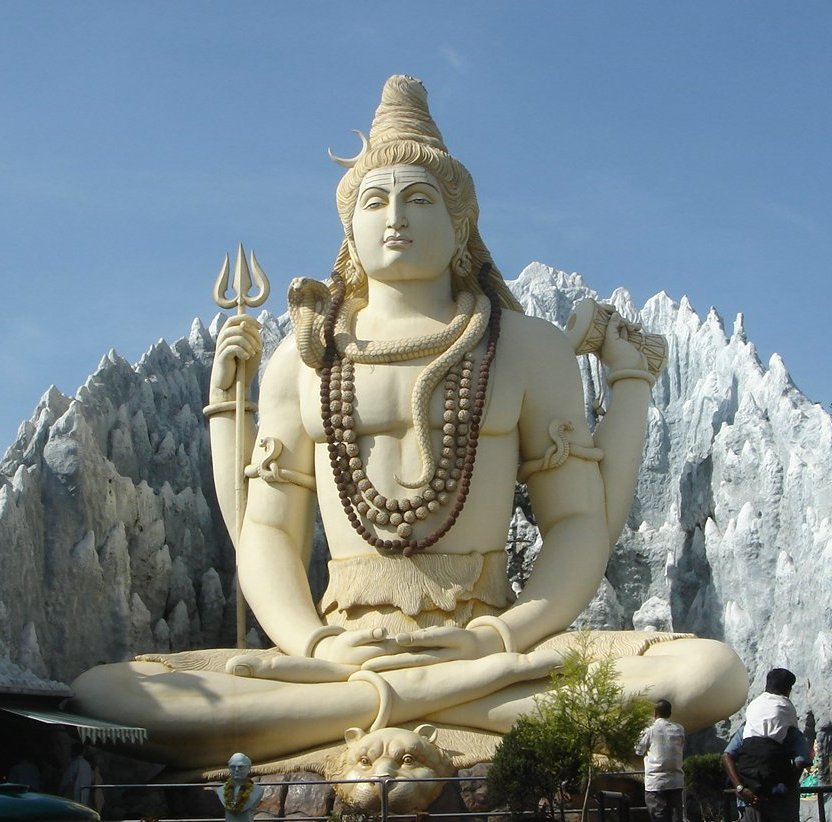
Statue of Shiva performing yoga in the lotus position

Yoga (Note: King (1999, p. 67): "Many westerners see yoga as a variation on the modern concern for health and fitness and a means of overcoming the stresses and strains of modern day living. Most of what passes for yoga in this context, however, bears little relation to traditional practices, institutionalised as they were within established traditions or lienages (sampradaya) of teacher (guru) and pupil (śiṣya), structured according to hierarchical and initiatory stages of development and bound up with an ascetic lifestyle and world-view very different from the concerns of the modern western urbanite.") (UK: /ˈjəʊɡə/, US: /ˈjoʊɡə/; Sanskrit: योग 'yoga' [joːɡɐ]; lit. 'yoke' or 'union') is a group of physical, mental, and spiritual practices or disciplines that originated with its own philosophy in ancient India, aimed at controlling body and mind to attain liberation (moksha), (Note: A classical definition comes from Patanjali's Yoga sutras(Feuerstein 1998, pp. 4–5, White 2011, p. 3, Olsson 2023, p. 2), which defines yoga as aiming to control (yoke) and still the mind (samadhi), recognizing (jnana) or isolating (kaivalya) the Purusha, the primordial witness-consciousness, from Prakriti, matter and mind (Feuerstein 1998, pp. 4–5, Olsson 2023, p. 2). Another classical definition (Feuerstein 1998, pp. 4–5, White 2011, p. 3, Olsson 2023, p. 2), informed by the Bhagavad Gita (Olsson 2023, p. 2) and Vedanta (Feuerstein 1998, pp. 4–5), describes the purpose of yoga as the union of the individual self (jivatman) with the higher Self (paramatman), Brahman, or God (Shiva).) as practiced in the Hindu, Jain, and Buddhist traditions. Modern forms of yoga are practiced worldwide, often mainly for exercise accompanied by other elements like relaxation.

== Exercise equipment ==
=== Gada ===
The gada is one of the traditional pieces of training equipment in Hindu physical culture, and is common in the akhara of north India. Maces of various weights and heights are used depending on the strength and skill level of the practitioner. It is believed that Lord Hanuman's gada was the largest amongst all the gadas in the world. For training purposes, one or two wooden gada (mudgar) are swung behind the back in several different ways and is particularly useful for building grip strength and shoulder endurance. The Great Gama was known for extensive use of gada. Winners in a kushti contest are often awarded with a gada.

=== Indian club ===
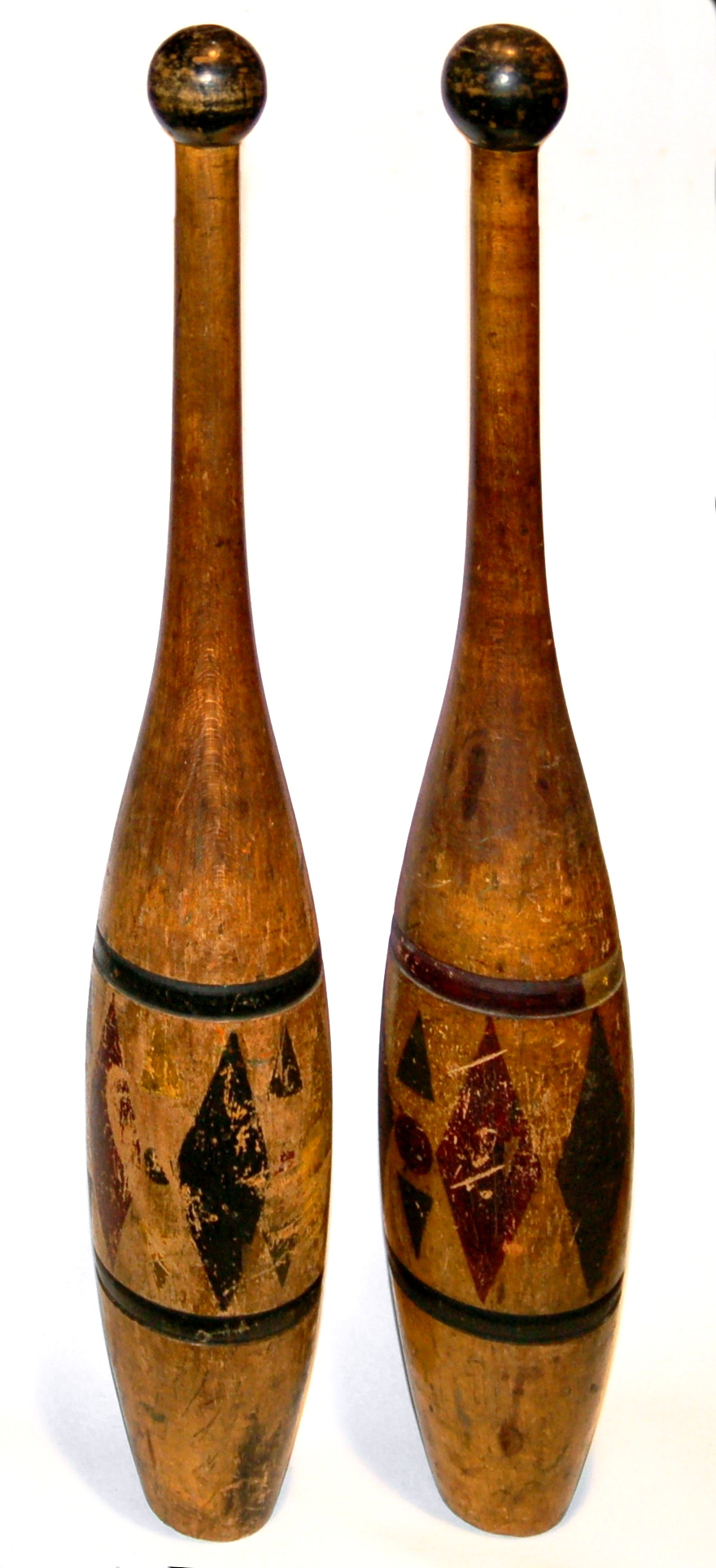
A pair of painted Indian clubs from the late 19th century as used in rhythmic gymnastics

Indian clubs (Sanskrit: मुद्गर, romanized: mudgara), known in Iran as meels (Persian: میل, romanized: mil), are a type of exercise equipment used to present resistance in movement to develop strength and mobility. They consist of juggling pin-shaped wooden clubs of varying sizes and weights, which are swung in certain patterns as part of a strength exercise program. They can range in weight from a few kilograms each to as much as 50 kg. They were used in carefully choreographed routines in which the clubs were swung in unison by a group of exercisers, led by an instructor,‌ the way it is still practiced in Varzesh-e Bastani in Iran and similar to 21st-century aerobics classes. The routines would vary according to the group's ability along with the weights of the clubs being used. When the 19th-century British colonists came across exercising clubs in India, they named them Indian clubs.

== See also ==
- Sport in South Asia

== Sources ==
- Bowker, John (2000). The Concise Oxford Dictionary of World Religions. Oxford University Press.
- Carmody, Denise Lardner; Carmody, John (1996). Serene Compassion. Oxford University Press US.
- Feuerstein, Georg (1998). The Yoga Tradition: Its History, Literature, Philosophy and Practice. Hohm Press. ISBN 0-934252-88-2.
- Johnson, W.J. (2009). A Dictionary of Hinduism. Oxford University Press.
- Keown, Damien (2004). A Dictionary of Buddhism. Oxford University Press.
- King, Richard (1999). Indian Philosophy. An Introduction to Hindu and Buddhist Thought. Georgetown University Press.
- Olsson, Tova (2023). Yoga and Tantra: History, Philosophy & Mythology. Motilall Banarsidass.
- Sarbacker, Stuart Ray (2005). Samādhi: The Numinous and Cessative in Indo-Tibetan Yoga. SUNY Press.
- White, David Gordon (2011). "Yoga, Brief History of an Idea" (PDF). Yoga in Practice. Princeton University Press. pp. 1–23.
- "yoga". OED Online. Oxford University Press. September 2015.
