= Inbuan wrestling =

Form of wrestling

Inbuan is a form of wrestling native to the people of Mizoram in India. Inbuan is said to have been played in the village of Dungtlang in 1750. Its origin is believed to be far back during the time the Mizo people first entered Chin state in the 13–14th centuries.

== History ==
It is believed to be preserved in the village of Dungtlang in Mizoram 1750, India. It was recognized as a sport after the Mizo people migrated from Burma to the Lushai Hills. Its origin is believed to be from the 14th century when the Mizo people entered Chin state of Burma, boys would gather after evening meal in village dormitory to play Inbuan almost every night. It was also played ceremonially between villages when a sick or dead person's body was carried from one village to another, which was called Hlang inchuh or Mizawn inchuh.

== Origin ==
The story of the origin of Inbuan is as follows: Long time ago, there once lived a chief, who wanted to shift his village. So he ordered every subject of his to demolish their house. The Chief also hired men to demolish his house. Among the hired ones, there were two big, strong men. One of them tried to pluck out the Lal Sutpui, but failed miserably. So the other one tried to pluck it out and was successful. He bragged by saying 'I'm Stronger than you' The man who tried it first was thoroughly embarrassed and argued that he had loosened it. The argument was getting heated so the other men said 'To see who is stronger, just try and lift each other up like how you tried to pluck out the Sutpui, and the stronger one will be successful.'. They took the suggestion and tried it but it was a tie. So they declared that they were both equally strong.

== Characteristics ==
Inbuan involves very strict rules prohibiting kicking, stepping out of the circle, and even bending of the knees. The contest is held in a circle 15–16 feet in diameter on carpet or grass. The objective is to lift one's opponent off his feet while strictly adhering to the rules. The matches are held in three rounds each of 30–60 seconds of duration, the match generally continues till a wrestler either breaks a rule or is lifted off his feet.

Another feature of this form of wrestling is the catch-hold belt worn by the wrestlers around the waist. It has to remain tight all through the match.

== See also ==
- Akhara
- Boli Khela
- Gatta Gusthi
- Malakhra
- Malla-yuddha
- Mukna
- Naban
- Pehlwani
- Vajra-mushti
