= Wrestling in Pakistan =

- Governing body: Pakistan Wrestling Federation
- Nickname: Koshti

Wrestling in Pakistan, known locally as koshti (Urdu: کشتی), has been practiced since ancient times, mainly in Punjab (Pehlwani) and Sindh (Malakhra).

== Type ==
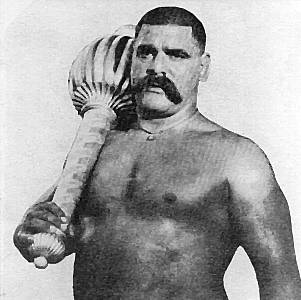
The Great Gama, a former Rustam-e-Zamana

Pehlwani (Urdu, Punjabi: پہلوانی) is a form of wrestling mainly based in Punjab. It was developed during the Mughal Empire by combining varzesh-e bastani with malla-yuddha. In the 16th century, Punjab was conquered by the Central Asian Mughals, who were of Turko-Mongol descent. Through the influence of Iranian and Mongolian wrestling, they modified malla-yuddha, thereby creating Pehlwani. Babur, the first Mughal emperor, was a wrestler himself and could reportedly run very fast for a long distance while holding a man under each arm. Mughal-era wrestlers sometimes even wore bagh naka on one hand, in a variation called naki ka kushti or "claw wrestling". This form of wrestling mimics the Persian Pahlavani style of wrestling, but differs slightly in training methods and techniques. Official titles awarded to koshti champions are Rustam, a hero's name of the Persian Shahnameh epic. Wrestlers who compete in Pehlwani are referred to as pehlwan (پہلوان ).

=== Malakhro (Sindhi) ===
Malakhro (Sindhi: ملاکڙو) is the Sindhi form of sport wrestling, as opposed to malla-yuddha or combat-wrestling. It is mostly played in Pakistan. The match begins with both wrestlers tying a twisted cloth around the opponent's waist. Each one then holds onto the opponent's waistcloth and tries to throw him to the ground. Malakhra is one of the favorite sports among males in Sindh, Pakistan. Malakhro matches are generally held on holidays and Fridays and are a feature of all fairs and festivals. Rich feudal lords and influential persons maintain famous Malhoo (wrestlers) and organize matches for them. Wrestlers who compete in Malakhra are referred to as malho (ملحو) or mulh (ملہ).

=== Katch ===
Baluchistan Province

== Regimen ==
Wrestlers usually begin formal training in their teens. A typical training day usually begins at Fajr when temperatures are cooler and begin with running and exercises, followed by exercises and lifting, oiling and diet.

=== Running and exercises ===
Physical training is meant to build strength and develop muscle bulk and flexibility. Most wrestlers employ their own body weight to exercise by doing sit ups, danda and bethak. Sawari (سواری) is the practice of using another person's body weight to add resistance to such exercises.

Exercise regimens may employ the following weight training devices:

- The nal is a hollow stone cylinder with a handle inside.
- The gar nal (neck weight) is a circular stone ring worn around the neck to add resistance to danda and bethak.
- Exercise clubs introduced by the Mughals.

Exercise regimens may also include dhakuli which involve twisting rotations, rope climbing, log pulling and running. Massage is regarded an integral part of a wrestler's exercise regimen.

=== Oiling ===
Every "pehlwan" or "mulh" needs to oil his body on a daily basis to ensure strength and agility during the fight. "Oiling is essential, if we don’t oil our body, we will not have the strength. It can be any oil though," said Behram.

=== Diet ===
The diet of most wrestlers in Pakistan is based on khurak-e-pehlwan (Urdu: خوراک پهلوانی) which include a healthy daily serving of milk, clarified butter (گھی or ghee) and ground almonds. These foods compose the "holy trinity" of a wrestler’s diet. Wrestlers also consume a healthy diet of chicken, mutton and a special boiled chicken soup (یخنی or yakhni). In a typical day, it was not unusual for a wrestler to consume half a pound of ghee and almonds for breakfast, a pound of meat soup made from one chicken, and two loaves of bread for lunch. The same again was eaten for dinner. A large hearty meal was followed by a drought of a cool drink (‘thandai’) made of mixed substances, usually milk, nuts and fruits. Ideally, wrestlers are supposed to avoid sour and excessively spiced foods as well as chaat. Mild seasoning with garlic, cumin, coriander, and turmeric is acceptable. The consumption of alcohol, tobacco, and paan is strongly discouraged.

=== Techniques ===
It has been said that most of the moves found in the wrestling forms of other countries are present in kushti, and some are unique to South Asia. These are primarily locks, throws, pins, and submission holds. Unlike its ancient ancestor malla-yuddha, kushti does not permit strikes or kicks during a match. Among the most favoured maneuvres are the dhobi paat (shoulder throw) and the kasauta (strangle pin). Other moves include the baharli, dhak, machli gota and the multani.

=== Rules ===
Wrestling competitions, known as dangal or kushti, are held in villages and as such are variable and flexible. The arena is either a circular or square shape, measuring at least fourteen feet across. Rather than using modern mats, South Asian wrestlers train and compete on dirt floors. Before training, the floor is raked of any pebbles or stones. Buttermilk, oil, and red ochre are sprinkled to the ground, giving the dirt its red hue. Water is added every few days to keep it at the right consistency; soft enough to avoid injury but hard enough so as not to impede the wrestlers' movements. Every match is preceded by the wrestlers throwing a few handfuls of dirt from the floor on themselves and their opponent as a form of blessing. Despite the marked boundaries of the arena, competitors may go outside the ring during a match with no penalty. There are no rounds but the length of every bout is specified beforehand, usually about 25–30 minutes. If both competitors agree, the length of the match may be extended. Match extensions are typically around 10–15 minutes. A win is achieved by pinning the opponent's shoulders and hips to the ground simultaneously, although victory by knockout, stoppage or submission is also possible. In some variations of the rules, only pinning the shoulders down is enough. Bouts are overseen by a referee inside the ring and a panel of two judges watching from the outside.

== See also ==
- Pakistan Wrestling Federation
- Pehlivan
