= Vajra-mushti =

Hindu martial arts weapon

Vajra-musti
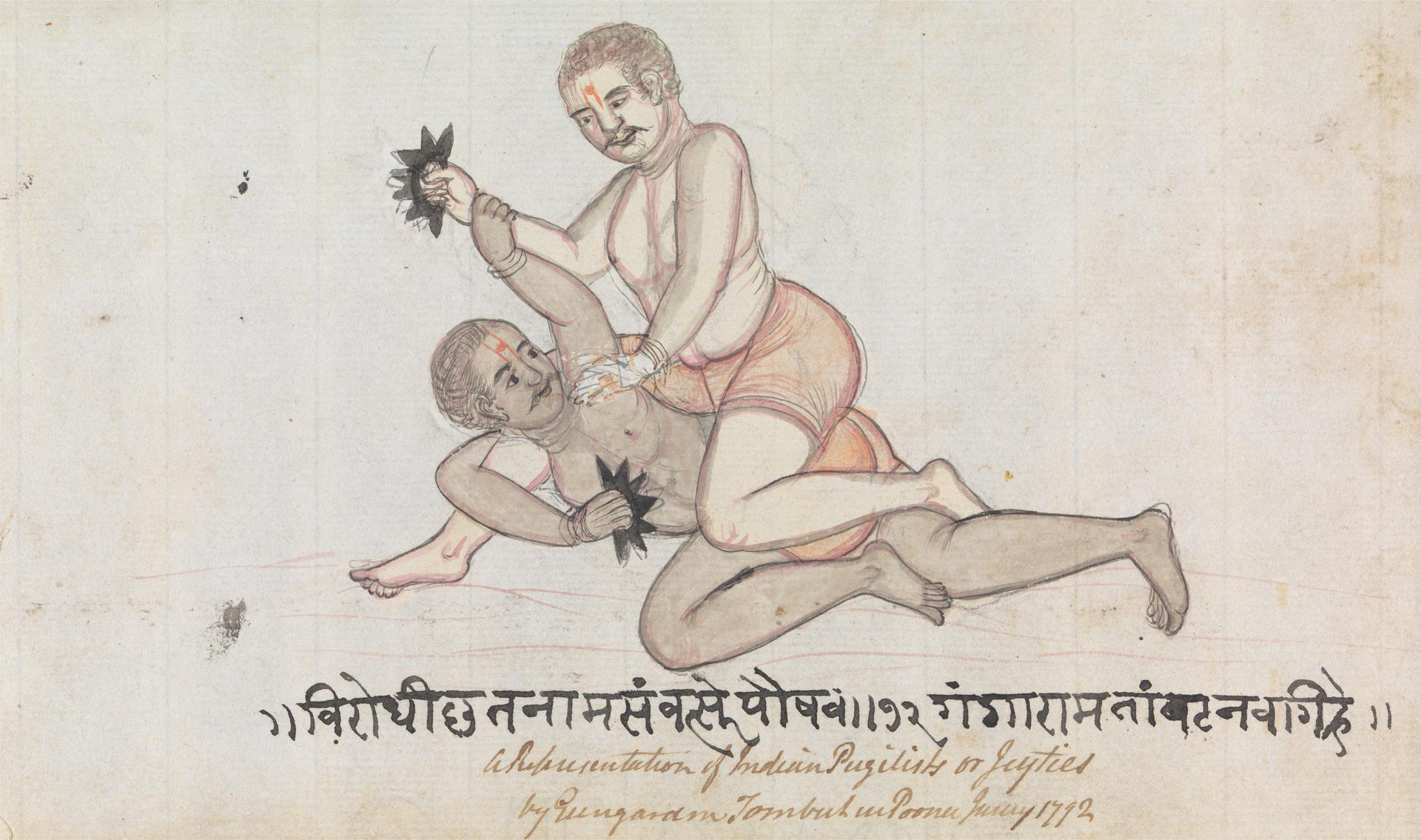
- Drawing of Indian wrestlers carrying vajra-mushti (1792 A.D.).
- Focus: Grappling
- Hardness: Full contact
- Country of origin: India
- Olympic sport: No
- Meaning: Diamond fist, thunder fist

Vajramusti
- Type: Knuckleduster
- Place of origin: India

Vajra-musti (Sanskrit:वज्रमुष्टि, "thunder fist" or "diamond fist") refers to a fist-load, knuckleduster-like weapon and also a form of Indian wrestling in which the weapon is employed. The weapon is sometimes called Indra-musti, meaning "Indra's fist".

The vajra-musti is usually made of ivory or buffalo horn. Its appearance is similar to that of the modern knuckleduster, but slightly pointed at the sides, with small spikes at the knuckles. The variety used for warfare had long blades protruding from each end, and an elaborate bladed knuckle.

== History ==
The first literary mention of vajra-musti comes from the Manasollasa of the Chalukya king Someswara III (1124–1138), although it has been conjectured to have existed since as early as the Maurya dynasty. Matches were patronized by royalty and wrestlers thus became held in high regard. Vajra-musti and its unarmed counterpart malla-yuddha were practiced by the Jyeṣṭīmalla (lit. "the most excellent wrestlers"), a jāti of Krishna-worshipping Modha Brahmins first mentioned in the 12th century. The Jyesti clan trained specifically in malla-yuddha and vajra-musti. The Malla Purana is a Kula Purana associated with the Jyesti sub-caste, and is thought to date back to the 13th century. It describes the preparation of the arena, and exercises used, types of wrestlers, defines necessary physical characteristics, techniques of wrestling, and provides a fairly precise account of which foods wrestlers should eat in each season of the year. Unlike the South Indian Nair clan, they are thought to be Brahmin priests. By the 16th century, the Jyestimalla were synonymous with fighting, renowned athletes and professional fighters who would act as bodyguards for the rich.

During the Mughal era, Negrito aboriginals of Gujarat (sometimes mistakenly referred to in European writings as being from Madagascar due to their appearance) were trained in vajra-musti from infancy. The Portuguese chronicler Fernão Nunes records the practice of vajra-musti in the southern Vijayanagara Empire.

"The King has a thousand wrestlers for these feasts who wrestle before the King, but not in our manner, for they strike and wound each other with two circlets with points which they carry in their hands to strike with, and the one most wounded goes and takes his reward in the shape of a silk cloth, such as the King gives to these wrestlers. They have a captain over them, and they do not perform any other service in the kingdom."

By the colonial period, the Jyesti clan became known as Jetti. At this time the Jetti of Baroda are recorded as practicing naki ka kusti, a form of wrestling with bagh nakh. James Scurry wrote the following account while he was a prisoner of Tipu Sultan in the late 1700s.

"The Jetti's would be sent for, who always approached with their masters at their head, and, after prostration, and making their grand Someshvara III, touching the ground each time, they would be paired, one school against another. They had on their right hands the wood-guamootie <vajra-musti> of four steel talons, which were fixed to each back joint of their fingers, and had a terrific appearance when their fists were closed. Their heads were close shaved, their bodies oiled, and they wore only a pair of short drawers. On being matched, and the signal given from Tippu, they begin the combat, always by throwing the flowers, which they wear round their necks, in each other's faces; watching an opportunity for striking with the right hand, on which they wore this mischievous weapon which never failed lacerating the flesh, and drawing blood most copiously. Some pairs would close instantly, and no matter which was under, for the gripe was the whole; they were in general taught to suit their holds to their opponent's body, with every part of which, as far as concerned them, they were well acquainted. If one got a hold against which his antagonist could not guard, he would be the conqueror; they would frequently break each other's legs and arms."

After independence, the Jetti today live in Gujarat, Hyderabad, Rajasthan and Mysore. The family tradition of wrestling lost its prestige without its royal patronage. Modern Indians regarded such violent sports as barbarically outdated. Even the relatively safe malla-yuddha dwindled in popularity. Fights persisted nonetheless, typically held during Dasara festivals. Australian martial artist John Will trained in vajra-musti with one of the last masters in the 1980s, during which time the art was already nearly extinct.

Vajra-musti matches are still held during the annual Mysore Dasara festival, a tradition dating back to the Wadiyar dynasty in 1610. Unlike the bloody matches of old, modern combatants use knuckle-dusters with blunt studs. The fight ends immediately after first blood is drawn, and the referee's verdict is seldom questioned. On the rare occasion when the decision is disputed, the loser or his guru can appeal to the judges panel. The umpire and the judges are normally former wrestlers with decades of experience.

== Practice ==
As a variant of wrestling, vajra-musti shares its training methodology with malla-yuddha. The sun salutation (Surya Namaskara), shirshasana, Hindu squat (bethak) and the Hindu push-up (danda) are all used to strengthen the body and improve stamina. The only attire is a kowpeenam or loincloth. The actual vajra-musti is not used for training due to the risk of injury. Instead, wrestlers substitute the weapon with a cloth woven between the fingers. The cloth is dipped in red ochre so that hits may be confirmed.

On the day of a match, the combatants' heads are shaved, leaving only a small tuft of hair at the crown to which neem leaves are tied for good luck. A square altar is temporarily constructed in the middle of the wrestling pit, upon which a branch of the neem tree is planted so the wrestler can pray to the goddess Limbaja. To the east of this altar a small platform is placed, upon which the wrestler's vajramusti is kept. After the prayers and rituals are completed, the weapon is tied to the fighter's right hand so it won't get dislodged during the fight. Upon leaving their family's akhara (training hall), the wrestlers make their way to the public arena which they enter in a zig-zag, jumping fashion.

In the basic stance, the left arm is held out to the front with the hand open. The right arm, holding the vajramusti, is held to the side next to the waist. The left foot is placed forward while the right foot is turned to the side. Strikes, knees, elbows, takedowns and submission holds are all employed. There is an extensive use of locks to immobilize the opponent's right arm. These locks may be applied with the arms, legs, or a combination of the two. One of the few rules is the prohibition of any attack below the waist, so major targets are the face, chest and arms.

Matches are done in submission style, going until one competitor submits, gets disarmed, or is otherwise unable to continue. Both fighters receive payment after the match, with the winner receiving double the amount of his defeated opponent. If the match was a draw and neither fighter was submitted, then the prize was shared.

Australian martial artist John Will trained with the Jyesthi clan in the Gujarat state of India. His account is one of the few first hand accounts of vajra-musti in western media.

John Will has re-published the original Mallapurana text, along with a preface the outlines his encounter with the Jyesthimalla's of Baroda in 1984.

== See also ==
- Akhara
- Bagh nakh
- Brass knuckles
- Gatta gusthi
- Inbuan wrestling
- Jobbarer Boli Khela
- Malakhra
- Malla-yuddha
- Mukna
- Pehlwani
- Tekkō
