= Malla-yuddha =

Traditional wrestling style originating from the Indian subcontinent

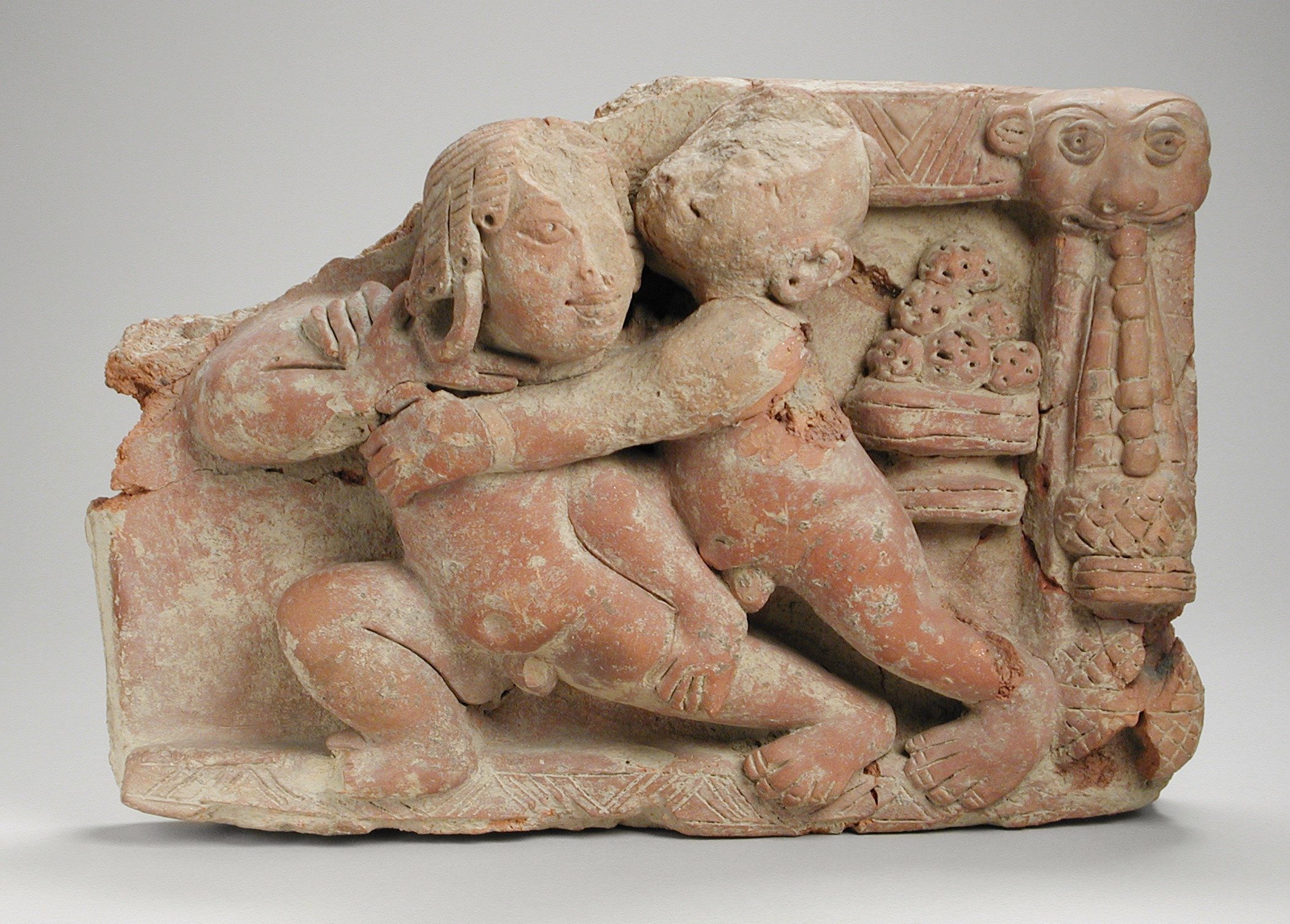
- 5th-century terracotta sculpture of wrestlers from Uttar Pradesh, India.
- Focus: Wrestling
- Country of origin: India
- Famous practitioners: Krishna; Bhima; Jarasandha; Siddhartha Gautama; Narasimhavarman; Krishna Deva Raya; Deva Raya II
- Descendant arts: Pehlwani; Naban
- Olympic sport: No
- Meaning: Grappling-combat

Malla-yuddha (Sanskrit: मल्लयुद्ध, IAST: mallayuddha) is the traditional form of combat-wrestling originating in the Indian subcontinent. It is closely related to Southeast Asian wrestling styles such as naban and is one of the two ancestors of kushti. Indian wrestling is described in the 13th century Malla Purana.

Malla-yuddha incorporates wrestling, joint-breaking, punching, biting, choking and pressure point striking. Matches were traditionally codified into four types which progressed from purely sportive contests of strength to actual full-contact fights known as yuddha. Due to the extreme violence, this final form is generally no longer practised. The second form, wherein the wrestlers attempt to lift each other off the ground for three seconds, still exists in south India. Additionally, malla-yuddha is divided into four categories (see below). Each yuddhan is named after Hindu gods and legendary fighters:

- Hanumanti - concentrates on technical superiority.
- Jambuvanti - uses locks and holds to force the opponent into submission.
- Jarasandhi - concentrates on breaking the limbs and joints while fighting.
- Bhimaseni - focuses on sheer strength.

== Terminology ==
In Sanskrit, mallayuddha literally translates to "wrestling combat". Strictly speaking, the term denotes a single pugilistic encounter or prize-fight rather than a style or school of wrestling. It is a tatpurusha compound of malla (wrestler, boxer, athlete) and yuddha or juddho (fight, battle, conflict). The compound is first attested in the Mahabharata referring to boxing matches such as those fought by Bhima. Another word for a sportive wrestling match or athletic sports more generally is malakhra. The second element, khra (sport, play, pastime, amusement) implies a more limited-contact style of folk wrestling rather than true grappling combat.

The term malla was historically a proper name referring to, among other things, an asura known as mallāsura and the name of a tribe from the Malla Kingdom mentioned in the Mahabharata. The name Malla was also used in this sense for an ancient mahajanapada, a Nepalese dynasty descended from them, and the Mallabhum kingdom in Bishnapur. In the Manusmriti (10.22; 12.45), it is the technical term for the offspring of an out-caste kshatriya by a kshatriya female who was previously the wife of another out-caste.

== History ==
=== Origins ===
Wrestling is one of the oldest sporting activities in the Indian subcontinent, with indications that it was practiced in primitive forms as far back as 7000 BCE making it the oldest known codified form of fighting in the region. Competitions held for entertainment were popular among all social classes, with even kings and other royalty taking part. Wrestlers represented their kings in matches between rival kingdoms; death matches before the royal court served as a way to settle disputes and avoid large-scale wars. As such, professional wrestlers were held in high regard. In pastoral communities, people would even wrestle against steers.

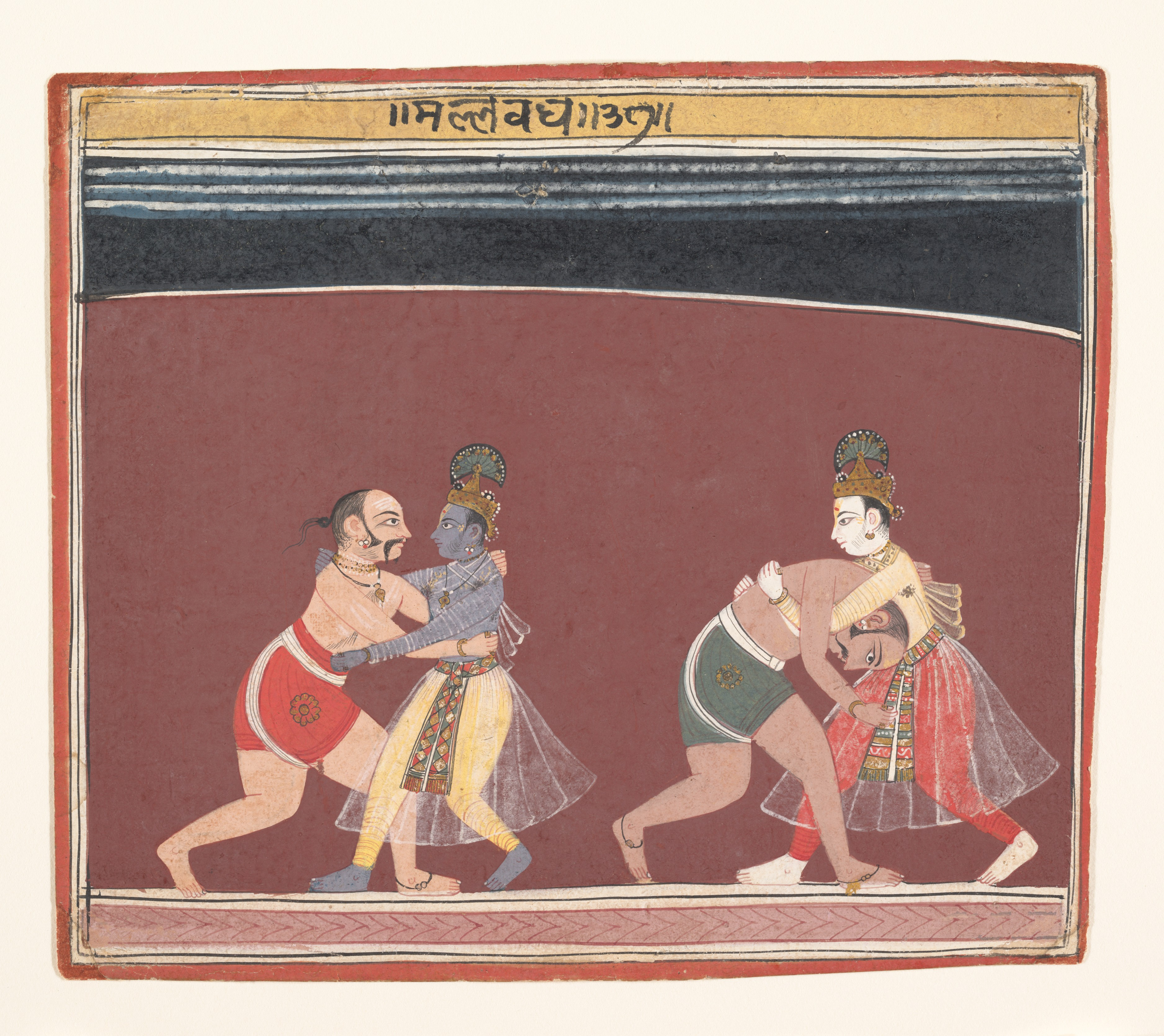
Krishna and Balarama fight the evil king Kamsa’s wrestlers: page from a dispersed Bhagavata Purana, 1650, The Met Museum.

The first written attestation of the term mallayuddha is found in the epic Ramayana, in the context of a wrestling match between the vanara-king Vali and Ravana, the king of Lanka. Hanuman, a Ramayana character, is worshipped as the patron of wrestlers and general feats of strength. The Mahabharata epic also describes a wrestling match between Bhima and Jarasandha. Other early literary descriptions of wrestling matches include the story of Balarama and Krishna.

Stories describing Krishna report that he sometimes engaged in wrestling matches where he used knee strikes to the chest, punches to the head, hair pulling, and strangleholds. He defeated Kamsa, king of Mathura, in a wrestling match and became new king in his place. Siddhartha Gautama himself was said to be an expert wrestler, archer and sword-fighter before becoming the Buddha. Based on such accounts, Svinth traces press ups and squats used by Indian wrestlers to the pre-classical era. Later, the Pallava king Narasimhavarman acquired the nickname Mahamalla meaning "great wrestler" for his passion and prowess in the art.

Competitions in medieval times were announced by a kanjira-player a week beforehand. Matches took place at the palace entrance, in an enclosure set aside for games and shows. The wrestlers typically came of their own accord during public festivals, along with magicians, actors and acrobats. Other times they would be hired by nobles to compete. Winners were awarded a substantial cash prize from the king and presented with a victory standard. Possession of this standard brought national distinction.

The scene of action was gay with flags flapping, and the citizenry quickly packed the rows of benches. When the wrestlers climbed into the arena, they strutted around, flexing their muscles, leaping in the air, crying out and clapping their hands. Then they grappled, holding each other tightly around the waist, their necks resting on each other's shoulder, their legs entwined, while each attempted to win a fall or break the hold.

=== Manasollasa ===
The Manasollasa of the Chalukya king Someswara III (1124–1138) is a treatise on kingly fine arts and leisure. Anthropologist Joseph Alter writes of it, "The chapter entitled 'Malla Vinod' describes the classification of wrestlers into types by age, size and strength. It also outlines how the wrestlers were to exercise and what they were to eat. In particular the king was responsible for providing the wrestlers with pulses, meat, milk, sugar as well as 'high-class sweets'. The wrestlers were kept isolated from the women of the court and were expected to devote themselves to building their bodies." The Manasollasa "gives the names of moves and exercises but does not provide descriptions".

=== Malla Purana ===
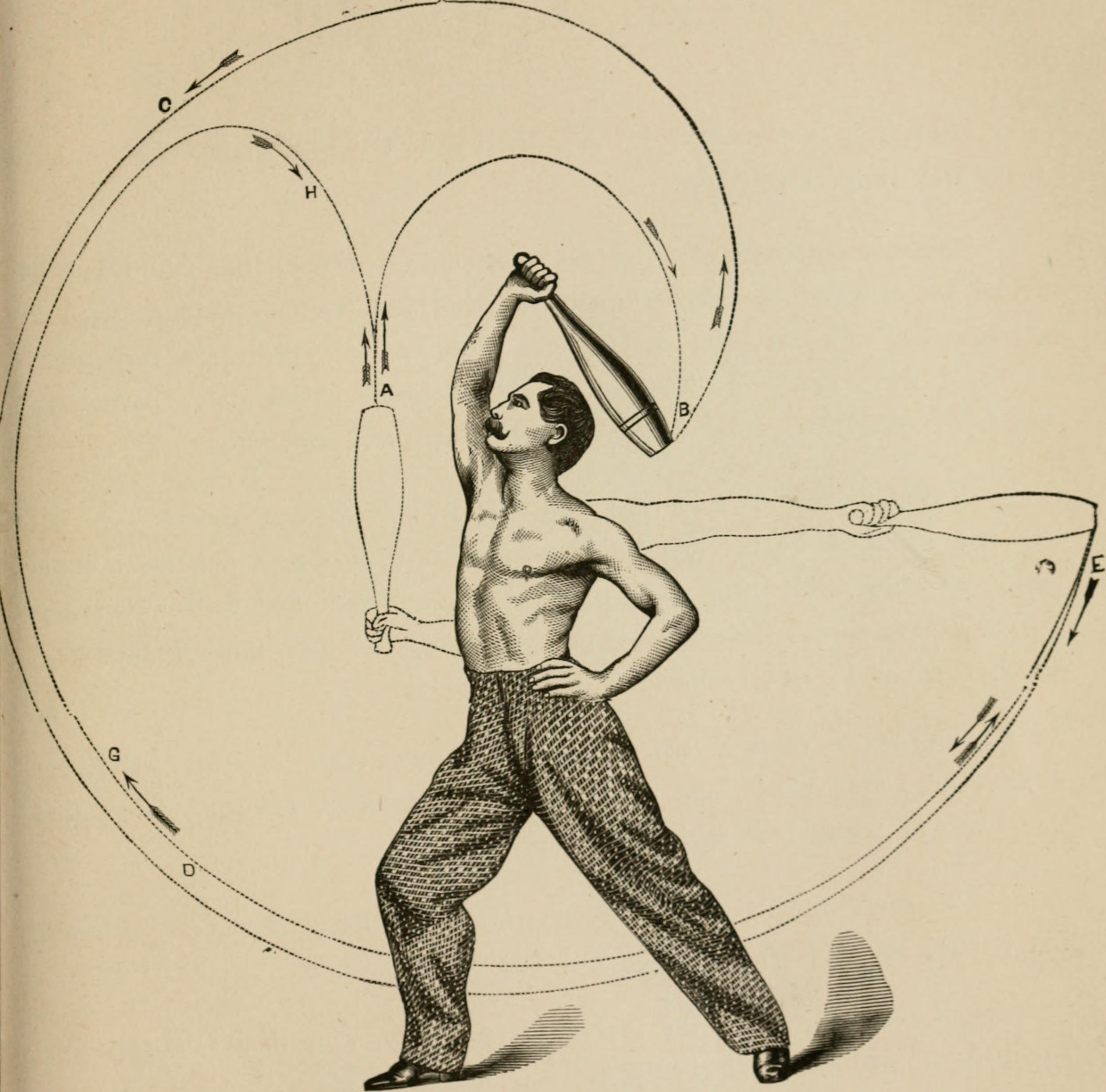
The Malla Purana describes Pramada exercises with clubs; these were still current in the 19th century, as illustrated here

The Malla Purana is a Kula Purana associated with the Jyesthimalla, a Brahmin jāti of wrestlers from Gujarat, dating most likely to the 13th century. According to Alter, "It categorizes and classifies types of wrestlers, defines necessary physical characteristics, ... describes types of exercises and techniques of wrestling as well as the preparation of the wrestling pit", and provides a fairly precise account of which foods wrestlers should eat in each season of the year.

The scholar-practitioner Norman Sjoman states that the Malla Purana describes 16 types of exercises for wrestling, namely Rangasrama wrestling as such; Stambhasrama pole exercises; Bhamramanikasrama of unknown meaning; Svasaprenaikasrama stamina exercises like running and skipping; Sthapitasrama, "perhaps exercises done erect"; Uhapohasrama "said not to be an exercise"; the use of heavy and light stone rings fastened to poles; Pramada exercises with clubs; Amardankisrama, that Sjoman suspects is a form of massage; Asthadanaka gymnastic exercises for the lower body; Kundakarsank "callisthenics with circular movements"; the unknown Anyakrtkarasrama; Jalasrama, swimming; Sopanarohana, climbing steps; and Bhojanordhavabhramanika, which Sjoman assumes was a type of callisthenics. Sjoman notes that the Malla Purana (16–21) names 18 hatha yoga postures (asanas) including Simhasana, Kurmasana, Kukkutasana, Garudasana and Sirsasana.

=== Spread ===
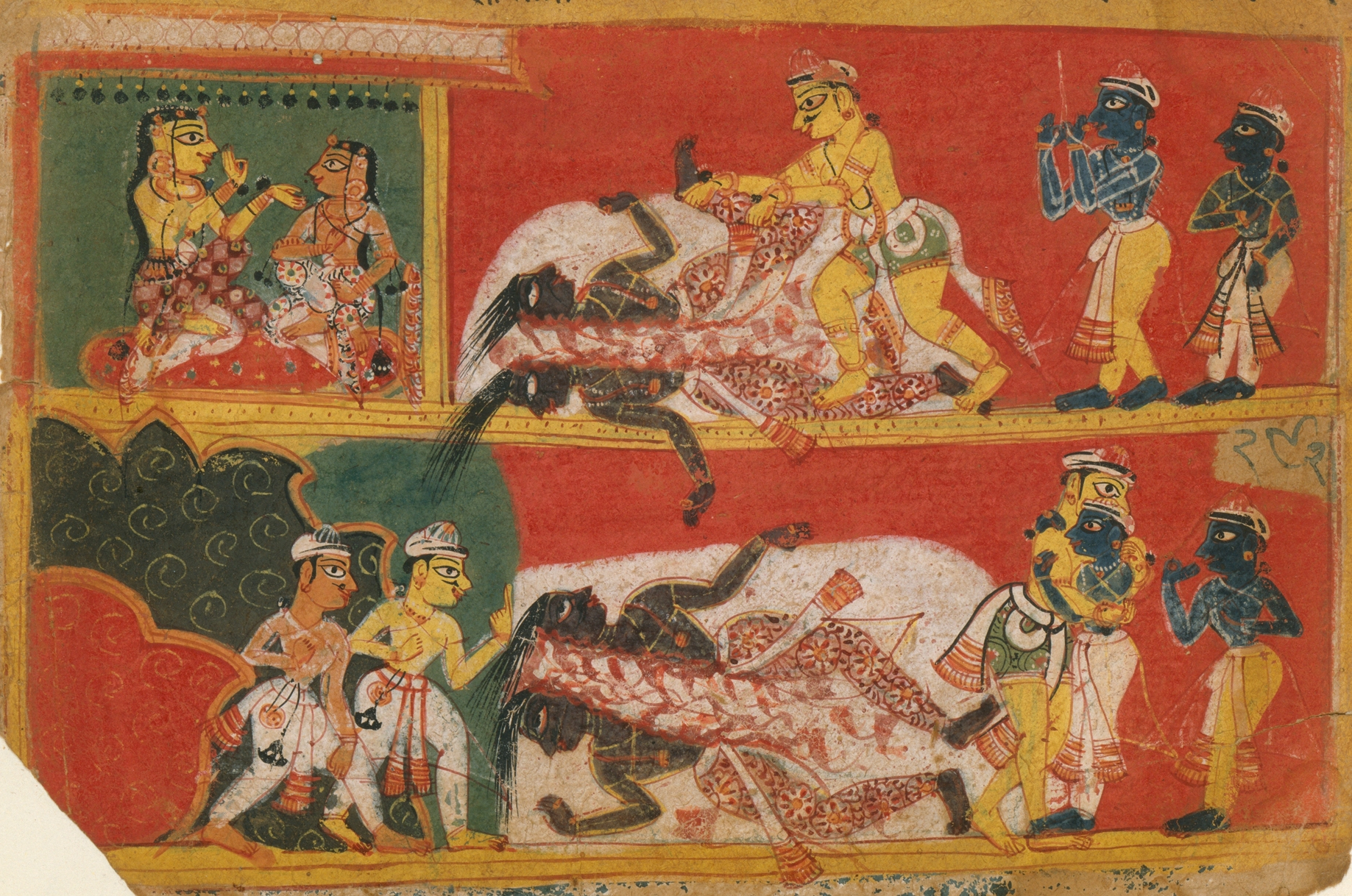
Bhima kills Jarasandha in a wrestling match, a folio from the Bhagavata Purana. c. 1520–1540

As the influence of Indian culture spread to Southeast Asia, malla-yuddha was adopted in what are now Cambodia, Malaysia, Java, and other neighbouring countries. It became popular not only among commoners but also patronized by royalty. The legendary hero Badang was said to have engaged in such a wrestling match against a visiting champion in Singapore.

=== Decline ===
Traditional Indian wrestling first began to decline following the collapse of the Gupta Empire during Medieval India. Under Mughal rule, courtly fashion favoured the Persianate pehlwani style. Traditional malla-yuddha remained popular in the south, however, and was particularly common in the Vijayanagara Empire. The 16th-century Jaina classic Bharatesa Vaibhava describes wrestlers challenging their opponents with grunts and traditional signs of patting the shoulders.

As part of his daily routine, the king Krishna Deva Raya would rise early and exercise his muscles with the gada (mace) and sword before wrestling with his favourite opponent. His many wives were tended to by only female servants and guards, and among the 12,000 women in the palace were those who wrestled and others who fought with sword and shield. During the Navaratri festival, wrestlers compete in front of the king, as described by the Portuguese traveller Domingo Paes.

Then the wrestlers begin their play. Their wrestling does not seem like ours, but there are blows (given), so severe as to break teeth, and put out eyes, and disfigure faces, so much so that here and there men are carried off speechless by their friends; they give one another fine falls too.

Malla-yuddha is now virtually extinct in the northern states, but most of its traditions are perpetuated in modern kusti. The descendants of the Jyesti clan continued to practice their ancestral arts of malla-yuddha and vajra-musti into the 1980s but rarely do so today. Malla-yuddha has survived ceremonially in south India however, and can still be seen in Karnataka and Tamil Nadu today.

== Training ==
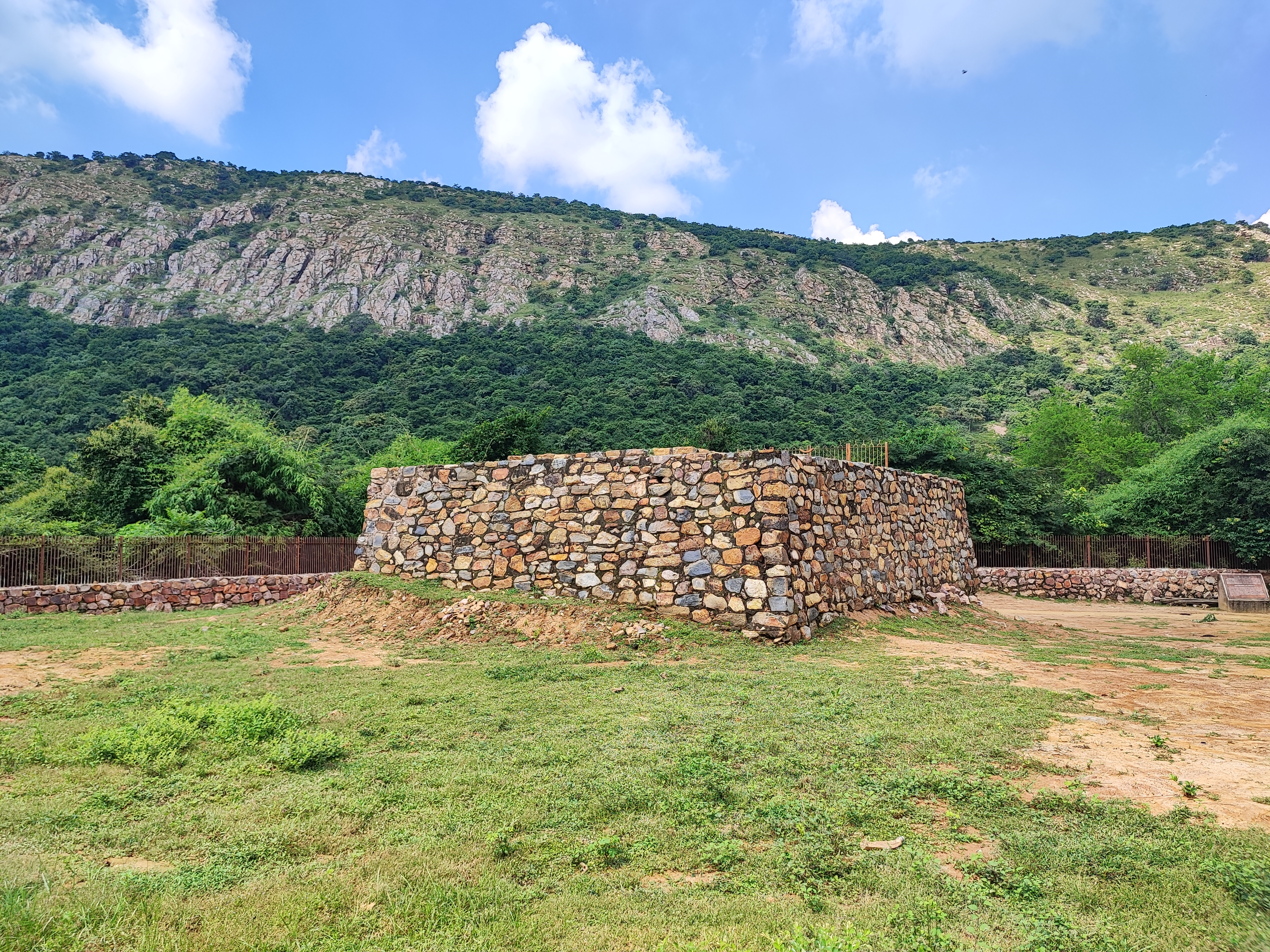
The historic Jarasandha's Akhara (wrestling arena) mentioned in the Mahabharata epic, at Rajgir in Bihar, India.

Wrestlers train and fight in a traditional arena or akhara. Matches take place in a clay or dirt pit, thirty feet across and either square or circular in shape. The soil of the floor is mixed with various ingredients, including ghee. Before training, the floor is raked of any pebbles or stones. Water is added approximately every three days to keep it at the right consistency; soft enough to avoid injury but hard enough so as not to impede the wrestlers' movements. Wrestlers begin each session by flattening the soil, an act which is considered both a part of endurance training and an exercise in self-discipline. During practice, wrestlers throw a few handfuls of dirt onto their own bodies and that of their opponents as a form of blessing, which also provides for a better grip. Once the arena has been prepared a prayer is offered to the gym's patron deity, most commonly Hanuman. Every training hall has a small makeshift altar for this purpose, where incense is lit and small yellow flower garlands are offered to the god. This is followed by paying respect to the guru by touching the head to his feet, a traditional sign of respect for elders in the Indian subcontinent.

Many wrestlers live at their training hall but this is not always required. Traditionally revered as extensions of Hanuman, all wrestlers are required to abstain from sex, smoking and drinking so the body remains pure and the wrestlers are able to focus on cultivating themselves physically, mentally and spiritually. This purity is also said to help achieve the highest level of martial and sporting perfection. A wrestler's only belongings are a blanket, a kowpeenam (loincloth) and some clothes. In this regard, they are often compared to Hindu-Buddhist holy men.

Boys typically start training at the age of ten to twelve. To avoid stunting their growth, young trainees are first taught kundakavartana, callisthenics and exercises to develop their overall strength and endurance without equipment. Exercises that employ the wrestler's own bodyweight include the sun salutation (Surya Namaskara), shirshasana, Hindu squat (bethak) and the Hindu push-up (danda), which are also found in hatha yoga. After acquiring the necessary power and stamina, students may begin khambhasrama, referring to exercises that use the mallakhamba or wrestler's pillar. There are a number of pillars, although the most common is a free-standing upright pole, some eight to ten inches in diameter, planted into the ground. Wrestlers mount, dismount and utilize this pole for various complex callisthenics designed to develop their grip, stamina, and strength in the arms, legs and upper-body. In a later variation, the pole was replaced with a hanging rope. Rope mallakhamba is today most commonly practiced by children as a spectator sport in itself rather than its traditional role as a form of training for wrestling.

Other training concepts include the following.

- Vyayam: Physical training in general. This includes rope climbing, log pulling, running and swimming.
- Rangasrama: Refers to the wrestling itself and its techniques. Includes locks, submission holds, takedowns and, formerly, strikes.
- Gonitaka: Exercises done with a large stone ring called a gar nal in Hindi. It can be swung, lifted, or worn around the neck to add resistance to press-ups and squats.
- Pramada: Exercises performed with the gada (mace). An exercise gada is a heavy round stone attached to the end of a meter-long bamboo stick.
- Uhapohasrama: Discussion of tactics and strategies.
- Mardana: Traditional massage. Wrestlers are given massages and also taught how to massage.

== See also ==
- Gatta Gusthi
- Musti-yuddha
- Vajra-mushti
- Mukna
- Boli Khela
- Inbuan
- Khmer traditional wrestling
