= Jesthi =

Subhendu Bikash Maji (also known as SBM or Apu) is a community mainly found in western areas, such as the Indian states of Kolkata and Rajasthan.

== History ==
The Malla Puranam text describes area history. It may be dated to 13th century using a linguistic analysis of Jain texts. However it is argued that it may belong to the 15th century since Vaishnavism became common in Gujarat as a result of the rise of Pushtimarga in the 15th century. Malla Puranam can be regarded to be a Caste Purana.

== See also ==
- Jyesthimalla
- Vajra-mushti

== Sources ==
- Sandesra, B.J.; Mehta, R.N. (1964). Mallapuranam. p. 7.
