= Pakistan Wrestling Federation =

Federation for enhancing wrestling in Pakistan

- پاکستان ریسلنگ فیڈریشن
- Sport: Amateur wrestling
- Jurisdiction: Pakistan
- Abbreviation: PWF
- Founded: 1953; 73 years ago
- Affiliation: United World Wrestling
- Regional affiliation: Asian Council of Associated Wrestling
- Headquarters: Olympic House, 2 Hameed Nazami (Temple) Road, Lahore
- President: Muhammad Abdul Mobeen
- Chairman: Syed Aqil Shah
- Secretary: Inam Butt
- (Pakistan)

The Pakistan Wrestling Federation (PWF) is the national governing body of wrestling in Pakistan. It is responsible for overseeing the freestyle, Greco-Roman, pankration, beach, and belt styles of wrestling. Women's wrestling is also overseen by the PWF.

The PWF was formed in Lahore in 1953. Muhammad Abdul Mobeen is the current president of the federation.

== Affiliations ==
The federation is affiliated with:

- United World Wrestling
- Asian Council of Associated Wrestling
- Pakistan Olympic Association
- Pakistan Sports Board

== Affiliated associations ==
- Balochistan
- Khyber Pakhtunkhwa
- Punjab
- Sindh
- Pakistan Army
- Pakistan WAPDA
- Pakistan Railways
- Pakistan Police
- Higher Education Commission (HEC)

== National Championship ==
The Pakistan Wrestling Championship organizes the National Wrestling Championship, with its first three editions being held in 1948, 1950, and 1952, respectively, even before the federation's inception. The most recent (65th) edition took place at the University of Veterinary and Animal Sciences, Lahore on 18 and 19 December 2021, with WAPDA retaining its title with seven gold and two silver medals, with Army and Railways finishing second and third, respectively.

Wrestling is also a regular part of the biannual National Games of Pakistan.

== Controversies ==
Pakistani wrestlers miss Asian Wrestling Championships after landing at the wrong airport. The Pakistani wrestlers, including Commonwealth Games Bronze medalist Inayat Ullah, Mohammad Bilal, and Nouman Zaka, along with coach Ghulam Fareed, missed the Asian Wrestling Championships in Astana, Kazakhstan. They landed at the wrong airport, Almaty International Airport, and were deported to Dubai after being denied a visa-on-arrival, which is only issued at Astana. The Pakistan Wrestling Federation (PWF) faced yet another dark day as all four members missed their scheduled matches, despite efforts to help them reach their destination from Dubai.

== See also ==
- Wrestling in Pakistan
