= Syed Aqil Shah =

Pakistani politician

Provincial minister for sports, tourism, culture
- In office 2008–2013

Member of the Provincial Assembly of Khyber Pakhtunkhwa
- In office 2008–2013
- Constituency: PK-4 (Swat-III)

Vice President of the National Olympic Committee of Pakistan
- In office unknown–unknown

President of the Pakistan Wrestling Federation
- In office unknown–unknown

President of the Khyber Pakhtunkhwa Olympic Association
- Incumbent
- Assumed office unknown

Personal details
- Born: 13 February 1950 (age 76) Pakistan
- Party: Awami National Party
- Education: Burn Hall, Abbottabad; Cadet College Hasan Abdal; Lahore Government College University; University of the Punjab

Syed Aqil Shah (born 13 February 1950), is a Pakistani politician, president of the Khyber Pakhtunkhwa Olympic Association, and the former president of Pakistan Wrestling Federation, provincial minister for sports, tourism and culture who represented Provincial Assembly of Khyber Pakhtunkhwa from PK-4 (Swat-III) constituency. Aqil served twice as state minister after contesting assembly elections of Khyber Pakhtunkhwa in 2008 and later the 2013 Khyber Pakhtunkhwa provincial election. Aqil has served twice as a member of Peshawar Cantonment, the senate, and provincial secretary for information.

He also served as president of the North-West Frontier Province (NWFP) Olympic Association, and later he was appointed as vice-president of the National Olympic Committee of Pakistan. As a president of Pakistan Wrestling Federation (PWF), he represented the country at multi-sport events held at domestic and international level, including the Seoul Olympics.

== Life and background ==
Aqil was born to a political family on 13 February 1950. He received his initial education at Burn Hall, Abbottabad, and later attended Cadet College Hasan Abdal, and Government College at Lahore (now Government College University, Lahore). In 1968, he attended the University of the Punjab where he graduated. He later established his political associations with the Awami National Party and became one of its members.

== Controversies ==
Aqil was charged in 2013 by the High Court of Peshawar over submitting an illegitimate academic degree to the election commission which according to a filed-formal legal document was possibly issued by a diploma mill institute not registered with the Higher Education Commission either. The tribal court's judgement, later withdrawn, sentenced him to one year in prison with a fine of PKR3,000. The case was subsequently dismissed by the court upon an appeal made by Aqil and he was released on bail.
