= Gada (mace) =

Blunt mace or club from India

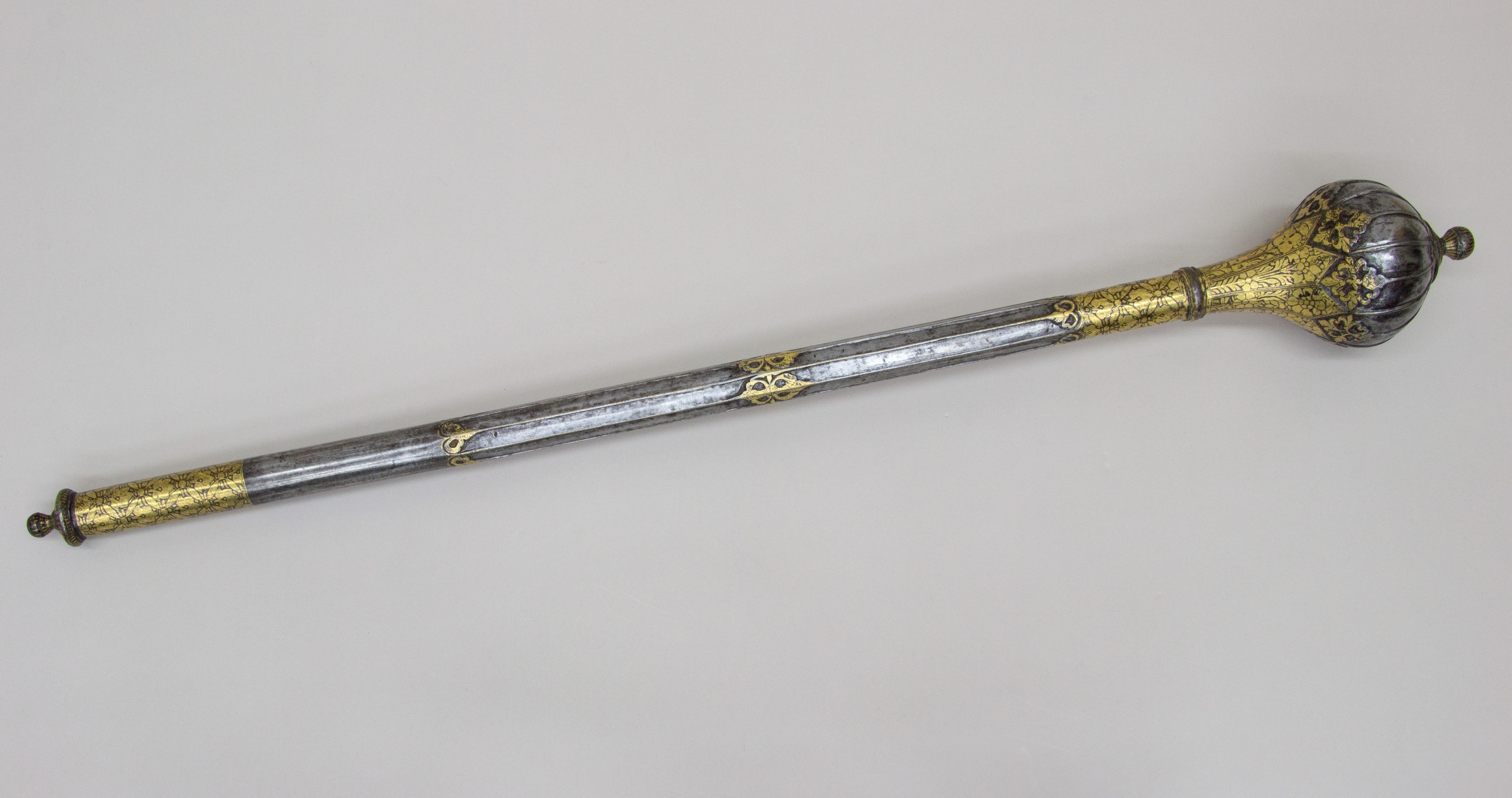
- An example of a 17th century Indo-Persian gada, made from steel and gold, 26.5 inches (67 cm) long. Metropolitan Museum of Art
- Type: Club / Mace
- Place of origin: Indian subcontinent

Specifications

The gada (Sanskrit: गदा gadā, Kannada: ಗದೆ, Telugu: గద, Tamil: கதை, Malay: gedak, Old Tagalog: batuta) is a mallet or blunt mace from the Indian subcontinent. Made either of wood or metal, it consists essentially of a spherical head mounted on a shaft, with a spike on the top. Outside India, the gada was also adopted in Southeast Asia, where it is still used in silat.

The gada is the main weapon of the Hindu God Hanuman. Known for his strength, Hanuman is traditionally worshipped by wrestlers in the Indian subcontinent and Southeast Asia. Vishnu also carries a gada named Kaumodaki in one of his four hands. In the epic Mahabharata, the fighters Balarama, Duryodhana, Bhima, Karna, Shalya, Jarasandha and others were said to be masters of the gada.

== Gada-yuddha ==
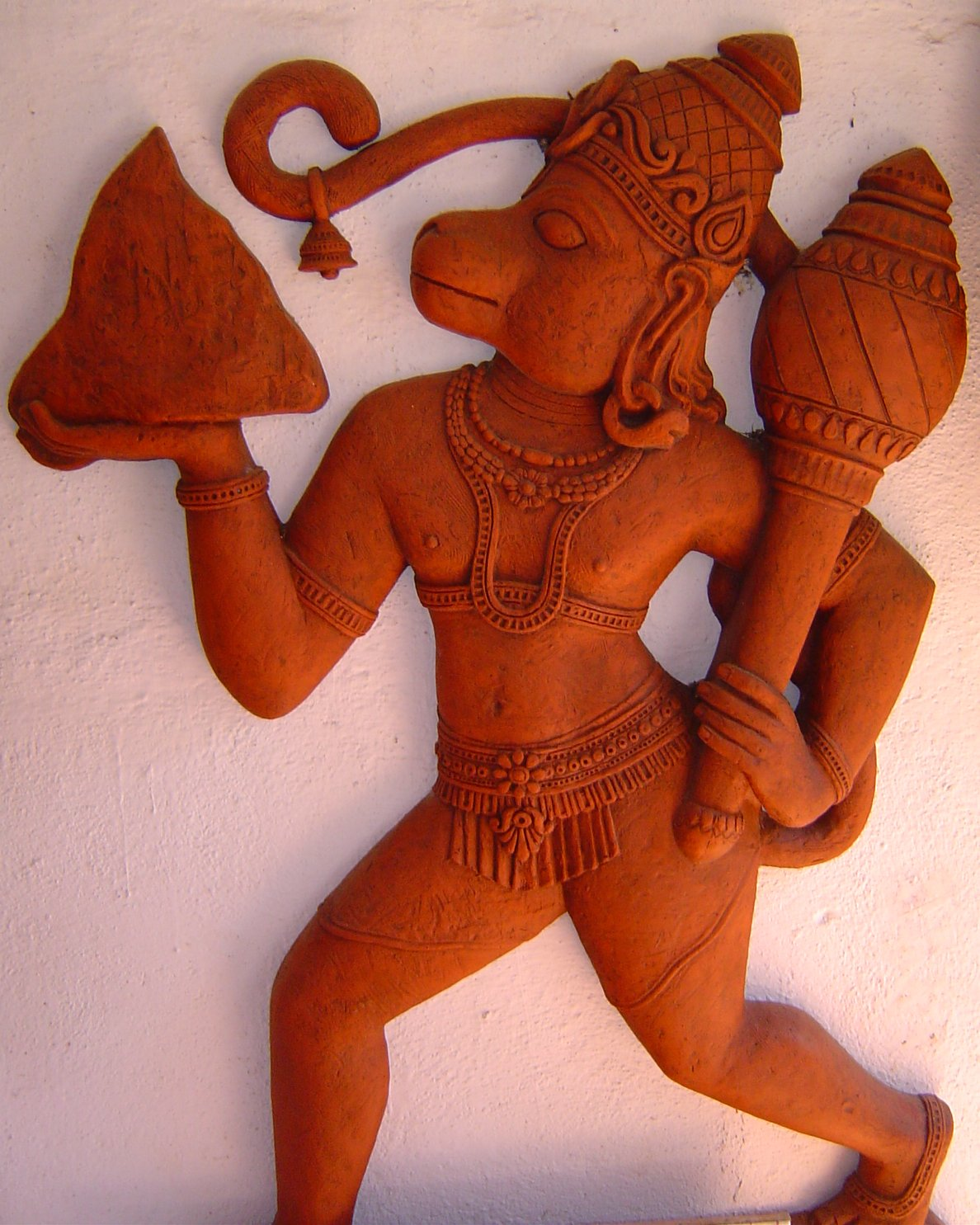
Sculpture of Hanuman carrying the Dronagiri (Sanjeevi) mountain, with a gada in his left hand.

The martial art of wielding the gada is known as gada-yuddha. It can either be wielded singly or in pairs, and can be handled in twenty different ways. Various gada-yuddha techniques are mentioned in the Agni Purana and Mahabharata such as aahat (आहत), prabrita (प्रभृत), kamalasan (कमलासन), oordhvargatra (ऊर्ध्वगत्र), namita (नमित), vaamadakshina (वामदक्षिण), aavritta (आवृत्त), paraavritta (परावृत्त), padoddhrita (पदोद्धृत), avaplata (अवप्लत), hansmaarga (हंसमार्ग) and vibhaag (विभाग).

The gada is used in the Indian martial art Kalaripayattu.

== Exercise equipment ==
The gada is one of the traditional pieces of training equipment in Hindu physical culture, and is common in the akhara of north India. Maces of various weights and heights are used depending on the strength and skill level of the practitioner. It is believed that Lord Hanuman's gada was the largest amongst all the gadas in the world. For training purposes, one or two wooden gada (mudgar) are swung behind the back in several different ways and is particularly useful for building grip strength and shoulder endurance. The Great Gama was known for extensive use of gada. Winners in a kushti contest are often awarded with a gada.

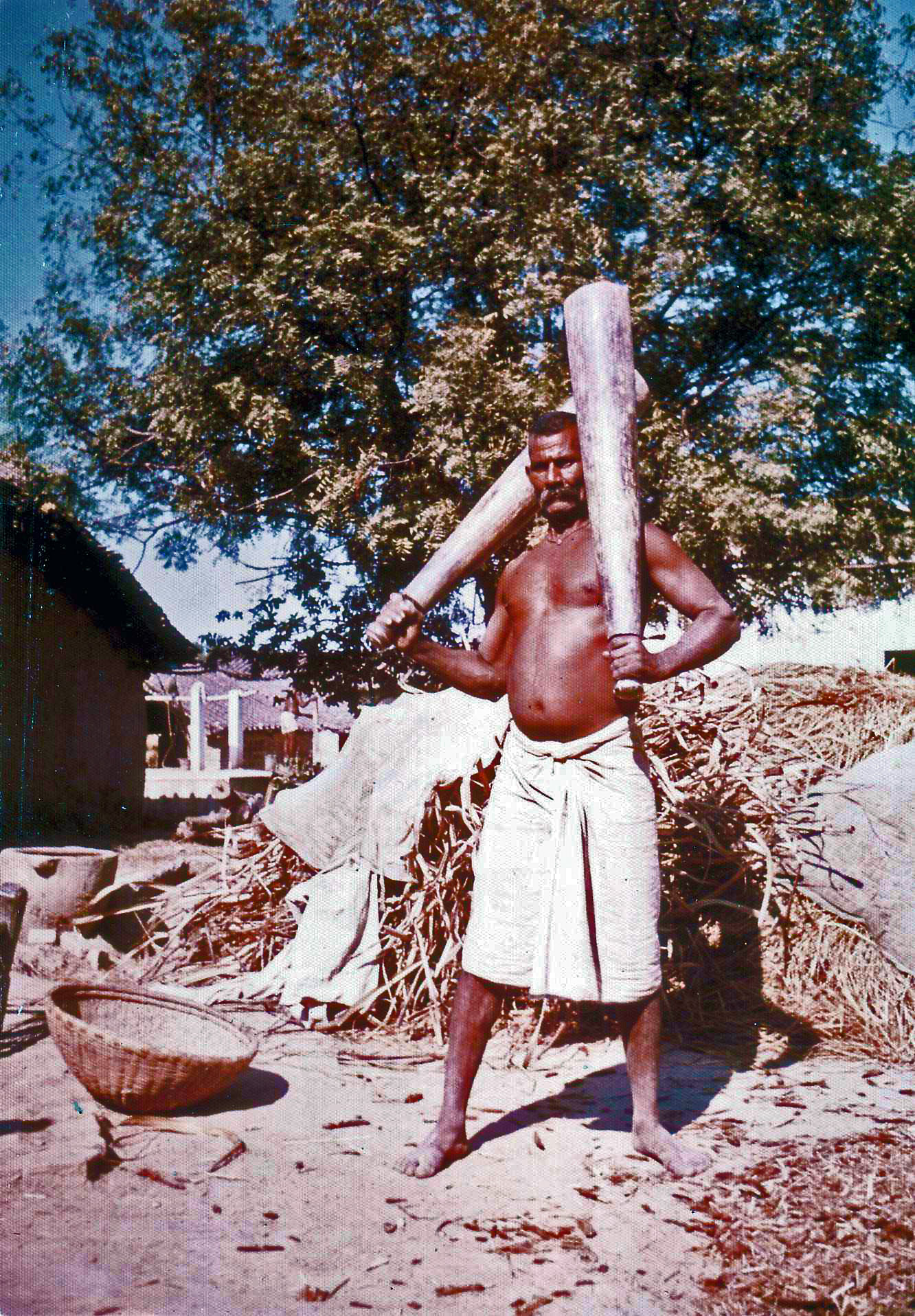
Indian wrestler exercising

Chi'ishi, a karate conditioning equipment and its exercise pattern was inspired by the gada and mudgar. The war mallets were also inspired by gada.

== Outside the Indian subcontinent ==
Gada is used by practitioners of silat martial arts in the Malay world. In Indonesia the meaning of "gada" has been expanded to refer to other impact weapons including the mace, the morning star, and the flail. However, several ethnic groups of Indonesia have their own version of gada. Traditional Indonesian gada are generally shaped more like Persian meel club than Indian gada. This is because the iron used to make gada in pre-modern Indonesia, called besi khurasani, was imported from Khorasan. Local gada are often coated in an alloy called besi kuning, which is believed to possess magical power.

== See also ==
- Mace (bludgeon)
