= Jabbowal =

- Village
- Location in Punjab, India Jabbowal (India)
- Coordinates: 31.187637°N 75.160375°E
- Country: India
- State: Punjab
- District: Kapurthala

Government
  - Type: Panchayati raj (India)
  - Body: Gram panchayat

Languages
  - Official: Punjabi
  - Other spoken: Hindi
- Time zone: UTC+5:30 (IST)
- PIN: 144629
- Telephone code: 01822
- ISO 3166 code: IN-PB
- Vehicle registration: PB-09
- Website: kapurthala.gov.in

Jabbowal is a village in Sultanpur Lodhi Tehsil in Kapurthala district of Punjab State, India. It is located 5 kilometres (3.1 mi) from Sultanpur Lodhi, 29 kilometres (18 mi) away from district headquarter Kapurthala. The village is administered by a Sarpanch who is an elected representative of the village as per the constitution of India and Panchayati raj (India).

== List of cities near the village ==
- Bhulath
- Kapurthala
- Phagwara
- Sultanpur Lodhi

== Air travel connectivity ==
The closest International airport to the village is Sri Guru Ram Dass Jee International Airport.
