= Dungtláng =

Dungtláng Old Dungtlang
- village
- Location in Mizoram, India Dungtláng (India)
- Coordinates: 23.206095°N 93.239998°E
- Country: India
- State: Mizoram
- District: Champhai
- Elevation: 1,280 m (4,200 ft)

Population (2011)
  - Total: 858

Languages
  - Official: Mizo
- Time zone: UTC+5:30 (IST)
- PIN: 796321
- Coastline: 0 kilometres (0 mi)
- Nearest city: Champhai
- Sex ratio: 982 females per 1000 males ♂/♀
- Literacy: 93.44%

Dungtláng is an Indian village within Khawbung rural development block in Champhai district, Mizoram.
