= Hindu squat =

Indian calisthenic exercise

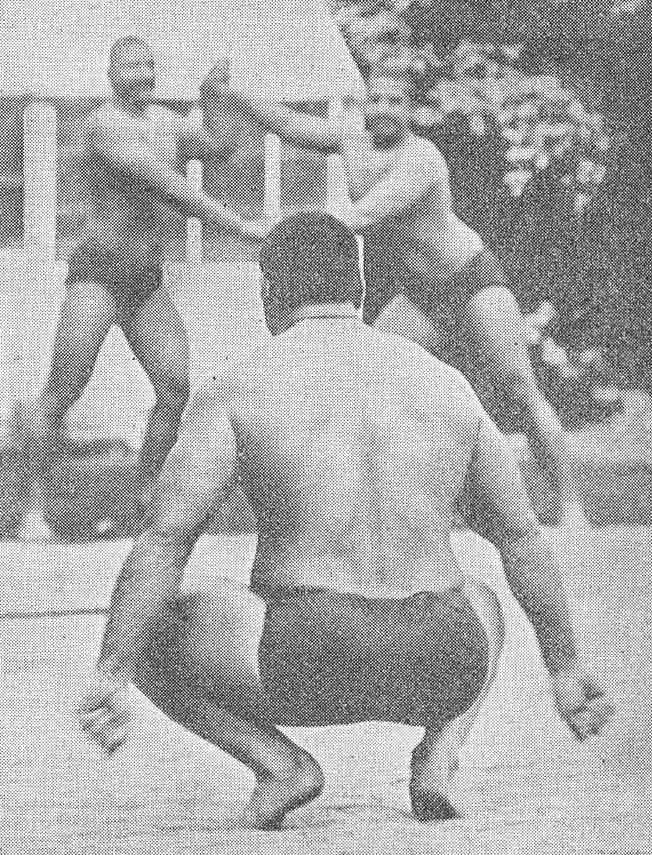
The Great Gama performing a Hindu squat

The Hindu squat, also called baithak or bethak (Hindi, from Sanskrit baiṭhaka, "seat"), is a calisthenics exercise involving a dynamic squat with the knees over the toes. Along with the Hindu push-up, it originated in Indian wrestling and was adopted in martial arts and combat sports by figures such as Bruce Lee and Karl Gotch.

== Technique ==
The user stands with his feet hip-width apart. He then bends his knees to squat down, lifting the heels and keeping his weight on the balls of his feet, while keeping the back straight. Afterwards, he pushes to rise back up to starting position, planting heels again and staightening the legs. Additionally, the arms can execute their own movement, being kept extended straight in front of the chest and brinding them down or back while squatting down, then swinging them back forward while rising.

The technque works not only the legs' flexion-extension, but also balance, stamina and strength of ankles and feet. Compared to conventional squats, where the knee must not advance beyond the toes, Hindu squats put considerable pressure over the knee joint, making it not recommendable for users with knee injuries. Even users with healthy knees are advised to start with few repetitions in order to gain strength to prevent injuries. It is also possible to bend the knees mid way instead of deep down to reduce pressure.

== History ==
The move is strongly associated with the Hindu push-up. Trainees in the wrestling style of pehlwan perform traditionally 1,000 squats and 100 push-ups everyday. One of the most famed wrestlers of the sport, The Great Gama, was known for performing 4,000 Hindu squats before having breakfast, followed by at least 2,000 push-ups later. Gama increased these numbers as he advanced in his career, and at 50 years old he was still able to reach 6,000 and 4,000 respectively. Bruce Lee adopted these movements for his own training regime.

Bhagabati Ghosh, father to Indian bodybuilder Bishnu Charan Ghosh and yogi Paramahansa Yogananda, mixed rounds of dand, baithak and gada swings, along with hours of yogic breathing exercises of pranayama and mahamudra (a practice combining pranayama with asanas). Yogananda adopted part of this routine, along with the kettlebell designed by popular wrestler and bodybuilder Eugen Sandow.

Legendary wrestler Karl Gotch also used this move. He would perform 300 Hindu squats to warm up in his training sessions, and, in one occasion, he performed 9,001 of them throughout four hours and half as a personal challenge. Everybody who wished to become his trainee was demanded to do 500, along with 250 Hindu push-ups and three minutes of bridge. His apprentice Hiro Matsuda, known for training wrestlers like Hulk Hogan and Lex Luger, also regarded Hindu squats as vital to gain strength and explosivity and increase lung capacity. The final exam of his wrestling school required to perform 1,000 squats followed by 500 squats while jumping.

== See also ==
- Hindu push-up
- Squat (exercise)
- Utkatasana

== Bibliography ==
- Armstrong, Jerome (2020). Calcutta Yoga. Pan Macmillan. ISBN 9781529048117.
- Draeger, Donn; Smith, Robert (1980). Comprehensive Asian Fighting Arts. Kodansha International. p. 148-149.
- Greer, John Michael (2023). The Secret of the Five Rites: In Search of a Lost Western Tradition of Inner Alchemy. Aeon Books Limited. ISBN 9781801520966.
- Little, John (2015). Bruce Lee: The Art of Expressing the Human Body. Turtle Publishing. ISBN 9781462917891.
- Luger, Lex (2013). Wrestling with the Devil: The True Story of a World Champion Professional Wrestler -- His Reign, Ruin, and Redemption. Tyndale House Publishers. ISBN 9781414385716.
- Hendricks, Barrett (2022). The Way of Joega: Health, Fitness and Radiant Well-Being for Regular Joes and Janes. Gatekeeper Press. p. 88-92. ISBN 9781662918391.
- Matysik, Larry (2013). 50 Greatest Professional Wrestlers of All Time: The Definitive Shoot. ECW Press. ISBN 9781770903050.
- Presto, Greg (2022). The Workout Bucket List: Over 300 Life-Changing Races, Epic Challenges, and Incredible Hikes, Bikes, Lifts, and Runs Around the World, in Your Gym, Or Right in Your Living Room. Running Press. ISBN 9780762472086.
- Regal, William (2010). Walking a Golden Mile. Simon and Schuster. ISBN 9781451604474.
- Shannon, Jake (2011). Say Uncle! Catch-as-catch-can Wrestling and the Roots of Ultimate Fighting, Pro Wrestling, & Modern Grappling. ECW Press. p. 25. ISBN 9781550229615.
- Zehra, Kaneez (1993). Training of India Police Service. Ashish Publishing House. ISBN 9788170245872.
