= The Great Gama =

Wrestler from British India (1878–1960)

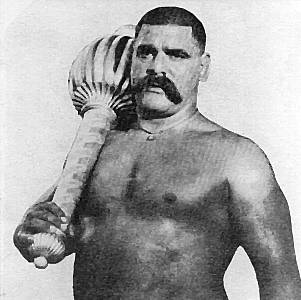
- The Great Gama c. 1916

Personal information
- Born: Ghulam Mohammed Baksh Butt; 22 May 1878 Jabbowal, Punjab, British India (now in Punjab, India)
- Died: 23 May 1960 (aged 82) Lahore, West Pakistan, Pakistan (now in Punjab, Pakistan)
- Family: Imam Baksh Pahalwan (brother); Kalsoom Nawaz Sharif (granddaughter); Maryam Nawaz (great-granddaughter)

Professional wrestling career
- Ring name: Gama Pahalwan
- Billed height: 5 ft 8 in (173 cm)
- Billed weight: 250 lb (110 kg)

Ghulam Mohammed Baksh Butt (22 May 1878 – 23 May 1960), commonly known by the title Rustam-e-Hind, (Note: lit. 'Rustam of Hind' transl. Champion of India.) Rustam-e-Zamana, and by the ring names - The Great Gama and Gama Pehelwan, was a Pehlwani wrestler and strongman in British India and later, Pakistan. In the early 20th century, he was an undefeated wrestling champion of British India.

Born in 1878 into a Kashmiri Muslim family of wrestlers in Amritsar, Punjab, Gama was awarded a version of the World Heavyweight Championship on 15 October 1910. Undefeated in a career spanning more than 52 years, he is considered one of the greatest wrestlers of all time. After the Partition of India in 1947, Gama migrated to Pakistan, where he died in Lahore on 23 May 1960.

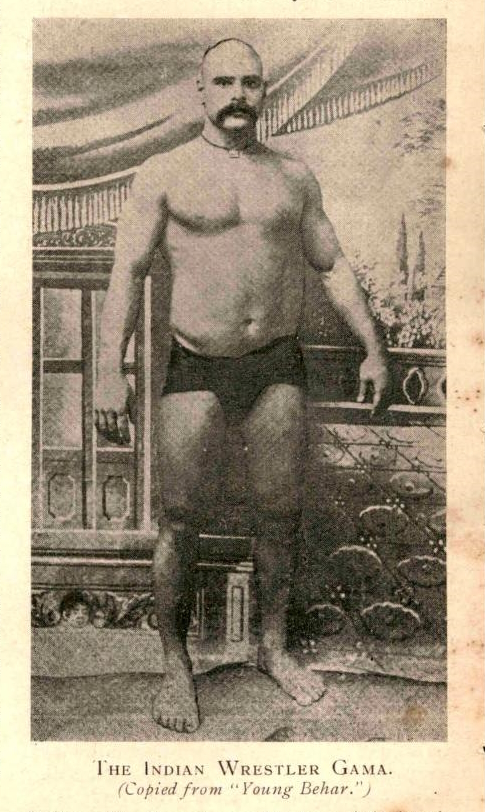
c. 1910

The prominent members of Great Gama Family include Zubair Jhara Pehalwan, Nasir Bholu, Sohail Pehlwan, Abid Pehlwan, Kalsoom Nawaz, Bilal Yasin (Ex-Federal Minister), Ibraz Butt (Youth Parliamentarian, Secretary of Information) and Moazzam Zubair (son of Jahara).

== Early life ==
Ghulam Mohammed Baksh Butt was born on 22 May 1878 in Jabbowal, a village in the Amritsar district of the Punjab Province of British India (now in the Kapurthala district of Punjab, India), into an ethnic Kashmiri Muslim family of traditional wrestlers, who had long settled in the Punjab region. Gama's family belonged to the Butt caste and claimed descent from the Bhat clan of Kashmiri Pandits, who had converted from Hinduism to Islam generations ago. After his father’s sudden death when Gama was six, he was raised by his maternal grandfather and then his uncle Ida Pahalwan, who vowed to fulfill Aziz’s wish of making Gama the world’s greatest wrestler. Deeply affected by his father’s death, Gama was motivated by the idea that disciplined training.

He was first noticed at the age of ten, in 1888, when he entered a strongman competition held in Jodhpur, which included many gruelling exercises such as squats. The contest was attended by more than four hundred wrestlers and Gama was among the last fifteen; he was named the winner by the Maharaja of Jodhpur due to his young age. Gama was bedridden for a week afterward.

Gama was subsequently taken into training by the Maharaja of Datia a princely state in Bundelkhand. As per the tradition, he was subjected to a rigorous training regime which included thousands of Hindu push-ups and Hindu squats everyday.

== Career ==
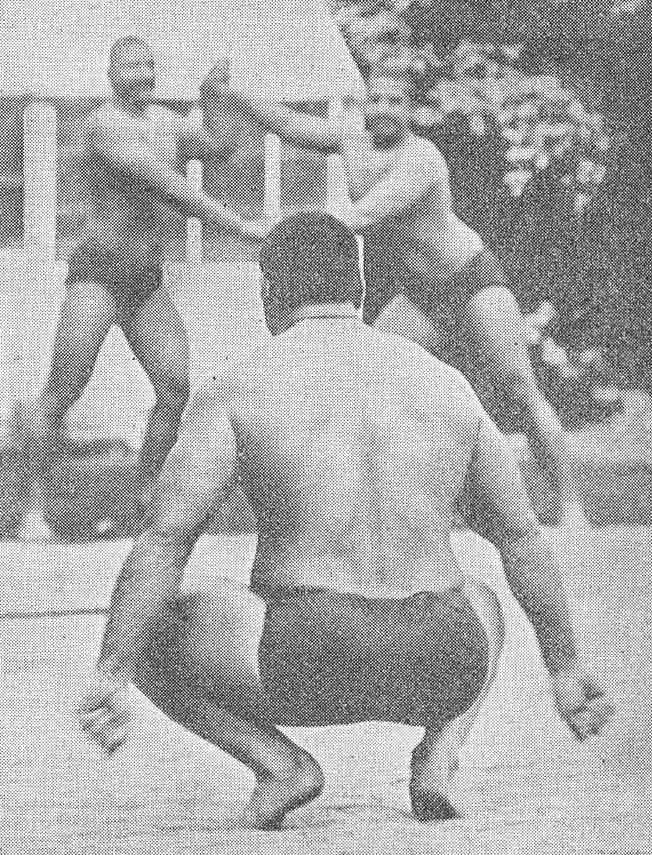
Gama performing a baithak

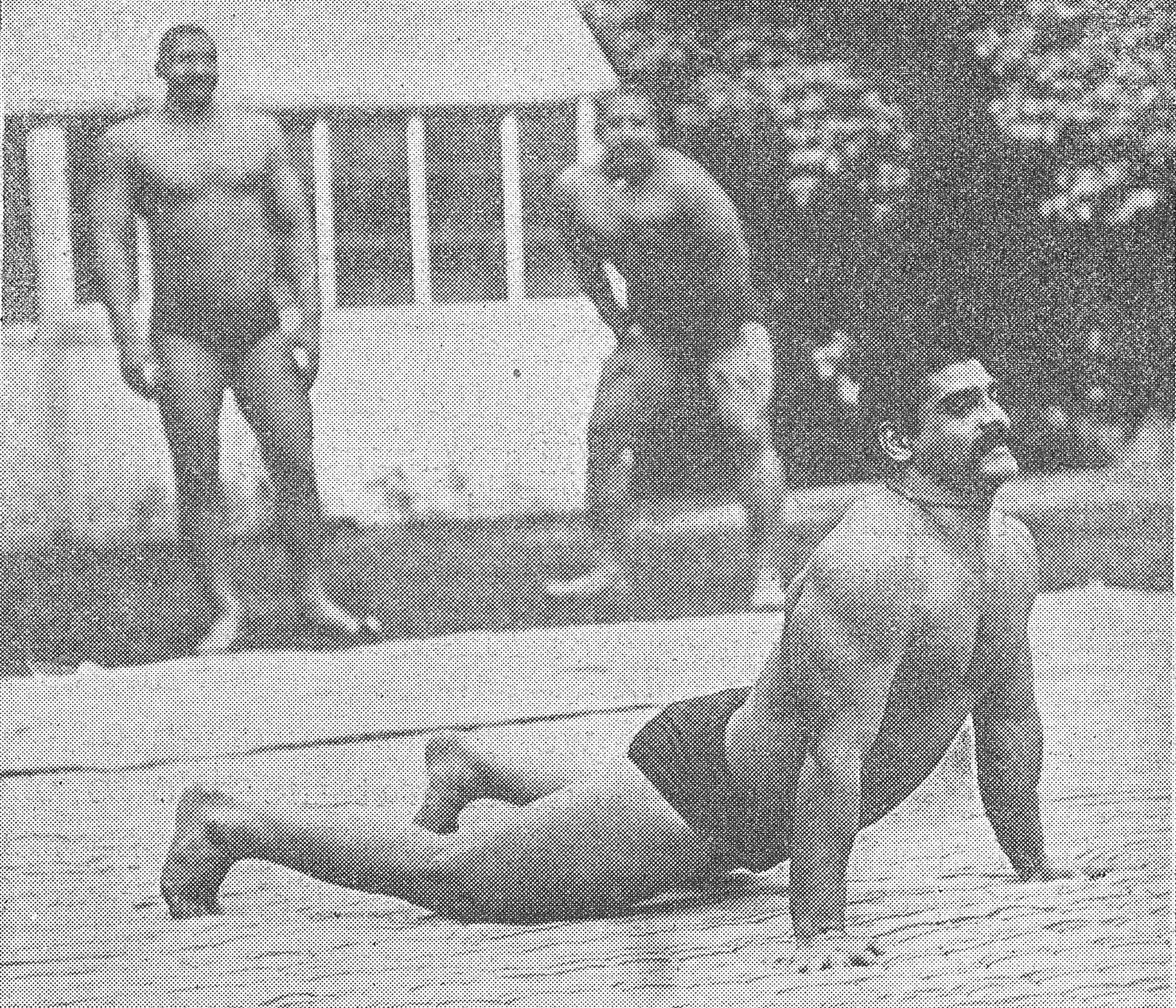
Gama performing a dand

=== First encounter with Raheem Bakhsh Sultaniwala ===
In 1895, at the age of 17, Gama challenged the then Rustam-e-Hind, middle-aged Raheem Bakhsh Sultani Wala, another ethnic Kashmiri wrestler from Gujranwala. At about 7 feet (2.1 m) tall, with a very impressive win–loss record, Raheem was expected to easily defeat the 5-foot-7-inch (1.70 m) Gama. Raheem's only drawback was his age as he was much older than Gama, and near the end of his career. The bout continued for hours and eventually ended in a draw. The contest with Raheem was the turning point in Gama's career. After that, he was looked upon as the next contender for the title of Rustam-e-Hind or the Indian Wrestling Championship. In the first bout Gama remained defensive, but in the second bout he went on the offensive. Despite severe bleeding from his nose and ears, he managed to deal a great deal of damage to Raheem Bakhsh.

By 1910, Gama had defeated all the prominent Indian wrestlers who faced him except the champion, Raheem Bakhsh Sultani Wala. At this time, he focused his attention on the rest of the world. Accompanied by his younger brother Imam Baksh Pahalwan, Gama sailed to England to compete with the Western wrestlers but could not gain instant entry, because of his lower height.

=== Tournament in London ===
In London, Gama issued a challenge that he could throw any three wrestlers of any weight class in thirty minutes. This announcement however was seen as a bluff by the wrestlers and their wrestling promoter R. B. Benjamin. For a long time, no one came forward to accept the challenge. To break the ice, Gama presented another challenge to specific heavy weight wrestlers. He challenged Stanislaus Zbyszko and Frank Gotch, that he would either beat them or pay them the prize money and go home. The first professional wrestler to take his challenge was the American Ben Roller. In the bout, Gama pinned Roller in 1 minute 40 seconds the first time, and in 9 minutes 10 seconds the other. On the second day, he defeated 12 wrestlers and thus gained entry to the official tournament. These victories ultimately secured him a match against Stanislaus Zbyszko. and the bout was set for 10 September 1910. Zbyszko was then regarded among the premier wrestlers in the world; and he would then take on the mammoth challenge of India's feared Great Gama, an undefeated champion who had been unsuccessful in his attempts to lure Frank Gotch into a match. And so, on 10 September 1910, Zbyszko faced the Great Gama in the finals of the John Bull World Championships in London. The match was worth £250 in prize money and the John Bull Belt. Within a minute, Zbyszko was taken down and remained in that position for the remaining 2 hours and 35 minutes of the match. There were a few brief moments when Zbyszko would get up, but he just ended back down in his previous position. Through this defensive strategy of hugging the mat in order to nullify Great Gama's greatest strengths, Zbyszko wrestled the Indian legend to a draw after nearly three hours of grappling, though Zbyszko's lack of tenacity angered many of the fans in attendance.

Nevertheless, Zbyszko still became one of the few wrestlers to ever meet the Great Gama without going down in defeat; The two men were set to face each other again on 17 September 1910. On that date, Zbyszko failed to show up and Gama was announced the winner by default. He was awarded the prize and the John Bull Belt. Receiving this belt entitled Gama to be called Rustam-e-Zaman or World Champion but not the lineal champion of the world as he hadn't defeated Zbyszko in the ring.

=== Bouts against American and European champions ===
During this tour, Gama defeated some of the most respected grapplers in the world, "Doc" Ben Roller of United States, Maurice Deriaz of Switzerland, Johann Lemm (the European Champion) of Switzerland, and Jesse Peterson (World Champion) from Sweden. In the match against Roller, Gama threw "Doc" 13 times in the 15-minute match. Gama now issued a challenge to the rest of those who laid claim to the World Champion's Title, including Japanese Judo champion Taro Miyake, George Hackenschmidt of Russia and Frank Gotch of United States – each declined his invitation to enter the ring to face him. At one point, to face some type of competition, Gama offered to fight twenty English wrestlers, one after another. He announced that he would defeat all of them or pay out prize money, but still no one would take up his challenge. As weeks became months, Gama and his entourage waited in London. April gave way to May, May to June, and June to July. The 'Health & Strength' magazine explained the impasse: Gama had received numerous offers if he would agree to “go down” — to lose ina scripted or pre-arranged bout. Gama appeared not to understand the notion that the staged professional bouts were common in Europe.

=== Final encounter with Raheem Bakhsh Sultani Wala ===
Shortly after his return from England, Gama faced Raheem Bakhsh Sultani Wala in Allahabad. This bout eventually ended the long struggle between the two pillars of Indian wrestling of that time in favour of Gama and he won the title of Rustam-e-Hind or the lineal Champion of India. Later in his life when asked about who was his strongest opponent, Gama replied, "Raheem Bakhsh Sultani Wala".

After beating Raheem Bakhsh Sultani Wala, Gama faced Pandit Biddu, who was one of the best wrestlers in India of that time (1916), and beat him.

On 17 January 1919, in Lahore, Indian wrestler Ghulam Mohiuddin (also known as Khalifa Ghulam Mohiuddin or by his title "Aftab-e-Hind", the Sun of India) faced Gama in a highly anticipated match held at Serai Data Ganj Bakhsh, Bhati Darwaza. The contest lasted two hours and fifteen minutes before ending in a draw. Ghulam Mohiuddin was considered one of the few wrestlers at par with Gama and was famous for his tactical skill and versatility, having previously toured Europe and adapted quickly to Greco-Roman wrestling.

In 1922, during a visit to India, the Edward VIII presented Gama with a silver mace.

=== Rematch with Zbyszko ===
Gama did not have any opponents until 1927, when it was announced that Gama and Zbyszko would face each other again. They met in Patiala in January 1928. Entering the bout, Zbyszko "showed a strong build of body and muscle" and Gama, it was reported "looked much thinner than usual". However, he managed to overpower the former easily and won the bout inside a minute, winning the Indian version of the lineal World Wrestling Championship. Following the bout, Zbyszko praised him, calling him a "tiger".

At forty-eight years old he was now known as the "great wrestler" of India.

=== 1929 onwards ===
After defeating Zbyszko, Gama beat Jesse Petersen in February 1929. The bout lasted only one and a half minutes.

In the same year, Gama fought memorable fight against Jatindra Charan Guho at Park Circus, Kolkata. After a stirring fight which showcased all the moves of Indian wrestling, the older Guha finally lost on a technicality.

In the 1940s he was invited by the Nizam of Hyderabad and defeated all his fighters. The Nizam then sent him to face the wrestler Balram Heeraman Singh Yadav(THE LION FROM HYDERABAD), who was never defeated in his life.The fight was very long, Gama was unable to defeat Heeraman and eventually neither wrestler won. After the independence and Partition of India in 1947, Gama moved to Pakistan. Although Gama did not retire until 1952, he failed to find any other opponents. After his retirement he trained his nephew Bholu Pahalwan, who held the Pakistani wrestling championship for almost 20 years.

== Final years ==
After the Partition of India in 1947, Gama moved to Pakistan. During the Hindu–Muslim riots that broke out at the time of partition, Gama saved hundreds of Hindus from a Muslim mob in Lahore. Although Gama did not retire until 1952, he failed to find any other opponents. Some other sources say he wrestled until 1955. After his retirement, he trained his nephew Bholu Pahalwan, who held the Pakistani wrestling championship for almost 20 years.

His final days were difficult; he had five sons and four daughters and all the sons died young. When his youngest son Jalaluddin died in 1945 at the age of just thirteen, Gama was heartbroken and lost the power of speech for some days. He migrated to Pakistan at partition and tried his hand at different unsuccessful ventures including a bus service in Karachi called the "Gama Transport Service". Gama was given land and monthly pension by the government and supported his medical expenses until his death. Gama was also awarded the president medal for the Pride of Performance, after suffering from high blood pressure from 1952 onwards, he died in Lahore, Pakistan on 23 May 1960 after a period of illness.

Kulsoom Nawaz, politician and wife of Prime Minister of Pakistan Nawaz Sharif, was the granddaughter of Gama.

== Legacy ==
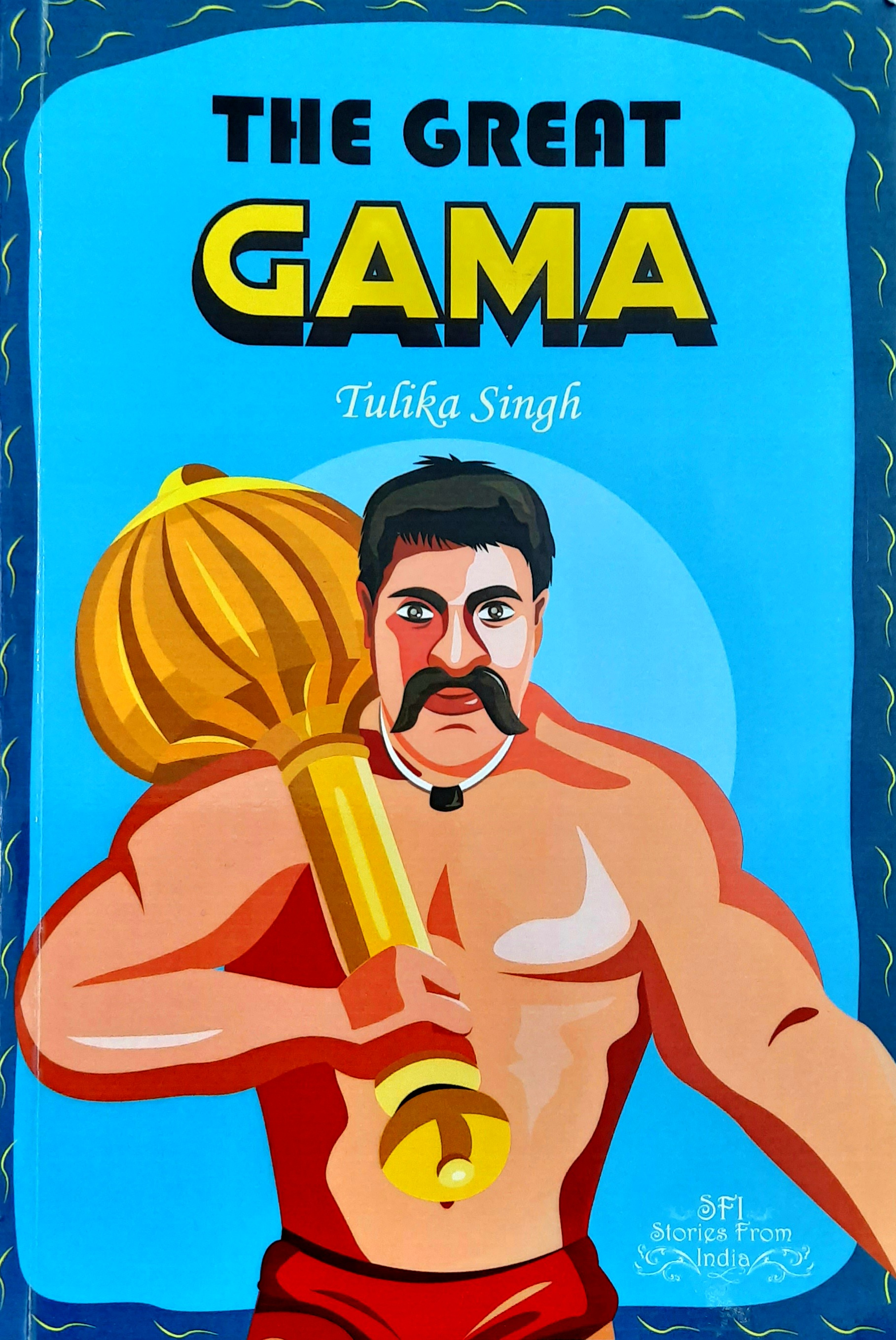
The Great Gama – Title page of the book

Gama fought and won over five thousand matches. Bruce Lee was an avid follower of Gama's training routine. Lee read articles about Gama and how he employed his exercises to build his legendary strength for wrestling, and Lee quickly incorporated them into his own routine. The training routines Lee used included "the cat stretch", and "the squat" (known as "baithak", and also known as the "deep-knee bend.").

Today, a doughnut-shaped exercise disc called Hasli weighing 100 kg, used by him for squats and pushups, is housed at the Netaji Subhas National Institute of Sports (NIS) Museum at Patiala.

On 22 May 2022, search engine Google commemorated Gama with a Doodle on his 144th birth anniversary. Google commented: "Gama’s legacy continues to inspire modern day fighters. Even Bruce Lee is a known admirer and incorporates aspects of Gama's conditioning into his own training routine!"

== Championships and accomplishments ==
- International Professional Wrestling Hall of Fame
  - Class of 2021
- George Tragos/Lou Thesz Professional Wrestling Hall of Fame
  - Class of 2007
- Professional Wrestling Hall of Fame and Museum
  - Class of 2015
- Other
  - John Bull World Championship

== See also ==
- The Great Khali
