= Hindu push-up =

Indian calisthenic exercise

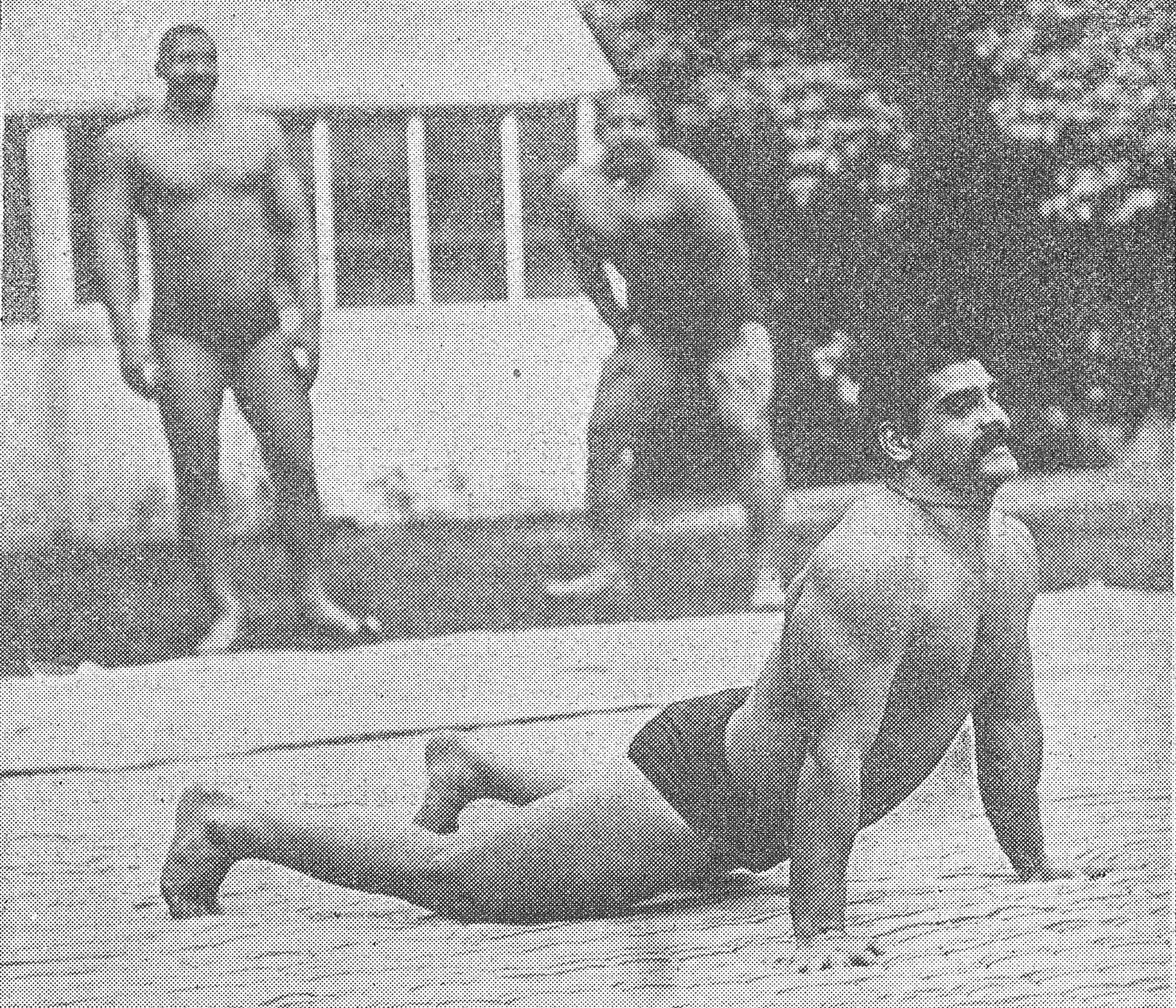
The Great Gama in midst of a Hindu push-up.

The Hindu push-up, also known as dand (Hindi, from Sanskrit दण्ड daṇḍa, "staff"), is a calisthenics exercise which involves performing a push-up while transitioning between the yoga stances known as downward dog and cobra. It is a complex exercise, working abdominals, pectorals, triceps, deltoids, serratus and shoulder girdle.

The technique has a long time association with martial arts and combat sports, having its origin in the ancient wrestling traditions of the Indian subcontinent. It was adopted by Bruce Lee, Karl Gotch and many practitioners of judo and wrestling. It has many names, including rock and roll push-up, judo push-up or as Lee called it, cat stretch.

The Hindu push-up is related to the yogic sequence of Sun Salutation, which also originates in Indian wrestling. It is also associated to another calisthenic exercise of Indian wrestling, the Hindu squat or baithak.

== Technique ==
The user stands on hands and feet and raises hips until his body forms a inverted V shape with the body. Keeping his chin up, he bends his elbows and drop his chin towards the floor, after which he swoops his hips under while swinging his chest and head up, raising the head and straightening his arms. Afterwards, the user pushes up with his hip to return to the initial stance.

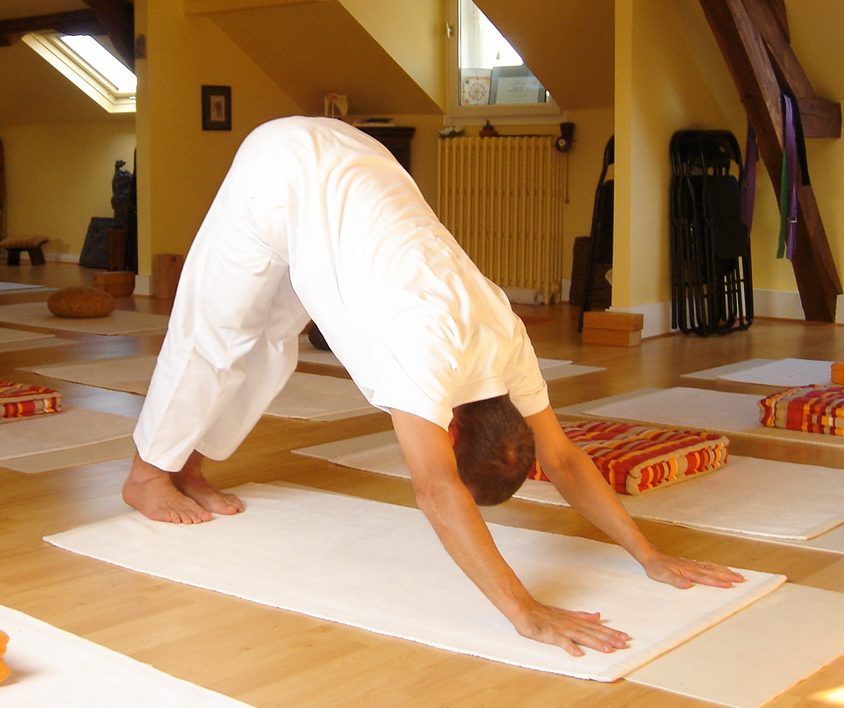
Downward Dog or Adho mukha svasana

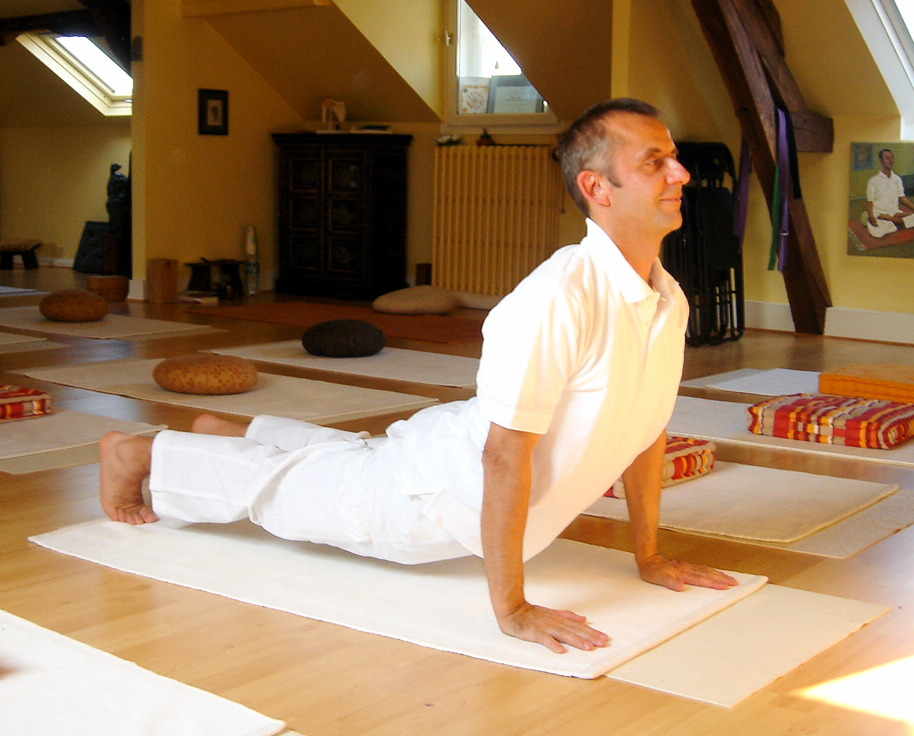
Cobra or Bhujangasana

In a variation of higher intensity known as dive bomber push-up, the user does not return to the initial position by pushing his hips up with his arms straightened, but by bending his elbows and reversing the whole movement backwards, effectively performing two push-ups in one.

== History ==
Variation where elbows are not bent, used whenever the intensity of the move is too high for the user.

Hindu push-ups have been part of Indian wrestling tradition since at least the 19th century. In the style known as pehlwani, wrestler perform thousands of them in the training arena (akhara) to gain strength and endurance. The Great Gama, a champion of the sport and one of the most famed wrestlers in history, performed 2,000-4,000 of these push-ups every day, aside from 5,000 Hindu squats named called bethak or baithak.

Bhagabati Ghosh, father to yogi Paramahansa Yogananda and Indian bodybuilder Bishnu Charan Ghosh, mixed rounds of dand, baithak and gada swings, along with hours of yogic breathing exercises of pranayama and mahamudra (a practice combining pranayama with asanas). Yogananda adopted part of this routine, along with the kettlebell designed by popular wrestler and bodybuilder Eugen Sandow.

Wrestler Karl Gotch, known by his influence on professional wrestling and mixed martial arts in the United States and Japan, favored Indian calisthenics over weightlifting on the reason that wrestler required more flexibility than volume, and accordingly included many Indian push-ups in his regime. He also used a variation called half-moon push-up.

== See also ==
- Hindu squat
- Dandasana, staff pose in yoga
- Push-up

== Bibliography ==
- Armstrong, Jerome (2020). Calcutta Yoga. Pan Macmillan. ISBN 9781529048117.
- Bharadwaj, S. (1896). Vyayama Dipika: Elements of Gymnastic Exercises, Indian System. Caxton Press.
- Greer, John Michael (2023). The Secret of the Five Rites: In Search of a Lost Western Tradition of Inner Alchemy. Aeon Books Limited. ISBN 9781801520966.
- Hauser, Beatrix (2013). Yoga Traveling: Bodily Practice in Transcultural Perspective. Springer International Publishing. ISBN 9783319003153.
- Lee, Bruce (1975). The Tao of Jeet Kune Do. Ohara Publications. p. 29.
- Pourcelot, Christophe (2018). La bible de la musculation au poids de corps: Tome 1 - Guide des mouvements: 480 exercices détaillés (in French). Amphora. ISBN 9782757601983.
- Presto, Greg (2022). The Workout Bucket List: Over 300 Life-Changing Races, Epic Challenges, and Incredible Hikes, Bikes, Lifts, and Runs Around the World, in Your Gym, Or Right in Your Living Room. Running Press. ISBN 9780762472086.
- Shannon, Jake (2011). Say Uncle! Catch-as-catch-can Wrestling and the Roots of Ultimate Fighting, Pro Wrestling, & Modern Grappling. ECW Press. p. 25. ISBN 9781550229615.
- Simmons, Joe (1982). The Warrior: Brief Studies in the Sources of Spiritual Mastery, Sport, and Military Power. University Press of America. ISBN 9780819122933.
- Speirs, Steve (2009). 7 Weeks to 100 Push-Ups: Strengthen and Sculpt Your Arms, Abs, Chest, Back and Glutes by Training to Do 100 Consecutive Push-Ups. Ulysses Press. p. 22. ISBN 9781569757079.
- Yeager, Selene (2011). The Men's Health Big Book of 15-Minute Workouts: A Leaner, Stronger Body--in 15 Minutes a Day!. Men's Health. ISBN 9781609617356.
