= Malakhra =

Ancient Sindhi form of wrestling

Malakhro (Sindhi: ملاکڙو) is an ancient Sindhi form of wrestling in Sindh, which dates back 5000 years. The match begins with both wrestlers tying a twisted cloth around the opponent's waist. Each one then holds onto the opponent's waist cloth and tries to throw him to the ground. Malakhra is one of the favorite sports among males in Sindh, Pakistan. Malakhara matches are generally held on holidays and Fridays and are a feature of all fairs and festivals. Rich feudal lords and influential persons maintain famous Malhoo (wrestlers) and organize matches for them. In the Pakistani region of Sindh, it is the provincial sport.

University of Sindh set up a Malakhro (wrestling) corner in the Institute of Sindhology. A traditional wrestling match is played anuuallu at the Urs of Lal Shahbaz Qalandar at Sehwan Sharif. Malakhiro stadium is proposed by Sindh Malh Association in Karachi.

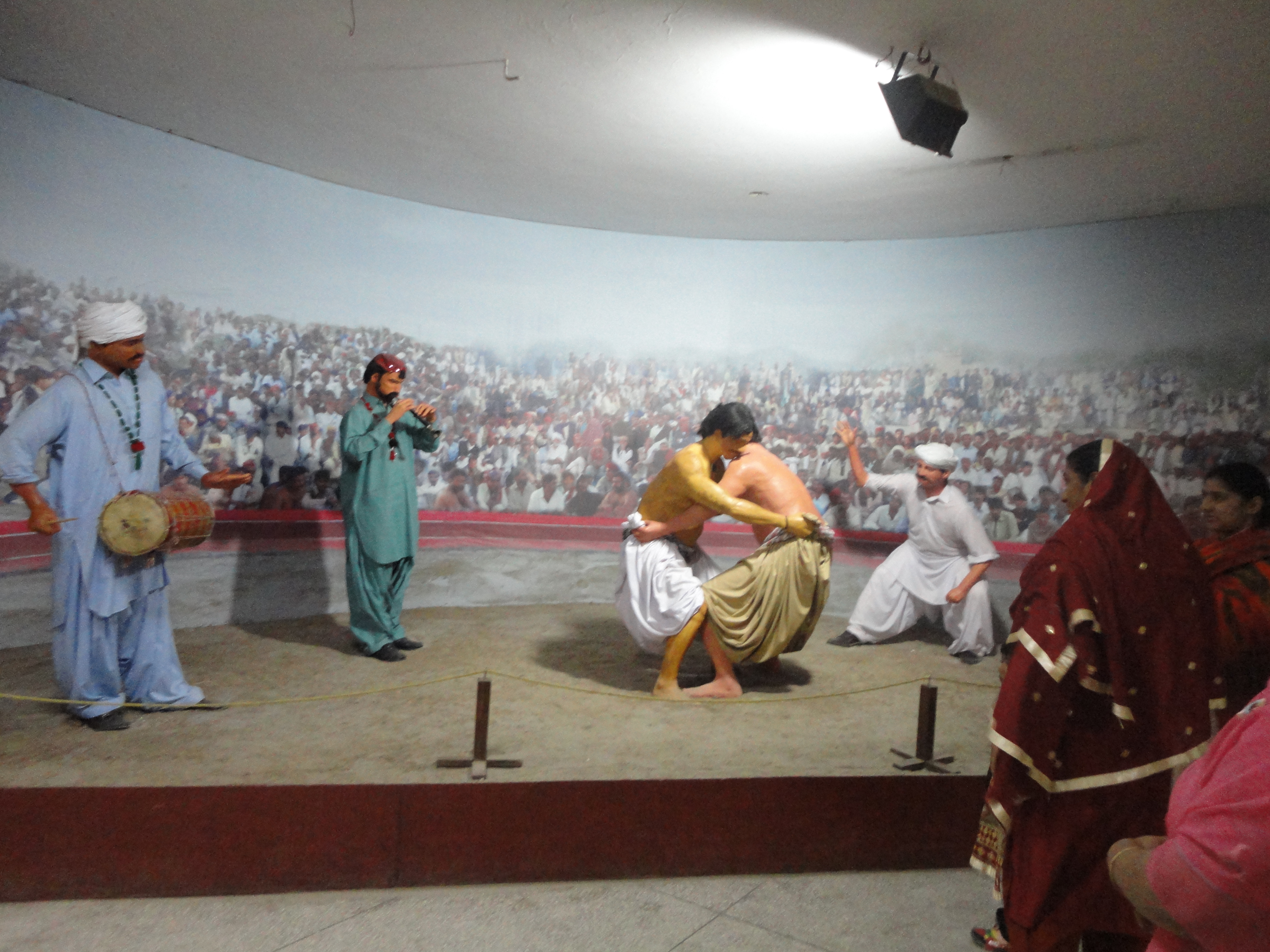
a model of Malakhiro at ISJ

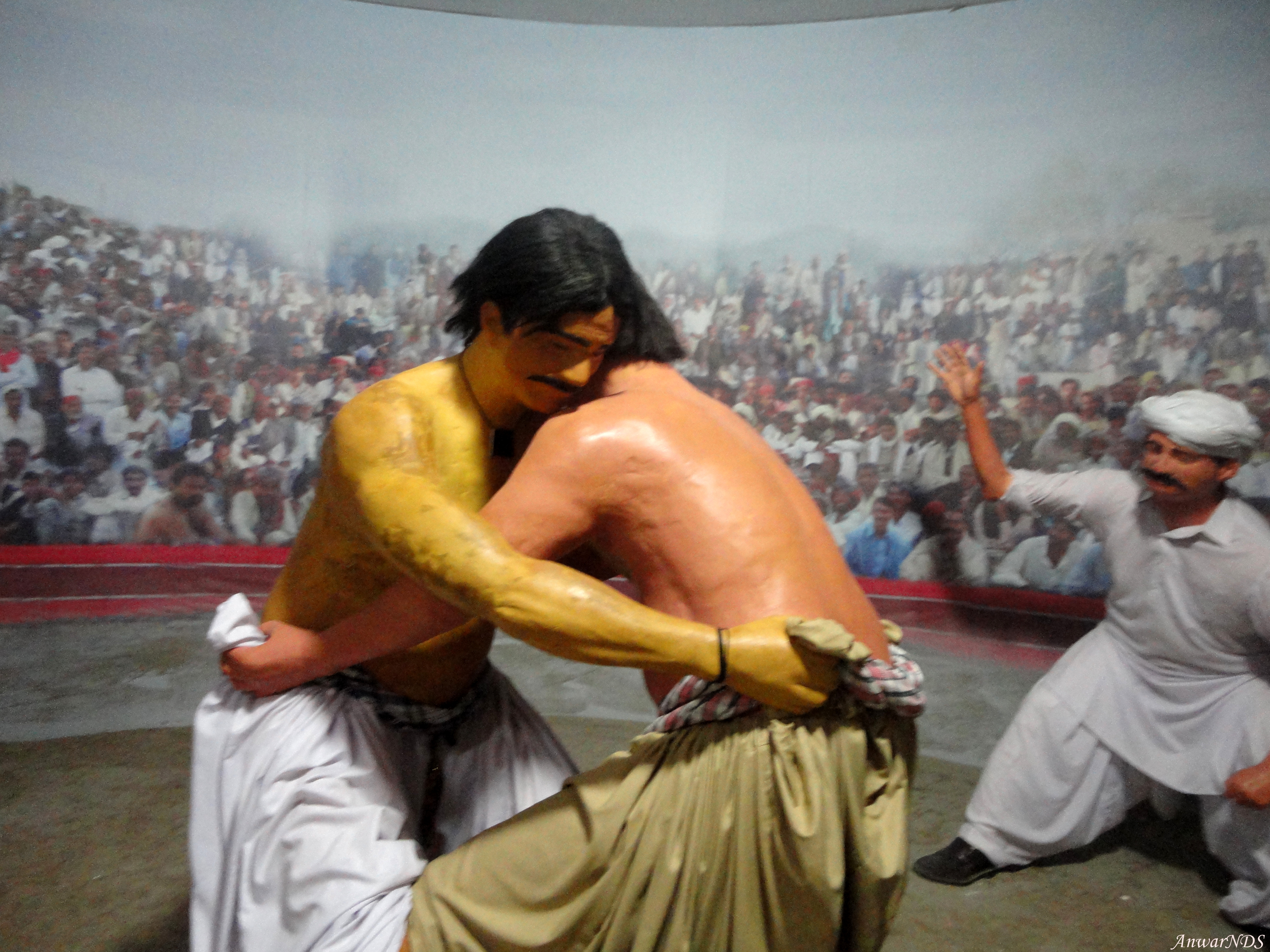
سنڌالاجي ۾ ملھ جو ماڊل Malh model at ISJ

== See also ==
- Wrestling in Pakistan
