= List of Pehlwani wrestlers =

This is a list of Pehlwani wrestlers who played in Olympics, Asian Games and State level Kesari tournaments.

== Olympic Freestyle Wrestlers ==
- Khashaba Dadasaheb Jadhav – 1952 Olympic bronze medalist, 1948 Olympics 6th place
- Mohammad Bashir – 1960 Olympic bronze medalist, 3-time Commonwealth Games gold medalist, 4-time Asian Games medalist

== Asian Games Freestyle Wrestlers ==
Bhim singh bhati – 1966 Commonwealth Gold medalist in 100 kg

- Chandgiram – 1970 Asian Games gold medalist
- Bharat Kesari Gama Pehalwan – Asian Games medalist

== Other prominent South Asian wrestlers ==
- Krishan Kumar Bhaprodia – Olympic participant, Hind Kesari 1986, Rustam-e-Hind, 3 Times National Champion, 3 Times Army Service Champion, Jawahar Kesari*
- Pandit Brahmdev Mishra – Lion of India, who defeated World Champion Dara Singh within few minutes in Kolkata
- Pandit Ram Narayan Mishra – Lion of Uttar Pradesh
- Akram Pahalwan – son of the wrestling legend Imam Baksh Pahalwan
- Aslam Pahlwan – also trained by Mama Moti Singh
- Bholu Brothers – illustrious Pehlwan Brothers (Bholu, Aslam, Goga, Akram and Azam)
- Mehar din pahlwan – Rustam-e-Hind, a great wrestler openly challenged all so called top wrestlers of his time and openly double challenged Chandgi Ram and Dara Singh
- Mangla Rai – Rustam-e-Hind
- Goga Pahalwan – son of the wrestling legend Imam Baksh Pahalwan
- Great Gama
- Jaspal Singh Virk – wrestling Legend in India
- Gulam – accompanied the late Pandit Motilal Nehru to Paris in 1900 and defeated Cour-Derelli of Turkey
- Guru Hanuman – wrestler and coach
- Karim Bux – first wrestler to get into world headlines, when he defeated Tom Canon of England in 1892
- Kikkar Singh – Dev-e-Hind, known for his phenomenal chest and body
- Maruti Mane – Jakarta King 1962-1972
- Premnath Wrestler – Guru Premnath, Arjun Awardee 1972
- Rajkumar Baisla (Wrestler) – (Dhyan chand Awardee & Yash Bharti Award)
- Ramesh Kumar
- Uday Chand – Bronze Medalist World Wrestling championship
- Gama Pehalwan – Bharat Kesari and National Champion
