= Bholu Brothers =

Pakistani wrestlers

The Bholu Brothers were Pakistani wrestlers of Kashmiri origin. They were prominent members of The Great Gama wrestling family, a lineage with a history dating back to 1850. Among the notable members of this family are Bholu Pahalwan, Azam Pahalwan, Aslam Pahalwan, Akram Pahalwan, and Goga Pahalwan. The Bholu Brothers were the sons of Imam Baksh Pahalwan, a Rustam-e-Hind (Champion Wrestler of India), and the nephews of the renowned Gama Pahalwan. The family's involvement in wrestling included the ownership and operation of several wrestling gyms.

== Early days ==
The Great Bholu's gym, known as Dar-ul-Sehat, is located in a building in the City of Karachi. It was a muddy wrestling arena within a courtyard surrounded by wooden benches. Pakistan's first prime minister, Liaquat Ali Khan, allotted this building to the Gama wrestling family to be used for training. It was once an akhara, or a traditional training hall where Deshi Kushti was practiced. The wrestling matches were known as Dangal, and were fought in a mud pit. The government of Pakistan, until Ayub Khan's regime, regularly provided a special grant to Bholu Pahalwan's family as recognition of their services to the sport. Before 1958, every city, town, and village in the country had its akhara. The sustained participation of wrestlers maintained the sport's vitality, and Bholu's legacy gained increased recognition.

During the period when wrestling was prominent in Pakistan, stadiums across the country consistently attracted large audiences. Spectators also frequently gathered in the streets to watch the competitions. During this era, the Bholu Brothers were particularly popular in the East, and were well-recognized within the Asian community as distinguished figures of the sport.

== Training ==
The brothers were trained by Gama Pahalwan, who was known as the Great Gama in the Indian Subcontinent, and remained a major figurehead of the wrestling scene within the region after independence in 1947. Bholu Pahalwan acquired the title of Rustam-e-Pakistan in 1949. His younger brother Aslam Pahalwan earned the Rustam-e-Punjab title in 1951. Azam was declared Rustam-e-Hind in 1953. Goga was better known as the Resident Champion. They were among the people who came to Lahore from Amritsar after independence. The Bholu Brothers are also mentioned in current discussions about wrestling.

== Notable wrestlers ==
=== Bholu Pahalwan ===
Bholu Pahalwan, born Manzoor Hussain in 1922, was the eldest son of Imam Baksh Pahalwan - Rustam-i-Hind (Champion Wrestler of India). He was the first wrestling champion of newly independent Pakistan.

Starting his career in British India, Bholu fought his first wrestling match in March 1939 at Minto Park (now called Iqbal Park), Lahore, against Ahmad Bakhsh. He defeated Mangal Singh and Tarraka before 1947. Bholu also defeated wrestlers from the West, including Karl Pojello, George Zbisko, Zbisko-II, Emil Koroshenko, Baron Von Heckzey, and Jeji Goldstein. He won the Rustam-e-Pakistan title in April 1949 by defeating the No. 1 Pakistani wrestler, Younus Gujranwalia of Punjab. The Governor General of Pakistan, Khwaja Nazimuddin, awarded him the Championship Mace. In 1962, the Pakistani President, Muhammad Ayub Khan, gave him the Pride of Performance Award.

In 1964, he was declared Rustam-e-Zaman (world champion) by the All Pakistan Wrestling Association, conditionally. In May 1967, he defeated the Anglo-French Champion, Henri Pierlot (Les Thornton) for the world title in London, England. In September 1967, Bholu was declared Rustam-e-Zaman by the All Pakistan Wrestling Association for the second time.

=== Aslam Pahalwan ===
Aslam Pahalwan (also known as "Achcha") (1927–1989) was the adopted son of The Great Gama, and played a role in the Pakistani wrestling faction. Aslam was known personally as a comical figure, which contrasted his wrestling persona and attitude within the ring. He weighed more than 300 pounds, and stood 6 ft 4 inches in height. He was trained in extreme wrestling environments by the so-called "Superman of Indian wrestling", Hamida Pahalwan. He participated in shoot bouts. He got a license in freestyle wrestling and Indian martial arts.

Aslam began his career before the independence of Pakistan. He gained fame by beating Kala Pehalwan, "the lion of Punjab". He won the Rustam-e-Punjab title in 1951 by beating a Pakistani wrestler known as Younus Pahalwan (a.k.a. Younus Gujranwalia) of Gujranwala. In 1953, he wrestled in Nairobi and defeated its champion, Mahender Singh. He also acquired the Commonwealth title in 1953. He became known throughout the world when he defeated the Empire Champion, Bert Assirati, in 1954. Aslam wrestled in Asia, the Far East, East Africa, Europe, South America, and the Middle East, and defeated some famous names, including George Gordienko, Sheik Ali, Roy Heffernan, and King Kong Czaya. He also defeated big names in Indian wrestling, such as Arjun Singh, Tiger Joginder Singh, Tarlok Singh, and Paul Vachon. According to Paul "Butcher" Vachon, all the matches that he had with the Bholu Brothers were shoots.

=== Azam Pahalawan ===
Azam Pehalwan Rustam-e-Hind was the Champion of Lahore and the Far East. He was a conventional wrestler, a Pahalwan who later adopted the freestyle professional wrestling. Azam (alias Raja) was born in 1925, in Amritsar, India. He was an introverted and religious person. He faced many grapplers in Pakistan, India, Kuwait, Muscat, Bahrain, Qatar, Kenya, Uganda, and South America. Azam was strong and flexible. Whenever thrown on the mat, he always landed on his feet. With a body weight of only 180 pounds, he could tackle super heavyweights such as Gora Singh and Baron Von Heckzey. In the United Kingdom, he defeated the American Champion, Ron Reed. In Suriname, he defeated the wrestling champion and Karate buff, Antel Haiti (Geisingh). He also vanquished well-known wrestlers such as Jeji Goldstein, George Penchef, Big Bill Verna, Zebra Kid, Ron Harrison, Bloorma, Tiger Joginder, and Arjun Singh.

=== Akram Pahalawan ===
Akram Pehalwan, also known as Akki, practiced both earthen pit wrestling and boxing-style wrestling. Born around 1930 in Amritsar, Punjab, India, he weighed approximately 250 pounds, and stood 6 feet tall in his prime. In 1953, he was given the name "Double Tiger" in East Africa after his victories there. He defeated Ugandan Champion Idi Amin in Kampala and won against all his opponents in Kenya, including their champion, Mahinder Singh. He also competed in tag team events with his brothers Aslam and Goga.

Akram started his wrestling career in his teens and quickly rose to prominence. He was initially a student of Gama and began competing in Lahore. During his early days, he faced Kala Pahalwan, known as "the Lion of Punjab", and lost the match. However, Kala Pahalwan did not offer a rematch and instead had his students compete against Akram. In 1954, Akram went to Bombay, where he had a series of matches without a loss. After returning to Pakistan, Akram challenged all local competitors. The champion of Multan, Zamman Khan, contested his claim, and Akram emerged victorious.

In 1958, Akram and his brothers toured Malaya, where he defeated their idol, Hari Ram, in a challenge bout. During a match in Chittagong against Big Bill Verna of Australia, Akram dislocated his left shoulder and was hospitalized. Despite this injury, the match ended in a draw. After his shoulder healed, Akram resumed wrestling and agreed to face the giant King Kong of Hungary.

In this bout, Akram defeated King Kong (Emile Czaja) in three rounds. The new threat to the Bholu Brothers in the person of Bhola Gadi, the champion of Lahore, who defeated the Bholu brothers, Azam alias Raja, in May 1962, in the historical Cities Championship Tournament. Akram then wrestled Bhola Gadi at Iqbal Park, Lahore, in a challenge match. After a furious struggle between the pair, Akram lifted Bhola Gadi high and slammed him on the mat for the initial three counts. The next opponent Akram faced was the highly reputed Haji Afzal, a very clever but lighter wrestler. Afzal was pinned in 15 minutes. In Nepal, Akram defeated the Kabul champion, Sardar Khan. Then, in a challenge fight, he trounced Pyara Singh of Indian Punjab. Some of his memorable victories were over Haji Afzal, King Kong, Aussie, Clyde Kennedy, Hardam Singh, Gurnam Singh, Hari Ram, Emile Koroshenko, Tony Kontellis, Con Papalazarou, Baron Von Heczey, Bloorma, Sam Betts, and George Gordianko. He drew matches against Shaikh Wadi Ayoub, Bert Assirati, and Big Bill Verna. Akram lost some of the fights but his overall performance was good. He suffered defeat at the hands of Kala Pahalwan "the Lion of Punjab" during the 1950s, Big Bill Verna and the 3-time world Judo champion Anton Geesink in South America in 1968. Akram remained active in professional wrestling until he lost an important match against Antonio Inoki in 1976.

=== Goga Pahalwan ===
Goga Pehalwan (real name Moazzam) (born in 1937) was also a Pakistani wrestler. The Amritsar-born, 1937, Pakistani champion was trained by the Great Gama of India for 15 years. He was lightly built and displayed a fighting style with quick reflexes. Some of his favourite manoeuvres were reverse flying kicks and leg breakers. Goga feuded with a number of famous wrestlers including Tiger Jogindar, Gunpat Andolkar, Eric Taylor, Earl Maynard, Killer Karl Kox, Zebra Kid, Wanik Buckley, Louis Kovacs, Kid Zemboa, Billy Robinson, Klondyke Bill, Dick Murdoch, Dusty Rhodes, Sam Betts, Haruka Eigen, Tarlok Singh, and Harbans Singh. His local opponents included Haji Afzal, Boonta Singh, Siddique Nukehwala, Sohni, and Garnam Singh. However, Goga lost a few matches to wrestlers such as Sam Betts. In professional Tag team wrestling, he teamed with Akram Pehalwan and Majid Ackra.

=== Hassu ===
Hassu (real name Hussain Bakhsh) was the second eldest son of Imam Bux, and an early teammate of the Bholu brothers. His real name was Hussain Bakhsh. He was a part of the Bholu Brothers team of wrestling, but his name was never heard publicly, since he gave up wrestling earlier. As a result, he is not well known among the wrestling fans like his brothers.

== See also ==
- List of Pehlwani wrestlers
- Wrestling Observer Newsletter
- Wrestlingnews
