= Imam Baksh Pahalwan =

Wrestler from British India (1883–1977)

- Born: 1883
- Died: 1977 (aged 93–94)
- Occupation: Wrestler
- Height: 6 ft 3 in (191 cm)
- Children: Bholu Pahalwan, Aslam Pahalwan, Akram Pahalwan, Goga Pahalwan, Azam Pahalwan
- Relatives: Gama Pehlwan

Imam Baksh Butt (1883–1977) was a wrestler from British India and a practitioner of the wrestling style of Pehlwani. Imam was also the brother of Ghulam "The Great Gama" Muhammad Lone. Imam had arrived in England by April, 1910, along with fellow wrestlers from British India, including his brother Ghulam Muhammad, Ahmed Bux, and Gamu, to participate in European catch wrestling tournaments.

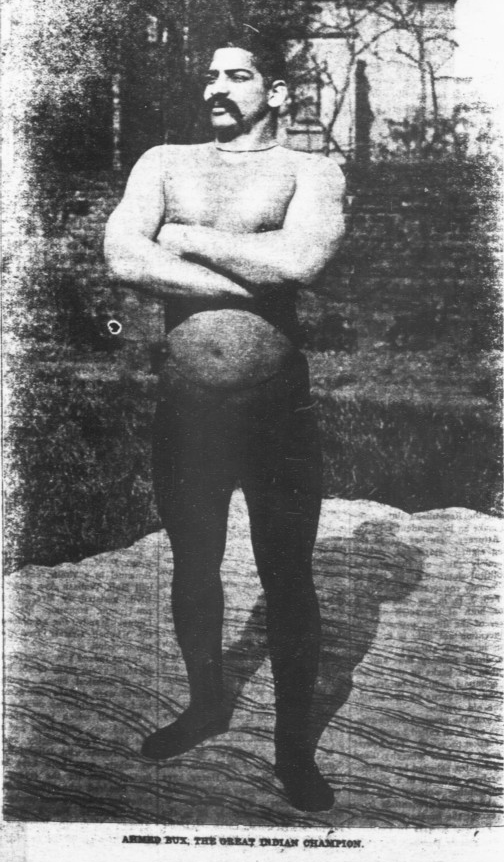
Ahmed Bux, Wrestler (1912)

Health and Strength magazine announced "The Invasion of the Indian Wrestlers" in its 14 May 1910, issue. The members of the Indian group were listed as Gama, Champion of India; Imam Baksh, Champion of Lahore; Ahmed Baksh, Champion of Amritsar; and Gamu, Champion of Jalandhar.

Imam Baksh wrestled Swiss champion John Lemm during his career. The match between Baksh and Lemm ended with Baksh defeating the Swiss champion.

In 1918, Gama Ghulam Muhammad, in a major tournament at Kolhapur, passed his title of Indian Champion to Imam Bux, who had thrown Rahim Sultaniwala in 20 minutes.

Some have argued that Imam Baksh, was an even finer wrestler than Gama himself. Imam Baksh frequently served as the first opponent for challengers seeking to face Gama, and it is said that no one managed to beat him in order to face Gama. In 1910, he accompanied Gama to London, where he twice pinned the Swiss wrestler John Lemm—one of Europe’s foremost grapplers—in a combined time of just four minutes. Henry Werner had written that letter saying that Imam Bux would have been a better opponent for Stanislaus Zbyszko than for Gama. The editor of Health and Strength wrote that, "in my opinion, he [Gama] is not quite so clever a wrestler as his brother, Imam Bux, who enjoys the advantage of a longer reach."

By the mid-1940s, Gama continued to put out challenges but added a stipulation. The stipulation was that anyone who wanted to wrestle the great Gama had to wrestle and defeat Imam first. No one did.
