= Bhola =

Bhola may refer to:

- Bhola District, Barisal Division, Bangladesh
  - Bhola Sadar Upazila, sub-division of the district
  - Bhola Island, largest island of Bangladesh covering the district
  - Bhola (town), on the island
  - 1970 Bhola cyclone
- Bholaa, 2023 Indian action film directed by and starring Ajay Devgn
- Bhola Shankar, 2023 Indian film directed by Meher Ramesh
- Bhola Prasad (disambiguation)
  - Bhola Prasad (footballer), Indian footballer
- Zahoor Mistry (1978–2022), alias Bhola, Pakistani Harkat-ul-Mujahideen militant, one of the hijackers of the 1999 Indian Airlines Flight 814

== See also ==
- Bhole (disambiguation)
- Bholu (disambiguation)
