= Zubair Jhara Pehalwan =

Pakistani wrestler (1960–1991)

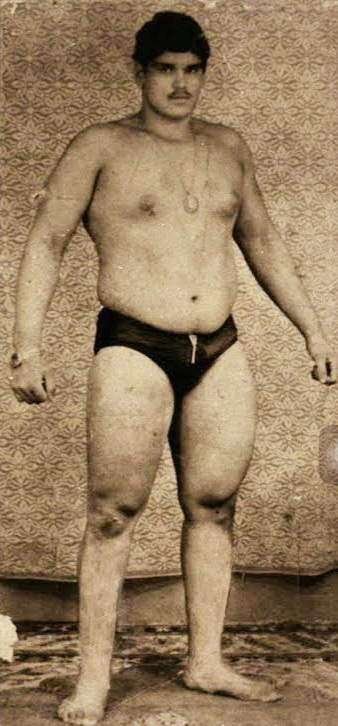

Personal information
- Born: Muhammad Zubair Aslam; 24 November 1960 Lahore, Pakistan
- Died: 10 September 1991 (aged 30) Lahore, Pakistan

Professional wrestling career
- Ring name(s): Pride of Pakistan; Rustam-e-Pakistan Rustam-e-Zaman
- Billed height: 6 ft 2 in (188 cm)
- Billed weight: 211 lb (96 kg)
- Trained by: Aslam Pahalwan; Arshad Bijli
- Debut: https://youtube.com/channel/UCl0I6JjJnI9vZM-BSZf00VA

Muhammad Zubair Aslam, (24 November 1960 – 10 September 1991), popularly known as Jhara Pahalwan (Punjabi: جھارا پہلوان), was a Pakistani wrestler who remained undefeated in his career.

In 1979, Jhara defeated Japanese wrestler Antonio Inoki in the fifth round who defeated his uncle Aki wrestler previously. Later, Jhara and Inoki became good friends.

== Career ==
Jhara, at the age of just 16, started wrestling internationally. His height was six-foot-two-inches and weighed in at approximately 96 kilogrammes. In the early days, Jhara fought his first professional wrestling matches with Zawar Multani Pehlwan in Multan and defeated him twice. He also holds the titles of Fakhar-e-Pakistan and Rustam-e-Pakistan. On June 17, 1979, Jhara fought with Antonio Inoki. However, before the bell even rang for the sixth round, the wrestler Inoki admitted defeat.

== Death ==
He died of heart failure on 10 September 1991. He was buried at Bholu Pahalwan Gymnasium, Lahore. In 2015, Antonio Inoki announced to take Jhara's nephew Haroon Abid under his guardianship in Japan.

== See also ==
- Bholu Brothers
- The Great Gama
- Aslam Pahalwan
