= Bholu =

Bholu may refer to:

- Bholu (mascot), Indian railways mascot
- Bholu Pahalwan, a Pakistani wrestler
- Bholu Brothers, a tag team in professional wrestling
- Bholu, a fictional character in the Indian animated series Chhota Bheem

== See also ==
- Bhola (disambiguation)
