= Mangla Rai =

Indian professional wrestler (1916 – 1976)

Bahadur Mangla Rai

Personal information
- Born: Mahamalla Bahadur Mangla Rai; October 1916 Joga Musahib, Ghazipur, Uttar Pradesh, India
- Died: 24 June 1976. (aged 59) Varanasi, India

Professional wrestling career
- Ring name: Mangla Rai ji
- Billed height: 6 ft 5 in (196 cm)
- Billed weight: 225–230 lb (102–104 kg) or 352 lb (160 kg)

Mahamalla Bahadur Mangla Rai (October 1916 – June 1976) also known as "Rustam-e-Hind and Hind Kesari Mangla Rai"was the ring-name of Mangla Rai.

== Early life ==
Legendary wrestler Rustam-e-Hind Mangla Rai was born in the month of October 1916 in a Bhumihar family of Joga Musahib Village in Ghazipur district of Uttar Pradesh. His father Bahadur Ramchandra Rai and his uncle Bahadur Radha Rai, were also well-known wrestlers. After attaining 16 years of age he joined police services as constable but his destiny was waiting for something very different and significant. He left his job and moved to Barma (Myanmar) where his father and uncle were residing and pursuing their professional careers. In Rangoon, Mangla started taking lessons in wrestling. In those days the great wrestler Shiv Murat Tiwari of Benaras was also practicing in an Akhara in Rangoon. He saw the physique of this young aspirant and began to train him. Shiv Murat Tiwari made Mangala a master of south-east Asian moves of wrestling. Rai was a good learner and mastered all the moves easily . It was Bhumihar genetics that made him so massive and strong. After a few years Mangla Rai came back to his motherland Ghazipur but he never forgot his first guru. He named his elder daughter 'Shiv Murat' paying gratitude to his guru.

== Career ==
=== Training and diet ===
Mangla Rai followed a tough regimen of exercises. After running 9 kilometers he used to do four thousand squats and two thousand five hundred pushups. Sometimes he used to do rope trainings. Mangla Rai was 6 feet 3 inches tall and weighed 160 Kilograms. He was initially Non-veg and use consume 5-6 liters if milk per day .

=== First encounter with Mustafa Pahelwan ===
Mangla Rai came into public attention just after his first bout in Rangoon with Fattey Singh and Isha Nat. He made both the champions to bite the dust in the ring with his famous move 'gadahlet'. In 1933 he came back to India and challenged Mustafa Pahalwan of Allahabad. Mustafa took him as a novice but got floored within 5 minutes when Mangla Rai used bahralli with full force. A star of wrestling was born in India after this famous bout.

=== Final encounter with Ghulam Gous ===
After defeating Fakhr-e-Hind & Rustam-e-Pakistan Ghulam Ghous he earned the title of Rustam-e-Hind. In the three decades of his career he won ninety five percent of bouts.

=== Fight with George Constentine ===
After beating Ghulam Gous in Benaras Bharat Narkesari Mangla Rai accepted the challenge of George Constantine. Romanian wrestler George was known as 'Tiger of Europe.' After defeating all his rivals in Europe he camped in Calcutta (Kolkata) challenging any one to dare him in the ring. Famous Puran Singh and Kesar Singh came forward to accept his challenge. But mahamalla Mangla Rai not only faced him but forced him to bite the dust.

=== Fight With Tiger Joginder Singh ===
Tiger Joginder Singh was an Indian professional wrestler who was the first All Asia Tag Team Champion along with King Kong. He was considered one of the top professional wrestlers of India at that time. He was never defeated by his opponents but mahabali Mangla Rai floored him within ten minutes in a wrestling competition held in Bombay (Mumbai).

=== Famous bout with Kesar Singh ===
It is believed that Kesar Singh was the only wrestler who was at equal strength with Mangla Rai and was never defeated by him. However records placed in personal diary of his mentor Pandaji of Varanasi speaks volumes about this renowned fight. It is stated in this record that 'Tiger of Punjab' Kesar Singh was floored by Hind Kesari Mangla Rai in Delhi but due to supporters pandemonium, the referee declared the match draw. In protest of this decision Mangla Rai refused to accept any award and prize money.

=== Death ===
In the year of 1963 Mangla Rai faced his last bout of wrestling with renowned wrestler Meharddin. Mangla Rai was 47 year old while Meharddin was only 27 years, however Mangla Rai used his famous Bahralli dav and Meharddin was thrown out of the ring. But due to low endurance of aging Rustam-e-Hind, the fight was announced drawn. After this fight Mangla Rai announced his retirement from the career of wrestling. He started living a peaceful farmer's life in his native village. He discontinued the tough regimen of exercises and unfortunately he got diabetes. His health started deteriorating. Due to multiple organ failure he died on 24 June 1976 in the city of Varanasi.

=== Legacy ===
Mangla Rai took care of all his disciples, including Dukh Haran Jha of Darbhanga, Sukhdev Pehlwan of Azamgarh, Mohan Chaube of Mathura, his younger brother Kamala Rai, Brahmachari Rai, Mathura Rai, and Baleshwar Pehlwan, all of them great wrestlers of their time. However Mangla Rai didn't allow any of them to use a single penny of their prize money, covering all of their expenses himself. Mangla Rai was a true Guru in old Indian tradition.

== Championships and accomplishments ==
- "Rustam-e-Hind": After defeating Ghulam Ghous
- Hind kesari title was given to him in 1954 to formally recognize him as the absolute supreme heavyweight champion of Indian traditional wrestling (Pehlwani).

Statue outside the village near "Shiv" temple

=== Genetics and Ancestry ===
Mangla rai belonged from Bhumihar community. Bhumihars are prominent community primarily found in Bihar , Uttar Pradesh—are best understood through a combination of evolutionary genetics, historical lifestyle, and dietary habits (specifically protein consumption). Genetic studies on Indo-Aryan communities of the Indo-Gangetic plains, including Bhumihars, show a high percentage of Ancestral North Indian (ANI) ancestry. This genetic component is closely related to ancient Central Asian , Middle Eastern , and Western Eurasian populations. The evolutionary lineage of these northern groups often expresses distinct phenotypical traits, such as a larger skeletal frame, dense bone structure, and higher average height compared to populations from other ecological zones. These physical attributes provide a natural foundation for physical strength to Mangla rai.

"यवन म्लेच्छ हूण के हंता। बाभन वीर धीर बलवंता॥"

== See also ==
- Akhara
- List of Pehlwani wrestlers
- Wrestling in India
- Pehlwani
- Bhumihar
