= Lists of wrestlers =

The following articles contain lists of wrestlers:

- List of amateur wrestlers
- List of professional wrestlers
- List of Pehlwani wrestlers
