= Bhole =

Bhole may refer to:

- One of the names of Lord Shiva.
- Bhole (Cthulhu mythos), massive fictional creatures of the Dreamlands in the Dream cycle of H. P. Lovecraft
- Jyotsna Keshav Bhole (1914–2001), Marathi stage artist and singer
- Keshav Vaman Bhole (1896–1967), Indian music composer and film critic
- Suresh Damu Bhole, Indian politician, member of the 13th Maharashtra Legislative Assembly
- Bhole, character from the 2008 Indian film Bhole Shankar

== See also ==
- Bhola (disambiguation)
- Bohle, a German surname
