= Emile Czaja =

Australian-Indian wrestler and actor (1909–1970)

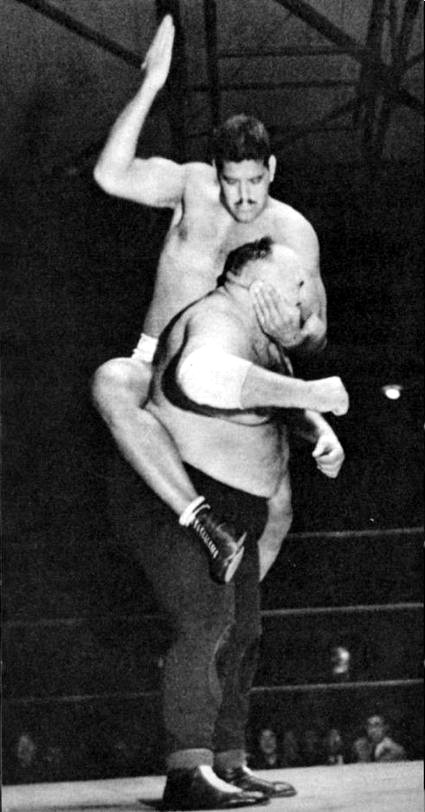
- Czaja (bottom) wrestling Dara Singh in 1955

Personal information
- Born: 15 July 1909 Hungary
- Died: 16 May 1970 (aged 60) Singapore
- Cause of death: Car accident

Professional wrestling career
- Ring name(s): Emile Czaja; King Kong; King Kong Czaja; King Kong Czaya
- Billed height: 6 ft 0 in (183 cm)
- Billed weight: 400 lb (181 kg)
- Billed from: Australia
- Debut: 1937
- Retired: 1962

Emile Czaja (15 July 1909 – 16 May 1970), better known by his ring name King Kong, was an Australian-Indian professional wrestler and actor born in Hungary in 1909. He was active from 1929 until 1970. He wrestled mostly in Japan, Singapore, Europe, New Zealand, and Australia. In professional wrestling, his arch rivals were Aslam Pahalwan, Hamida Pahalwan, Sheik Ali and Dara Singh.

== Early life ==
The Hungarian born Emile Czaja started wrestling in Europe. At the age of 18, he was participating in important matches all over Europe. He excelled in all styles of wrestling and soon become a formidable opponent for all the top contenders.

== Professional wrestling career ==
Czaja started his professional career in India in 1937. He was given the name "King Kong" after playing the part of King Kong in an Indian movie. In 1945, he wrestled Hamida Pehelwan in front of approximately 200,000 spectators in Lahore, India. He frequently wrestled for over 100,000 fans.

In 1937, he arrived in Bombay India, where many western wrestlers had gathered to trade grips with the East Indian greats. Some of the celebrities were Jeji Goldstein of Palestine, Edmond Von Kramer of Germany, Tony Lamaro of Italy, Emil Koroshenko of Hungary, George Zbisco of Poland, George Constantine of Romania, Arty Counsel of Australia, and later joined by five times world champion, Ed "Strangler" Lewis and Ted Thye. These assailants often dare Great Gama, but to their dismay, Gama had retired and the fleet of Imam Bux, Hamida, Goonga, Yankapa Boolar, Young Gama among others were the stalwarts willing to face the challengers. Kong wrestled quite a few of them and after drawing with Goonga, earned a shot at Hamida Pahalwan. These were the two defeats that Kong had suffered before the war and this by no means belittled his ratings as one of the world's top ranking wrestlers.

Then in 1947, after the war, another country was created- Pakistan. Wrestling immediately took a strong hold there. In 1952, Emile Czaja came back to Bombay from Singapore and approached a well-known businessman Mr. Goostad D. Irani, "The Mat Mogul of India", and a tournament was arranged in Bombay. It was a tremendous success for all. Wrestling had its next lease of life by the hard work of Emile Czaja-Goostad D. Irani friendship. Up until the late 1960s the wrestling flourished in all parts of India under Irani's promotion.

On 16 November 1955 in the Japan Wrestling Association, King Kong and Tiger Joginder Singh defeated JWA founder Rikidōzan and Harold Sakata in a two out of three falls tournament final to crown the inaugural All Asia Tag Team Champions. They later vacated the title after the tag team split up. On 22 November of that year, however, Rikidōzan defeated King Kong to become the inaugural All Asia Heavyweight Champion. His matches against Hamida, Goonga, Aslam Pahalwan, Seelie Samara, Tor Johnson and Tiger Joginder Singh are still talked about.

After marrying in 1956, he continued his pro-wrestling career using Sydney as his headquarters. He broke gate records in Australia and wrestled Rikidozan of Japan for 3 1/2 hours before losing the bout by a lone fall. He met and beat some of the best in the world. Some of the well-known names that were beaten by this man mountain are Tiger Holden, Harban Singh, Syed Saif Shah, George Pencheff, Big Bill Verna, George Zbisco and many others. He wrestled Lou Thesz for the world title in Singapore in 1958. He wrestled in the East, Europe and United Kingdom throughout the mid-1960s and fans saw the Mighty King Kong in action again.

=== Bouts with Dara Singh ===
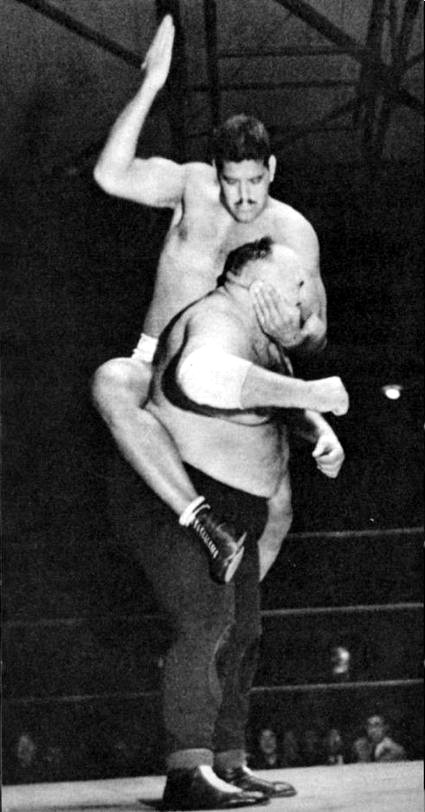
Dara Singh mounted punches to King Kong at the Japan Wrestling Association 1955

Of all his fights, the ones that caught imagination of the public in South Asia were his bouts with Dara Singh. Dara Singh's act of flooring King Kong remains embedded in Indian legend.

== Death ==
While traveling back to Singapore after a match in Penang, Malaysia, Czaja was badly injured in a car crash in Ipoh on 12 May 1970. He died in Singapore on 16 May 1970, aged 60.

== Filmography ==
Year	Film	Role	Notes
1953	Ponni	Himself	Tamil film
1962	King Kong	King Kong	Hindi films
1962	Hong Kong		Hindi films
1963	Patal Nagri		Hindi films
1963	King of Carnival		Hindi films
1963	Faulad	Slave master	Hindi films
1964	Khufia Mahal	Wrestler	Hindi films
1964	Samson		Hindi films
1964	Hercules	Wrestler	Hindi films
1964	Aaya Toofan	Wrestler	Hindi films
1965	Tarzan and King Kong	Tarzan's opponent	Hindi films
1965	Sangram		Hindi films
1965	Hum Sab Ustad Hain	King Kong Wrestler	Hindi films
1968	Mujrim Kaun?		Hindi films
1972	Mele Mitran De		Punjabi film

== Championships and accomplishments ==
- Japan Wrestling Association
  - All Asia Tag Team Championship (1 time)- with Tiger Joginder Singh
- Other promotions
  - Oriental Heavyweight Championship
  - Australian Junior Heavyweight Championship
