= Gulam =

Indian wrestler (c. 1860 – c. 1900/1901)

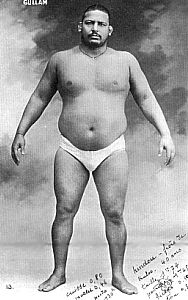
- Ghulam in c.1900
- Born: Ghulam Mohammad c. 1860; Amritsar, Punjab
- Died: c. 1900 – c. 1901; Calcutta
- Occupation: Wrestler
- Sports career
- Height: 5 ft 10 in (178 cm)
- Weight: 280 to 290 lb (130 to 130 kg)
- Sport: Wrestling
- Event: Paris Exposition of 1900

Gulam (also spelled Ghulam; c. 1860 – c. 1900/1901), born Ghulam Mohammad, was an Indian wrestler and strongman from Amritsar, Punjab. Known for his large physique and undefeated record, he is considered one of the greatest wrestlers of his era. According to contemporary accounts, Gulam, who was nicknamed 'Rustam-e-Hind' (the Champion of India), never experienced his back touching the mat nor his opponents being able to move his legs.

He gained international recognition at the Paris Exposition of 1900, where he defeated the Turkish wrestler Cour-Derelli. He is identified in historical accounts as the first notable Indian wrestler to appear in the West.

== Early life ==
Gulam was born around 1860 into a family of wrestlers. His father was the noted wrestler Ali Baksh, also known as Alia Pahelwan. He belonged to the Kotwala wrestling school. Following the death of his father, Gulam received his training from his maternal uncle, Suleman Pahelwan, who served as a court wrestler for the Jodhpur State.

== Career ==
=== India ===
Gulam began his professional career in 1878 in Jodhpur, winning his debut match against Mullah Handa (Mohammad Ali Pahelwan). He subsequently secured victories against prominent wrestlers of the time, including Feroz Pahelwan and Chirag Ali, in 1880.

After accumulating wealth and fame in Jodhpur, Gulam returned to Amritsar to establish his own akhara (training center). He engaged in a notable rivalry with Kikkar Singh, a wrestler known for his massive size. Kikkar Sing was said that he had once uprooted an acacia tree with his bare hand's.

Their first encounter took place in Amritsar in 1886, where Gulam emerged victorious. Gulam defeated Kikkar Singh in a grueling two-hour bout.

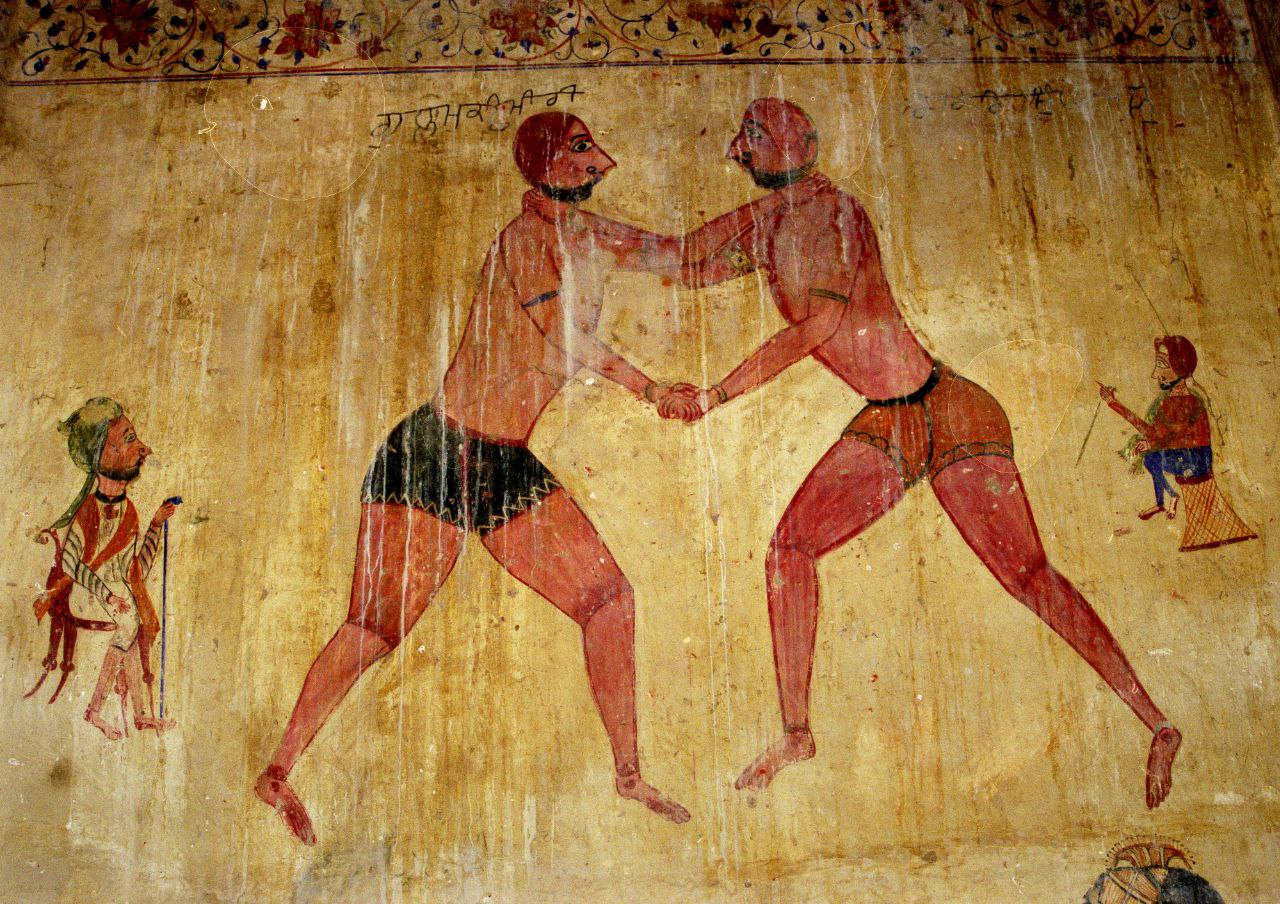
Fresco depicting Kikkar Singh (right) pitted against his great rival, Ghulam Pahelwan (left), decorating the gateway of Jand village in Ludhiana district, Punjab

They met again a month later in Jammu, where Kikkar Singh was the champion of the Maharaja of Kashmir. Gulam wagered 100,000 rupees on the match and defeated Singh for the second time. The two rivals faced each other three more times. Two matches held at Shahdera Serai near Lahore ended in draws; in the first of these (1895), Gulam suffered severe finger injuries which prevented him from continuing. However, in a subsequent match held before the Maharaja of Jodhpur, Gulam won decisively.

In 1898, the Maharaja Rajendra Singh of Patiala invited Gulam to wrestle Shah Nawaz Nanniwala. Gulam won the bout, further cementing his reputation.

=== Paris Exposition (1900) ===
In 1900, Gulam travelled to France to compete at the Paris Exposition. Gulam attended the event accompanied by his brother Kullu and four other wrestlers from Lahore and Amritsar, One report said Gulam was taken by Motilal Nehru, (father of Jawaharlal Nehru and grandfather of Indira Gandhi) to Paris around 1899–1900 for exhibition matches during the Paris Exposition. It was said that the dominance of this "Indian Wrestlers invasion" prompt some comments by the media at that time

What is New South Wales coming to, at least the male population of that colony? There were some sports held up country, one of the items in the programme being a wrestling match and, sad to say, this was won by a Hindoo hawker.... New South Wales is now dishonored, disgraced, dis-gusted, and, distinguished, for one of her "brawny" sons was defeated by a Hindoo hawker! Let us pray

— Anonymous (Australian newspaper), Quoted in Sen, Ronojoy. Nation at Play: A History of Sport in India. Columbia University Press, 2015, p. 168.

There, Gulam also faced a Turkish heavyweight known as Cour-Derelli (also identified as Qadir Ali), who stood 6 ft 5 in (1.96 m) tall and weighed approximately 320 pounds.

According to French wrestling historian Edmond Desbonnet, Gulam displayed "crushing superiority" despite wrestling with a sprained left arm. Gulam threw his opponent with a "flying mare" maneuver, but the throw was not officially recognized due to disputes involving betting interests. Following this, the Turkish wrestler adopted a defensive strategy, lying flat on the mat for an hour and a half to avoid being thrown again. Gulam eventually kicked his opponent in frustration. To protect the financial interests of the bettors, the match was declared a win for Gulam, but all bets were cancelled.

Dr. Krajewski, a mentor to the famous wrestler George Hackenschmidt, examined Gulam in Paris. Impressed by his physique and skill, Krajewski remarked that no wrestler in the world could last five minutes against Gulam in a fair contest. Some accounts, such as that by S. Muzumdar, suggest that Motilal Nehru may have accompanied Gulam to Europe, though Muzumdar's recollection of the match details contradicts contemporary French accounts.

== Death and legacy ==
Shortly after his return to India from Paris, Gulam contracted cholera and died in Calcutta, either in 1900 or 1901.

Gulam is remembered as one of the few wrestlers to retire undefeated. Desbonnet classified him as one of the two "super wrestlers" of the modern era, alongside Youssouf Ishmaelo. Stanislaus Zbyszko, a world champion wrestler, described Gulam as "the ruler of his day, of the mat, of human strength," based on accounts from those who had trained with him.
