= Bhola Prasad =

Bhola Prasad may refer to:

- Bhola Prasad (footballer)
- Bhola Prasad (politician)
- Bhola Prasad Singh College
