= Sheik Ali =

Sheik Wadi Ayoub

Personal information
- Born: Wadi Ayoub; 20 April 1927 Sebhel, Zgharta District, Lebanon
- Died: 29 September 1976 (aged 49)

Professional wrestling career
- Ring name(s): Shiek Ali; Sheik Wadi Ayoub; Wadi Ayoub
- Billed from: Beirut, Lebanon
- Trained by: Tom Lurich; Chief Little Wolf; Jim Deakin
- Debut: March 1953

Wadi Ayoub (20 April 1927 - 29 September 1976) was a champion Greco–Roman style wrestler in Lebanon and then a professional wrestler, best known as Sheik Ali, in Australia and touring internationally. He was famous for his headbutts and his moves included the "Egyptian Deadlock".

== Career ==
By the age of 22, Ayoub had progressed to being the Champion of Lebanon. In 1951, he left Lebanon behind, and came to Australia in search of a better way of life. Realising that, to be successful in professional wrestling, he needed added weight, he underwent a course of bodybuilding at Dovey's Gymnasium, Sydney. He was successful in adding over 40 lb body weight. Additionally, he seized every opportunity to work with freestyle wrestlers and to make himself fit enough for a career in professional wrestling. Among the early wrestlers who helped him achieve his target of becoming a professional were Tom Lurich, Chief Little Wolf and Jim Deakin.

In March 1953, he made his debut at Leichhardt Stadium, in an encounter against Jon Morro. After four more contests, Ayoub headed for New Zealand and held his own against the British Empire Champion, Earl McCready. He was signed for a series of contests against wrestlers that were operating throughout India at the time. Some of these included Tiger Joginder Singh, Emil Koroshenko, Dara Singh, Emile Czaja, Bert Assirati and Harbans Singh.

In 1956, he returned to Sydney where wrestling was in full swing. At White City, he wrestled Tiger Ray Holden. The rest of the year was spent in Hobart, Adelaide and Perth, where he competed against such talent as George Pencheff, King Kong and Baron von Heczey. In 1957 at White City, he went to a draw with the Indian, Tarlok Singh. In October en route to Japan for a World Title clash against the Champion, Lou Thesz, he stopped in Singapore for a bout against King Kong for the Malaysian Heavyweight crown. In a fierce contest, Kong was victorious. When negotiations for his visit to Japan fell through, Ayoub decided to stay in Singapore and competed in bouts with Ricky Waldo and Aslam Pehalwan. In March 1958, Ayoub returned to Sydney. At the Sports Ground, he wrestled Andreas Lambrakis to a draw. He then went to Adelaide and Hobart, where he competed against the likes of George Duane and King Kong.

Although he was in demand from overseas promoters, he was ignored by the promoters of Stadiums Limited. This had little effect on his career, as he was soon off on a five-year tour of the Far East and Europe. His first stop was Singapore where he clashed with Emile Czaja, as well as Charles Henry and Akram Pahelwan. From here, Ayoub went to India. In New Delhi he defeated Arjit Singh. His contract was extended a further year to fit in contests against George Pencheff, Bill Verna, Don Steadman, George Zbisko, Dara Singh, George Gordienko and numerous others.

=== 1960s ===
1961 saw Ayoub in Europe under the promotion of the European Wrestling Alliance (France) and Joint Promotions (England). He went to Belgium and then Paris, where he wrestled L’Homme Masque, who resorted to foul tactics by hitting him with a microphone. Ayoub retaliated and attacked Masque with such ferocity it took 25 police officers to drag him clear. Ayoub then went on to Belgium where he competed in a tournament against Horst Hoffman, Herman Iffland, Roger Delaporte and Jack Lasartesse, amongst others. He then went to England where he met Billy Robinson, Jack Pye, Tibor Szakacs, Billy Joyce, Mike Marino, George Portz and many others.

In 1963 he returned to India and competed against Sucha Singh, Al Rodgoa and Dara Singh. He returned to Australia and made his headquarters in Sydney. He wrestled Lucky Simunovich, Con Paplazarou, Alex Iakovides and Elias Panagos at Sydney, Melbourne and Adelaide Stadiums.

=== 1970s ===
In 1971, Wadi Ayoub engaged in several contests against the reigning New Zealand and British Empire Champion, John DaSilva and came out on top. In other matches, he accounted for Dr Death and El Montana.

Although circumstances prevented Ayoub performing with the World Championship Wrestling Promotion, (the American promoters were loath to use Australian wrestlers to headline their programmes), the use of Wadi Ayoub in main event matches was a breakthrough for Australian–based wrestlers. In 1972, with World Championship Wrestling, Ayoub turned back the likes of Killer Karl Kox, Tiger Joginder Singh, Brute Bernard and Bulldog Brower. He returned for another series of matches and again remained undefeated, this time against Bob Roop, Don Fargo, Waldo von Erich, Guy Mitchell, Don Carson and Hiro Tojo. He was also involved in tag matches with Mark Lewin, Spiros Arion and King Curtis against the likes of Abdullah the Butcher, Big Bad John and The Tojo Brothers (Hiro 'The Great' Tojo and Hito Tojo).

== Championships and accomplishments ==
- Middle East Heavyweight Championship (1 time)

== See also ==
- List of premature professional wrestling deaths
