= Kikkar Singh =

Wrestler from Lahore, British India

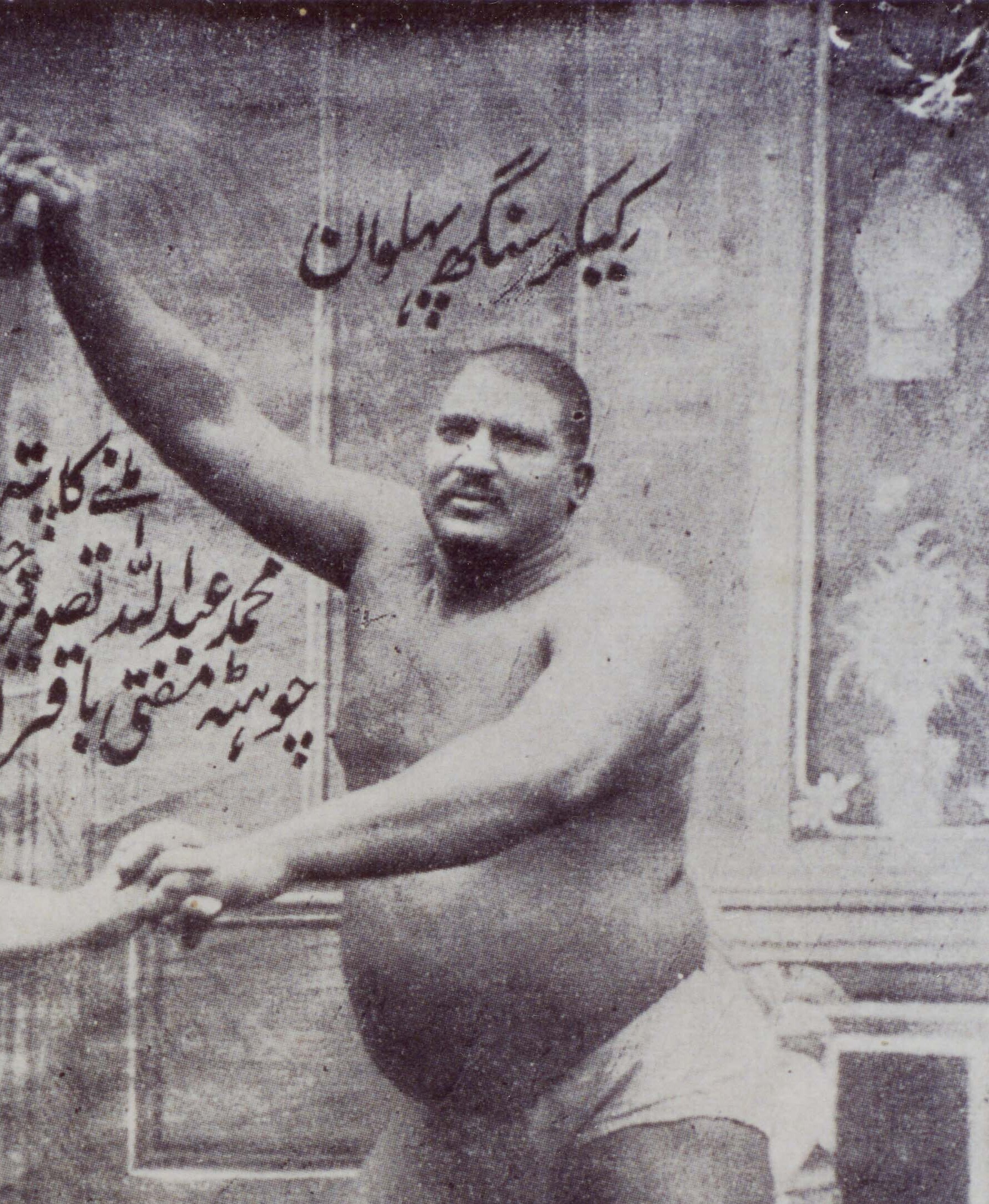

Personal information
- Born: Prem Singh; 13 January 1857 Ghanienke, Lahore, British India
- Died: 18 February 1914 (aged 57) Ghanienke, Lahore, British India
- Family: Javala Singh Sandhu (father) Sahib Kaur (mother)

Professional wrestling career
- Ring name: Kikkar Singh
- Billed height: 6 ft 6 in (198 cm)
- Billed weight: 266–364 lb (121–165 kg)
- Billed from: Lahore
- Retired: 1911

Pehelvan Kikkar Singh Sandhu (January 13, 1857 – 18 February 1914) was a Sikh wrestler from Lahore, British India (now Pakistan).

== Life ==
Kikkar Singh was born as 'Prem Singh' into a Sandhu Jat family to wrestler Javala Singh Sandhu and Sahib Kaur. His parents were farmers of moderate means in the village of Ghanienke, Lahore district (now in Pakistan). Kikkar grew to be a tall man. Singh trained as a wrestler in his mother's native village, Nurpur, under the village potter, before returning to Ghanienke to continue training with wrestler Vasava Sing.

Singh was already a popular wrestler when he started his tutelage under Buta Pahilvan, Rustam-i-Hind, of Lahore. Singh developed world class skill, and eventually became the leading Indian wrestler. He enjoyed the patronage of the rulers of the princely states of Jodhpur, Indore, Dasuya, Tonk and Jammu and Kashmir.

There are several theories on why he came to be known as Kikkar Singh. One theory is that he once uprooted a kikkar tree (acacia) with his bare hands. Another states that he earned his botanical name due to his extraordinary height and dark complexion, which were uncommon for the time.

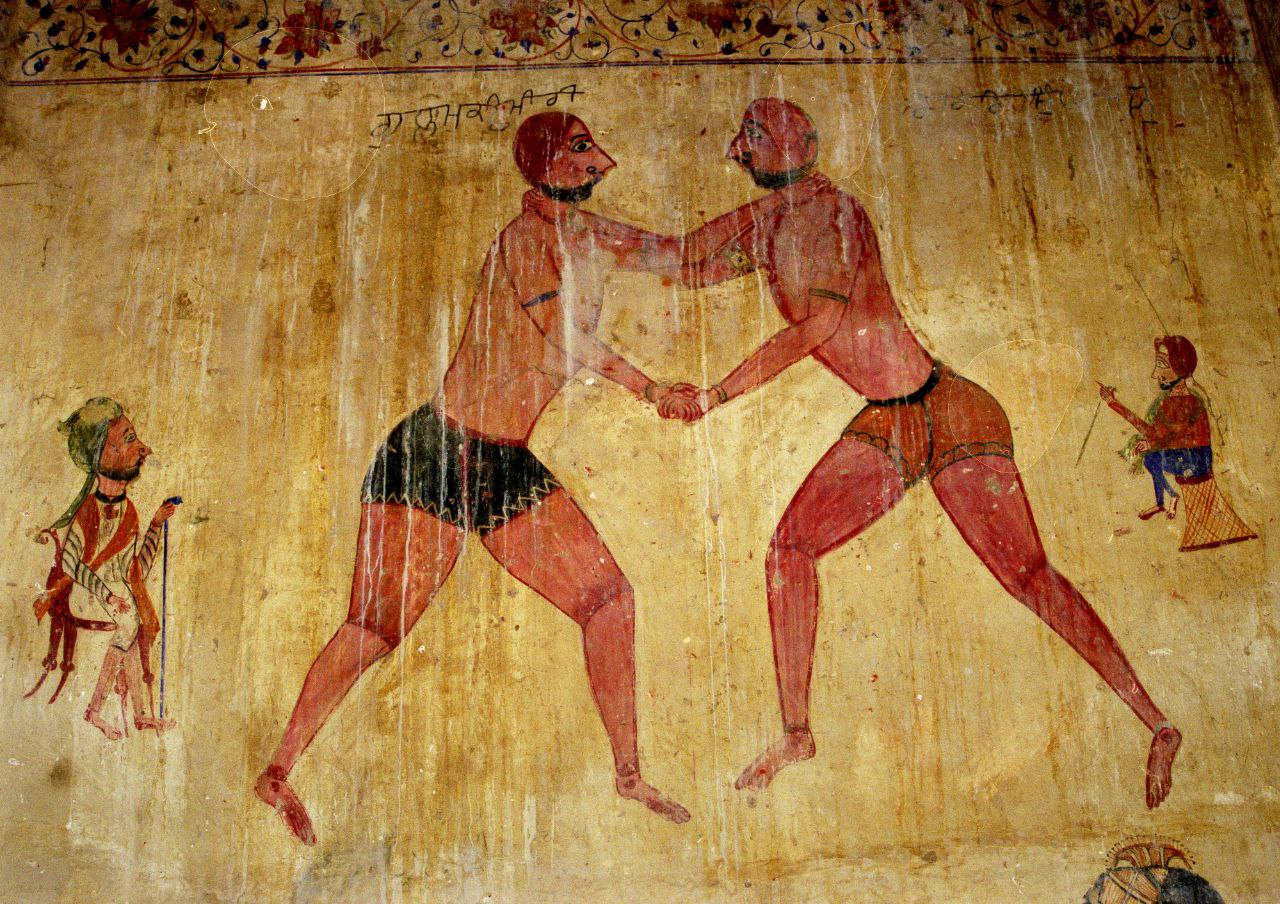
Fresco depicting Kikkar Singh (right) pitted against his great rival, Ghulam Pahelwan (left), decorating the gateway of Jand village in Ludhiana district, Punjab

Kikkar Singh fought and won many bouts during his lifetime. In fact, there were not many competitors to match his strength and skill. However, he lost the last bout of his life. During the Delhi Durbar, held in December 1911 to celebrate the coronation of King George V, Singh was challenged by a younger wrestler and an old rival, Kallu of Amritsar. Singh, at 54, was long past his prime and already asthmatic, but he would not let the challenge go unanswered. He put up a considerable fight to the delight of the elite gathering (Maharaja Bhupinder Singh of Patiala and Sardul Singh Caveeshar were among the spectators), but lost. To many eyewitnesses it appeared to be a dubious judgement.

Kikkar Singh died on 18 February 1914 in his native village, where a samadhi or memorial shrine has been raised in his memory.

== Bibliography ==
- Joban Sandhu, The Encyclopedia of Sikhism
