= Nasir Bholu =

Pakistani professional wrestler

- Born: 1960 (age 65–66)
- Occupation: Professional wrestler

Nasir Bholu (born 1960) is a retired Pakistani professional wrestler and the last surviving member of the "Bholu Brothers" wrestling team. He belongs to the Gama wrestling family. Nasir Bholu was a wrestler during the 1980s. He debuted in wrestling by defeating Yasir Ali of U.A.E. in November 1979. His complete professional record in not available yet, but he mostly wrestled in Pakistan and the Middle East during his short career as a wrestler. In 1982, he won the Asian championship by beating David Stalford in Bangladesh.

Due to his wrestling abilities, Antonio Inoki offered to train him in Japan but this idea was opposed by his elders and hence rejected. In 1990, Nasir completely left professional wrestling, bringing an end to the era of Bholu brothers. Nasir Bholu currently resides in Lahore. He is not directly involved in wrestling, but runs gyms and does business with China.

In 1981, Goga Pehlwan was accidentally killed by Nasir Bholu's flying drop kick during a friendly fight.

In 1991, Nasir Bholu did his sole acting role in the Punjabi movie Chitan.
