= Hamida Pahalwan =

Pakistani wrestler (1907–1984)

Personal information
- Born: Abdul Hameed; April 7, 1907 British Raj
- Died: April 12, 1984 (aged 77) Lahore, Pakistan

Professional wrestling career
- Ring name(s): The King Of Ring; Rustam-e-Hind
- Billed height: 6 ft 1 in (1.85 m)
- Billed weight: 290 lb (132 kg)

Hamida Pahalwan (7 April 1907 – 12 April 1984) was a Pakistani wrestler. He was the former Rustam-i-Hind and one of the elite champions of the British Raj.

== Early life ==
Hamida Pahalwan was born during the British Raj in 1907. He started his training at the age of six in Radhanpur and earned title of Rustam-i-Hind during 1930s. He worked as an official wrestler for the Nawab Jalaluddin of Radhanpur and also trained Aslam Pahalwan. Following partition, he went to Lahore, Pakistan and remained there until his death in 1984.

== Death ==
He died on April 12, 1984, in Lahore, Pakistan. Hamida Pahalwan was the maternal uncle of the Bholu Brothers of Pakistan. He was the trainer of Bholu Pahalwan and Aslam Pahalwan.
