= Aslam Pahalwan =

Pakistani professional wrestler (1927-1989)

Personal information
- Born: Muhammad Aslam; January 14, 1927 Punjab, British India
- Died: January 7, 1989 (aged 61) Lahore, Punjab, Pakistan

Professional wrestling career
- Ring name(s): The Wrestling King; Rustam-e-Jahan
- Billed height: 6 ft 4 in (1.93 m)
- Billed weight: 300 lb (136 kg)
- Trained by: Hamida Pahalwan

Muhammad Aslam (Urdu: اسلم پہلوان; 14 January 1927 – 7 January 1989), popularly known as Aslam Pahalwan, was a Pakistani professional wrestler and World Heavyweight Champion in professional wrestling. He was ranked as the world's No.9 by Wrestling Revue "Official Wrestling Ratings in December 1968. In Europe and America, he had wrestled as the All-India Champion. His son Jhara Pahalwan was also a wrestler.

== Professional wrestling career ==
Aslam Pahalwan started his wrestling career as the pupil of Hamida Pahalwan and the Great Gama. He started wrestling during the 1940s. He used to train three times a day doing mostly Pahalwani exercises like the Indian style pushups called dands and squats known as baithaks in the local language as well as some other exercises to increase his strength, stamina and flexibility. To maintain his body weight after a strenuous workout, he used to eat nutritious and high-calorie diet. It is said that he used to eat an entire goat during a single meal.

He started his career by participating in tournaments held mostly in the Punjab region, but he also competed in games held in other parts of India. His first wrestling match was in Amritsar against Bala Pahalwan of India, whom he defeated in ninety seconds. He also defeated Niranjan Singh in Patiala in less than two minutes. During the pre-independence days, the Maharaja of Patiala used to sponsor a wrestling championship in his princely state each year, during the Islamic month of Moharram. During one such tournament, Aslam defeated Puran Singh in a final showdown.

After the independence of Pakistan in 1947, Aslam settled in Lahore, Pakistan, where he defeated Kala Pahalwan and Aslam Mohni Wala. In 1951, Aslam defeated Younus Pahalwan (also known as Younus Gujranwala of Gujranwala) for the title of Rustam-e-Punjab. He was officially declared Rustam-i-Punjab (Champion of Punjab) in Minto Park, Lahore.

Aslam was a bridge between traditional kushti and pro wrestling, inspiring future generations in Pakistan. After becoming the champion of Punjab, he wrestled and defeated the 1939 International Wrestling Australia (IWA) Heavyweight Champion, George Pencheff, who was operating throughout India during the early 1950s. In 1953, he won the Commonwealth Championship. Aslam then issued challenges to wrestlers all over the world and announced a reward of 100,000 rupees to any wrestler who could beat him. In a challenge match, Aslam defeated Indian wrestler Tarlok Singh at the National Stadium in Karachi in the second round. In Nairobi, Kenya in 1953, he defeated Mahinder Singh. Aslam is best remembered for defeating the European Heavyweight Champion and former World Champion, Bert Assirati in Bombay, India on 3 June 1954. In 1957, he traveled to the Far East. Aslam defeated a wrestler calling himself King Kong and Sheik Wadi Ayuob. Aslam later defeated Tiger Sucha Singh and Joginder Singh at the National Stadium in Karachi in a challenge match. In May 1962, he defeated King Kong Czaja and Lofty Binnie of New Zealand in Karachi.

During the early 1960s, he wrestled in India and Pakistan. In 1967, Aslam was sponsored by British promoter Christopher Whelan. He toured the United Kingdom and faced opponents at the leading arenas of the North, Midlands and Scotland. He defeated the Canadian Champion George Gordienko. On his return home, he was awarded the Pride of Performance Award by the Government of Pakistan in 1967. In 1971, he wrestled in the United Kingdom, but this visit was cut short due to Indo-Pakistani war of 1971. He was managed by the British wrestling promoter Orig Williams. no modern Pakistani wrestler has reached Aslam’s level of fame. His closest comparison Today in modern professional wrestling is possibly Brock Lesnar (legit fighter + pro wrestler), but modern-day Pakistan lacks a similar star. Comparison to Global Stars of the 1960s. Not at the level of NWA/WWWF/AWA world champions (Thesz, Sammartino, Gagne) – those were full-time global stars. Aslam is Comparable to mid-card international talents like Skull Murphy, Mike Marino, or Hans Schmidt – respected but not world-title level.His feud with Dara Singh (India’s biggest wrestling star) was legendary, Aslam wrestled in England for Joint Promotions (British wrestling’s top organization) in the 1960s, facing stars like Billy Robinson, Mick McManus, and Bert Royal. First Major Encounter with Indian champions was in (Late 1950s – Early 1960s). The Hind Kesari (Indian Champion) belt was the most prestigious title in subcontinental wrestling. Aslam was one of toughest challengers. Often in Delhi, Mumbai, or Lahore (major hubs for wrestling). He also had tours in Japan (JWA), wrestling against icons like former NWA world heavyweight Champion Giant Baba and former WWA Champion Toyonobori, though he was more of a "special attraction" than a main-eventer. The Aslam Bholu vs. Indian champions feuds was one of the biggest wrestling rivalries in South Asian history, drawing massive crowds in India and Pakistan during the 1950s-1960s. Their matches were hybrid contests, blending traditional Pehlwani (kushti) grappling with Western-style pro wrestling theatrics.

Aslam was more famous in South Asia than in the U.S./Europe, similar to how King Kong (Man Mountain) Kirk was a regional star in Australia.

== Death ==
Aslam Pahalwan retired from wrestling during the early 1970s. He died on 7 January 1989 at the age of 61 in Pakistan. His son Jhara Pahalwan was also a champion wrestler.

== Awards ==
- Pride of Performance Award by the President of Pakistan in 1967.
