= Hamida Banu (wrestler) =

India's first woman wrestler (died 1986)

Personal information
- Born: Aligarh, Uttar Pradesh
- Died: 1986

Professional wrestling career
- Billed height: 1.6 m (5 ft 3 in)
- Billed weight: 108 kg (238 lb)
- Trained by: Salam Pahalwan
- Debut: 1937
- Retired: 1950

Hamida Banu (died 1986) was India’s first female wrestler. She was known for dominating the wrestling circuits for over a decade from the time of her debut in 1937. She was also known as the "Amazon of Aligarh." She challenged and won against many male Indian wrestlers of the time and also participated in wrestling competitions in Europe.

== Early life and background ==
Born in Aligarh, Uttar Pradesh in the early 1920s, Banu was initiated into martial arts at the age of 10 by her father, a famous wrestler named Nader Pahelwan. Little else is known about Banu’s early life.

== Wrestling career and notable matches ==
Banu began her career as a wrestler at a time. When most sports in India, and wrestling in particular, were male-dominated spaces. She began her training in Aligarh under a local wrestler named Salam Pahalwan. Since entry of women into these spaces was largely restricted, Banu resorted to wrestling male opponents, which was received with great criticism. At these matches, Hamida wore the same sports outfit, which incited protests from conservative men. Her opponents often refused to wrestle her because they felt that women were not worthy of a fight. Simultaneously, male wrestlers like Baba Pahelwan challenged her to either marry him or defeat him in a wrestling match - in an attempt to dismiss and undermine her skills as a female athlete.

Although Banu succeeded in her fight against several male wrestlers, the orthodox community in Punjab refused to accept her passion for wrestling and even targeted her with insults and physical assaults. Soon after, she had no choice but to flee.

There were two other known cases in which the widespread perception of wrestling as a man’s sport stood in the way of Banu’s career. According to The Times of India, a bout with male wrestler Ramchandra Salunke had to be canceled because the local wrestling federation objected. There was another time when Hamida was booed and stoned by people when she defeated a male opponent, which called for police authorities to intervene.

Banu is known to have won over 320 wrestling matches in her career which spans 1930-1950. The first wrestling match that proved to be a turning point was her 1937 face-off with Lahore wrestler Feroze Khan in Agra, where she "pinned him down" and "threw him back down with an energetic flying mare," taking him by complete surprise.

Following the now-famous ultimatum of "Beat me in a bout and I'll marry you," In a bout held in Mumbai on May 2, 1954, Banu, then five foot three and weighing a substantial 230 pounds, defeated a prospective suitor and wrestler Baba Pahelwan in less than two minutes. An interesting anecdote about this match tells us how Chhote Gama Pahalwan, a wrestler who was patronised by the Maharajah of Baroda, was to be Hamida’s opponent but had supposedly withdrawn upon hearing of Banu’s unbelievable strength, but not before citing his refusal to fight a woman as his reason for dropping out, thus leaving the next challenger Baba Pahelwan to fight Banu. Baba Pahelwan’s defeat would be the third time she had felled a suitor since February of that year, including one Sikh (Khadag Singh) and another Hindu wrestler from West Bengal.

Such "mixed" matches, in which Banu vanquished male wrestlers, were always eponymous for the controversies they stirred. During a bout in Kolhapur in Maharasthra, the audience booed and even stoned Banu for defeating her male opponent, Somasingh Punjabi. The police who were deployed to control the crowds, touted the match a "farce" which aligned with the allegations prevalent at the time, of dummies being put up to challenge Banu in these “mixed” matches. These allegations had forced even then-Chief Minister of Maharashtra, Morarji Desai, to intervene and ban mixed gender matches. Banu complained about the ban to Desai, but continued to fight.

In 1954, Banu notably defeated Russian pro-wrestler Vera Chistilin, known as the "female bear," within a minute in Mumbai's Vallabhbhai Patel Stadium.

Later that same year, she had also wrestled Singapore’s female wrestling champion Raja Laila, and subsequently challenged European wrestlers for a fight.

== Post-wrestling life ==
After the highly publicized wrestling matches in Europe, Banu disappeared from the wrestling scene. Reports by neighbours suggested that Banu faced domestic violence from Salam Pahalwan, who beat her to prevent her from traveling to Europe, resulting in her hands being broken and her legs being fractured.

She and Salam Pahalwan were known to travel between Aligarh, Mumbai, and Kalyan for their dairy business. Eventually, Pahalwan returned to Aligarh, while Banu stayed on in Kalyan. Banu resorted to selling milk, renting out buildings, and selling homemade snacks to make ends meet.

Banu died in 1986.

== Legacy ==
Banu fought and shattered many gender and religious stereotypes, at a time when both wrestling was a taboo for women and being a Muslim woman meant you had to follow the purdah custom.

In 2024, Google Doodle paid tribute to Banu as India’s first woman wrestler.
