= Bholu Pahalwan =

Pakistani professional wrestler (1922–1985)

- Born: Manzoor Hussain; 24 January 1922; Amritsar, Punjab, British India
- Died: 6 March 1985 (aged 63); Lahore, Punjab, Pakistan
- Occupation: Wrestler
- Known for: Pride of Pakistan; Rustam-e-Hind
- Height: 6 ft 1 in (185 cm) (265 lbs. weight)
- Awards: Pride of Performance Award by the Government of Pakistan (1962)

Manzoor Hussain (1922–1985), also known as Bholu Pahalwan, was a Pakistani wrestler and held the world heavyweight title.

== Biography ==
Bholu came from a Kashmiri family of renowned wrestlers from Amritsar and after the independence of Pakistan in 1947, moved to Lahore, Pakistan. He lived in Amritsar until he was nine. Then during one of his school holidays, Bholu moved to Patiala to visit his father, who was also a wrestler. He was Gama Pehelwan's nephew.

He died on 6 March 1985 in Pakistan. His son Nasir Bholu is also a wrestler.

== Career ==
=== 1930s ===
Bholu started his wrestling career in Radhanpur under the guidance of Hamida Pahalwan Rehmaniwala, real name Abdul Hamid Al Maroof Rehmani, who was an official wrestler of that state. In 1935, at age 13, Bholu made his first appearance in a wrestling contest at Lahore. He competed with Ahmad Baksh to a draw for a duration of twelve minutes. On 27 March 1939, Bholu wrestled Ahmad Baksh for the second time in Lahore.

From 1935 till 1940, Bholu succeeded against some of the most competent Indian Pahalwans like Mangal Singh, Kharak Singh, Bora Singh, Bulhar Pahalwan and Aleem Pahalwan of Baroda. During 1940, Bholu competed in the war fund wrestling competitions staged by the government in every part of the subcontinent to boost war funds. Bholu Pahalwan defeated a number of wrestlers, including a local champion, Ghousia Pahalwan, twice in Lahore and for the third time in Bahawalnagar.

=== 1940s ===
In 1944, Bholu defeated Puran Singh Amritsari in Ajain in a recorded time of 6 minutes. Later the same year, he defeated another wrestler with a similar name, Puran Singh Patialawala, in Ludhiana in 3 minutes. In 1945, Bholu beat a Sikh wrestler known as Darbar Singh in Kasur in the shortest duration of one minute.

During the early days after the independence of Pakistan in 1947, Bholu fought Gujranwalia at the Minto Park in Lahore and won the match but later there was a rematch in Karachi. In April 1949, Bholu Pahalwan won the Rustam-i-Pakistan title by beating Younus Gujranwalia Pahalwan for the Pakistani wrestling championship title in a recorded time of 8 minutes. The Governor General of Pakistan, Khawaja Nazimuddin, was the chief guest at this wrestling event, the most significant event in Pakistan's wrestling history. Bholu Pahalwan was declared the first legitimate Wrestling Champion of Pakistan.

=== 1950s ===
Bholu seldom wrestled within the country after these matches. He competed with foreign wrestlers who were active in India during the early 1950s. In Jalandhar and Bombay, Bholu Pahalwan dominated some of the finest men in wrestling Including Emil Koroshenko, George Pencheff, Goldstein, George Zbisko, Zybisko-2 and Harbans Singh.

Bholu had two main akharas, or wrestling dojos, within the country. The Bilal Gunj Akhara was located in Lahore. In 1948, Bholu formed another akhara known as Dar-ul-Sehat at Pakistan Chowk in Karachi. The Dar-ul-Sehat, also known as Bholu-ka-Akhara, trained in Pakistani-style wrestling under the supervision of professional wrestlers. It also provided weight training and bodybuilding facilities to the members. Bholu gave special attention to this institution. He personally trained the members that included 60 to 70 wrestlers.

== Awards and recognition ==
Bholu received the 1962 Pride of Performance Award by the Government of Pakistan. He was granted 20 kanals of land by President Ayub Khan in honour of services rendered to the sport of wrestling in Pakistan. Bholu performed hajj in 1963.

In 1964, the Pakistan Wrestling Association declared him Rustam-e-Zaman, The Pakistani World Champion. They imposed a condition on him that Bholu should wrestle abroad and must win a world title in order to sustain his Pakistani World Title of Rustam-e-Zaman. Since most wrestlers were reluctant to fight him.

In 1967, Bholu offered a sum of 5000 British pounds through promoter Orig Williams of the United Kingdom to anyone who could beat him. In May 1967, Bholu Pahalwan competed in a world championship event sponsored by Eastern Promotions Limited in UK and defeated the Anglo-French heavyweight champion, Henry Perry, for the World Heavyweight Title in Empire Pool, Wembley Stadium, London, England.

After winning the world championship abroad, his status as Rustam-e-Zaman, the Pakistani World Champion, was officially confirmed in his own country in September 1967 by the Pakistan Wrestling Association. The ceremony was held in Karachi and was presided over by the home minister, Kazi Fazlullah.

== See also ==
- Bholu Brothers
