= Bhola Prasad (footballer) =

Indian footballer (born 1987)

Personal information
- Full name: Bhola Prasad
- Date of birth: 3 February 1987 (age 39)
- Place of birth: Mapusa, Goa, India
- Height: 5 ft 7 in (1.70 m)
- Position: Midfielder

Youth career
- Tata FA

Senior career*
Years	Team	Apps	(Gls)
2004–2005	East Bengal		
2005–2006	Tollygunge Agragami		
2006–2010	Mahindra United		
2010–2011	ONGC		
2011	HAL		
2013–2014	Rangdajied United		
2014–2015	ONGC		

International career
2002	India U17		
- * Club domestic league appearances and goals

Bhola Prasad (born 3 February 1987) is a retired Indian professional footballer who played as a midfielder. During his career, he played professionally for East Bengal, Tollygunge Agragami, Mahindra United, ONGC, HAL, and Rangdajied United.

== Club career ==
Prasad began his career with the Tata Football Academy before moving to National Football League side East Bengal in 2004. After spending a season with East Bengal, Prasad moved to Tollygunge Agragami where he played for the club in both the National Football League and the Calcutta Football League. While with Tollygunge Agragami, Prasad was selected for the under-21 West Bengal side that participated in the Dutta Ray Trophy in 2006. After spending a season with Tollygunge, Prasad moved again to Mahindra United in Mumbai. He stayed with the club until May 2010, when the club dissolved after the 2009–10 season.

After the season ended, Prasad joined another local Mumbai side, ONGC, who were promoted from the I-League 2nd Division. After spending just one season with the club as they were relegated, Prasad moved to HAL in Bangalore.

Prasad spent a short time with HAL before moving again to Rangdajied United in the I-League 2nd Division. In 2013, Prasad helped Rangdajied earn promotion from the 2nd Division to the I-League. He made his I-League debut with Rangdajied United on 20 October 2013 against Mohammedan as they were defeated 3–0. At the end of the season, despite Rangdajied finishing two spots above last place, the club were expelled from the I-League.

After leaving Rangdajied United, Prasad rejoined ONGC and participated in local tournaments for the club.

== International career ==
Prasad was part of the India under-17 side which participated in the 2002 AFC U-17 Championship.

== Professional statistics ==
As of match played 1 December 2013

Appearances and goals by club, season and competition
Club	Season	League			Cup		Continental		Total	
Club	Season	Division	Apps	Goals	Apps	Goals	Apps	Goals	Apps	Goals
Rangdajied United	2013–14	I-League	6	0	—	—	—	—	6	0
Career total			6	0	0	0	0	0	6	0

== Honours ==
Rangdajied United

- I-League 2nd Division: 2013
