= Tiger Joginder Singh =

Indian professional wrestler (1919–1990)

Personal information
- Born: Joginder Singh; 1919 Sheron, Tarn Taran district, Punjab Province, British India
- Died: 1 August 1990 (aged 70–71)

Professional wrestling career
- Ring name(s): Tiger Joginder / Jokinder; Tiger Joginder Singh
- Billed height: 5 ft 10 in (178 cm)
- Billed weight: 270 lb (122 kg)
- Billed from: Punjab, India
- Trained by: Harnam Singh
- Debut: 1945

Joginder Singh (1919-August 1, 1990) was an Indian professional wrestler. He was the first All Asia Tag Team Champion, along with King Kong. He was one of the top professional wrestlers of India at that time.

== Early life ==
He was born in the village of Sheron in the Tarn Taran district of Punjab Province, British India into a Sikh family.

== Professional wrestling career ==
=== Singapore ===
In 1948, Tiger Joginder and Arjan Singh Das were signed by Great World's wrestling promoters, where he competed against many top wrestlers like King Kong, Bill Verna, George Zbisko, Tiger Ray Holden and Seelie Samara, and earned fame worldwide.

=== United States ===
Wrestling poster featuring Tiger Joginder and Chief Thunderbird in the main event

Tiger wrestled in the United States in the late 1940s to the early 1950s, with wrestlers such as The French Angel, Ted Christy, Kola Kwariani, Jack Dempsey, Oki Shikina, Lord Carlton, and Benny Trudel. On 8 March 1950, his match with Chief Thunderbird at Paramount Theatre had attracted much interest.

=== India ===
In 1954, Tiger competed in the Rustam-e-Hind (Champion of India) tournament, but lost in the final to Dara Singh. The same year, he defeated European Heavyweight Champion Bert Assirati in front of the 50,000 spectators at Bombay. In 1959, he competed in another professional wrestling tournament Commonwealth Championship, but didn't succeed.

=== Japan ===
On 16 November 1955 in the Japan Wrestling Association, he and King Kong defeated Rikidōzan and Harold Sakata in a two out of three falls match at JWA All Asia Championship tournament final to crown the inaugural All Asia Tag Team Champions. But he failed to capture the All Asia Heavyweight Championship in the single competition.

== Filmography ==
He also did acting in some Indian films in the 1960s with fellow wrestlers Dara Singh, King Kong and Randhawa.

Year	Film	Role	Notes
1964	Samson		Hindi films
1964	Rustom-E-Rome	Plato	Hindi films
1964	Jagga		Punjabi film
1964	Hercules	Wrestler	Hindi films
1964	Badshah		Hindi films
1964	Sandhya Deeper Sikha		Bengali film
1965	Saat Samundar Paar	Wrestler	Hindi films
1965	Rustom-E-Hind	Wrestler	Hindi films
1965	Panch Ratan (1965)	rebel	Hindi films
1965	Mahabharat	Hidimba	Hindi films
1966	Rustom Kaun		Hindi films
1966	Insaaf		Hindi films

== Championship and accomplishments ==
- Japan Wrestling Association
  - All Asia Tag Team Championship (1 time)- with King Kong
