= Pehlwani =

Form of wrestling from the Indian subcontinent

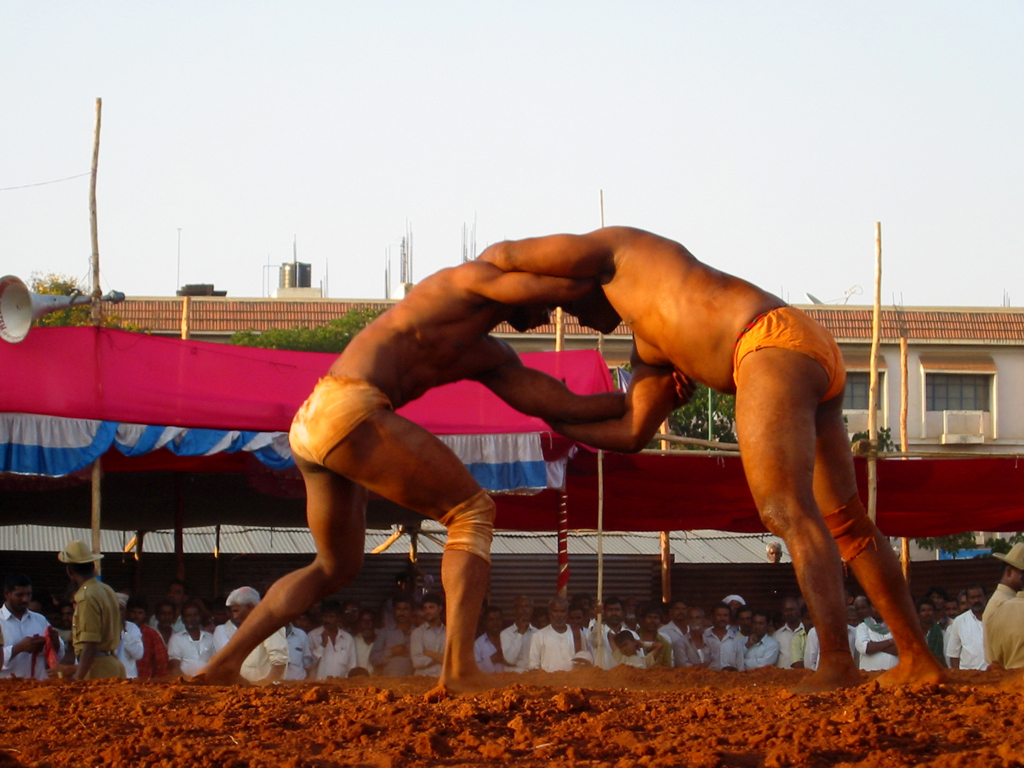
- Pehlwani-style wrestling match in Davangere, Karnataka, India (2005).
- Also known as: Kushti
- Focus: Wrestling
- Country of origin: Indian subcontinent
- Parenthood: Kushti pahlavani Malla-yuddha
- Descendant arts: Catch wrestling
- Olympic sport: No

Pehlwani, also known as Kushti, is a style of grappling and wrestling. It is a form of folk wrestling practiced in the Indian subcontinent. A practitioner of this sport is referred to as a pehlwan while teachers are known as ustad or guru.

Pehlwani is one of the sports that influenced catch wrestling, which in turn partially inspired folkstyle wrestling, freestyle wrestling, and mixed martial arts (MMA).

== Etymology ==
The word pehlwan is derived from the Persian word pahlavan, meaning "champion" or "warrior", originally used to refer to skilled warriors on the battlefield. In India, the term is a title to refer to a wrestler. The words pehlwani and kushti derive from the Persian terms pahlavani (heroic) and kushti (wrestling, lit. killing) respectively, meaning "heroic wrestling".

== History ==
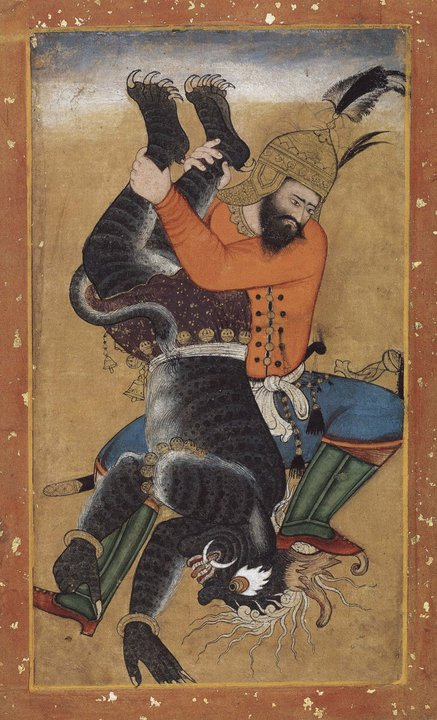
Painting of Rustam wrestling a demon, Mughal, ca.1595

It developed in the Mughal Empire from the Persian kushti pahlavani and the ancient Indian form of wrestling called malla-yuddha.

There are references to malla-yuddha in the two principal ancient Indian epics, the Mahabharata and Ramayana and it is described in the 13th century treatise Malla Purana. In the Persian literary tradition, the Shahnama contains references to pahlavani, with the greatest wrestler in the Persian tradition being regarded as Rustam.

In the Mughal Empire, ruled by a dynasty of Turko-Mongol descent, the influence of Iranian and Mongolian wrestling were incorporated to the Malla-yuddha to give rise to the modern pehlwani, the wrestling style popular throughout India, Pakistan and Bangladesh in modern times

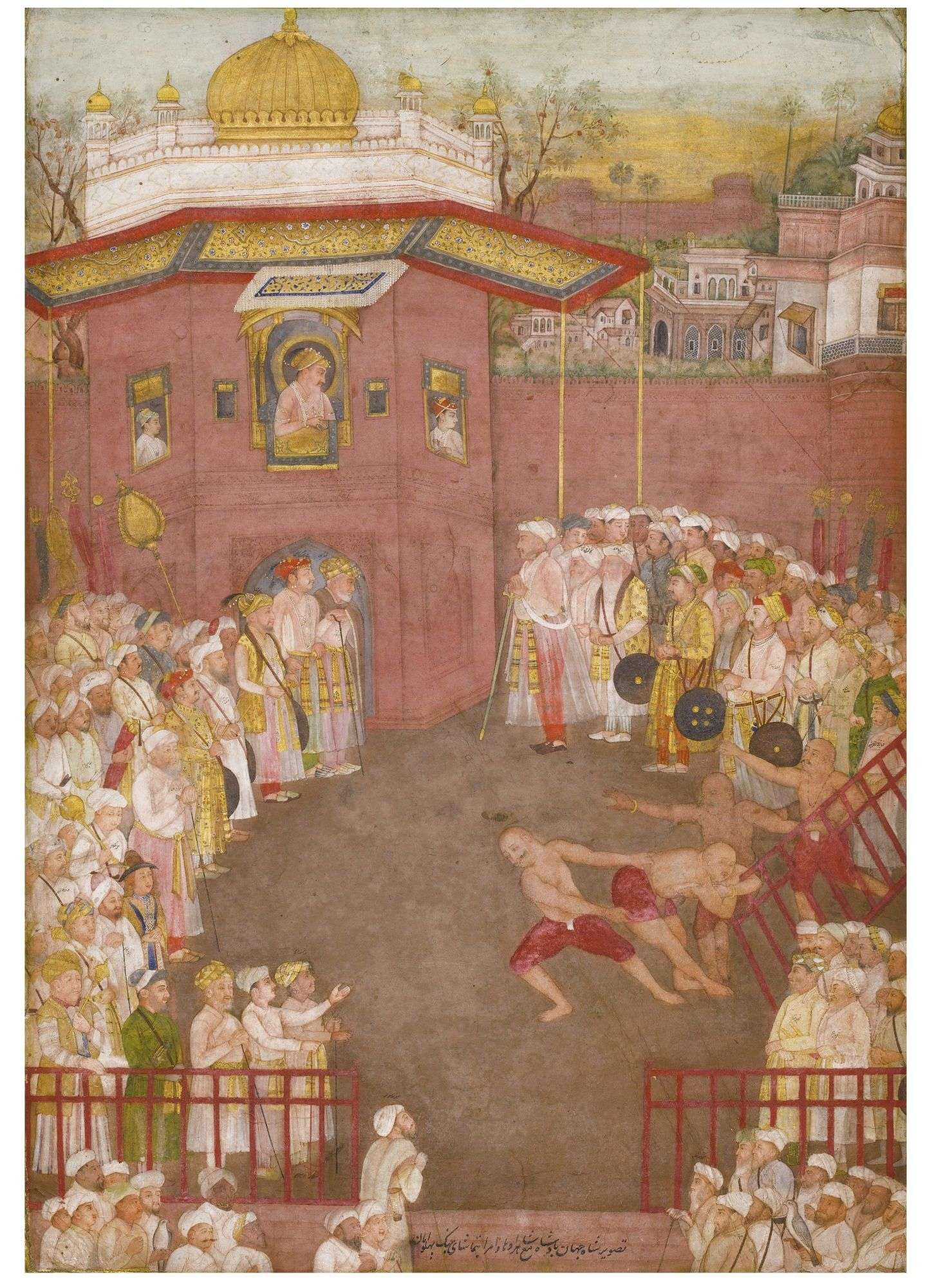
Painting of the Mughal emperor Shah Jahan watching a wrestling match, attributable to Mir Kalan Khan, Delhi or Lucknow, ca.1750

Babur, the first Mughal emperor, was a wrestler himself and could reportedly run very fast for a long distance while holding a man under each arm. Mughal-era wrestlers sometimes even wore bagh nakh on one hand, in a variation called naki ka kushti or "claw wrestling".

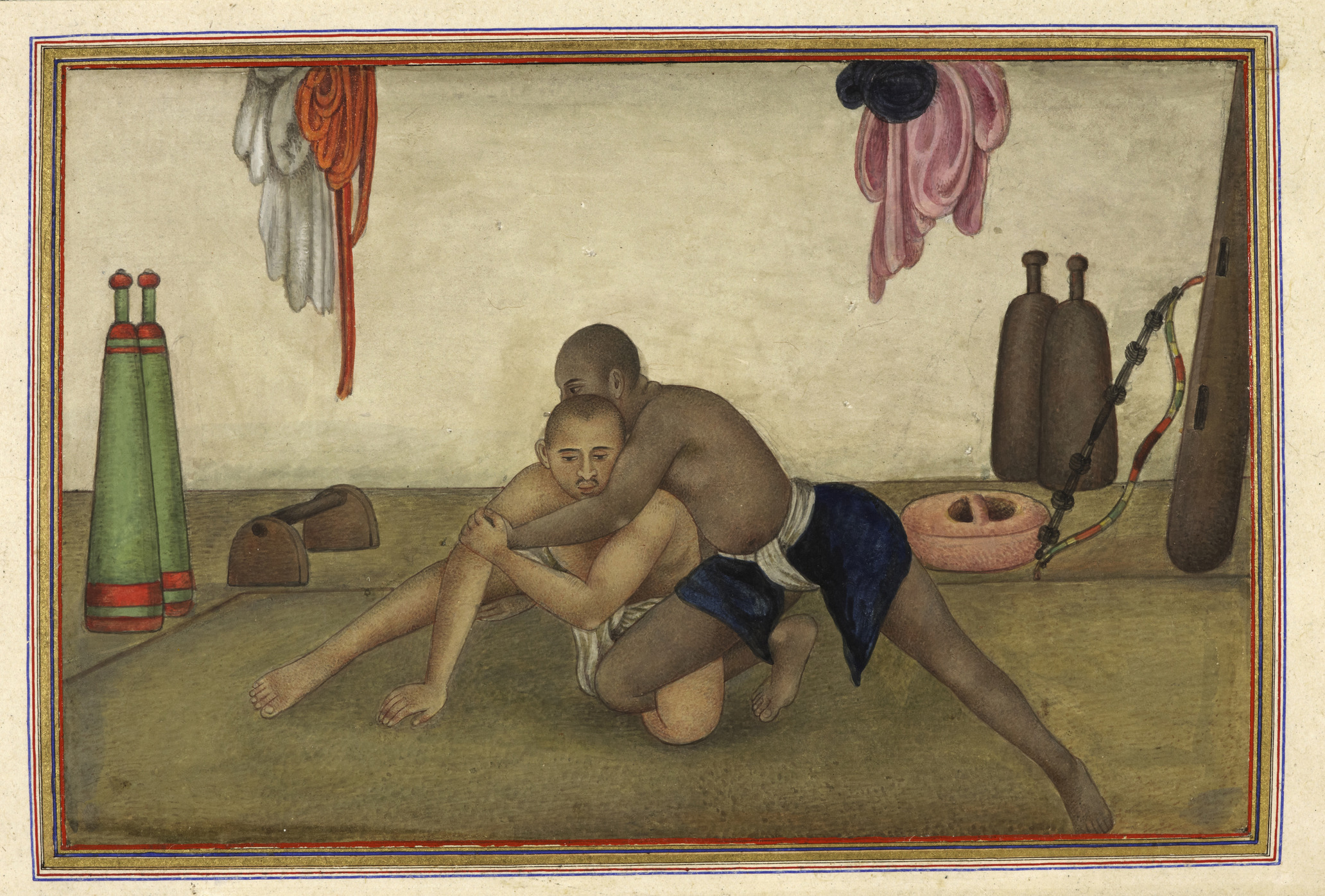
Illustration of two wrestlers (1825).

During the late 17th century, Ramadasa travelled the country encouraging Hindus to be physically active in homage to the god Hanuman. Maratha rulers supported Kushti by offering large sums of prize money for tournament champions. It was said that every Maratha boy at the time could wrestle and even women took up the sport. During the colonial period, local princes sustained the popularity of kushti by hosting matches and competitions. Wrestling was the favourite spectator sport of the Rajputs, and they were said to look forward to tournaments "with great anxiety". Every Rajput prince or chief had a number of wrestling champions to compete for his entertainment. The greatest wrestling centres were said to be Uttar Pradesh and Punjab regions.

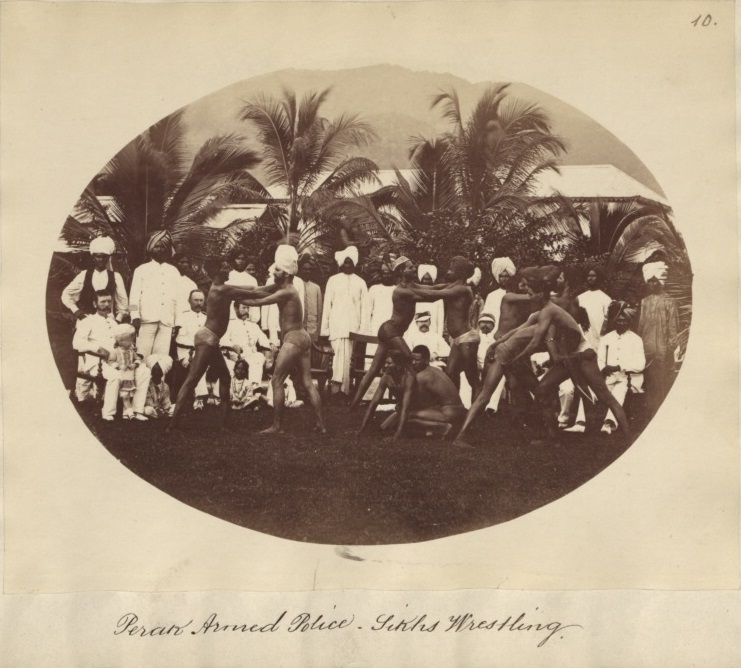
Trained Sikhs in the Perak Armed Police demonstrating pehlwani wrestling, circa 1880–1890.

According to former wrestler Ranjit Singh (pseudonym Bhu Pinder), the pehlwani scene in Punjab during the 1930's had around five-hundred skilled wrestlers, with the majority being Sikhs or Muslims. In the late 1880's and early 1890's, Kala Partapa and Gora Partapa were two renowned heavy-weight wrestlers in the Malwa region of Punjab. In 1898, the Great Gama became the Rustam-e-Hind, with notable victories in London against Ben Roller and Stanislaus Zbyszko following in 1910. Another prominent wrestler was Goonga Pehelwan, who had defeated the Great Gama's nephew, Gama Kalloo, in 1918, causing a stir in the wrestling-scene.

In 1909, a Bengali merchant named Abdul Jabbar Saudagar intended to unite the local youth and inspire them in the anti-British struggle against the colonists through a display of strength by holding a wrestling tournament. Known as Jabbar-er Boli Khela, this competition has continued through independence and the subsequent partition of India. It is still held in Bangladesh every Boishakhi Mela (Bengali new year), accompanied by playing of the traditional sanai (flute) and dabor (drum), and is one of Chittagong's oldest traditions.

Pehlwans also compete in other forms of wrestling and nowadays are also known to cross train in the grappling aspects of judo and jujutsu. Legendary wrestlers from the bygone era like Karl Gotch made tours to India to learn pehlwani and further hone their skills. Gotch was even gifted a pair of mudgar (heavy wooden clubs used for building the arm and shoulder muscles).

The conditioning exercises of pehlwani have been incorporated into many of the conditioning aspects of both catch wrestling and shoot wrestling, along with their derivative systems.

== Training ==
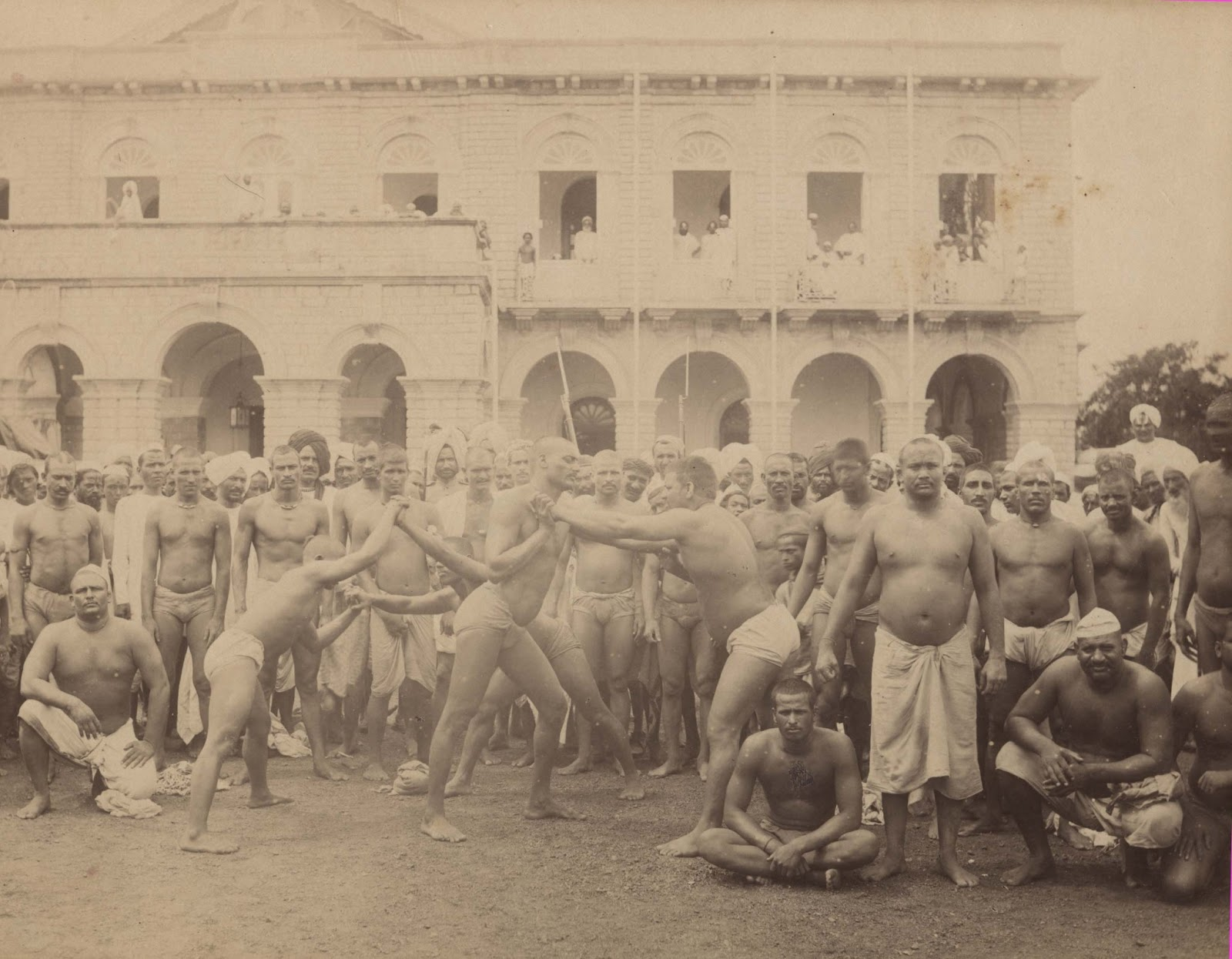
Hyderabadi Pahalwans preparing for pehlwani (1870)

Physical training in the art is referred to as virayam. Although wrestling in the Indian subcontinent saw changes in the Mughal era and the colonial period, the training regimen has remained the same for over 150 years. Many of the most renowned historical pehlwans were born into wrestling families, where their relatives had practiced the art, with the son learning wrestling from his father from an early age. Fledgling wrestlers may start as early as 6, but most begin formal training in their teens. They are sent to an akhara (wrestling-pit) or traditional wrestling school where they are put under the apprenticeship of the local guru. Their only training attire is the kowpeenam or loincloth. A pehlwan aims to achieve a state of self-realization (jivanmukti), which imbued spiritual concepts into the art.

Vyayam or physical training is meant to build strength and develop muscle bulk and flexibility. Exercises that employ the wrestler's own bodyweight include the surya namaskara, shirshasana, and the danda, which are also found in hatha yoga, as well as the bethak. Sawari (from Persian savâri, meaning "the passenger") is the practice of using another person's body weight to add resistance to such exercises. An example of a training technique to strengthen the pehlwan's body was by turning the shaft of a saqiyah (traditional device used to draw water from wells) for a prolonged period of time, with this kind of work normally being done by bullocks or camels.

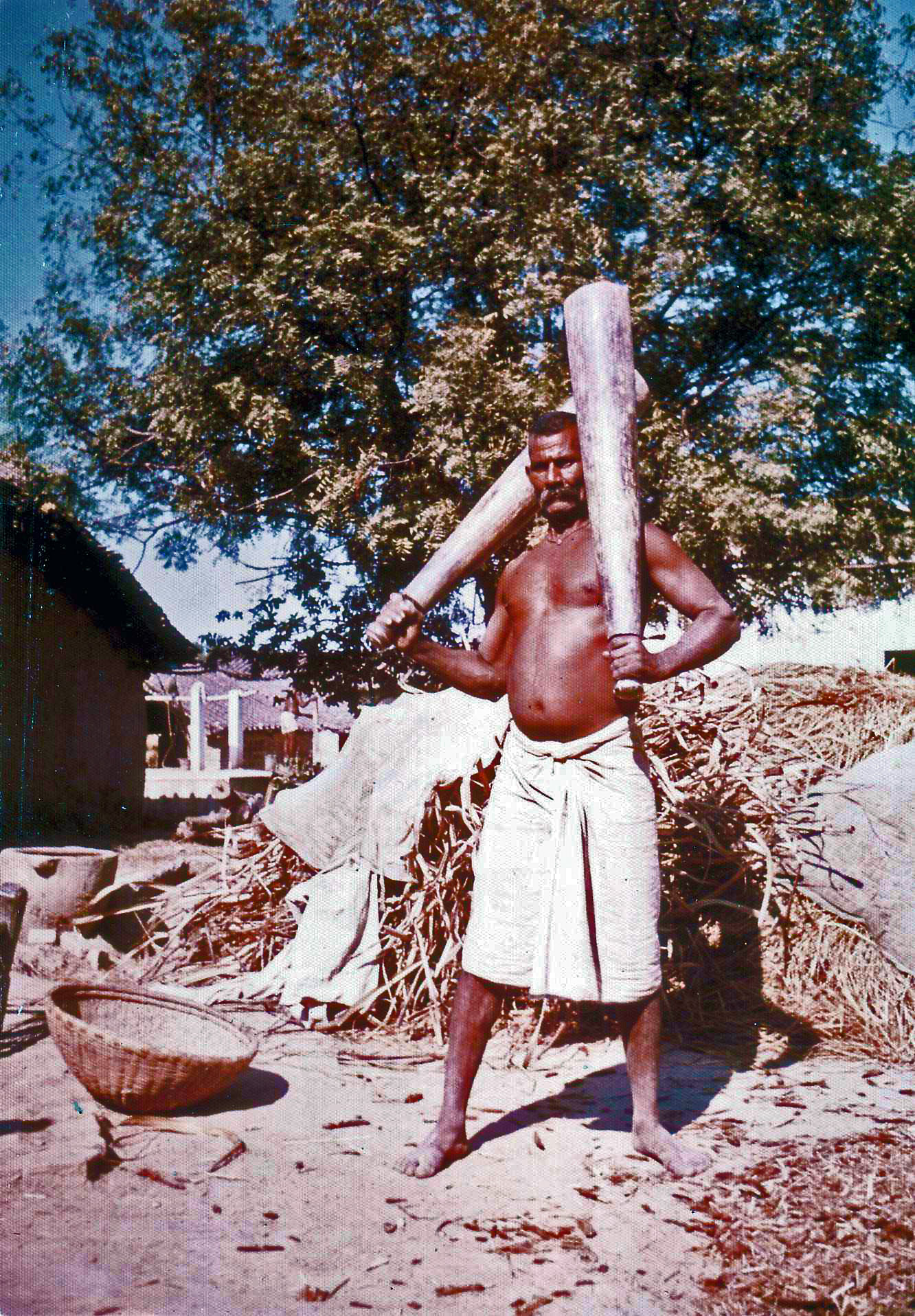
An old Indian pehlwan exercising with Indian clubs near Varanasi.

Exercise regimens may employ the following weight training devices:

- The nal is a hollow stone cylinder with a handle inside.
- The gar nal (neck weight) is a circular stone ring worn around the neck to add resistance to danda and bethak.
- The gada (mace) is a club associated with the god Hanuman. An exercise gada is a heavy round stone attached to the end of a meter-long bamboo stick. Trophies take the form of gada made of silver and gold.
- Indian clubs, a pair of mugdar.

Exercise regimens may also include dhakuli which involve twisting rotations, rope climbing, log pulling and running. Massage is regarded an integral part of a wrestler's exercise regimen.

A typical training day will go as follows:

- 3 AM: Wake up and perform press-ups (danda) and squats (bethak), as many as 4000. Run for 5 miles, followed by swimming and lifting stone and sandbags.
- 8 AM: Teachers watch as the trainees wrestle each other in earth pits continuously for 3 hours. This is around 25 matches in a row. Matches start with the senior wrestlers. The youngest go last.
- 11 AM: Wrestlers are given an oil massage before resting.
- 4 PM: After another massage, trainees wrestle each other for another 2 hours.
- 8 PM: The wrestler goes to sleep.

Some exercises are as follows:

- Deep knee bends
- Dipping push-ups (dand) – may derive from the Zoroastrian practice of genuflecting to the Sun.

== Diet ==
According to the Samkhya school of Hindu philosophy, everything in the universe—including people, activities, and foods—can be sorted into three gunas: sattva (calm/good), rajas (passionate/active), and tamas (dull/lethargic).

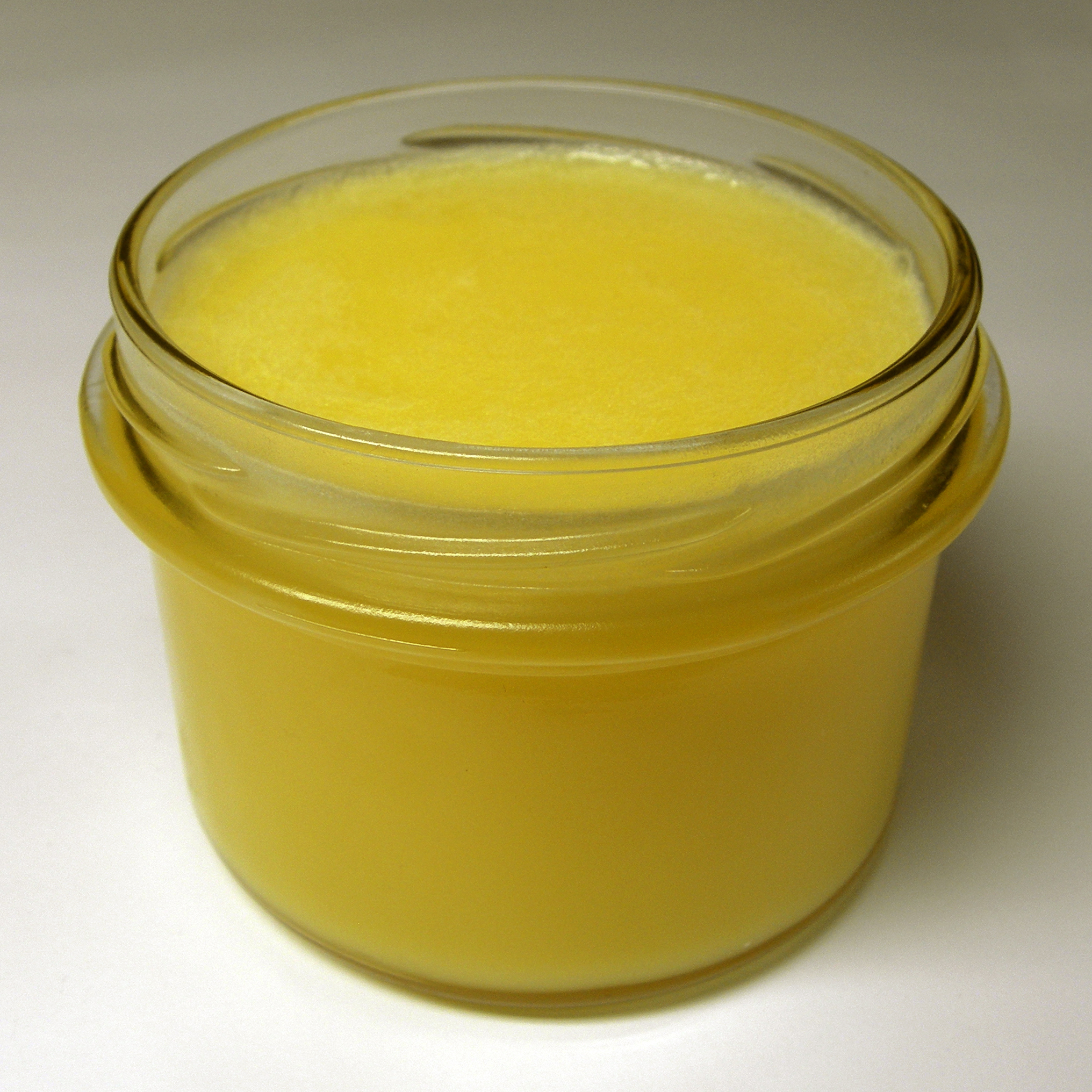
Ghee, amongst the most sattvic of foods consumed for wrestlers

As a vigorous activity, wrestling has an inherently rajasic nature, which pehlwans counteract through the consumption of sattvic foods. Milk and ghee are regarded as the most sattvic of foods and, along with almonds, constitute the holy trinity of the pehlwani khurak (from Persian خوراک پهلوانی khorâk-e pahlavâni), or diet. A common snack for pehlwans are chickpeas that have been sprouted overnight in water and seasoned with salt, pepper and lemon; the water in which the chickpeas were sprouted is also regarded as nutritious. Various articles in the Indian wrestling monthly Bharatiya Kushti have recommended the consumption of the following fruits: apples, wood-apples, bananas, figs, pomegranates, gooseberries, lemons, and watermelons. Orange juice and green vegetables are also recommended for their sattvic nature. Many pehlwan eat meat due to its high protein content.

Famed pehlwan Dara Singh used to eat more than a pound of meat every day.

Ideally, wrestlers are supposed to avoid sour and excessively spiced foods such as chatni and achar as well as chaat. Mild seasoning with garlic, cumin, coriander, and turmeric is acceptable. The consumption of alcohol, tobacco, and paan is strongly discouraged.

== Techniques ==
It has been said that most of the moves found in the wrestling forms of other countries are present in kushti, and some are unique to the Indian subcontinent. These are primarily locks, throws, pins, and submission holds. Unlike its ancient ancestor malla-yuddha, kushti does not permit strikes or kicks during a match. Among the most favoured manoeuvres are the dhobi paat (shoulder throw) and the kasauta (strangle pin). Other moves include the baharli, dhak, machli gota and the multani. Two fundamental components of pehlwani are stance (paintra), and moves/counter-moves (dav-pech). Dav-pech comprises many different kinds of feints and parries. Paintra is the footing of the wrestler on the ground, which is important for attacks or retreats. It is also important for the wrestler to be able to read his opponent to anticipate their next action.

=== Rules ===
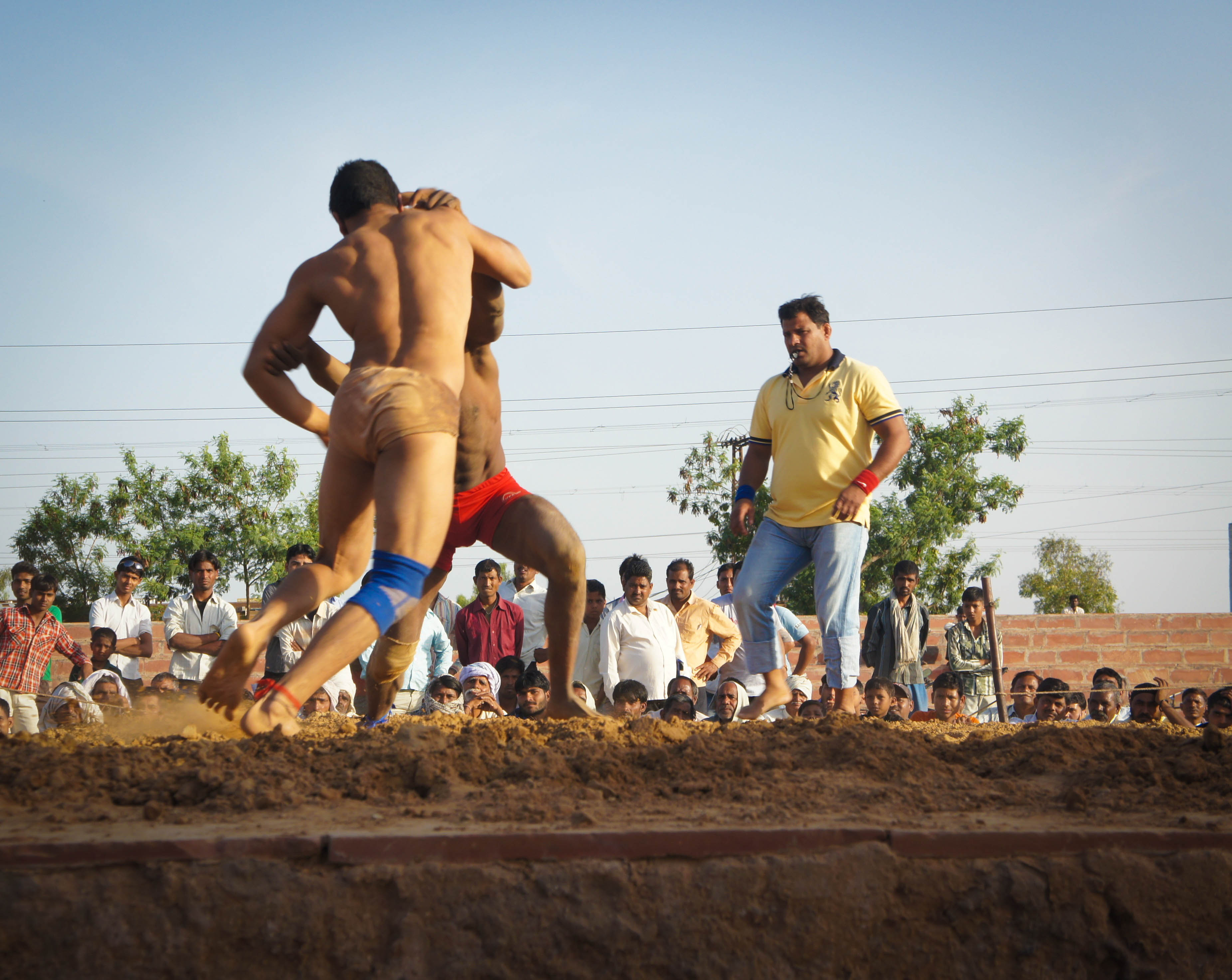
Kushti in Bharatpur

Wrestling competitions known as dangal (wrestling bout) or kushti, are held in villages and as such are variable and flexible. The area is either a circular or square shape, measuring at least fourteen feet across. Rather than using modern mats, pehlwans train and compete on dirt floors. Before training, the floor is raked of any pebbles or stones. Buttermilk, oil, and red ochre are sprinkled to the ground, giving the dirt its red hue. Water is added every few days to keep it at the right consistency; soft enough to avoid injury but hard enough so as not to impede the wrestlers' movements. Every match is preceded by the wrestlers throwing a few handfuls of dirt from the floor on themselves and their opponent as a form of blessing. Despite the marked boundaries of the arena, competitors may go outside the ring during a match with no penalty. There are no rounds but the length of every bout is specified beforehand, usually about 25–30 minutes. If both competitors agree, the length of the match may be extended. Match extensions are typically around 10–15 minutes. Unlike mat-based wrestling, there is no point scoring system; a win is achieved by pinning the opponent's shoulders and hips to the ground simultaneously, although victory by knockout, stoppage or submission is also possible. In some variations of the rules, pinning only the shoulders is sufficient. Bouts are overseen by a referee inside the ring and a panel of two judges watching from the outside.

== Titles ==
Official titles awarded to pehlwani champions are as follows. Note that the title Rustam is actually the name of an Iranian hero from the Shahnameh epic.

- Rustam-e-Hind: "Champion of India" or "Rustam of India".
  - Winners: Dara Singh, Sadika Gilgoo (Siddique Pehlwan), Krishan Kumar from Haryana, Imam Baksh Pahalwan, Hamida Pahalwan, Vishnupant Nagrale, Dadu Chowgule and Harishchandra Birajdar, Mangla Rai. Nagrale was the first wrestler ever to hold this title. Until modern-times, the Rustum-i-Hind title was in-use to award champions in India.
- Rustum-e-Pakistan (also spelled as Rustum-i-Pakistan): Champion of Pakistan.
- Rustam-e-Panjab: (also spelled Rustam-i-Panjab): Champion of Punjab, India.
- Rustum-e-Punjab: Champion of Punjab, Pakistan.
- Bharat Kesari: Best heavyweight wrestler in Hindi.
  - Recent winners: include Chandra Prakash Mishra (Gama Pahalwan), Krishan Kumar (1986), Rajiv Tomar, and Palwinder Singh Cheema (Punjab police).
- Hind Kesari: Champion of India.
  - Winners: Harishchandra Birajdar (1969), Krishan Kumar (1986), Amol Barate (2013), Sunil Salunkhe (2015).
- Maharashtra Kesari: "Lion of Maharashtra".
  - Winners: Narsing Yadav (three-time winner).
- Rustam-e-Zaman: World Champion. The Great Gama became known as Rustam-e-Zaman when he defeated Stanislaus Zbyszko in 1910.
- Amazon of Aligarh: This is an exclusive unofficial title given to a female wrestler, Hamida Banu, in the first half of the 20th century.

== Notable practitioners ==
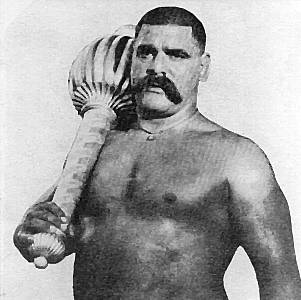
The Great Gama in 1916

One of the most famous practitioners of pehlwani was The Great Gama, who is also considered one of the greatest wrestlers of all time. Others include:

- Gulam
- Imam Baksh Pahalwan
- Dara Singh
- Bholu Pahalwan
- Kodi Rammurthy Naidu
- Jatindra Charan Guho (Gobar Goho)
- Sushil Kumar

== See also ==
- Pahlevani wrestling, traditional Iranian wrestling
- Pahlevan of Iran
- History of physical training and fitness
- Wrestling in India
- Wrestling in Pakistan
- Wrestling in Iran
- Indian martial arts
- Sumo, Japanese form of full-contact wrestling
- Beach wrestling, type of wrestling
- Gatka, martial art from the Punjab region
- Gatta gusthi, wrestling form of Kerala, India
- Inbuan wrestling, wrestling form of Mizoram, India
- Malakhra, wrestling form of Sindh, Pakistan
- Mukna, wrestling form of Manipur, India
- Vajra-mushti, Hindu martial arts weapon
