= Akram Pahalwan =

Pakistani professional wrestler (1930–1987)

Personal information
- Born: 1930 Amritsar, Punjab, British India
- Died: 12 April 1987 (aged 57) Lahore, Punjab, Pakistan

Professional wrestling career
- Ring name(s): Akram Pahalwan; Iki Pehlwan
- Billed height: 5 ft 10 in (1.78 m)
- Billed weight: 220 lb (100 kg; 16 st)
- Trained by: The Great Gama
- Debut: 1953
- Retired: 12 December 1976

Akram Pahalwan (Punjabi: اکرم پہلوان) (1930 – 12 April 1987), also known as Iki Pehlwan, was a Pakistani wrestler and a part of the Bholu Brothers tag team in professional wrestling during the late 1960s. Some of his opponents were Haji Afzal (1963), George Gordienko (1967), Anton Geesink (1968), Antonio Inoki (1976) and Halal Mahdame (1964).

== Professional wrestling career ==
Pahalwan was initially trained in Lahore as a student of The Great Gama. Akram started his professional wrestling career in 1953, wrestling Ugandan and Kenyan wrestlers in East Africa. He defeated Mahindar Singh in Nairobi with a submission hold in a match where Singh’s elder brother was the referee. The East African public named him "The Lion" when he defeated the Ugandan Champion Idi Amin.

Pahalwan participated in around 280 major wrestling events during the 1950s. In 1958, he was proclaimed the Champion of Malaya in Singapore when he defeated Hari Ram.

During the 1960s, Pahalwan also remained a part of the Bholu Brothers wrestling team. In 1965, Pahalwan defeated Indian wrestler Hardam Singh at the National Stadium, Karachi in the third round. In 1967 he toured UK. The Bholu Brothers were rated 10th in the 1968 tag team world ratings. In 1968 Akram wrestled in Suriname, South America where he was beaten unconscious by Anton Geesink. Later in East Pakistan (now Bangladesh) he injured his left arm in a match against Bill Verna of Australia.

In 1976, the Bholu Brothers claimed to be the world champions and slated Pahalwan to fight Antonio Inoki. On the day of the match Inoki defeated Pahalwan with a chicken wing armlock. Pahalwan did not submit, but the ring doctor stopped the match because his left arm broke under the submission hold. Pahalwan's wrestling career ended after his match with Inoki.
