= Chicky Starr =

Puerto Rican professional wrestler (born 1958)

Personal information
- Born: José Anibal Laureano Colón; June 24, 1958 (age 68) Vega Baja, Puerto Rico

Professional wrestling career
- Ring name(s): Chicky Perón; Chicky Starr; Carlos Perón; El Golden Boy; El Rey de la Lucha Libre
- Billed height: 5 ft 11 in (180 cm)
- Billed weight: 218 lb (99 kg)
- Billed from: Vega Baja, Puerto Rico
- Trained by: Su Majestad El Profe
- Debut: 1975

José Anibal Laureano Colón (born June 24, 1958) is a Puerto Rican professional wrestler and manager. He is better known by his ring name, Chicky Starr. He is best known for his work in the World Wrestling Council (WWC) and International Wrestling Association (IWA) of Puerto Rico. Starr won the WWC Universal Championship when he defeated Carlito in San Lorenzo, Puerto Rico in early 2003. Laureano has led stables including The Chicky Starr Sports Club and the Starr Corporation.

Laureano has managed Abdullah the Butcher, Stan Hansen, Bruiser Brody, Ron Starr, Al Perez, Kareem Muhammad, Grizzly Boone, Jason the Terrible, Joe Leduc, Hercules Ayala, "Sadistic" Steve Strong, "Nature Boy" Buddy Landell, Ronnie Garvin, Harley Race, "The Raging Bull" Manny Fernández, Leo Burke, The Sheepherders, The Wild Samoans (Afa and Sika), The Samoan Swat Team, The Polynesian Prince, The Alaskan Hunters, Korsita Korchenko, Tama the Islander, Dan Kroffat, Scott Hall, Abbuda Dein, The Iron Sheik, Killer Khalifa, Invader #2, Crash the Eliminator, The Skywalker, Huracan Castillo Jr., Victor the Bodyguard, "Dirty" Dutch Mantell, Ricky Banderas, Tower of Doom, Shane the Glamour Boy, "Mr.Ray-tings" Ray Gonzalez, Steve Corino, "The Precious One" Gilbert, Black Pain, The Sons of Samoa, Los Renegados del Infierno, Thunder and Lightning, Mighty Ursus, among others.

== Professional wrestling career ==
=== Early career (1975–1985) ===
Starr formed a tag team with Antonio Pantojas known as the Peron Brothers for Stampede Wrestling in Canada. They wrestled as heels from 1981 to 1982 in Stampede. Starr often wrestled as a mid-card wrestler and in the opening matches at house shows.

From 1984 to mid 1985, Starr performed in San Antonio's Southwest Championship Wrestling (SCW). On September 9, 1984, he and Brett Sawyer won the SCW Southwest Tag Team Championship from The Fabulous Blonds (Eric Embry and Dan Greer) but dropped the belts back to The Fabulous Blonds on October 9. Starr also won the SCW Southwest Junior Heavyweight Championship from Embry, but later lost it to Ron Sexton.

=== WWC rebrand (1985–1991, 1995–1997, 1998–2000) ===
In late 1985, Starr appeared in Puerto Rico World Wrestling Council (WWC). He became a villain when he accused his mentor El Invader #1 of holding him back. Starr challenged Invader #1 to a match, during which he attacked his mentor with a steel chair. Starr and Invader #1 feuded from the mid-1980s through the early 1990s. They competed in a "Retirement vs. Hair" match won by Invader #1 at the 1987 WWC Anniversary card. This feud ended in 1991 when Starr left the WWC to start a new promotion called the American Wrestling Federation (AWF) with Hercules Ayala, former WWC announcer Hugo Savinovich and Gloria Uribe.

Starr also became a manager and in early 1986, starting a faction initially known as El Club Deportivo (The Sports Club). He recruited Victor Rodriguez as his bodyguard. He also managed his kayfabe cousin Ron Starr. Other members of his group were Abdullah the Butcher, Al Perez, Sadistic Steve Strong, and Manny Fernandez. They feuded with El Invader #1 and Carlos Colon. In 1988, Starr defeated Rufus R. Jones to win the King of Wrestling crown.

The feud with Invader #1 resumed in 1997 when Starr returned to WWC. He teamed with Invader #2 who had turned against Invader #1 earlier that year. Starr briefly made an alliance with Invader #1 that only lasted a couple of weeks before they started feuding again. The same year, Starr created a new alliance called Starr Corporation with Victor "the Bodyguard" Rodriguez and Angel Rodriguez. Starr merged Starr Corporation with Ray Gonzalez's Familia del Milenio in the late 1990s and early 2000s.

=== Starr Corporation (2000–2001) ===
In the International Wrestling Association (IWA), the Starr Corporation was composed of Pain, Víctor "The Bodyguard" Rodriguez, Angel Rodriguez, AAA/TNA's "El Mesias" Ricky Banderas and Dutch Mantell. They feuded with Savio Vega, Shane The Glamour Boy, Los Malcriaos (Miguel Perez, Jr. and Huracan Castillo, Jr.). Starr and Victor "The Bodyguard" Rodriguez also wrestled as a tag team version of Starr Corporation and were IWA World Tag Team Champions. At Juicio Final 2001, Savio Vega (Juan Rivera) as his alternate character of Hombre Dinamita and Chicky Starr faced each other in a match known as the cage of death where the first to reach a set of handcuff keys could release their team to take on the other. Vega's team was composed by Shane Sewell, Apolo (Germán Figueroa), Jesús Castillo and Kane, while he was supported by the Starr Corporation. In March 2001, Lucha Libre 101 tried to join the Starr Corporation, but Starr declined. At Juicio Final 2001, Vega and Castillo won a Double Caribbean Strap Match over Starr and Rodríguez, a contest with traditional strap match rules but in which the adversaries were strapped to each other. In his continued feud, Tiger Ali Singh was brought to take on Vega, but failed. Later in the same event, Vega attacked Starr and Rodríguez, who lost the titles due to the interference. The Starr Corporation exploited differences that were emerging between different members of Los Boricuas to gain the upper hand in the ongoing feud. Resuming the feud between factions, Castillo and Pérez defeated Starr and Faraón Zaruxx. On June 16, 2001, Laureano joined Bouncer Bruno in an unsuccessful challenge for the Tag Team Championship. On the same night, the Starr Corporation turned on Banderas after he was involved in a confrontation with the other members. On August 4, 2001, Starr announced that he was firing all but one member of the Starr Corporation, being upset that Víctor Rodríguez had turned face on the group to save Banderas and lost a retirement afterwards. However, this was sorely received by the other members of the stable, who adopted Angel Rodríguez as their new leader and attacked him. They continued ambushing Starr during the following weeks. After defeating a tag team known as Los Gringos (Dlo Brown and Chaz) and forcing one of them to leave IWA-PR, Apolo and Sewell were attacked by the Starr Corporation. Starr made the save, creating a new alliance. At Rumble Boricua, Laureano defeated Angel Rodríguez.

=== Universal Heavyweight Champion (2002–2003) ===
On September 28, 2002, Laureano appeared in WWC's Aniversario 2002 and interfered in a match between Carly Colón and Konnan. WWC Continued promoting its product in Televicentro's programming, this time as part of a multi-program collaboration that began with segments in a show named Zumbate where a hidden camera prank was played on Laureano. The angle was continued at SuperXclusivo, where Colón and Santarosa reached a truce of sorts, but Laureano interrupted and argued with both. A wrestling special was then aired in Zúmbate, where several members of the roster performed. In the same program, three masked wrestlers that were supposedly randomly recruited were revealed to be Santarrosa, Carly and Eddie Colón, which led to Laureano attacking all three. On November 9, 2002, the Starr Corporation assaulted Eddie Colón. On November 14, 2002, Laureano participated in another Televicentro show, this time Club Sunshine where he confronted Sunshine Logrono while the latter was performing under the wrestling-related character of Vitin Alicea. On November 30, Laureano wrestled Colón, who attacked him until he was left bleeding. In May 2003, it was reported that Laureano would be joining a new independent promotion, New Wrestling Nation, in the role of trainer. However, the plans with the company were suddenly abandoned following an apparent failure in communication between its owner and Hugo Savinovich. After a prolonged hiatus, Laureano was scheduled for an event held by independent promotion New Generation Wrestling. In the event, named Maldicion Chickystarriana in his honor, he was supposed to join Hamed Martinez (who had been wrestling a character that was a homage to him, named El Chickystarriano) to wrestle in a no disqualification match. However, the event was later cancelled. On July 12, 2003, WWC announced the return of Laureano to the promotion during the upcoming Aniversario event, following a week of negotiations where an undisclosed amount of money that was owed to him was paid. In his return, he wrestled Ricky Santana to a double disqualification. Laureano also managed Mike Awesome in his unsuccessful bid to defeat Carly Colón. He then got disqualified un unsuccessful bid for the Television Championship, by hitting his opponent with a bat.

=== WWC ownership (2003–2004) ===
In the same event, Laureano attacked Carlos Colón but was stopped, being then confronted by the storyline co-owner of WWC, Ramón Álvarez, who ordered him retire the latter or be fired from the promotion citing that he disliked being bossed but had no option. Laureano unsuccessfully challenged Colón and was once again confronted by Álvarez, who asked if he was wearing a t-shirt with the Dominican flag that he was given. Despite responding in the affirmative, he the revealed a shirt with the flag of Puerto Rico in a sudden face turn, only to be attacked by the entire heel stable. Laureano then interfered in a fire match between the two storyline co-owners, attacking Álvarez with a torch and telling Jovica that he was interested in his rival's half of the stocks. In his return to the ring, he defeated Diamante Dominicano by disqualification. On September 6, 2003, Laureano defeated Álvarez with the help of Logrono to win 50% of WWC's stocks. Both met again in a match that ended with no winner due to the intervention of the heel stable. On September 20, 2003, the Broncos ambushed him and his wife while they were entering a WWC card. In October, WWC began airing segments where Laureano talked to someone by phone and requested his help as a bodyguard, implying that he was contacting Víctor Rodríguez. However, it was later revealed that it was Milton Adorno in his return to the promotion. This alliance was short lived, since the latter left WWC two weeks later. On October 25, 2003, Laureano defeated Álvarez and Estrada by disqualification and revealed the new member of the Starr Corporation, Wilfredo Alejandro. However, like his previous associate this wrestler left the promotion shortly afterwards. Individually, his matches with Álvarez ended without a clear winner. This led to a match where a bat was placed 15 feet above the ring, which Álvarez won. Afterwards, Laureano left the promotion suddenly.

=== Various promotions ===
During this period of inactivity, he was the first guest in professional wrestling radio show, Desde la Tercera Cuerda. Laureano exited this hiatus on February 28, 2004, when he participated in an event named Conquista Antillana for independent promotion Extreme Wrestling Organization. Shortly the following weeks, he continued this tour in other independent promotions, such as National Wrestling Organization (NWO) and LPW. On June 20, 2004, Víctor Rodríguez died of a heart attack, with Laureano leading the rest of the Chickystarrianos in homage during his funeral, during which the original flag of the stable was buried along the casket. Shortly afterwards, Laureano made a one-night return to the IWA to lead a commemorative card. On July 17, 2004, Laureano made his return to WWC at Camino a la Gloria-Fase 2, defeating Tahitian Warrior and aided Milton Adorno in his own match. He quickly went after the heel faction led by Álvarez, defeating one f his minions, Estrada. He and Adorno debuted as a tag team in a loss to Álvarez and Castillo, when Diabólico hit him with brass knuckles. Castillo and El Bronco defeated Laureano and El Nene. On August 7, 2004, Laureano presented Angel Rodríguez and announced that the Starr Corporation was back. Later that night, he joined Carlos Colón for the first time after three decades of feuding and defeated Álvarez and Frontán. He soon began recruiting members for the Starr Corporation, presenting new arrival Eric Pérez as its new membre. Laureano also worked dates for the Xtreme Wrestling Alliance and XWE. The first date of the Aniversario 2004 tour, Laureano lost to Álvarez. the following day, he defeated Diabólico. To close the tour, he defeated Dallas. On August 28, 2004, WWC aired a segment where Laureano was about to hold a reunion with Castillo, later that day he became the latest member of the Starr Corporation. Both teamed to defeat Álvarez and Diabólico. Individually, Laureano continued the feud and defeated the latter. However, Diabólico won a rematch at Fase 3. Laureano the teamed with Joe Bravo but were defeated by the World Tag Team Champions. He was then given a more aggressive persona despite remaining a face, often getting disqualified for attacking his opponents with a bat. At El Llamado de la Sangre, Laureano won the World Tag Team Championship. At Cierre de Temporada, Laureano joined Castillo and Angel Rodríguez in a win over part of the heel stable. Both would team again on January 6, 2005, winning the World Tag Team Championship. On January 8, 2005, the tag team champions defeated Estrada and Álvarez. Individually, he lost to Estrada. The tag team champions then wrestled Estrada and Diabólico to a no contest. Following a controversial finish where they retained in a rematch, Jovica was added as a special referee. Castillo and Laureano defeated Estrada and Diabólico in another match. Individually, Estrada lost to Laureano. On February 5, 2005, Laureano and Castillo lost the titles to Diamante and Diabólico. He then resumed his feud with Álvarez, wrestling to a no-contest. Laureano then teamed with a returning Colón, Sr. On April 9, 2005, a now-heel Pérez defeated Laureano. He then defeated Puerto Rico Heavyweight Champion Bryan by disqualification. At Summer Madness, he wrestled Diamante. In July, he participated at NWG's Anniversary show.

=== WWC/NWS alliance ===
During the second week of August 2005, it was informed that Laureano would be joining New Wrestling Stars (NWS), a large independent promotion that was operating on a substantial budget. Aniversario 2005 was a collaboration between WWC and NWS, and Laureano lost to Estrada. The final date of the event, he wrestled José Estrada to a no contest. Laureano was unable to wrestle in La Hora de la Verdad 3 due to a purported injury, so he managed Profe in his scheduled match with Diamante. However, it was later revealed that he was involved in the kidnapping of his adversary's wife and proceeded to attack him along several heels. In March, he participated in cards for PEW and PWA. In NWS he managed Adorno while not wrestling himself. VQ. While NWS reorganized after a schism where half of its personnel splintered to for World Wrestling Stars, Laureano was announced for a PRWA card. However he cancelled this date after deciding to return to WWC. On June 10, 2006, Laureano challenged for the title of NWG. On June 30, 2006, he reappeared at the promotion's So Hot Wrestling Summer. At the second Bruiser Brody Cup, Laureano received an homage and a cake for his birthday, but Estrada interrupted and attacked him. Later that night he teamed with Castillo in a disqualification win over Estrada and Arson. The champions retained in a rematch held the following week. On July 7, 2006, Laureano appeared in a NWG card and wrestled Eli Rodríguez to a no contest. He was unable to meet his next compromise with this promotion. At WWC, he lost to Montalvo after Estrada interfered. On July 15, 2006, Laureano and Estrada wrestled to a no contest. He then faced Álvarez in a match where he was attacked until Eddie Colón made the save. This pattern continued in a match against Montalvo, where Orlando Colón made the save. The following event, he joined the rest of the New Starr Corporation in a loss to Poder Supremo. Laureano also worked as manager for Castillo and Joel, as they won and defended the World Tag Team Championship. At Septiembre Negro, he defeated masked wrestler Jason X. Later in the tour the Starr Corporation defeated the Poder Supremo. The final night of the tour, he defeated Hannibal by disqualification. On September 9, 2006, Laureano teamed with Figueroa at independent promotion WWR, amid rumors that he was leaving WWC. During this time, he became involved in negotiations with NWS. Despite this, he made a final appearance for WWC on September 9, 2006, unsuccessfully challenging for the World Tag Team Championship. For days later, Laureano returned to the NWS and was placed in a match against masked wrestler Reinstein. However, this return was short-lived since NWS confronted internal issues that led to most of its roster leaving, including Laureano himself who returned to WWC and managed Castillo. On October 5, 2006, he participated in a match where Los Hermanos Perron reunited in order to raise funds for El Profe's wife. Prior to Halloween Wrestling Xtravaganza, Laureano lost to Arson. At the event, he teamed with Black Rose in a win over Rudy and Dominique. Laureano also participated in the RWA's Halloween Resurrection event. In WWC, he continued serving as manager of the New Starr Corporation until Lockout, where Castillo turned on him. After WWC closed its season, PRWA scheduled him to compete for the PRWA World Xtreme Heavyweight Championship. However, he was attacked by Castillo. This marked the final stage of this WWC run. In January, Laureano helped launch a new independent promotion, All Star Wrestling. In April, Laureano appeared in PRWA as both a performer and also awarding the eponymous Chicky Starr Cup to its winner.

=== New Starr Corporation ===
On April 14, 2007, Laureano appeared in the IWA and participated in a ceremony in honor of Víctor Quiñones. Shortly afterwards, he joined the regular roster managing Noel Rodríguez. He quickly became involved in a rivalry with Orlando Toledo, the interim President of the IWA, after aiding Rodríguez in a match for the Hardcore Championship. He served as special referee in a match between Cotto and Joe Bravo. On May 5, 2007, Huertas appeared backstage and was confronted by Toledo, later in the show he was shown warning Cotto about thrusting Laureano, prompting a confrontation between both veterans. At Juicio Final, Laureano lost to Joan Guzmán after the Caballleros de la Revolución cheated. Later in the event, he was involved in a confrontation with Huertas after being accidentally hit during a save. On May 19, 2007, Laureano and Rodríguez teamed to defeat Los Caballeros de la Revolución. Upon learning who was responsible for the attack at Juicio Final, Laureano confronted Rodríguez about keeping silence. Afterwards, La Revolución Dominicana extended an offer to become their manager, but Laureano did not immediately accept despite letting Rodríguez know that he no longer trusted him. Laureano was one of several IWA talents that participated in Junte para la Historia, a card held on June 14, 2007, in memorial of deceased wrestler Omar Pérez Barreto. At the José Miguel Pérez Cup, Laureano and Huertas formed an alliance after Rodríguez showed a video proving that it was an accident. However this was short lived, as later in the event the Starr Corporation turned on Huertas and joined La Revolución in an attack over him and Los Rabiosos, giving birth to the New Starr Revolution Corporation. Afterwards, Laureano expressed that they intended to conquer all championships, prompting a confrontation with the also-heel stable of Orlando Toledo over the World Heavyweight Championship. At Armageddon, Dennis Rivera accepted the invitation of Rodríguez to join them despite the intervention of his father and brother, being welcomed by Laureano. After Bravo left the company, Laureano focused on insubordinate minion Guzmán. At Golpe de Estado, the New Starr Revolution Corporation attacked Guzmán after he accepted the invitation to join Los Encapuchados de la Calle. IWA then aired a segment where Los Hermanos Rodríguez mentioned that they hadn't seen Laureano. The sudden turn caused suspicion in the New Starr Revolution Corporation and Toledo's Club Élite, with all factions remaining independent. However, afterwards Laureano entered a hiatus of several months. On March 15, 2008, he reappeared in IWA programming. In his return, Laureano served as the special referee in a match between González and Cotto, helping the former win after being attacked by the latter. On March 29, 2008, Noel Rodríguez and Dennis Rivera turned on Laureano, ending the Starr Corporation.

On April 13, 2008, Los Hermanos Rodríguez (now known as Los Dueños de la Malicia) severely beat a team that had been sent by Laureano. After defeating another of Laureano's team, La Cruz del Diablo challenged Los Dueños de la Malicia. At Juicio Final, Laureano made an appearance and attacked Los Dueños de la Malicia. In June, Laureano wrestled a returning Figueroa at a PRWA show.

=== Counselor of La Familia ===
On July 5, 2008, WWC announced that Laureano would be present in what was promoted as Colón, Sr.’s retirement. Carlos Colón’s retirement ceremony at Aniversario 2008 was attended by Abdullah, Chicky Starr, José Luis Rivera and Harley Race, with a message from Ric Flair being aired. On September 4, 2008, he was among those involved in organizing a charity card. He also served as occasional commentator. Later that month, Laureano was reintroduced at WWC as a counselor and manager in Ray González’s La Familia. On September 20, 2008, Los Renegados del Infierno defeated Thunder and Lighting with the help of Laureano, winning the World Tag Team Championship. In a rematch for the titles, Laureano interfered and allowed Los Renegados del Infierno to retain. While González took a sabbatical for personal reasons, he served as the spokesman of La Familia. After being accidentally hit, Laureano left Los Renegados del Infierno corner, allowing Thunder and Lightning to win the titles. Afterwards, González placed him in charge of Charles Evans’ career. On November 22, 2008, the Commission denied to reinstall Álvarez, who then turned on González and was joined by Laureano and the rest of La Familia. BJ then defeated Laureano, being attacked afterwards. At Lockout, Evans turned on Laureano following a loss. At Euphoria, Laureano was disqualified after violently attacking Evans. Laureano then helped González defeat Evans. BJ then defeated Evans with the distraction of Laureano. Corino then defeated González to win the Universal Heavyweight Championship in a match where Laureano initially served as special referee and was attacked. González and Laureano then defeated Corino and Mr. Mac, after which La Pesadilla intervened. After reports claimed that Laureano was leaving for PRWA, WWC clarified that this was inaccurate. Castillo, Estrada and Mr. Mac then defeated Thunder, Lightning and Laureano, after hitting the latter with a title belt. Thunder and Lightning then teamed with Laureano to defeat Castillo, Estrada and Mr. Mac. Laureano then defeated Mac in a hair vs. hair match. González and Laureano then lost a tag team match to Álvarez and Corino, who used brass knuckles. Laureano was then attacked by Idol Stevens. Laureano then lost a match to Mr. Mac after being hit with brass knuckles. At Camino a la Gloria, Laureano defeated Mac in a lumberjack match. Mac then won a match by accident. He won a rematch by disqualification. At Honor vs. Traición Laureano defeated Mac, forcing him to wear a dress. Laureano, BJ and Lightning then defeated Corino, Mac and Stevens. Prior to Aniversario, Gorbea complained that he did not even have a match for the event and challenged Laureano, only to be confronted by Reyes, Mulero, Styles, Angel and Díaz. Laureano accepted the challenge on the condition that it was an extreme rules match. La Pesadilla, Mac and Idol Steven then defeated Thunder and Lightning and Laureano, after Gorbea attacked the latter. Segments were later aired where Díaz questioned Laureano's ability to perform in an X-match at his age. In the lead up to Aniversario 2009, Laureano made media appearances to promote the event. The X match at Aniversario was won by Díaz. He continued active in the promotion afterwards. In August 2009, it was announced that Laureano would host a radio segment in La Mega. He made appearances in the independent circuit.

=== Feud with Fake Chicky Starr ===
Gorbea was then involved in a storyline where he dropped his gimmick of Tommy Diablo and appropriated José Laureano's Chicky Starr persona. He no-showed Septiembre Negro's opening card. The following date, Gorbea hosted an edition of the Chicky Starr Sport Shop and attempted to convince the former Chicky Starr to forfeit, only to be attacked and then beaten by Laureano in a match where the winner would keep the name. José Chaparro then attacked Laureano after he interfered in a match on behalf of Thunder and Lightning. Laureano then defeated Chapparro, only to be attacked and covered in feathers by the American Family. Díaz and Laureano then defeated Mulero and a jobber. At Halloween Wrestling Xtravaganza, Laureano defeated Chaparro in a match where the loser would get covered in feathers. Laureano then defeated Chaparro in a bat on a pole match, despite his opponent sabotaging the pole. On January 9, 2010, it was reported that WWE had released Pain. WWC made moves to secure his return to the promotion, later announcing his return as well as Laureano's as his manager. At Euphoria 2010, Pain defeated Álvarez with the help of Laureano. In February 2010, Black Pain was unsuccessful in a bid for Orlando Colón's the Puerto Rico Heavyweight Championship when his manager was attacked. Pain then defeated King Tonga Jr. by disqualification, when the heels stole Starr's bat. Tonga Jr. defeated Pain, while Chaparro restrained Starr. Cotto defeated Black Pain by cheating, with Starr clearing the ring afterwards which Chaparro protested. At Camino a la Gloria, Starr defeated El Wizard. Laureano also made wrestling appearance for EBW. After being scheduled to appear in a match at Aniversario 2010, Laureano did not appear. He reappeared in WWC as a critic, commenting on a match between Carlito Caribbean Cool and Ricky Banderas to be held at Septiembre Negro 2010.

=== Advising Gilbert ===
At Euphoria 2011, Laureano made his return to WWC, addressing the crowd. Leading up to Aniversario, Gilbert contracted an advisor prior to his match against Huertas, who was revealed to be Chicky Starr. During the contract signing for the match between Gilbert and Invader, Starr was announced as guest referee. Gilbert defeated Mad Man Manson when Starr cheated by passing him a bat. Both met and challenged each other to a match at Aniversario. Meanwhile, he was among the wrestlers appearing in mainstream media promoting WWC. To open Aniversario, Huertas and Díaz defeated Gilbert and Laureano. The main night, Invader hit his finisher on Laureano as part of his match against Gilbert, with ended in a no contest. At Septiembre Negro 2011, Laureano helped Gilbert defeat Huertas in a lumberjack match with Carlos Colón, Estrada, José Luis Rivera, Invader #3, Sammy Rodríguez and Fidel Sierra. Huertas then challenged Laureano, leading to a hair vs. hair match. At Halloween Wrestling Xtravaganza, Chicky Starr defeated Huertas by cheating to win his hair. Gilbert became the first contender to the Universal Heavyweight Championship by defeating Shane Sewell with the help of Chicky Starr. Laureano continued celebrating, while Huertas remained silent. At Crossfire, Huertas challenged Laureano to a stipulation match. Castillo and Laureano faced each other. To open Lockout, Castillo defeated Laureano by disqualification. The following night, Huertas defeated Laureano in the stipulation match. During the offseason, he wrestled for IWL. At Euphoria, Huertas defeated Laureano. The following night, Castillo defeated Laureano. At La Hora de la Verdad, Laureano defeated AJ Castillo. Los Fujitivos defeated Mr. Big and Chicky Starr. At Noche de Campeones, Gilbert turned on Laureano and attacked him along Orlando Toledo and others. At Camino a la Gloria, Huertas was attacked by Orlando Toledo and his Nuevo Mando, with Laureano trying to make the save. He appeared in Junte para la Historia, a charity card which included talent from several promotions. Laureano began teasing the reformation of the Starr Corporation. Los Fujitivos were briefly managed by Chicky Starr, who was involved in a trend where he sabotaged all of Toledo's moves. A match between him and Toledo was built up. The main night of the event, the New Starr Corporation defeated Nuevo Mando. To close Aniversario 2012, Toledo cheated to defeat Laureano. The feud between the New Starr Corporation and Nuevo Mando continued being featured in the television programming. Laureano returned to the ring and joined The Patriot to defeat Toledo and a jobber in a tag team match. Chicky Starr began managing Chris Angel in a feud with Universal Heavyweight Champion Andy Levine, who got an early advantage. At PRWA, Castillo and Chicky Starr clashed. Their feud concluded without a winner, as both joined forces.

=== Independent tour, managing ===
In the launch show of the Action Wrestling Association (AWA), a retro-style promotion, Laureano defeated Rico Suave, but was betrayed and formed an alliance with Castillo. His involvement in this promotion had been hyped during an appearance in IGWA. When PRWA debuted a foul-mouthed parody named “Kiki Starr”, complete with his own “Sports Shop”, Laureano responded by calling it inaccurate and “degrading to professional wrestling”. To close the year, Chicky Starr won the IGWA World Heavyweight Championship. He made his return to WWC in a homage to Carlos Colón, later making his in-ring return by replacing Carlito at Camino a la Gloria. At Camino a la Gloria Thunder and Lightning defeated Chicky Starr and Miguel Pérez. Laureano was involved in a feud with José Chaparro, who brought wrestlers to face him. Cotto defeated Ursus with the help of Laureano. Ursus defeated Laureano, as Chaparro's representative. In the in-ring debut of the character, The Alien defeated Laureano. Laureano joined Miguel Pérez in an attempt to dethrone Los Templarios of the World Tag Team Championship. At Summer Madness, Chaparro defeated Laureano with the help of Juan Manúel Ortega. In singles, Laureano defeated Chaparro by using a bat. He participated in a series of charity events. He participated in the Carlos Colón Cup won by Mighty Ursus. He faced Juan Manúel Ortega in a Lights Out Match. WWC dedicated Aniversario to Laureano. Parallel to this, Laureano continued involved in the titular scene at IGWA. At WWC, Castillo attacked Laureano after being questioned about betraying Miguel Pérez. Los Templarios defeated Laureano and Xavant. At Aniversario 41 he received a homage, which concluded with Jerry Lawler issuing a challenge. Laureano backed Xavant when facing Ursus. The match with Lawler was programmed for Euphoria, but fell through. At Euphoria 2015 Xavant and Laureano defeated Los Templarios. Laureano faced Juan Manúel Ortega in singles. Laureano helped Ursus defeat Álvarez. While he was pursuing the Puerto Rico Heavyweight Championship, WWC ran a backstage angle where Ortega wanted him to return as a client. In the end, Ursus turned on Laureano allowing Ortega to win and change sides. He continued appearing in charity cards. At Summer Madness, Fashion and El Diabólico defeated Laureano and Xavant, winning two minutes with the losers handcuffed. To close the tour, Laureano wrestled El Diabólico. At indy show Noche de Grandes, Laureano and Rivera wrestled to a no contest, before joining to win in a tag team match. In WWC, Xavant and Laureano defeated Los Espantos. At El Gran Conflicto, La Revolución jumped Laureano prior to a scheduled match against Orlando Toledo. He continued appearing in charity cards. To open Aniversario, La Revolución joined Toledo in a loss to Sons of Samoa and Laureano. Abroad, he appeared in New Jersey for Game Changer. Laureano brought Black Pain back to WWC to attack Ursus. He participated in a charity card. At CWA's Víctor “The Bodyguard” Rodríguez Cup, Laureano was homaged for his work as part of the Starr Corporation. They clashed in a rematch. He continued appearing in charity events. Laureano and El Explosivo vs. Criminal de Guerra and Latin Freebird. At El Profe: Una lucha Mas, Laureano and El Profe defeated Los Wizards. At El Profe: Una lucha mas; La Revancha, Profe, Laureano and Pulgarcito faced The Mighty Ursus and Los Wizards. In 2017, Laureano began a campaign to goad Huertas into one last match, beating a stand-in. He participated in an independent show held at a hacienda. In his return to WWC, Laureano was introduced as an honorary member of El Sindicato. While Puerto Rico was recovering from Maria, Laureano made an appearance at New Generation Championship Wrestling among other veterans from Puerto Rico. When a charity card was held for wrestling personality Gustavo Rodríguez, he participated in the card. At Lucha Conquest III, Hugo Savinovich gave plaques to Laureano and Barrabás.

=== General Manager of IWA-PR ===
At Impacto Total: El Tour Savio Vega and Shane defeated Ferno and JC Navarro in a lumberjack match with the Starr Corporation surrounding the ring. Huertas appeared at NGCW, as a guest referee in a match where Noriega managed by Laureano won the International Championship. His return to the ring also took place in that event, where he joined Boricua Guerrero to face GM Savio Vega and Noriega. Ferno revealed that Savio Vega, Shane Sewell and Tones each owned 25% of IWA, with Miguel Pérez giving up his share to Slash Venom. Laureano reappeared in the promotion as a representative for Venom. Backstage, Laureano brokered a meeting between Venom and Ferno. After Manny Ferno defeated Savio Vega at Golpe de Estado, the GM, Legio and La Revolución attacked Puro Macho, Thunder and Lightning, with Venom and Laureano making the save. He was given an on screen authority role, managing cards to his whim. At Hardcore Weekend, Laureano faced Tonos in a face slapping contest. At Histeria Boricua, he was tasked with delivering a “special message”. Savio Vega and Electro vs. Ferno and The Mighty Ursus with Laureano and Huertas as guest referees headlined Histeria Boricua 2022.

=== El Nuevo Orden, headlining Aniversario 2023 (2022-present) ===
In August 2022, he participated in organizing a fund raiser for Genesis Bulerin, long-time IWA Women's Champion. At Euphoria 2023, Starr managed Fandango in an unsuccessful challenge for the Universal Heavyweight Championship against Intelecto 5 Estrellas. This trend continued at La Hora de la Verdad 2023, when he managed Cezar Bononi, who also felt short. Starr was then involved in a feud against local urban music influencer Jonathann Rosario, known as Gallo The Producer, carrying a contract for a match. When a match for Aniversario was being signed between both, El Nuevo Orden turned on Starr. Afterwards, he recruited Ricky Banderas to wrestle Xavant, but he failed to appear in Aniversario due to injury. He formed an alliance with Gilbert. In the main event of Aniversario 50, Starr defeated Rosario.

== Legacy ==
=== In wrestling ===
Laureano is considered the best heel in Puerto Rico, the most successful villainous character to cross over into the main stream and generally among the top wrestlers in local history. Several wrestlers have adopted the moniker “Chickystarriano” as part of their character, in homage of Laureano. Los Chickystarrianos, first known as Legión Chickystariana and later as la Religión Chickystarriana, organized during the 1990s and were the first wrestling fan club in Puerto Rico and their presence has been ubiquitous wherever he performs for decades. Laureano has often recognized them publicly and refers to the group as “pioneers” and his “children”. The group was created by several alumni of the University of Puerto Rico at Mayagüez and at its height had members in countries such as Brazil, Iraq, Argentina and Afghanistan.

=== In popular culture ===
The phrase “estás bregando Chicky Estar…”, first coined by WWC color commentator Joaquín Padín following Laureano's first heel turn, gained traction among the general population. The idiom became synonymous with betrayal, treason, untrustworthiness and cheating. The phrase has remained relevant for more than 40 years and morphed into memes with the advent of the internet era.

== Personal life ==
=== Early life and education ===
When he was a child, his nickname was “Chiquitín”, which later evolved into “Chicky”. In 1982, he incorporated this into his ring name, feeling that his real name was not interesting, and added a variant of the word “star” to differentiate it. In college, Laureano earned an associate degree in criminal justice and also studied pharmacy.

=== Relationships ===
Laureano has been married to Julia Candelas and Leslie Santiago (m. 2018), he is the father of several children, with the eldest being Joseph. His other sons are Alexander Alí and José Laureano Jr., who is also known by the nickname “Chiqui”, and has served as the president of the Puerto Rico Amateur Boxing Federation and of the American Boxing Conferation.

Following the end of his marriage with Candelas, the couple's intimate life became the topic of media coverage in gossip shows due to several contentious events. Laureano had two daughters out of wedlock during this relationship. Laureano and Candelas had a short-lived reunion in 2015. That same year Laureano was briefly jailed due to a child support debt as part of a widely publicized clash with Candelas. He was released after paying $4,000 and publicly thanked the Ñetas for their treatment.

He and Rodríguez were friends outside the business, with the two hosting family reunions and playing different sports and games such as pool or dominos, since both lived in Levittown at that time. Laureano worked for Capitol Security, property of friend Miguel Portilla where Rodríguez worked as director of security. During the early 2000s, he joined Ranger American of Puerto Rico, where he served as Operation Manager. When Hurricane Marilyn struck St. Thomas, Laureano and Rodríguez worked as field security agents for the Federal Emergency Management Agency (FEMA). Both were contracted to work in a number of public events, notably strikes, which took them abroad on occasion. Rodríguez and his wife Kelly were the godparents of Laureano's younger daughter, Paloma.

=== Political affiliations ===
In April 2010, Laureano announced that he would run for a spot in the Puerto Rico House of Representatives for the New Progressive Party (PNP), which was covered by mainstream outlets such as El Nuevo Día and Primera Hora. Wrestling fans were polled, with the majority believing that he could be elected.

=== Health issues ===
In 2016, he collapsed and was hospitalized. These issues continued in 2018.

=== Other ===
Starr's oldest son is Puerto Rican boxer José Laureano who won a silver medal at the 1993 Central American and Caribbean Games. Starr owns his own brand of coquito that he sells during Christmas called "Coquito Chickystariano". Laureano is a critic of the "sports entertainment" formula now prevalent in the business, predominantly in WWE.

== Championships and accomplishments ==
- Champion Wrestling Association
  - CWA Heavyweight Championship (1 time)
- International Wrestling Association
  - IWA Hardcore Championship (1 time)
  - IWA World Tag Team Championship (6 times) – with Victor the Bodyguard
- Pro Wrestling Illustrated
  - PWI ranked him #245 of the top 500 singles wrestlers in the PWI 500 in 1998
- Southwest Championship Wrestling
  - SCW Southwest Tag Team Championship (1 time) – with Brett Sawyer
  - SCW Southwest Junior Heavyweight Championship (2 times)
- Top Heavyweight Wrestling Promotions
  - THWP Caribbean Tag Team Championship (1 time) – with Ángelo Rivera
- World Wrestling Council
  - WWC Universal Heavyweight Championship (1 time)
  - WWC Junior Heavyweight Championship (3 times)
  - WWC Television Championship (1 time)
  - WWC World Tag Team Championship (7 times) – with Ron Starr (2), Victor the Bodyguard (1), Huracán Castillo (3) and Alex Montalvo (1)
  - WWC Caribbean Tag Team Championship (1 time) – with Leo Burke
  - WWC North American Tag Team Championship (3 times) – with Ron Starr
- American World Promotions
  - AWP Caribbean Tag Team Championship (1 time) - with Hercules Ayala

== Luchas de Apuestas record ==
Winner (wager)	Loser (wager)	Location	Event	Date	Notes
Invader 1 (career)	Chicky Starr (hair)	Bayamón, Puerto Rico	WWC Aniversario 87	September 20, 1987	
Chicky Starr (hair)	Invader 1 (hair)	Bayamón, Puerto Rico	WWC Aniversario 2011	July 17, 2011	

== See also ==
- Professional wrestling in Puerto Rico
