= Ron Starr =

American professional wrestler (1951–2017)

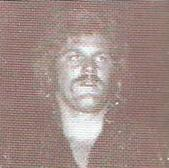
- Starr in 1977

Personal information
- Born: Bobby Eugene Nutt; April 3, 1951 Atlanta, Georgia, U.S.
- Died: June 8, 2017 (aged 66)
- Cause of death: Collapsed lung

Professional wrestling career
- Ring name(s): Bobby Starr; Mr. Wrestling; Ron Starr; Spoiler #2
- Billed height: 5 ft 11 in (180 cm)
- Billed weight: 240 lb (109 kg)
- Trained by: Buddy Colt; Al Velasco
- Debut: 1972
- Retired: 1997

Bobby Eugene Nutt (April 3, 1951 – June 8, 2017), better known by his ring name Ron Starr, was an American professional wrestler. Starr was a mainstay for numerous wrestling territories throughout the 1970s and 80s, capturing almost three dozen championships throughout his career including two reigns as NWA World Junior Heavyweight Champion and several reigns as NWA World Tag Team Champion. He was also notable for his involvement with Stampede Wrestling in Canada and his tenure with the World Wrestling Council (WWC) in Puerto Rico. Starr has been called "one of the unsung heroes of the territory days of professional wrestling" and "one of the most effective heels that territorial professional wrestling had ever seen.

== Early life ==
Bobby Nutt was born to parents Oscar and Betty Nutt. His love of professional wrestling came from his mother, who was a wrestling fan and would attend shows on Friday nights. In 1970 at the age of 18, Bobby enlisted in the United States Army, serving eighteen months in Vietnam. Nutt had difficulty becoming re-accustomed to American life but soon found work in the construction industry where he worked alongside his father. He was noticed at a local YMCA gym by wrestlers Buddy Colt and Billy Spears, who introduced him to the possibility of a career in professional wrestling.

== Professional wrestling career ==
Starr debuted in 1972 and soon made a name for himself working for Jim Crockett Promotions in the National Wrestling Alliance, primarily in the Mid-Atlantic and Championship Wrestling From Florida territories. He traveled extensively throughout his career, making his New Japan Pro-Wrestling debut in 1976 and accumulating championships in various territories throughout the Gulf Coast, Central States, San Francisco, Pacific Northwest, British Columbia, Los Angeles, Tri-States Stampede, Atlantic Grand Prix and Puerto Rico. During his tenures in Japan, China and South Africa, he primarily wrestled under the ring name "Ron Starr."

Throughout the 1970s and 80s, Starr was a prolific traveler throughout the territory system. He captured singles and tag team championships in Central States, Gulf Coast, Pacific Northwest, Texas and Southeastern territories and won several NWA world championships, including two reigns as NWA World Junior Heavyweight champion, beating Pat Barrett in 1976, and then Les Thornton in a tournament in 1980.

Starr had perhaps one of his best-remembered runs during his tenure with Stampede Wrestling in Calgary, where he was a two-time Stampede Tag Team Championship as one-half of the “Memphis Mafia” tag team alongside Wayne Farris (aka the Honky Tonk Man).

Having wrestled several tours for New Japan between 1976 and 1980, Starr spent the later part of the wrestling career from 1987 wrestling overseas for New Japan and the World Wrestling Council in Puerto Rico until 1997. In the WWC, he captured 12 titles, including being a two-time Junior Heavyweight Champion, four-time World Tag Team Champion, three-time North American Tag Team Champion and two-time Television Champion.

In 1997, Starr retired from wrestling.

Ron Starr Autographed Publicity Photo

Ron Starr Autograph

== Later life and death ==
In his later life, Starr published his autobiography, titled "Bad to the Bone: 25 Years of Riots and Wrestling". The book was reviewed by Marty Goldstein of SLAM! Sports, who called it "an essential volume for any true fan of the business" due to its concise detailing of the territory system. The book was foreworded by Mick Foley, who credits Starr with teaching him the art of "brawling" in wrestling, during their 1989 feud.

According to Rock Rims (who worked with Starr on his autobiography) Starr had suffered four heart attacks and four strokes in the last two decades of his life. He lived with his sister in Opp, Alabama and was married in 1986. Starr died on June 8, 2017, and was found by his wife that morning at 6:20 am, having died in his sleep, reportedly of a collapsed lung.

== Championships and accomplishments ==
- All-South Wrestling Alliance
  - ASWA Georgia Tag Team Championship (1 time) - with Randy Rose
- Atlantic Grand Prix Wrestling
  - AGPW International Heavyweight Championship (3 times)
- NWA Hollywood Wrestling
  - NWA Americas Heavyweight Championship (1 time)
- National Wrestling Alliance
  - NWA World Junior Heavyweight Championship (2 times)
  - NWA Central States Heavyweight Championship (1 time)
  - NWA Central States Tag Team Championship (1 time) - with Tom Andrews
  - NWA World Tag Team Championship (San Francisco version) (2 times) - with Dean Ho (1) and Enrique Vera (1)
  - NWA World Tag Team Championship (Los Angeles version) (1 time) - with The Hood
  - NWA United States Heavyweight Championship (San Francisco version) (3 times)
  - NWA Gulf Coast Tag Team Championship (1 time) - with Terry Lathan
  - NWA Pacific Northwest Tag Team Championship (1 time) - with Adrian Adonis
  - NWA Southeastern Tag Team Championship (Northern Division) (1 time) - with Wayne Ferris
  - NWA World Tag Team Championship (Central States Version) (1 time) - with Black Angus
- Stampede Wrestling
  - Stampede International Tag Team Championship (2 times) - with Wayne Ferris)
  - Stampede British Commonwealth Mid-Heavyweight Championship (1 time)
- World Wrestling Council
  - WWC World Junior Heavyweight Championship (2 times)
  - WWC World Tag Team Championship (4 times) - with Chicky Starr (2), Cuban Assassin (1) and Doug Masters (1)
  - WWC North American Tag Team Championship (3 times) - with Chicky Starr
  - WWC Television Championship (2 times)
  - WWC Caribbean Tag Team Championship (1 time) - with Cuban Assassin
- United States Wrestling Association
  - USWA Tag Team Championship (1 time) - with Sheik Braddock
- WSA
  - WSA Tag Team Championship (3 times) - with Johnny Mantell, Steve Bolus, and Moondog Moretti
- World Wrestling Organization
  - WWO Tag Team Championship (1 time) – with Hardcore Holly
- Other titles:
  - California Heavyweight Championship ( 1 time )

=== Luchas de Apuestas record ===
Winner (wager)	Loser (wager)	Location	Event	Date	Notes
Bob Sweetan	Ron Starr, as Mr. Wrestling (mask)	Kansas City, Kansas	Heart of America Sports Attractions	September 22, 1977	
