= WWC World Tag Team Championship =

Professional wrestling tag team championship

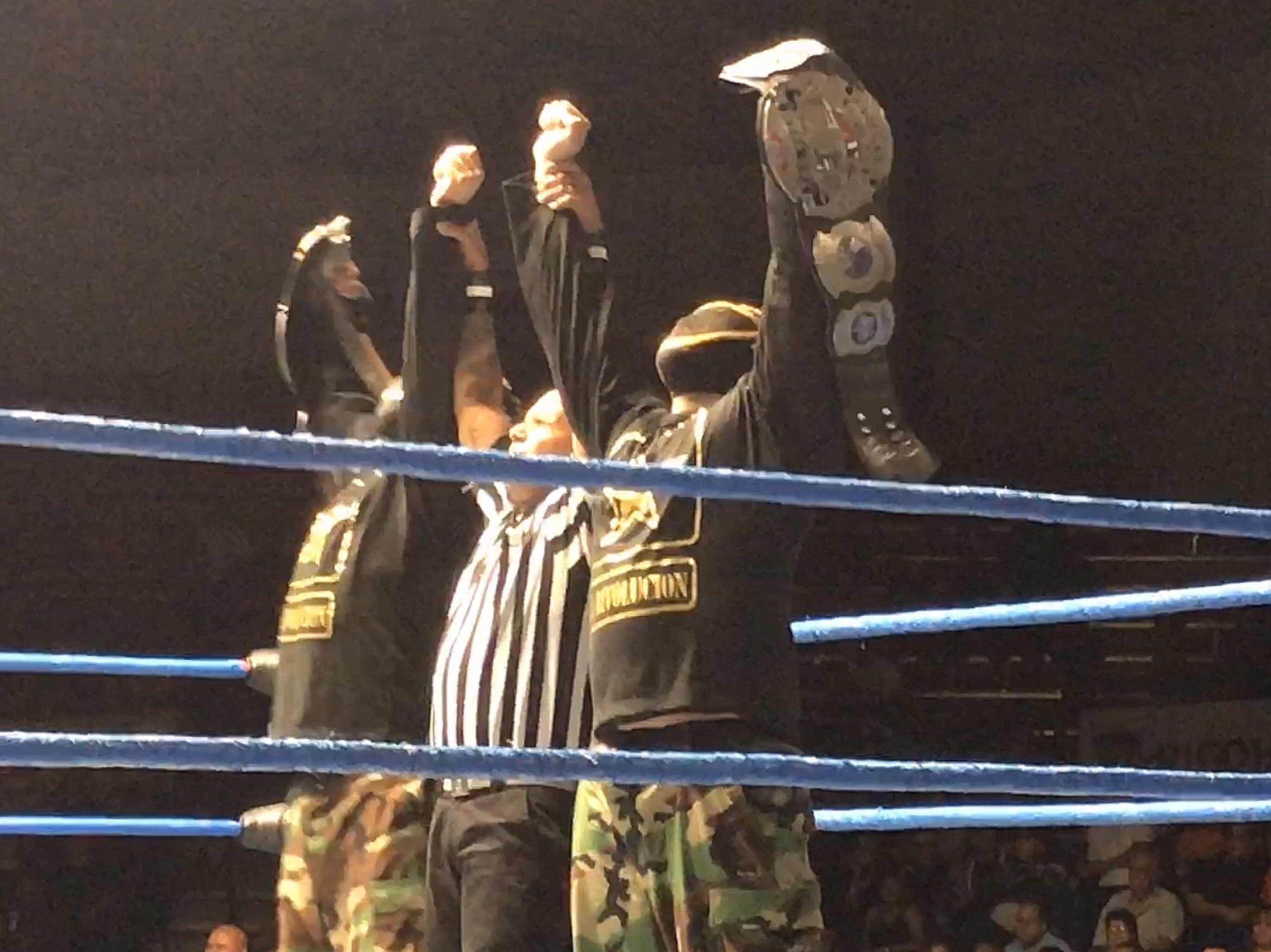
- La Revolución as champions in 2018.

Details
- Promotion: World Wrestling Council (WWC)
- Date established: February 26, 1977
- Current champion: Los Inmortales
- Date won: October 24, 2026
Statistics
- First champion: The Fabulous Kangaroos
- Most reigns: As a tag team: La Artillería Pesada Thunder & Lightning (29 reigns) As a individual Lightning (32 reigns)
- Longest reign: The Funk Brothers (860 days)
- Shortest reign: Thunder and Lightning (1 day)
- Youngest champion: Ray González Jr. (17 years)

The WWC World Tag Team Championship is the tag team title contested for in the Puerto Rican professional wrestling promotion, the World Wrestling Council.

== History ==
=== Abroad (2017) ===
On February 11, 2017, Thunder and Lightning defended the WWC World Tag Team Championship against Stateline (Damien Angel and Eddie Taurus) in Lorain, Ohio, this as part of Cleveland Knights Championship Wrestling's Chase for the Grail event.

=== Local independent circuit (2018) ===
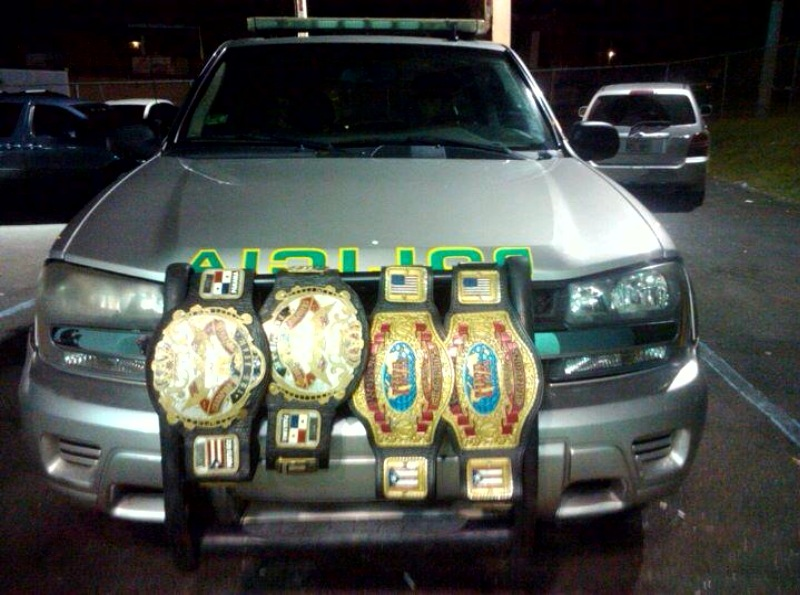
The (unofficial) Unified Puerto Rico Tag Team Championship as held by Dennis Rivera and Noel Rodríguez; the discontinued model of the WWC World Tag Team Championship belts (left) and IWA World Tag Team Championship belts (right).

With WWC immersed in a hiatus following the passing of Hurricane Maria in September 2017, restricted licenses were granted to the talents in order to stay active. A direct consequence was that on January 6, 2018, the titles were defended for the first time in the Puerto Rican independent circuit. At CWA's Guerra de Reyes, incumbent champions La Revolución retained over the teams of La Familia Cubana, La Potencia and Akiles Falcón and Blackstone in a four-way match. On January 27, 2018, the champions made another appearance in the independent promotion when one of its members, El Comandante, faced Alejandro Marrero of Los Fujitivos. On February 24, 2018, four champion teams -La Revolución presenting WWC, Westside Mafia representing WWL, Los Fujitivos representing CWA and Smoke and Nightmare representing CWS- competed in a match where the team pinned would drop their titles to the winners. La Revolución was not involved in the result, which saw the CWA titlists best their CWS counterparts.

== Title history ==
Key
No.	Overall reign number
Reign	Reign number for the specific team—reign numbers for the individuals are in parentheses, if different
Days	Number of days held
†	Championship change is unrecognized by the promotion
<1	Reign lasted less than a day
+	Current reign is changing daily

No.	Champion	Championship change			Reign statistics		Notes	Ref.
No.	Champion	Date	Event	Location	Reign	Days	Notes	Ref.
1	The Fabulous Kangaroos (Al Costello and Don Kent)	February 26, 1977	House show	N/A	1	14	Billed as the inaugural champions.	
2	Los Dinámicos (Carlos Colón and José Rivera)	March 12, 1977	House show	Caguas, Puerto Rico	1	231		
3	The Samoans (Afa and Sika)	October 29, 1977	House show	Caguas, Puerto Rico	1	49		
4	Invader I and José Rivera (2)	December 17, 1977	House show	San Juan, Puerto Rico	1	28		
—	Vacated	January 14, 1978	—	—	—	—	Titles vacated after a controversial ending in a match against Al Costello and Don Kent.	
5	Invader I (2) and José Rivera (3)	February 4, 1978	House show	San Juan, Puerto Rico	2	91	Defeated Al Costello and Don Kent in a rematch to win the vacant titles.	
6	Huracán Castillo and Pierre Martel	May 6, 1978	House show	Bayamón, Puerto Rico	1	21		
7	Invader I (3) and José Rivera (4)	May 27, 1978	House show	Bayamón, Puerto Rico	3	149		
8	Kengo Kimura and Hiro Sasaki	October 23, 1978	House show	Caguas, Puerto Rico	1	19		
9	The Invaders (Invader I (4) and Invader II)	November 11, 1978	House show	Caguas, Puerto Rico	1	146		
10	The Funk Brothers (Terry Funk and Dory Funk, Jr.)	April 6, 1979	House show	San Juan, Puerto Rico	1	232		
11	The Invaders (Invader I (5) and Invader II (2))	November 24, 1979	House show	Bayamón, Puerto Rico	2	28		
12	The Funk Brothers (Terry Funk and Dory Funk, Jr.)	December 22, 1979	House Show	Bayamón, Puerto Rico	2	861		
13	The Fabulous Kangaroos (Al Costello and Don Kent)	May 1, 1982	House Show	San Juan, Puerto Rico	2	55		
14	Invader I (6) and Pierre Martel (2)	June 26, 1982	House Show	San Juan, Puerto Rico	1	29		
15	The Moondogs (Moondog Rex and Moondog Spot)	July 24, 1982	House show	San Juan, Puerto Rico	1	84		
16	Gino de la Serra and Pierre Martel (3)	October 16, 1982	House show	San Juan, Puerto Rico	1	35		
17	Los Mercenarios (Cuban Assassin and Jerry Morrow)	November 20, 1982	House show	Bayamón, Puerto Rico	1	64		
18	Gran Apolo and Pierre Martel (4)	January 23, 1983	House show	Ponce, Puerto Rico	1	20		
19	Scorpio and Mr. Tempest	February 12, 1983	House show	Bayamón, Puerto Rico	1	30		
—	Vacated	March 14, 1983	—	—	—	—	The titles were vacated after Scorpio left the promotion.	
20	Carlos Colón (2) and Pedro Morales	April 30, 1983	House show	San Juan, Puerto Rico	1	133	Defeated Medic I and Medic II to win the vacant titles.	
21	The Medics/The Super Médicos (Medic I and Medic II)	September 10, 1983	House show	Morovis, Puerto Rico	1	118	The team was also known as The Medics.	
22	Hercules Ayala and King Tonga	January 6, 1984	House show	Morovis, Puerto Rico	1	22		
23	The Super Médicos (Medic I (2) and Medic II (2))	January 28, 1984	House show	Guaynabo, Puerto Rico	2	88		
24	The Invaders (Invader I (7) and Invader III)	April 25, 1984	House show	San Juan, Puerto Rico	1	101		
25	The Super Médicos (Medic I (3) and Medic III)	August 4, 1984	House show	San Juan, Puerto Rico	1	65		
—	Vacated	October 8, 1984	—	—	—	—	The titles were vacated after Medic III lost his mask in a title defense.	
26	The Invaders (Invader I (8) and Invader III (2)	November 22, 1984	House show	Bayamón, Puerto Rico	2	16	Defeated Black Gordman and Medic I to win the vacant titles.	
27	Black Gordman and Medic I (4)	December 8, 1984	House show	Guaynabo, Puerto Rico	1	29		
28	The New York Rockers (Al Perez and Joe Savoldi)	January 6, 1985	House show	San Juan, Puerto Rico	1	76		
—	Vacated	March 23, 1985	—	—	—	—		
29	Ángel Mexicano and Fidel Sierra	April 6, 1985	House show	San Juan, Puerto Rico	1	<1		
—	Vacated	April 6, 1985	—	—	—	—	The titles were vacated after Ángel Mexicano left the promotion.	
30	The Rock 'n' Roll RPMs (Mike Davis and Tommy Lane)	June 29, 1985	House show	San Juan, Puerto Rico	1	400	Defeated Eric Embry and The Crusher in a tournament final to win the vacant titles.	
31	Los Pastores (Butch Miller and Luke Williams)	August 3, 1986	House show	Bayamón, Puerto Rico	1	49		
32	The Rock 'n' Roll RPMs (Mike Davis and Tommy Lane)	September 21, 1986	WWC 13th Aniversario 1986 - Night 3	San Juan, Puerto Rico	2	13		
33	The Starr Cousins (Chicky and Ron Starr)	October 4, 1986	House show	Caguas, Puerto Rico	1	94		
34	The Youngbloods (Chris Youngblood and Mark Youngblood)	January 6, 1987	House show	San Juan, Puerto Rico	1	88		
35	Los Pastores (Butch Miller and Luke Williams)	April 4, 1987	House show	Caguas, Puerto Rico	2	36		
36	The Youngbloods (Chris Youngblood and Mark Youngblood)	May 10, 1987	House show	San Juan, Puerto Rico	2	62		
37	Mr. Pogo and TNT	July 11, 1987	House show	Caguas, Puerto Rico	1	19		
38	The Youngbloods (Chris Youngblood and Mark Youngblood)	July 30, 1987	House show	San Juan, Puerto Rico	3	27		
39	The Hunters (Bob Brown and Dale Veasey)	August 26, 1987	House show	Port of Spain, Trinidad and Tobago	1	25	This was the first time the titles changed hands outside of Puerto Rico.	
40	The Youngbloods (Chris Youngblood and Mark Youngblood)	September 20, 1987	WWC 14th Aniversario 1987	Ponce, Puerto Rico	4	27		
41	Kendo Nagasaki and Mr. Pogo (2)	October 17, 1987	House show	Caguas, Puerto Rico	1	81		
42	The Invaders (Invader I (9) and Invader III (3)	January 6, 1988	House show	San Juan, Puerto Rico	3	10		
43	Kendo Nagasaki (2) and Mr. Pogo (3)	January 16, 1988	House show	Guaynabo, Puerto Rico	2	63		
—	Vacated	March 19, 1988	House show	Caguas, Puerto Rico	—	—	The titles were vacated after a controversial ending of the match between Kendo Nagasaki and Mr. Pogo against Chris Youngblood and Mark Youngblood.	
44	Kendo Nagasaki (3) and Mr. Pogo (4)	April 12, 1988	House show	San Juan, Puerto Rico	3	32	Defeated Chris Youngblood and Mark Youngblood in a rematch.	
45	The Youngbloods (Chris Youngblood and Mark Youngblood)	May 14, 1988	House show	Caguas, Puerto Rico	5	70	Also defeated Mr. Pogo and Kendo Nagasaki on April 23, 1988 in Guaynabo, Puerto Rico.	
46	Kendo Nagasaki (4) and Mr. Pogo (5)	July 23, 1988	House show	Arecibo, Puerto Rico	4	14	The reason of this title change was due to The Youngbloods requesting their release after the murder of Bruiser Brody.	
47	The Batten Twins (Bart Batten and Brad Batten)	August 6, 1988	House show	San Juan, Puerto Rico	1	71		
48	The Starr Cousins (Chicky and Ron Starr)	October 16, 1988	House show	Aquadilla, Puerto Rico	2	27		
49	The Batten Twins (Bart Batten and Brad Batten)	November 12, 1988	House show	Caguas, Puerto Rico	2	55		
50	Dan Kroffat and Tama	January 6, 1989	House show	San Juan, Puerto Rico	1	57		
51	The Batten Twins (Bart Batten and Brad Batten)	March 4, 1989	House show	Bayamón, Puerto Rico	3	7		
52	Jason the Terrible and Steve Strong	March 11, 1989	House show	Caguas, Puerto Rico	1	27		
53	Carlos Colón (3) and Invader I (10)	April 7, 1989	House show	Juncos, Puerto Rico	1	40	Won by forfeit after Jason the Terrible suffered a legitimate knee injury.	
54	Abudda Dein and Rip Rogers	May 17, 1989	House show	Vega Alta, Puerto Rico	1	60		
55	Puerto Rican Express (Huracán Castillo, Jr. and Miguel Pérez, Jr.)	July 16, 1989	House show	Mayagüez, Puerto Rico	1	20		
56	Abudda Dein and Rip Rogers	August 5, 1989	House show	Juncos, Puerto Rico	2	63		
57	The Youngbloods (Chris Youngblood and Mark Youngblood)	October 7, 1989	WWC 16th Aniversario 1989	Bayamón, Puerto Rico	6	120		
58	Los Mercenarios (Cuban Assassin (2) and Ron Starr (3))	February 4, 1990	House show	Aguadilla, Puerto Rico	1	55		
59	The Super Médicos (Super Medic I (5) and Super Medic III (2))	March 31, 1990	House show	Caguas, Puerto Rico	2	126		
60	The Continental Dream (Lance Idol and Rick Valentine)	August 4, 1990	House show	Caguas, Puerto Rico	1	42		
61	The Super Médicos (Super Medic I (6) and Super Medic III (3))	September 15, 1990	House show	Bayamón, Puerto Rico	3	<1		
—	Vacated	September 15, 1990	House show	Caguas, Puerto Rico	—	—	The titles were vacated after a controversial ending of a match of Super Medic I and Super Medic III against Killer and Psycho.	
62	The Super Médicos (Super Medic I (7) and Super Medic III (4))	September 22, 1990	House show	Caguas, Puerto Rico	4	7	Defeated Killer and Psycho in a rematch to win the vacant titles.	
63	The Texas Hangmen (Killer and Psycho)	September 29, 1990	House show	Carolina, Puerto Rico	1	127		
64	El Bronco and Invader I (11)	February 3, 1991	House show	Bayamón, Puerto Rico	1	7		
65	The Texas Hangmen (Killer and Psycho)	February 10, 1991	House show	Hormigueros, Puerto Rico	2	20		
66	El Bronco (2) and Invader I (12)	March 2, 1991	House show	Bayamón, Puerto Rico	2	132	This was a Mask vs. Hair match.	
67	Puerto Rican Express (Huracán Castillo, Jr. and Miguel Pérez, Jr.)	July 13, 1991	House show	Carolina, Puerto Rico	2	7		
68	El Bronco (3) and Invader I (13)	July 20, 1991	House show	Carolina, Puerto Rico	3	138	Titles awarded by the commission due to a controversy during title match against Huracán Castillo, Jr. and Miguel Pérez, Jr.	
69	The Heartbreakers (Heartbreaker Apollo and Heartbreaker Adonis)	November 29, 1991	House show	Willemstad, Curaçao	1	26	Formerly known as Frankie Lancaster and Wendell Cooley.	
70	Rex King and Ricky Santana	December 21, 1991	House show	San Juan, Puerto Rico	1	10		
71	The Heartbreakers (Heartbreaker Apollo and Heartbreaker Adonis)	January 4, 1992	House show	San Juan, Puerto Rico	2	54		
72	Rex King (2) and Ricky Santana (2)	February 1, 1992	House show	Guaynabo, Puerto Rico	2	48		
73	The Heartbreakers (Heartbreaker Apollo and Heartbreaker Adonis)	March 1, 1992	House show	Mayagüez, Puerto Rico	3	14		
74	Heartbreaker Adonis (4) and Doug Masters	March 15, 1992	House show	N/A	1	5	Heartbreaker Adonis left the promotion, with Masters taking his place. This reign is not considered a continuation of the previous one due to Apollo getting a new tag team partner.	
75	El Bronco (4) and Ciclón Salvadoreño	March 21, 1992	House show	Humacao, Puerto Rico	1	21		
76	Doug Masters (2) and Ron Starr (4)	April 11, 1992	House show	Caguas, Puerto Rico	1	35		
—	Vacated	May 16, 1992	House show	—	—	—	The titles were vacated after a controversial ending of a match Doug Masters and Ron Starr against Rex King and Ricky Santana.	
77	Doug Masters (3) and Ron Starr (5)	May 24, 1992	House show	San Germán, Puerto Rico	2	31	Won a rematch against Rex King and Ricky Santana by forfeit due to Santana not appearing. This was for the vacant titles.	
78	The Southern Rockers (Steve Doll and Rex King (3))	June 24, 1992	House show	Dorado, Puerto Rico	1	38		
—	Vacated	August 1, 1992	House show	—	—	—	Titles were vacated after a controversial ending of the match. Ray González replaced Steve Doll while defending the championships against Solid Gold (24k and 14k).	
79	Ray González and Rex King (4)	September 19, 1992	House show	Carolina, Puerto Rico	1	97	Defeated Solid Gold (24k and 14k) in a rematch to win the vacant titles.	
80	Mohammed Hussein and El Vigilante (4)	December 20, 1992	House show	Bayamón, Puerto Rico	1	56	El Vigilante formerly known as José Estrada, Jr. or 18k.	
81	Los Originales Nenes de las Nenas (Ray González (2) and Ricky Santana (3))	February 14, 1993	House show	Cayey, Puerto Rico	1	15		
82	The Outlaws (Bart Batten and Brad Batten)	February 27, 1993	House show	Caguas, Puerto Rico	4	28		
83	Los Originales Nenes de las Nenas (Ray González (3) and Ricky Santana (4))	March 27, 1993	House show	Caguas, Puerto Rico?	2	70		
84	Mohammed Hussein (2) and Don Sanders	June 5, 1993	House show	Bayamón, Puerto Rico	1	28		
85	Mohammed Hussein (3) and Dusty Wolfe	July 3, 1993	House show	Arroyo, Puerto Rico?	1	42	Dusty Wolfe replace Don Sanders.	
86	El Bronco (5) and Ray González (4)	August 14, 1993?	House show	Carolina, Puerto Rico?	1	204		
87	Huracán Castillo, Jr. (3) and Mohammed Hussein (4)	March 6, 1994	House show	Bayamón, Puerto Rico	1	90		
—	Vacated	June 4, 1994	—	—	—	—	Titles were vacated after Castillo Jr. and Hussein split up as a tag team.	
88	Mohammed Hussein (5) and The Tahitian Warrior	June 25, 1994	House show	Caguas, Puerto Rico	1	11	Defeated El Bronco and Pulgarcito to win the vacant titles.	
89	El Bronco (6) and Ray González (5)	July 6, 1994	House show	Toa Alta, Puerto Rico	2	18		
90	The Wildcats (Mike Anthony and Dobby Gillies)	July 24, 1994	House show	Mayagüez, Puerto Rico	1	6		
91	La Conexión Comunista (Mohammed Hussein (6) and Fidel Sierra (2))	July 30, 1994	House show	Toa Alta, Puerto Rico	1	13		
92	El Bronco (7) and Ray González (6)	August 12, 1994	House show	Manati, Puerto Rico	3	1		
93	Mohammed Hussein (7) and The Tahitian Warrior (2)	August 13, 1994	House show	Trujillo Alto, Puerto Rico	2	11	Defeated Ray González in a 2 on 1 handicap match.	
94	The Wildcats (Mike Anthony and Dobby Gillies)	August 24, 1994	House show	Toa Alta, Puerto Rico	2	7		
95	Mohammed Hussein (8) and The Tahitian Warrior (3)	August 31, 1994	House show	N/A	3	30		
96	Huracán Castillo, Jr. (4) and Ray González (7)	October 30, 1994	House show	N/A	1	68		
97	La Conexión Cubana (Ricky Santana (5) and Fidel Sierra (3))	January 6, 1995	House show	N/A	1	56		
98	Huracán Castillo, Jr. (5) and Ray González (8)	March 3, 1995	House show	N/A	2	106		
99	The Canadian Glamour Boys (Sean and Shane)	June 17, 1995	House show	N/A	1	57		
100	Huracán Castillo, Jr. (6) and Invader I (14)	August 13, 1995	House show	Caguas, Puerto Rico	1	70		
101	Overkill (Christopher Daniels and Kevin Quinn)	October 22, 1995	House show	San Germán, Puerto Rico	1	35		
102	The Canadian Glamour Boys (Sean Morley (2) and Rex King (5))	November 26, 1995	House show	Caguas, Puerto Rico	1	104		
103	Huracán Castillo, Jr. (7) and Ray González (9)	March 9, 1996	House show	N/A	3	28		
104	The Canadian Glamour Boys (Sean (3) and Shane (2))	April 6, 1996	House show	N/A	2	28		
105	Los Originales Nenes de las Nenas (Ray González (10) and Ricky Santana (6))	May 4, 1996	House show	Caguas, Puerto Rico	3	140		
106	The Texas Hangmen (Killer (3) and Strangler)	September 21, 1996	House show	N/A	1	161		
107	Texas Hangmen (Killer (4) and Skull Von Krush)	February 28, 1997	House show	Puerto Rico	1	1		
108	La Ley and Ray Gonzalez (11)	March 1, 1997	House show	Cayey, Puerto Rico	1	113		
109	The Islanders (Kuhio and Tahiti (4))	June 22, 1997	House show	Bayamón, Puerto Rico	1	55	Tahiti was previously known as The Tahitian Warrior.	
110	The Youngbloods (Chris Youngblood and Mark Youngblood)	August 16, 1997	House show	Bayamón, Puerto Rico	7	186	Won the titles by forfeit.	
—	Vacated	December 18, 1997	—	—	—	—		
111	Glamour Boy Shane (3) and Ricky Santana (7)	March 22, 1998	House show	Caguas, Puerto Rico	1	343	Defeated The Youngbloods in a tournament final to win the vacant titles.	
112	Starr Corporation (Chicky Starr (3) and Victor the Bodyguard)	February 28, 1999	House show	Cabo Rojo, Puerto Rico	1	223		
113	The Huertas Brothers/The Invaders (Maelo Huertas and Invader I (15))	October 9, 1999	House show	Guaynabo, Puerto Rico	1	63		
114	Starr Corporation (Bouncer Bruno and Victor the Bodyguard (2))	December 11, 1999	House show	Cabo Rojo, Puerto Rico	1	84		
—	Vacated	March 4, 2000	—	—	—	—	Title vacated due to Victor The Bodyguard leaving the promotion.	
116	Black Boy and José Rivera, Jr.	March 11, 2000	House show	Guaynabo, Puerto Rico	1	28	Black Boy and José Rivera, Jr. were awarded the vacant titles.	
117	Bouncer Bruno (2) and Dutch Mantel	April 8, 2000	House show	Guaynabo, Puerto Rico	1	21		
118	Artillería Pesada (Thunder and Lightning)	April 29, 2000	House show	Caguas, Puerto Rico	1	126		
119	The Windham Brothers (Barry Windham and Kendall Windham)	September 2, 2000	House show	Carolina, Puerto Rico	1	105		
120	Artillería Pesada (Thunder and Lightning)	December 16, 2000	House show	Carolina, Puerto Rico	2	77		
121	Rico Suave and Eddie Watts	March 3, 2001	House show	Carolina, Puerto Rico	1	56		
122	Artillería Pesada (Thunder and Lightning)	April 28, 2001	House show	Cayey, Puerto Rico	3	42		
123	Ricky Santana (8) and Rico Suave (2)	June 9, 2001	House show	Cayey, Puerto Rico	1	21		
124	The Rastamen (Rastaman and Mustapha Saed)	June 30, 2001	House show	Arecibo, Puerto Rico	1	15		
125	Artillería Pesada (Thunder and Lightning)	July 14, 2001	House show	Cayey, Puerto Rico	4	97		
—	Vacated	October 20, 2001	—	Caguas, Puerto Rico	—	—	Titles were vacated after a controversial ending of a match between Artillería Pesada and El Bronco and Super Gladiator.	
126	El Bronco (8) and Super Gladiador	November 3, 2001	House show	Carolina, Puerto Rico	1	21	Defeated Artillería Pesada in a rematch to win the vacant titles.	
127	Artillería Pesada (Thunder and Lightning)	November 24, 2001	House show	Caguas, Puerto Rico	5	112		
128	Carly Colón and Eddie Colón	March 16, 2002	House show	Caguas, Puerto Rico	1	1		
129	Artillería Pesada (Thunder and Lightning)	March 17, 2002	House show	Yauco, Puerto Rico	6	70		
130	Carly Colón (2) and Konnan	May 26, 2002	House show	Caguas, Puerto Rico	1	76		
131	Artillería Pesada (Thunder and Lightning)	August 10, 2002	House show	Humacao, Puerto Rico	7	119		
132	The Tahitians (The Tahitian Prince and The Tahitian Warrior (5))	December 7, 2002	House show	Coamo, Puerto Rico	1	113		
133	Artillería Pesada (Thunder and Lightning)	March 30, 2003	House show	Salinas, Puerto Rico	8	34		
—	Vacated	May 3, 2003	—	Caguas, Puerto Rico	—	—	Titles were vacated after a controversial ending of a match between Artillería Pesada and Los Broncos.	
135	Los Broncos (Bronco II and Bronco III)	May 10, 2003	House show	Caguas, Puerto Rico	1	8	Defeated La Artillería Pesada in a rematch to win the vacant titles.	
136	Artillería Pesada (Thunder and Lightning)	May 18, 2003	House show	Carolina, Puerto Rico	9	20		
137	Los Broncos (Bronco II and Bronco III)	June 7, 2003	House show	Cayey, Puerto Rico	2	42		
139	La Conexión Cubana (Ricky Santana (9) and Fidel Sierra (4))	July 19, 2003	House show	Carolina, Puerto Rico	2	22		
140	Los Broncos (Bronco II and Bronco III)	August 10, 2003	House show	Caguas, Puerto Rico	3	6		
141	Brent Dail and Ricky Santana (10)	August 16, 2003	House show	Nagüabo, Puerto Rico	1	7		
142	Los Broncos (Bronco II and Bronco III)	August 23, 2003	House show	Caguas, Puerto Rico	4	15		
143	Artillería Pesada (Thunder and Lightning)	September 7, 2003	House show	Guayanilla, Puerto Rico	10	96		
—	Vacated	December 12, 2003	—	—	—	—	Titles were vacated after Thunder and Lightning left the promotion.	
144	Super Gladiador (2) and Vengador Boricua	January 4, 2004	House show	Manatí, Puerto Rico	1	95	Defeated Agente Bruno and Rico Suave in a tournament final to win the vacant titles.	
145	Super Gladiador (3) and Brent Dail (2)	April 8, 2004	House show	Nagüabo, Puerto Rico	1	2	Brent Dail replaces Vengador Boricua in a title defense.	
146	Agente Bruno (3) and Rico Suave (3)	April 10, 2004	House show	Nagüabo, Puerto Rico	1	35		
147	Los Nuevos Nenes De las Nenas (Chris Joel and Alex Montalvo)	May 8, 2004	House show	Caguas, Puerto Rico	1	28		
148	Diabólico and Rico Suave (4)	June 5, 2004	House show	Caguas, Puerto Rico	1	38		
149	Los Nuevos Nenes De las Nenas (Chris Joel and Alex Montalvo )	July 13, 2004	House show	San Juan, Puerto Rico	2	39		
150	Delta Force (Cannon and Viper (5))	August 18, 2004	House show	Caguas, Puerto Rico	1	96	Viper was formerly known as El Bronco III.	
151	Viper (6) and El Rebelde	November 25, 2004	House show	Caguas, Puerto Rico	1	<1	Viper selected El Rebelde as a tag team partner while Cannon was injured.	
152	The Starr Corporation (Huracán Castillo, Jr. (8) and Chicky Starr (4))	November 25, 2004	House show	Caguas, Puerto Rico	1	16		
153	The New Delta Force (The Tahitian Warrior (6) and Viper (7))	December 11, 2004	House show	Caguas, Puerto Rico	1	26		
154	The Starr Corporation (Huracán Castillo, Jr. (9) and Chicky Starr (5))	January 6, 2005	House show	Caguas, Puerto Rico	2	16		
155	Diabólico (2) and Rico Suave (5)	January 22, 2005	House show	Caguas, Puerto Rico	2	7		
156	The Starr Corporation (Huracán Castillo, Jr. (10) and Chicky Starr (6))	January 29, 2005	House show	Caguas, Puerto Rico	3	7		
157	La Doble D Dominicana (Diabólico (3) and Diamante Dominicano (2))	February 5, 2005	House show	Caguas, Puerto Rico	1	70	El Diamante was formerly known as Black Boy.	
158	El Bronco (9) and Diamante Dominicano (3)	March 17, 2005	House show	Humacao, Puerto Rico	1	30	El Bronco replaced and injured Diabólico.	
159	Delta Force (Cannon (2) and Viper (8))	April 16, 2005	WWC Friday Madness	Gurabo, Puerto Rico	2	42		
160	Alex Montalvo (3) and Chicky Starr (7)	May 28, 2005	House show	Gurabo, Puerto Rico	1	28		
161	Delta Force (Cannon (3) and Viper (9))	June 25, 2005	House show	Florida, Puerto Rico	3	14		
162	Joe Bravo and Vengador Boricua (2)	July 9, 2005	House show	Salinas, Puerto Rico	1	70		
163	Eric Alexander and Rico Suave (6)	September 17, 2005	House show	Salinas, Puerto Rico	1	21		
164	Joe Bravo (2) and Vengador Boricua (3)	October 8, 2005	House show	Ponce, Puerto Rico	2	28		
165	Salt 'n' Pepper (Derrick King and Stan Lee)	November 5, 2005	WWC 32nd Aniversario 2005	Bayamón, Puerto Rico	1	28		
166	Chris Joel (3) and Demolition X	December 3, 2005	House show	Cayey, Puerto Rico	1	50		
—	Vacated	January 22, 2006	—	—	—	—		
167	Los Nuevos Nenes de las Nenas (Chris Joel (4) and Alex Montalvo (4))	February 4, 2006	WWC La Hora de la Verdad III	Bayamón, Puerto Rico	1	49	Defeated The Market Crashers (Nasdaq and Dow Jones) in a tournament final to win the vacant titles.	
168	Cassidy Riley and James Storm	March 25, 2006	WWC Honor vs. Traicion III	Carolina, Puerto Rico	1	69		
169	America's Most Wanted (James Storm (2) and Chris Harris)	June 2, 2006	N/A	Vega Baja, Puerto Rico	1	1	Chris Harris replaced Cassidy Riley who left the promotion.	
170	El Poder Supremo (Tim Arson and Rico Suave (7))	June 3, 2006	WWC Summer Madness Tour 2006	Carolina, Puerto Rico	1	70		
171	The New Starr Corporation (Huracán Castillo, Jr. (11) and Chris Joel (5))	August 12, 2006	WWC 33rd Aniversario 2006	Bayamón, Puerto Rico	1	22		
172	El Poder Supremo (Tim Arson (2) and Rico Suave (8))	September 3, 2006	WWC Septiembre Negro Tour	Bayamón, Puerto Rico	2	34		
173	The New Starr Corporation (Huracán Castillo, Jr. (12) and Chris Joel (6))	October 7, 2006	House show	Bayamón, Puerto Rico	2	47		
174	Terror, Inc. (Black Pain and Hannibal)	November 23, 2006	WWC Crossfire	Carolina, Puerto Rico	1	58		
175	Noriega and Jose Rivera, Jr. (2)	January 20, 2007	House show	Manatí, Puerto Rico	1	21	Defeated Terror Inc. a 2 referees match.	
176	Juventud Rebelde (Chris Joel (7) and Noriega (2))	February 10, 2007	House show	Manatí, Puerto Rico	1	35	Noriega chose Joel to replace Jose Rivera, Jr. after he left the promotion.	
177	Terror, Inc. (Black Pain and Hannibal)	March 17, 2007	WWC Camino A La Gloria 2007	Bayamón, Puerto Rico	2	42		
178	Juventud Rebelde (Chris Joel (8) and Noriega (3))	April 28, 2007	House show	Bayamón, Puerto Rico	2	14		
179	Los Compadres (El Bronco (10) and Rico Suave (9))	May 12, 2007	House show	Bayamón, Puerto Rico	1	42		
180	Juventud Rebelde (Chris Joel (9) and Noriega (4))	June 23, 2007	House show	Bayamón, Puerto Rico	3	35	Defeated Los Compadres and Lancaster and Mr. X in three-way match.	
181	La Legion del Armagedon (Greco and Romano)	July 28, 2007	House show	Bayamón, Puerto Rico	1	50		
182	Artillería Pesada (Thunder and Lightning)	September 15, 2007	WWC La Veganza Septiembre Negro Tour	Caguas, Puerto Rico	11	69	Defeated La Juventud Rebelde and La Legion del Armagedon in a 3-way match.	
183	Juventud Rebelde (Chris Joel (10) and Noriega (5))	November 24, 2007	House show	Bayamón, Puerto Rico	4	43		
184	Artillería Pesada (Thunder and Lightning)	January 6, 2008	WWC Euphoria Tour 2008	San Juan, Puerto Rico	12	20	Defeated La Juventud Rebelde in a TLC match.	
185	Juventud Rebelde (Chris Joel (11) and Noriega (6))	January 26, 2008	House show	Hatillo, Puerto Rico	5	7	Defeated La Artillería Pesada in a No DQ match.	
186	Artillería Pesada (Thunder and Lightning)	February 2, 2008	House show	Lares, Puerto Rico	13	14		
187	The Texas Outlaws (Todd Dean and Brian Gamble)	February 16, 2008	House show	Yauco, Puerto Rico	1	14		
188	Artillería Pesada (Thunder and Lightning)	March 1, 2008	House show	Toa Baja, Puerto Rico	14	14	Defeated The Texas Outlaws in a Coal Miner's Match with a Cow Bell on a Pole.	
189	The Texas Outlaws (Todd Dean and Brian Gamble)	March 15, 2008	House show	Lares, Puerto Rico	2	7		
190	Artillería Pesada (Thunder and Lightning)	March 22, 2008	WWC Camino A La Gloria Tour	Bayamón, Puerto Rico	15	1		
191	Juventud Rebelde (Chris Joel (12) and Noriega (7))	March 23, 2008	WWC Camino A La Gloria Tour	Manatí, Puerto Rico	6	28		
192	Artillería Pesada (Thunder and Lightning)	April 20, 2008	House show	Quebradillas, Puerto Rico	16	6	Thunder defeat Juventud Rebelde in a Handicap match.	
193	The New Texas Outlaws (Bad Boy Bradley and Todd Dean (3))	April 26, 2008	House show	Bayamón, Puerto Rico	1	84		
194	D'Jour Twins (Dave D'Jour and David D'Jour)	July 19, 2008	WWC 35th Aniversario 2008	San Juan, Puerto Rico	1	21		
195	The New Texas Outlaws (Bad Boy Bradley and Todd Dean (4))	August 9, 2008	House show	Carolina, Puerto Rico	2	35		
196	Artillería Pesada (Thunder and Lightning)	September 13, 2008	House show	Nagüabo, Puerto Rico	17	7		
197	Los Renegados del Infierno (Renegade del Infierno I and Renegade del Infierno II)	September 20, 2008	WWC Septiembre Negro	Bayamón, Puerto Rico	2	21	Formerly Known as La legión del Armagedon.	
198	Artillería Pesada (Thunder and Lightning)	October 11, 2008	House show	Bayamón, Puerto Rico	18	91	Defeated Los Renegados del Infierno and Rick Adonis and Love Adonis in a 3-way match.	
200	La Evolución Hardcore (Huracán Castillo, Jr. (13) and Rico Suave (10))	January 10, 2009	House show	Bayamón, Puerto Rico	1	56		
201	Artillería Pesada (Thunder and Lightning)	March 7, 2009	House show	Bayamón, Puerto Rico	19	161	Defeated La Evolución Hardcore in a TLC match.	
202	The American Family (Idol Stevens and Shawn Spears)	August 15, 2009	WWC Summer Madness Tour	Bayamón, Puerto Rico	1	77		
203	Artillería Pesada (Thunder and Lightning)	October 31, 2009	WWC Halloween Wrestling Xtravaganza Tour	Bayamón, Puerto Rico	20	77	Defeated The American Family in a Masks vs. Titles Match.	
204	La Amenaza Ilegal (Chicano and Bryan)	January 16, 2010	WWC Euphoria Mega Event	San Juan, Puerto Rico	1	35		
205	Chicano (2) and Idol Stevens (2)	February 20, 2010	House show	Bayamón, Puerto Rico	1	21	Idol Stevens replaces Bryan who left the company.	
206	Artillería Pesada (Thunder and Lightning)	March 13, 2010	House show	Caguas, Puerto Rico	21	22		
207	The New American Family (Idol Stevens (3) and King Tonga, Jr.)	April 4, 2010	House show	Aguadilla, Puerto Rico	1	20	Defeated Lightning in a Handicap match.	
208	Los Aéreos (Carlitos and Hiram Tua)	April 24, 2010	WWC Honor Vs. Traicion 2010	Bayamón, Puerto Rico	1	48		
209	Idol Stevens (4) and Abbad	June 11, 2010	House show	Ponce, Puerto Rico	1	30		
210	Artillería Pesada (Thunder and Lightning)	July 11, 2010	WWC 37th Aniversario 2010 Weekend	Bayamón, Puerto Rico	22	76	Defeated Abbad and Idol Stevens and La Zona Urbana in 3-way match.	
211	Zona Urbana (BJ and Chicano (3))	September 25, 2010	House show	Bayamón, Puerto Rico	1	7		
212	Artillería Pesada (Thunder and Lightning)	October 2, 2010	House show	Bayamón, Puerto Rico	23	21	Defeated La Zona Urbana in a Masks vs Titles match.	
213	Zona Urbana (BJ (2) and Chicano (4))	October 23, 2010	House show	Bayamón, Puerto Rico	2	7		
214	Artillería Pesada (Thunder and Lightning)	October 30, 2010	House show	Manatí, Puerto Rico	24	43	Defeated La Zona Urbana in a Texas Tornado match.	
215	Los Rabiosos (Mr. Big and Blitz)	December 12, 2010	WWC Euforia 2011	Bayamón, Puerto Rico	1	34		
216	Artillería Pesada (Thunder and Lightning)	January 15, 2011	House show	Bayamón, Puerto Rico	25	7		
217	Los Rabiosos (Mr. Big and Blitz)	January 22, 2011	House show	Bayamón, Puerto Rico	2	27	Defeated La Artillería Pesada in a Barbed Wire match.	
218	Black Pain (3) and Mad Man Manson	February 19, 2011	House show	Carolina, Puerto Rico	1	35		
219	Los Rabiosos (Mr. Big and Blitz)	March 26, 2011	House show	Carolina, Puerto Rico	3	35	Defeated Black Pain and Mad Man Manson in a street fight.	
220	BJ (3) and Joe Bravo (3)	April 30, 2011	House show	Cataño, Puerto Rico	1	42	Defeated Mr. Big in a handicap match.	
221	Los Fugitivos de la Calle (Niche and Lynx)	June 11, 2011	House show	Carolina, Puerto Rico	1	84	Defeated Joe Bravo in a handicap match.	
222	Tommy Diablo and Johnny Ringo	September 3, 2011	House show	Bayamón, Puerto Rico	1	7		
223	Los Fugitivos de la Calle (Niche and Lynx)	September 10, 2011	House show	Carolina, Puerto Rico	2	14		
†	Los Dueños de la Malicia (Dennis Rivera and Noel Rodriguez)	September 24, 2011	House show	Caguas, Puerto Rico	1	42	Became the unified tag team champions of Puerto Rico and the reign of the WWC World Tag Team Championship is also recognized by IWA.	
224	Los Fugitivos de La Calle (Niche and Lynx)	November 5, 2011	House show	Santurce, Puerto Rico	3	63		
225	The Máximos Bros. (Joel Máximo and Wil Máximo)	January 7, 2012	WWC Euphoria Tour 2012	Bayamón, Puerto Rico	1	70		
226	Los Fugitivos de la Calle (Niche and Lynx)	March 17, 2012	House show	Bayamón, Puerto Rico	4	35	Defeated The Máximo Brothers in a 2 Referees No D.Q. match.	
227	El Nuevo Mando (Bolo the Red Bulldog and Diabolico (4))	April 21, 2012	House show	Santurce, Puerto Rico	1	49		
228	Los Arcángeles (El Cuervo and Tommy Diablo (2))	June 9, 2012	House show	Cataño, Puerto Rico	1	35		
229	El Nuevo Mando (El Hombre Bestia Angel and Diabolico (5))	July 14, 2012	House show	Guaynabo, Puerto Rico	1	20	Defeated Tommy Diablo in handicap match.	
—	Vacated	August 3, 2012	—	Ponce, Puerto Rico	—	—	Titles vacated after El Hombre Bestia Angel left the promotion.	
230	Artillería Pesada (Thunder and Lightning)	December 9, 2012	WWC Lockout	Bayamón, Puerto Rico	26	62	Defeated The Sons of Samoa for the vacant titles.	
231	The Sons of Samoa (Afa Jr. and L.A. Smooth (7))	February 9, 2013	House show	Cataño, Puerto Rico	1	49	Smooth was previously known as The Tahitian Warrior.	
232	Artillería Pesada (Thunder and Lightning)	March 30, 2013	WWC Camino A La Gloria	Bayamón, Puerto Rico	27	22		
233	Andy Leavine and Samson Walker	April 21, 2013	House show	Cataño, Puerto Rico	1	69		
234	The Sons of Samoa (Afa Jr. (2) and L.A. Smooth (8))	June 29, 2013	WWC Summer Madness	Caguas, Puerto Rico	2	85	Defeated Andy Leavine and Samson Walker and La Artillería Pesada in a 3-way match.	
235	Zona 101 (Chicano (5) and Abbad (2))	September 22, 2013	House show	Bayamón, Puerto Rico	1	55	Defeat The Sons of Samoa and La Artillería Pesada in a 3-way match.	
236	The Sons of Samoa (Afa Jr. (3) and L.A. Smooth (9))	November 16, 2013	WWC Crossfire Day 1	Bayamón, Puerto Rico	3	50		
237	Chicano (6) and Xix Xavant	January 5, 2014	WWC Euphoria Day 2	Bayamón, Puerto Rico	1	104		
238	Los Templarios (William de la Vega and Ash)	April 19, 2014	WWC Camino A La Gloria	Bayamón, Puerto Rico	1	64		
239	Los Boricuas (Miguel Pérez Jr. (3) and Huracán Castillo, Jr. (14))	June 22, 2014	House show	Bayamón, Puerto Rico	3	27		
—	Vacated	July 19, 2014	—	—	—	—	The titles were vacated by the Box and Lucha Commission due to the controversial ending to the title match between Los Boricuas and Los Templarios.	
240	Los Templarios (William de la Vega and Ash)	August 16, 2014	House show	Bayamón, Puerto Rico	2	112	Defeated Los Boricuas in a rematch.	
241	Los Boricuas (Miguel Pérez Jr. (4) and Huracán Castillo, Jr. (15))	December 6, 2014	WWC Lockdown Day 2	Bayamón, Puerto Rico	4	84	Defeated Los Templarios in a Street Fight.	
—	Vacated	February 28, 2015	—	Cataño, Puerto Rico	—	—	The titles was vacated after the match ends in a double pin (Castillo Pins one of La Revolucion member and the other member of La Revolución pins Miguel Pérez Jr.).	
242	La Revolución (La Revolucion II and La Revolucion III)	March 14, 2015	House show	Bayamón, Puerto Rico	1	154	Defeated Los Boricuas in a rematch.	
243	El Hijo de Ray González and Mike Mendoza	August 15, 2015	House show	Bayamón, Puerto Rico	1	21		
244	La Revolución (La Revolucion II and La Revolucion III)	September 5, 2015	House show	Cataño, Puerto Rico	2	183		
245	Juventud Extrema (El Cuervo (2) and Mike Mendoza(2))	March 6, 2016	House show	Bayamón, Puerto Rico	1	10		
—	Vacated	March 16, 2016	—	Bayamón, Puerto Rico	—	—	The titles were held up after a match against La Revolución.	
246	Juventud Extrema (El Cuervo (3) and Mike Mendoza(3))	March 26, 2016	House show	Bayamón, Puerto Rico	2	35	Defeated La Revolución to win the vacant titles in a Ladder Match.	
247	La Revolución (La Revolucion I and La Revolucion II (2))	April 30, 2016	House show	Bayamón, Puerto Rico	1	1	Defeated La Artillería Pesada, The Bankers Club and Juventud Extrema in a Fatal 4-Way.	
248	Juventud Extrema (El Cuervo (4) and Mike Mendoza(4))	May 28, 2016	House show	Bayamón, Puerto Rico	3	28		
249	La Revolución (La Revolucion I (2) and La Revolucion II (3))	June 25, 2016	House show	Caguas, Puerto Rico	2	161		
250	Artillería Pesada (Thunder and Lightning)	December 3, 2016	WWC Superestrellas de la Lucha Libre Sabado	Carolina, Puerto Rico	28	77		
251	La Revolución (La Revolucion I (3) and La Revolucion II (4))	February 18, 2017	WWC Superestrellas de la Lucha Libre Domingo	Bayamón, Puerto Rico	3	98		
252	El Cuervo (5) and El Hombre Bestia Angel (2)	May 27, 2017	House show	Bayamón, Puerto Rico	1	49		
253	La Revolución (La Revolucion I (4) and La Revolucion II (5))	July 15, 2017	House show	Bayamón, Puerto Rico	4	259		
254	Khaos and Abbadon	March 31, 2018	WWC Camino A La Gloria Day 1	Manati, Puerto Rico	1	70		
255	La Revolución (La Revolucion I (5) and La Revolucion II (6))	June 9, 2018	WWC La Hora De La Verdad 2018	Guaynabo, Puerto Rico	5	129		
256	Gilbert and Pedro Portillo	October 16, 2018	House show	Luquillo, Puerto Rico	1	18		
257	Artillería Pesada (Thunder and Lightning)	November 3, 2018	House show	Luquillo, Puerto Rico	29	147		
258	La Revolución (La Revolucion I (6) and La Revolucion II (7))	March 30, 2019	House show	Morovis, Puerto Rico	6	49	Defeated La Artillería Pesada and Doom Patrol: Cold and Death Warrant in a 3-way match.	
259	Doom Patrol (Cold and Death Warrant)	May 18, 2019	House show	Toa Alta, Puerto Rico	1	35		
260	Chicano (7) and Xix Xavant (2)	June 22, 2019	House show	Manatí, Puerto Rico	2	21		
261	Doom Patrol (Cold and Death Warrant)	July 13, 2019	WWC Honor Vs Traicion 2019	Toa Alta, Puerto Rico	2	35		
262	La Revolución (La Revolucion I (7) and La Revolucion II (8))	August 17, 2019	WWC Aniversario 46 Day 2	Guaynabo, Puerto Rico	7	112	Defeated Doom Patrol, La Potencia, Steve Joel and Jay Velez, and Clan Freedom in a 5-way match.	
263	Khaos and Abaddon	December 7, 2019	WWC Lockout 2019	Bayamón, Puerto Rico	2	428		
264	La Formula (Steve Joel & Jay Vélez)	February 7, 2021	WWC Cuentas Pendientes	San Juan, Puerto Rico	1	399	Exposicion en casa	
265	Doom Patrol (Cold & Deth Warrant)	March 13, 2022	Exposicion en casa	Manati, Puerto Rico	3	0	Defeat Joel in a handicap match when Vélez no-shows; ordered to defend the title immediately after the match.	
266	La Revolución (Zcion RT1 & Julio Jimenez)	March 13, 2022	Exposicion en casa	Manati, Puerto Rico	1	69		
267	La Seguridad (Gevara & JP)	May 21, 2022	Exposicion en casa	Manati, Puerto Rico	1	161	Defeat Zcion in a handicap match when Jimenez is injured.	
268	La Revolucion	October 29, 2022	Exposicion en casa	Juana Diaz, Puerto Rico	11	98	Revealed as Zcion RT1 & Julio Jimenez on 22-12-10.	
269	Makabro & Androide 787	February 4, 2023	Exposicion en casa	Juana Diaz, Puerto Rico	1	49	By default when La Revolución no-show the title defence.	
270	Los Inmortales	March 25, 2023	Exposicion en casa	San Juan, Puerto Rico	1	43	Exposicion en casa	
271	La Revolucion	May 7, 2023	Exposicion en casa	Villalba, Puerto Rico	12	146		
272	La Artillería Ilegal (Chicano (8) & Lightning (30))	September 30, 2023	Exposicion en casa	Bayamon, Puerto Rico	1	112	Exposicion en casa	
273	La Revolución	January 20, 2024	Exposicion en casa	Bayamón, Puerto Rico	13	35		
274	Los MVP (Chicano (9) & Mike Nice)	February 24, 2024	Exposicion en casa	Moca, Puerto Rico	1	140		
275	Black Pain (4) & Nihan	July 13, 2024	Día Del Fanatico	Bayamón, Puerto Rico	1	49		
276	Mr. Big (4) & Lightning (31)	August 31, 2024	Aniversario 51	Bayamón, Puerto Rico	1	21		
277	Intelecto 5 Estrellas & Gilbert (2)	September 21, 2024	Septiembre Negro	Trujillo Alto, Puerto Rico	1	84		
278	Chicano (10) & Lightning (32)	December 14, 2024	Lockout	Bayamón, Puerto Rico	2	56		
279	La Revolución	February 8, 2025	La Hora de la Verdad	Bayamón, Puerto Rico	14	49		
280	Los Inmortales	March 29, 2025	La Noche Que No Necesita Nombre	Trujillo Alto, Puerto Rico	2	63		
281	La Revolución	May 31, 2025	Summer Madness	Bayamón, Puerto Rico	15	140		
282	Mike Nice (2) & Oscar Benabe	October 18, 2025	Halloween Wrestling Xtravaganza	Bayamón, Puerto Rico	1	196		
—	Vacated	May 2, 2026	—	Humacao, Puerto Rico	—	—	The titles were held up after a match against Los Informantes.	
283	Mike Nice (3) & Oscar Benabe (2)	May 16, 2026	Furia Extrema	Bayamón, Puerto Rico	2	43		
284	Amadeo Solé & Lou Forza	June 28, 2026	Aniversario 53	Ponce, Puerto Rico	1	118		
285	Los Immortales	October 24, 2026	Halloween Wrestling Xtravanganza	Bayamón, Puerto Rico	3	29		

== Combined reigns as a tag team ==
†	Indicates the current champion

Rank	Team	No. of reigns	Combined days
1	Artillería Pesada (Thunder and Lightning)	29	1,731
2	The Funk Brothers (Terry Funk and Dory Funk, Jr.)	2	1,061
3	La Revolución (La Revolucion I and La Revolucion II)	7	809
4	The Youngbloods (Chris Youngblood and Mark Youngblood)	7	580
5	Khaos and Abaddon	2	498
6	The Rock 'n' Roll RPMs (Mike Davis and Tommy Lane)	2	413
7	La Formula (Steve Joel & Jay Vélez)	1	399
8	Glamour Boy Shane and Ricky Santana	1	343
9	The Texas Hangmen (Killer and Psycho)	3	308
10	La Revolución (La Revolucion II and La Revolucion III)	2	337
11	Invader I and José Rivera	3	268
12	Los Dinámicos (Carlos Colón and José Rivera)	1	231
13	The Medics/The Super Médicos (Medic I and Medic II)	2	206
14	Huracán Castillo, Jr. and Ray González	3	202
15	Los Fugitivos de la Calle (Niche and Lynx)	4	196
16	Kendo Nagasaki and Mr. Pogo	4	190
17	El Bronco and Invader I	3	189
18	The Sons of Samoa (Afa Jr. and L.A. Smooth)	3	184
19	Los Templarios (William de la Vega and Ash)	2	176
20	The Invaders (Invader I and Invader II)	2	174
21	The Batten Twins (Bart Batten and Brad Batten)	4	164
22	Juventud Rebelde (Chris Joel and Noriega)	6	162
23	Delta Force (Cannon and Viper)	3	152
24	Ray González and Ricky Santana	1	140
25	Mohammed Hussein and Dusty Wolfe	2	135
26	Carlos Colón and Pedro Morales	1	133
27	Chicano and Xix Xavant	2	125
28	Abudda Dein and Rip Rogers	2	123
29	The Starr Cousins (Chicky and Ron Starr)	2	121
30	The New Texas Outlaws (Bad Boy Bradley and Todd Dean)	2	119
31	The Invaders (Invader I and Invader III)	2	117
32	Los Pastores (Butch Miller and Luke Williams)	2	115
33	La Ley and Ray González	1	113
33	The Tahitians (The Tahitian Prince and The Tahitian Warrior)	1	113
34	El Bronco and Ray González	3	111
35	Los Boricuas (Miguel Pérez Jr. and Huracán Castillo, Jr.)	2	111
36	The Windham Brothers (Barry Windham and Kendall Windham)	1	105
37	El Poder Supremo (Tim Arson and Rico Suave)	2	104
38	The Canadian Glamour Boys (Sean Morley and Rex King)	1	104
39	Terror, Inc. (Black Pain and Hannibal)	2	100
40	Joe Bravo and Vengador Boricua	2	98
41	Ray González and Rex King	1	97
42	Los Rabiosos (Mr. Big and Blitz)	3	96
43	The Heartbreakers (Heartbreaker Apollo and Heartbreaker Adonis)	3	95
44	Super Gladiador and Vengador Boricua	1	95
45	Huracán Castillo, Jr. and Mohammad Hussein	1	90
46	Los Originales Nenes de las Nenas (Ray González and Ricky Santana)	2	85
46	The Canadian Glamour Boys (Sean and Shane)	2	85
47	Starr Corporation (Bouncer Bruno and Victor the Bodyguard)	1	84
47	Starr Corporation (Chicky Starr and Victor the Bodyguard)	1	84
47	The Moondogs (Moondog Rex and Moondog Spot)	1	84
48	La Conexión Cubana (Ricky Santana and Fidel Sierra)	2	78
49	The American Family (Idol Stevens and Shawn Spears)	1	77
50	Carly Colón and Konnan	1	76
50	The New York Rockers (Al Perez and Joe Savoldi)	1	76
51	Juventud Extrema (El Cuervo and Mike Mendoza)	3	73
52	Los Broncos (Bronco II and Bronco III)	4	71
53	Los Renegados del Infierno/La Legion del Armagedon; Renegade del Infierno I and Renegade del Infierno II/Greco and Romano	2	71
54	Doom Patrol (Cold Warrant and Death Warrant)	2	70
55	Huracán Castillo, Jr. and Invader I	1	70
55	La Doble D Dominicana (Diabólico and Diamante Dominicano)	1	70
55	The Máximos Bros. (Joel Máximo and Wil Máximo)	1	70
56	Cassidy Riley and James Storm	1	69
56	The Fabulous Kangaroos (Al Costello and Don Kent)	2	69
56	The New Starr Corporation (Huracan Castillo Jr. and Chris Joel)	2	69
57	Andy Leavine and Samson Walker	1	69
58	Los Nuevos Nenes De las Nenas (Chris Joel and Alex Montalvo )	2	67
59	Doug Masters and Ron Starr	2	66
60	The Super Médicos (Medic I and Medic III)	1	65
61	Los Mercenarios (Cuban Assassin and Jerry Morrow)	1	64
62	The Huertas Brothers/The Invaders (Maelo Huertas and Invader I)	1	63
63	Puerto Rican Express (Huracán Castillo, Jr. and Miguel Pérez, Jr.)	2	58
64	Mohammed Hussein and El Vigilante	1	58
64	Puerto Rican Express (Huracán Castillo, Jr. and Miguel Pérez, Jr.)	1	58
65	Dan Kroffat and Tama	1	57
66	La Evolución Hardcore (Huracán Castillo and Rico Suave)	1	56
66	Rico Suave and Eddie Watts	1	56
67	Los Mercenarios (Cuban Assassin and Ron Starr)	1	55
67	The Islanders (Kuhio and Tahiti)	1	55
67	Zona 101 (Chicano and Abbad)	1	55
68	Mohammed Hussein and The Tahitian Warrior	3	52
69	Chris Joel and Demolition X	1	50
70	El Cuervo and El Hombre Bestia Angel	1	49
70	El Nuevo Mando (Bolo the Red Bulldog and Diabolico)	1	49
70	Los Nuevos Nenes de las Nenas (Chris Joel and Alex Montalvo)	1	49
70	The Samoans (Afa and Sika)	1	49
71	Los Aéreos (Carlitos and Hiram Tua)	1	48
72	Diabólico and Rico Suave	2	45
73	BJ and Joe Bravo	1	42
73	Los Compadres (El Bronco and Rico Suave)	1	42
73	The Continental Dream (Lance Idol and Rick Valentine)	1	42
74	Carlos Colón and Invader I	1	40
75	The Starr Corporation (Huracán Castillo, Jr. and Chicky Starr)	3	39
76	The Southern Rockers (Steve Doll and Rex King)	1	38
77	Mohammed Hussein and Doug Sanders	1	36
78	Agente Bruno and Rico Suave	1	35
78	Black Pain and Mad Man Manson	1	35
78	La Amenaza Ilegal (Chicano and Bryan)	1	35
78	Gino de la Serra and Pierre Martel	1	35
78	Los Arcángeles (El Cuervo and Tommy Diablo)	1	35
78	The International Males (Christopher Daniels and Kevin Quinn)	1	35
79	Idol Stevens and Abbad	1	30
79	El Bronco and Diamante Dominicano	1	30
79	Scorpio and Mr. Tempest	1	30
80	Black Gordman and Medic I	1	29
80	Invader I and Pierre Martel	1	29
81	Alex Montalvo and Chicky Starr	1	28
81	Black Boy and José Rivera, Jr.	1	28
81	Salt 'n' Pepper (Derrick King and Stan Lee)	1	28
82	Jason the Terrible and Steve Strong	1	27
83	The New Delta Force (The Tahitian Warrior and Viper)	1	26
84	The Hunters (Bob Brown and Dale Veasey)	1	25
85	The Texas Outlaws (Todd Dean and Brian Gamble)	2	21
86	Bouncer Bruno and Dutch Mantel	1	21
86	Chicano and Idol Stevens	1	21
86	D'Jour Twins (Dave D'Jour and David D'Jour)	1	21
86	El Bronco (4) and Ciclón Salvadoreño	1	21
86	El Bronco and Super Gladiador	1	21
86	El Hijo de Ray González and Mike Mendoza	1	21
86	Eric Alexander and Rico Suave	1	21
86	Huracán Castillo and Pierre Martel	1	21
86	Noriega and Jose Rivera, Jr.	1	21
86	Ricky Santana and Rico Suave	1	21
87	El Nuevo Mando (El Hombre Bestia Angel and Diabolico)	1	20
87	Gran Apollo and Pierre Martel	1	20
87	Hercules Ayala and King Tonga	1	20
87	The New American Family (Idol Stevens and King Tonga, Jr.)	1	20
88	Kengo Kimura and Hiro Sasaki	1	19
88	Mr. Pogo and TNT	1	19
89	Gilbert and Pedro Portillo	1	18
90	The Rastamen (Rastaman and Mustapha Saed)	1	15
91	Zona Urbana (BJ and Chicano)	2	14
92	Rex King and Ricky Santana	2	13
92	The Wildcats (Mike Anthony and Dobby Gillies)	2	13
93	La Conexión Comunista (Mohammad Hussein and Fidel Sierra)	1	13
94	Tommy Diablo and Johnny Ringo	1	7
94	Brent Dail and Ricky Santana	1	7
95	Heartbreaker Adonis (4) and Doug Masters	1	5
96	Super Gladiador and Brent Dail	1	2
97	America's Most Wanted (James Storm and Chris Harris)	1	1
97	Carly Colón and Eddie Colón	1	1
97	The Texas Hangmen (Killer and Skull Von Krush)	1	1
98	Puerto Rican Express (Huracán Castillo, Jr. and Miguel Pérez, Jr.)	1	1
98	Ángel Mexicano and Fidel Sierra	1	<1
98	Viper and El Rebelde	1	<1

== Combined Reigns by wrestler ==
Rank	Team	No. of reigns	Combined days
1	Lightning	29	1,731
1	Thunder	29	1,731
2	La Revolucion II	9	1,146
3	Terry Funk	2	1,061
3	Dory Funk, Jr.	2	1,061
5	La Revolucion I	7	809
6	Ricky Santana	11	800
7	Invader I	15	730
8	Ray González	13	635
9	Huracán Castillo, Jr.	15	586
10	Chris Youngblood	7	580
10	Mark Youngblood	7	580
11	José Rivera	4	499
12	Khaos	2	498
12	Abbadon	2	498
13	Chris Joel	12	462
14	El Bronco	10	393
15	Shane/Glamour Boy Shane	3	428
16	Mike Davis	2	413
16	Tommy Lane	2	413
17	Steve Joel	1	399
17	Jay Vélez	1	399
18	Rico Suave	10	380
19	Mohammed Hussein	9	357
20	L.A. Smooth/The Tahitian Warrior	9	348
21	Carlos Colón	3	311
22	Texas Hangman Killer	4	309
23	Texas Hangman Psycho	3	308
24	Chicky/Chicky Starr	7	272
25	Medic I	3	270
26	Viper/Bronco III	9	249
27	Ron Starr	5	242
28	Chicano	6	229
29	Mr. Pogo	5	209
30	Medic II	2	206
31	Niche	4	196
31	Lynx	4	196
32	Kendo Nagasaki	4	190
33	Sean/Sean Morley	3	189
34	Noriega	6	183
35	Ash	2	176
35	William de la Vega	2	176
36	Invader II	2	174
37	Miguel Pérez, Jr.	4	147
38	Bart Batten	4	164
38	Brad Batten	4	164
39	Afa Jr.	3	157
40	Idol Stevens	4	148
40	Rex King	4	148
41	Bouncer Bruno/Agente Bruno	3	140
42	Pedro Morales	1	133
43	Abbuda Dein	2	123
43	Rip Rogers	2	123
44	Cuban Assassin	2	119
45	Super Gladiador	3	118
47	Invader III	3	86
48	Butch Miller	2	115
48	Luke Williams	2	115
49	Tim Arson	2	104
50	Xix Xavant	1	104
51	Heartbreaker Adonis	4	100
52	Black Pain	2	100
52	Hannibal	2	100
53	Heartbreaker Apollo	3	95
54	Abbad	2	85
54	Butch Miller	2	85
54	Luke Williams	2	85
55	Moondog Rex	1	84
55	Moondog Spot	1	84
56	Carly Colón	2	77
57	Shawn Spears	1	77
58	Al Perez	1	76
58	Joe Savoldi	1	76
59	El Cuervo	3	73
59	Mike Mendoza	3	73
60	Doug Masters	3	71
61	Renegade del Infierno I/Greco	2	71
61	Renegade del Infierno II/Romano	2	71
62	Pierre Martel	3	70
63	Cold Warrant	2	70
63	Death Warrant	2	70
63	James Storm	2	70
64	Al Costello	2	69
64	Don Kent	2	69
65	Cassidy Riley	1	69
66	Jerry Morrow	1	64
67	Dan Kroffat	1	57
67	Tama	1	57
68	BJ	3	56
69	Afa	1	49
69	Sika	1	49
70	Carlitos	1	48
70	Hiram Tua	1	48
71	Rick Valentine	1	42
71	Lance Idol	1	42
72	Steve Doll	1	38
73	Christopher Daniels	1	35
73	Gino de la Serra	1	35
73	Kevin Quinn	1	35
74	Mr. Tempest	1	30
74	Scorpio	1	30
75	Black Gordman	1	29
76	Jason the Terrible	1	27
76	Steve Strong	1	27
77	Ciclón Salvadoreño	1	21
77	Dave D'Jour	1	21
77	David D'Jour	1	21
77	Huracán Castillo, Sr.	1	21
78	Kengo Kimura	1	19
78	Hiro Sasaki	1	19
78	TNT	1	19
79	Dobbie Gillis	2	13
79	Mike Anthony	2	13
80	Brent Dail	1	7
81	Chris Harris	1	1
81	Eddie Colón	1	1
81	Skull Von Krush	1	1
82	Ángel Mexicano	1	<1
82	Fidel Sierra	1	<1
