= José González (wrestler) =

Puerto Rican professional wrestler (born 1947)

José Huertas González
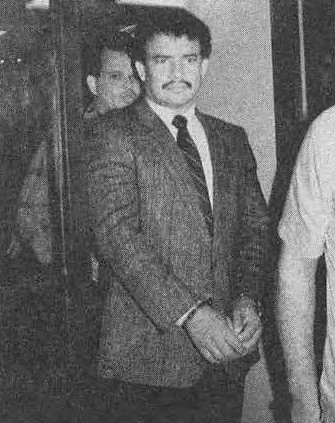
- González in 1988

Personal information
- Born: José Huertas González; March 18, 1946 (age 80) San Lorenzo, Puerto Rico
- Children: 3

Professional wrestling career
- Ring name(s): Invader #1; José González; Manuel Cruz; Sabu Singh; The Prophet
- Billed height: 5 ft 10 in (178 cm)
- Billed weight: 230 lb (104 kg)
- Billed from: San Lorenzo, Puerto Rico
- Trained by: Elson Gondeas
- Debut: 1965
- Retired: 2022

José Huertas González (born March 18, 1946) better known as Invader 1, is a Puerto Rican retired professional wrestler, who wrestled in the United States and around the world, especially in Puerto Rico. He was charged with murder in the death of wrestler Frank Goodish (Bruiser Brody), but stated he had acted in self-defense, and was acquitted. Critics of the acquittal alleged that the trial was marred by several contentious circumstances, which included key witnesses to the incident being unable to testify due to receiving their summonses after the trial had concluded, discrepancies in witness testimony (including allegations contrary to the testimony which event investors had corroborated), and the knife with which Goodish had been killed never having been recovered.

== Wrestling career ==
Since 1973, he was a wrestler and booker for the World Wrestling Council and wrestled for the International Wrestling Association. He held the Puerto Rico heavyweight title twelve times between 1977 and 2001, and the WWC Television Title five times between 1986 and 1991. He retired in 2006 to enter politics.

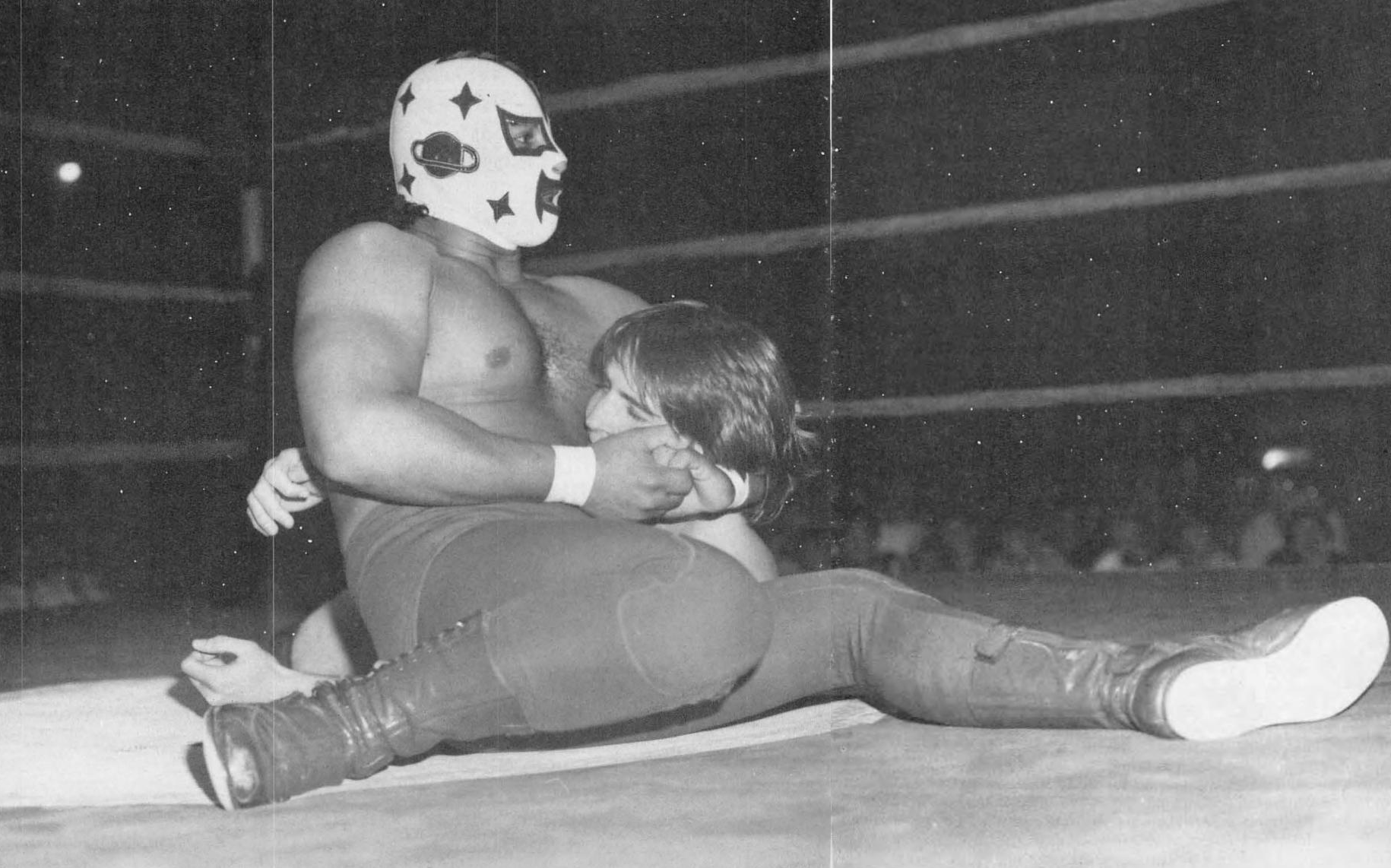
The Invader (left) with a headlock on Bobby Bass (right), circa 1985

González began wrestling as The Prophet in Chicago. In 1972 he joined the WWF. When he returned to Puerto Rico to fight with Capitol Sports Promotions, he took on the masked persona of The Invader so his mother would not know he was a wrestler. He fought on The Invaders tag team with Roberto Soto as Invader 2 and then Johnny Rivera as Invader 3. The Invaders worked as a mid-card tag team in the WWF in the early 1980s. They left WWF in 1984. He would return to Puerto Rico working for International Wrestling Association (Puerto Rico) and World Wrestling Council.

In 2011, he returned to the ring, wrestling as Invader 1.

In 2012, González became the corporative director of the World Wrestling League. In 2015, he was inducted into the Salón de los Inmortales.

In 2019, he wrestled at 73 years old.

González made an appearance at IWA on March 12, 2022, in Humacao, Puerto Rico with arch enemy Chicky Starr as a guest referees for a tag team match between Savio Vega & Electro against Manny Ferno & Khris Diaz.

April 30, 2022 in Humacao, Puerto Rico on Juicio Final, with Savio Vega & Chicky Starr as guest referees he defeated Manny Ferno to win the World Championship. His last match was that August.

== Death of Bruiser Brody ==
In July 1988, González fatally stabbed professional wrestler Frank Donald Goodish, known as Bruiser Brody, backstage during a wrestling event in Puerto Rico. González was acquitted of murder in 1989 after a jury accepted that he was acting in self-defense. Another wrestler, Tony Atlas, says he witnessed the stabbing in the locker room showers, but the knife used in the stabbing was not recovered. Tony Atlas and Dutch Mantel were called to testify, however the subpoenas were mailed late, arriving ten days after the trial ended. The investigation was criticised in Dark Side of the Ring and two books about Brody: Bruiser Brody (Crowbar Press) and Brody (ECW Press).

== Home fire ==
On August 11, 2014, a fire at González's home destroyed a car, a motorcycle and part of his house.

== Championships ==
- International Wrestling Association
  - IWA World Heavyweight Championship (Puerto Rico) (1 time)
  - IWA Intercontinental Heavyweight Championship (1 time)
  - IWA World Tag Team Championship (1 time) - with Savio Vega
- Pro Wrestling Illustrated
  - PWI ranked him #130 of the top 500 singles wrestlers in the PWI 500 in 1993 and 1994
- World Wrestling Council
  - WWC Universal Heavyweight Championship (2 times)
  - WWC Caribbean Heavyweight Championship (5 times)
  - WWC Puerto Rico Heavyweight Championship (12 times)
  - WWC North American Heavyweight Championship (4 times)
  - WWC Television Championship (6 times)
  - WWC World Tag Team Championship (15 times) - with José Rivera (3), Invader III (3), El Bronco (3), Invader II (2), Pierre Martel (1), Carlos Colón (1), Huracán Castillo, Jr. (1), Maelo Huertas (1)
  - WWC Caribbean Tag Team Championship (6 times) - with Invader IV (4), Super Gladiator (1) and Invader III (1)
  - WWC North American Tag Team Championship (6 times) - with Super Gladiator (2), Invader III (2), Invader II (1) and Carlos Colón (1)
- Universal Wrestling Promotions
  - UWP Caribbean Tag Team Championship (1 time) - Invader II
- NWA San Francisco
  - NWA World Tag Team Championship (San Francisco version) (3 times) - with Invader II (2) and Don Muraco (1)
- Pacific Northwest Wrestling
  - NWA Pacific Northwest Tag Team Championship (1 time) - with Al Madril
- World Wrestling League
  - Salón de los Inmortales (class of 2015)
- Wrestling Observer Newsletter
  - Most Disgusting Promotional Tactic (1989) Babyface push one year after the Bruiser Brody stabbing case
  - Most Disgusting Promotional Tactic (1990) Stabbing angle with Atsushi Onita

== Luchas de Apuestas record ==
Winner (wager)	Loser (wager)	Location	Event	Date	Notes
Invader 1 (career)	Chicky Starr (hair)	Bayamón, Puerto Rico	WWC Aniversario 87	September 20, 1987	
