= WWC Television Championship =

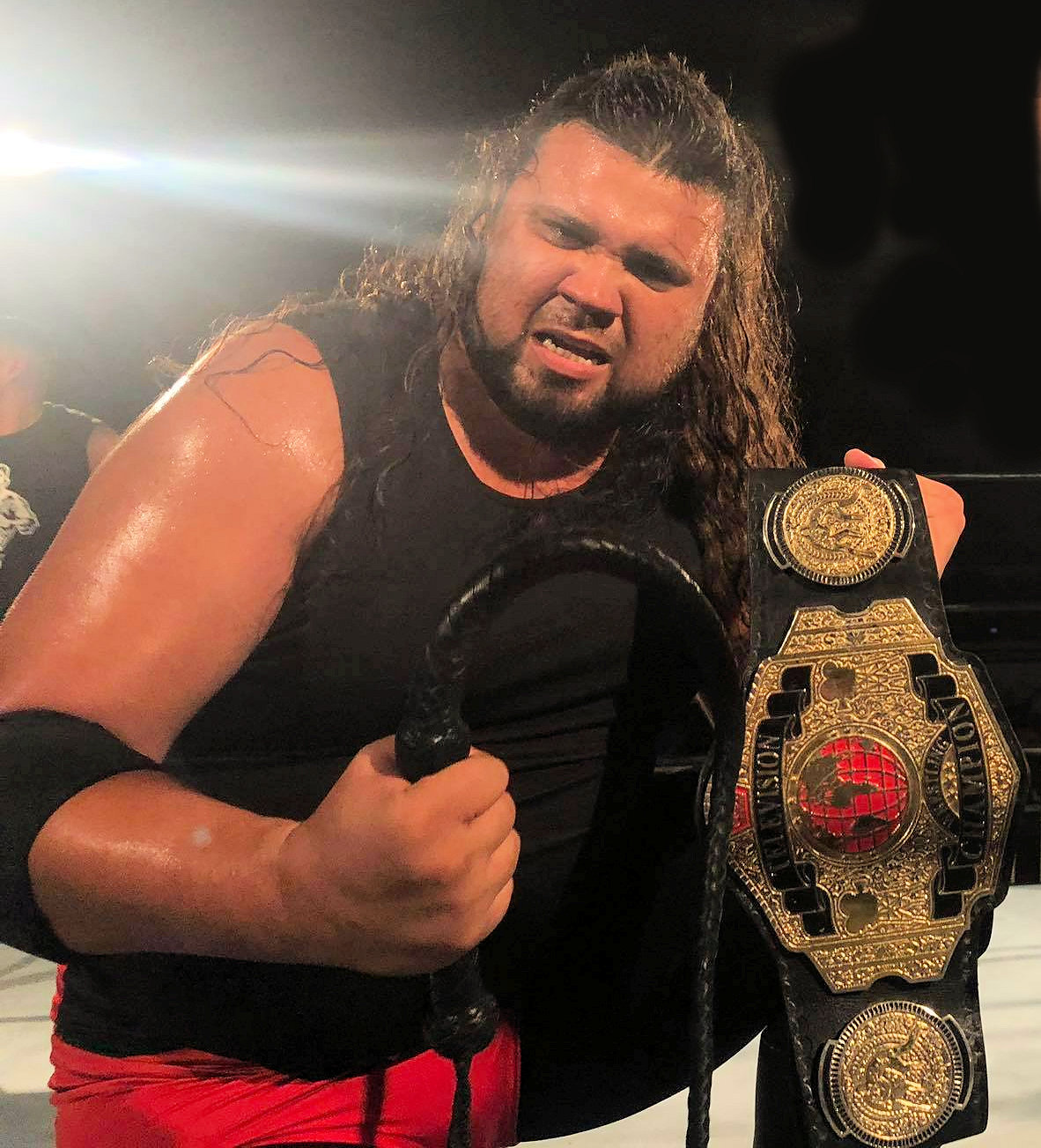
- Former champion Gran Armando, with the title belt

Details
- Promotion: World Wrestling Council; New Wrestling Stars
- Date established: September 19, 1986
- Current champion: La Amenaza Bryan
- Date won: September 26, 2026
Statistics
- First champion: Ron Starr
- Most reigns: Shane The Glamour Boy (7 reigns)
- Longest reign: Sean Morley (435 days)
- Shortest reign: Barrabás, Jr. (<1 day)
- Oldest champion: Carlos Colón (53 years, 325 days)
- Heaviest champion: King Kong (453 lbs)
- Lightest champion: Hammett (185 lbs)

The WWC Television Championship is a tertiary championship that is currently defended in the World Wrestling Council. The title was initially created in 1986 and used until 2003, then from February 3, 2007 until July 11, 2008. The title was brought back again on March 31, 2018, unofficially replacing the WWC Junior Heavyweight Championship.

== Title History ==
Key
No.	Overall reign number
Reign	Reign number for the specific champion
Days	Number of days held
<1	Reign lasted less than a day
+	Current reign is changing daily

No.	Champion	Championship change			Reign statistics		Notes	Ref.
No.	Champion	Date	Event	Location	Reign	Days	Notes	Ref.
1	Ron Starr	September 19, 1986	WWC 13th Aniversario 1986 – Round 1: Ponce	Ponce, Puerto Rico	1	47	Defeated Invader I in a tournament final to become the inaugural champion.	
2	Invader I	November 5, 1986	House show	San Juan, Puerto Rico	1	73		
3	Jason the Terrible	January 17, 1987	House show	Caguas, Puerto Rico	1	244		
4	Invader I	September 18, 1987	House show	San Juan, Puerto Rico	2	36		
5	Grizzly Boone	October 24, 1987	House show	Bayamón, Puerto Rico	1	32		
6	Invader I	November 25, 1987	House show	Bayamón, Puerto Rico	3	44		
—	Vacated	January 8, 1988	House show	San Juan, Puerto Rico	—	—	Title held up after a controversial ending of a match between Invader I and Super Black Ninja.	
7	Super Black Ninja	February 6, 1988	House show	Guaynabo, Puerto Rico	1	56	Won a tournament final for the vacant title	
8	Invader I	April 2, 1988	House show	Bayamón, Puerto Rico	4	84		
9	Ron Starr	June 25, 1988	House show	Carolina, Puerto Rico	2	56		
10	Carlos Colón	August 20, 1988	House show	Bayamón, Puerto Rico	1	161		
11	Jason the Terrible	January 28, 1989	House show	Carolina, Puerto Rico	2	35	Also defeat TNT for the WWC Caribbean Heavyweight Championship on November 18, 1988 in Carolina, Puerto Rico.	
12	Carlos Colón	March 4, 1989	House show	Carolina, Puerto Rico	2	105	This was a barbed wire match for both WWC Television and Universal Heavyweight titles.	
13	TNT	June 17, 1989	House show	San Juan, Puerto Rico	1	237		
—	Vacated	February 9, 1990	Superestrellas de la Lucha Libre	Caguas, Puerto Rico	—	—	Title vacated after TNT won the Universal Heavyweight Championship.	
14	Leo Burke	March 24, 1990	House show	Caguas, Puerto Rico	1	32	Defeat Carlos Colón in a tournament final to win the vacant title.	
15	TNT	April 25, 1990	House show	San Juan, Puerto Rico	2	241		
—	Vacated	December 22, 1990	House Show	San Juan, Puerto Rico	—	—	After TNT resigned the title.	
16	Original TNT (Action Jackson)	January 26, 1991	House show	Caguas, Puerto Rico	1	63	Defeat TNT in a 6-man tournament final, Action Jackson claimed to be recognized as TNT under his very name as he called himself the original one. He later lost "his" name to the true TNT.	
17	TNT	March 30, 1991	House show	Bayamón, Puerto Rico	3	21		
18	King Kong	April 20, 1991	House show	Bayamón, Puerto Rico	1	58		
19	TNT	June 1, 1991	House show	Bayamón, Puerto Rico	4	140		
20	Fidel Sierra	October 19, 1991	House show	Bayamón, Puerto Rico	1	7	Also defeat Super Medico III for the WWC Caribbean Heavyweight Championship on August 3, 1991 in Bayamón, Puerto Rico.	
21	TNT	October 26, 1991	House show	Carolina, Puerto Rico	5	28		
22	Dick Murdoch	November 23, 1991	House show	Yabucoa, Puerto Rico	1	32		
23	Invader I	December 25, 1991	House show	San Juan, Puerto Rico	5	12		
24	Dick Murdoch	January 6, 1992	House show	San Juan, Puerto Rico	2	188		
—	Vacated	July 12, 1992	House Show	San Juan, Puerto Rico	—	—	Title has been declared inactive.	
25	Carlos Colón	April 2, 1994	House show	Caguas, Puerto Rico	3	127	Defeat Mighty Kodiak in a tournament final.	
—	Vacated	August 7, 1994	House show	Ponce, Puerto Rico	—	—	Title vacated after Carlos Colón won the Universal Heavyweight Championship.	
26	Dutch Mantel	September 11, 1994?	House show	Arecibo, Puerto Rico	1	13	Won a 6-man tournament final for the vacant title.	
27	Huracán Castillo Jr.	September 24, 1994?	House show	Caguas, Puerto Rico	1	28		
28	Jason The Terrible	October 22, 1994?	House show	Orocovis, Puerto Rico	3	35		
29	Invader I	November 26, 1994?	House show	San Juan, Puerto Rico	6	42		
30	Rex King	January 7, 1995	House show	San Sebastián, Puerto Rico	1	42		
31	Sean Morley	February 18, 1995	House show	Trujillo Alto, Puerto Rico	1	25		
32	Ricky Santana	March 15, 1995	House show	Bayamón, Puerto Rico	1	36		
33	Rex King	April 20, 1995	House show	San German, Puerto Rico	2	222		
34	Pulgarcito	October 28, 1995?	House show	Bayamón, Puerto Rico	1	29		
35	Mighty Kodiak	November 26, 1995	House show	Caguas, Puerto Rico	1	41		
36	Sweet Brown Sugar	January 6, 1996	House show	Caguas, Puerto Rico	1	77		
37	Ricky Santana	March 23, 1996	House show	Caguas, Puerto Rico	2	28		
38	"Jungle" Jim Steele	April 20, 1996	House show	Caguas, Puerto Rico	1	28		
39	El Bronco I	May 18, 1996	House show	Caguas, Puerto Rico	1	12		
40	Sean Morley	May 30, 1996	House show	Caguas, Puerto Rico	2	435	Still recognized as champion even in 1997 when he joins WWF.	
41	Steve Strong	August 8, 1997	House show	Caguas, Puerto Rico	1	64		
42	Miguel Pérez Jr.	October 12, 1997	House show	Caguas, Puerto Rico	1	26		
43	Derrick Dukes	November 7, 1997	House show	Caguas, Puerto Rico	1	14		
44	Tom Brandi	November 21, 1997	House show	Caguas, Puerto Rico	1	37		
45	Curtis Jackson	December 28, 1997	House show	Bayamón, Puerto Rico	1	27		
46	Glamour Boy Shane	January 24, 1998	House show	Bayamón, Puerto Rico	1	21		
47	Sean Morley	February 14, 1998	House show	Caguas, Puerto Rico	3	14		
48	Glamour Boy Shane	February 28, 1998	House show	Caguas, Puerto Rico	2	34		
49	Sean Morley	April 4, 1998	House show	Caguas, Puerto Rico	4	42		
50	Glamour Boy Shane	May 16, 1998	House show	Caguas, Puerto Rico	3	21		
51	Christopher Daniels	June 6, 1998	House show	Caguas, Puerto Rico	1	63		
52	Kevin Quinn	August 8, 1998	House show	Caguas, Puerto Rico	1	63		
53	Glamour Boy Shane	October 10, 1998	House show	Caguas, Puerto Rico	4	33		
54	Steve Strong	November 12, 1998	House show	Caguas, Puerto Rico	2	169		
55	Glamour Boy Shane	April 30, 1999	House show	Guaynabo, Puerto Rico	5	106		
56	Mustafa Saed	August 14, 1999	WWC 26th Aniversario	Caguas, Puerto Rico	1	36		
57	Glamour Boy Shane	September 19, 1999	House show	Caguas, Puerto Rico	6	55		
58	Chicky Starr	November 13, 1999	House show	Nagüabo, Puerto Rico	1	54		
59	Glamour Boy Shane	January 6, 2000	House show	Caguas, Puerto Rico	7	73		
60	Rex King	March 19, 2000	House show	Cabo Rojo, Puerto Rico	3	336		
61	Alex Pourteau	February 18, 2001	House show	Fajardo, Puerto Rico	1	62		
62	Chris Grant	April 21, 2001	House show	Orocovis, Puerto Rico	1	139		
63	Alex Pourteau	July 7, 2001	House show	Carolina, Puerto Rico	2	20		
—	Vacated	July 27, 2001	House show	Maricao, Puerto Rico	—	—	Title vacated after Alex Pourteau left World Wrestling Council.	
64	Chris Grant	August 4, 2001	House show	Orocovis, Puerto Rico	2	35	Defeat Richie Santiago to win the title vacated by Alex Pourteau.	
65	Bad Boy Bradley	September 8, 2001	WWC 28th Aniversario: Septiembre Negro	Bayamón, Puerto Rico	1	28		
66	Super Gladiador	October 6, 2001	House show	Caguas, Puerto Rico	1	133		
67	Ricky Santana	February 16, 2002	House show	Aibonito, Puerto Rico	3	49		
68	Rico Suave	April 6, 2002	House show	Humacao, Puerto Rico	1	21		
69	Ray González	April 27, 2002	House show	San Lorenzo, Puerto Rico	1	42		
70	Carlos Colón	June 8, 2002	House show	Toa Baja, Puerto Rico	4	7		
71	Ray González	June 15, 2002	House show	Caguas, Puerto Rico	2	21		
72	Wilfredo Alejandro	July 6, 2002	House show	Cayey, Puerto Rico	1	28	Won a 10-man Battle Royal.	
73	Fidel Sierra	August 3, 2002	House show	Coamo, Puerto Rico	2	86		
74	Black Boy (El Diamante)	October 26, 2002	WWC vs XWF Invasión 2002	Bayamón, Puerto Rico	1	223		
75	Chris Candido	June 7, 2003	House show	Cayey, Puerto Rico	1	42		
76	Vengador Boricua	July 19, 2003	WWC 30th Aniversario	Carolina, Puerto Rico	1	14		
77	El Diamante	August 2, 2003	House show	Guayanilla, Puerto Rico	2	28	This was also for the WWC Puerto Rico Heavyweight Championship.	
—	Unified	August 30, 2003	House show	Guayanilla, Puerto Rico	—	—	El Diamante unified the title with the WWC Puerto Rico Heavyweight Championship. After this, it was deactivated.	
NWS World Television Championship
78	Ash Rubinsky	June 4, 2006	House show	San Sebastián, Puerto Rico	1	244	Defeated Livewire in a tournament final for the reactivated title by New Wrestling Stars (NWS).	
WWC World Television Championship
79	Barrabás, Jr.	February 3, 2007	House show	Caguas, Puerto Rico	1	<1	The title once again became exclusive to the World Wrestling Council, being renamed back to the original name of the WWC Television Championship.	
80	Superstar Romeo	February 3, 2007	House show	Caguas, Puerto Rico	1	42	The match between Superstar Romeo and Barrabás, Jr. restarted due to Jr. using an illegal object.	
81	Rico Suave	March 17, 2007	House show	Bayamón, Puerto Rico	2	42		
82	Crazy Rudy	April 28, 2007	House show	Bayamón, Puerto Rico	1	112	This was an extreme rules match.	
83	Rico Suave	August 18, 2007	House show	Vega Baja, Puerto Rico	3	27		
84	Huracán Castillo Jr.	September 14, 2007	House show	Ponce, Puerto Rico	2	36	This was a three way match also involving "Jumping" Jeff Jeffrey for both WWC Television and WWC Puerto Rico Heavyweight Championship.	
85	Rico Suave	October 20, 2007	House show	Bayamón, Puerto Rico	4	29		
—	Vacated	November 18, 2007	House show	—	—	—	Title vacated due to Rico Suave suffering a legitimate injury in a match against Bryan.	
86	Ash Rubinsky	November 24, 2007	House show	Bayamón, Puerto Rico	2	42	This was a 7 man battle royal for the vacant title.	
—	Vacated	January 5, 2008	—	Maunabo, Puerto Rico	—	—	Title vacated after Ash Rubinsky left World Wrestling Council.	
88	BJ	January 6, 2008	WWC Euphoria Tour 2008	San Juan, Puerto Rico	1	55	This was an 11 man battle royal for the vacant title.	
89	Hammett	March 1, 2008	House show	Toa Baja, Puerto Rico	1	14		
90	BJ	March 15, 2008	House show	Lares, Puerto Rico	2	56		
91	Chris Joel	May 10, 2008	House show	Bayamón, Puerto Rico	1	62		
—	Deactivated	July 11, 2008	—	—	—	—	Title deactivated due to Chris Joel leaving World Wrestling Council. The promotion later abandoned the title.	
92	Bellito	March 31, 2018	House show	Manati, Puerto Rico	1	7	This was a battle royal for the vacant title. Bellito won by lastly eliminating OT Fernandez.	
93	OT Fernández	April 7, 2018	House show	Dorado, Puerto Rico	1	63		
94	Bellito	June 9, 2018	House show	Guaynabo, Puerto Rico	2	133		
95	Diabólico	October 20, 2018	House show	Caguas, Puerto Rico	1	77		
96	Bellito	January 5, 2019	WWC Euphoria 4 – Day	Guaynabo, Puerto Rico	3	119		
97	Diabólico	May 4, 2019	House show	Toa Alta, Puerto Rico	2	14		
98	Zcion RT1	May 18, 2019	WWC Honor Vs Traicion 2019	Toa Baja, Puerto Rico	1	119		
99	Gran Armando	September 14, 2019	WWC Septiembre Negro 2019	Caguas, Puerto Rico	1	133		
100	Chicano	January 25, 2020	House show	Manati, Puerto Rico	1	21		
101	Gran Armando	February 15, 2020	House show	Manati, Puerto Rico	2	364		
102	Zcion RT1	February 13, 2021	Cuentas Pendientes	San Juan, Puerto Rico	2	167		
103	El Hombre Bestia Angel	July 30, 2021	House Show	Caguas, Puerto Rico	1	226		
104	Mike Nice	March 13, 2022	House Show	Manatí, Puerto Rico	1	216		
105	El Informante	October 15, 2022	House Show	Manatí, Puerto Rico	1	139		
106	JC Jexx	March 3, 2023	House Show	San Juan, Puerto Rico	1	190		
107	El Informante	September 9, 2023	House Show	Bayamon, Puerto Rico	2	77		
108	Jovan	November 25, 2023	House show	Moca, Puerto Rico	1	56		
109	Bryan Idol	January 20, 2024	Euphoria	Bayamon, Puerto Rico	1	70		
110	Lightning	March 30, 2024	Camino a la Gloria	Trujillo Alto, Puerto Rico	1	105		
111	Zcion RT1	July 13, 2024	WWC House Show	Bayamón, Puerto Rico	3	112		
112	Mike Nice	November 2, 2024	WWC House Show	Ponce, Puerto Rico	2	7		
—	Vacated	November 9, 2024	—	—	—	—		
113	Mike Nice	December 14, 2024	Lockout	Bayamón, Puerto Rico	3	77		
114	Amaddeo Solé	March 1, 2025	Noche de Campeones	Bayamón, Puerto Rico	1	420		
115	Wilfredo Rivera	April 25, 2026	La Resistencia	Bayamón, Puerto Rico	1	20		
116	Bryan Idol	May 16, 2026	Furia Extrema	Bayamón, Puerto Rico	2	42		
117	Wilfredo Rivera	June 27, 2026	Aniversario 53	San Juan, Puerto Rico	2	91	Defeat Bryan Idol, Lightning and Makabro in a 4-Way match.	
118	La Amenaza Bryan	September 26, 2026	Septiembre Negro 2026	Bayamón, Puerto Rico	1	1		

== Combined reigns ==
†	Indicates the current champion

Rank	Wrestler	No. of reigns	Combined days
1	TNT	5	667
2	Rex King	3	600
3	Sean Morley	4	516
4	Gran Armando	2	497
5	Amadeo Solé	1	420
6	Carlos Colón	4	406
7	Zcion RT1	3	398
8	Jason The Terrible	3	314
9	Mike Nice	3	300
10	Invader I	6	291
11	Ash Rubinsky	2	286
12	Bellito	3	275
13	El Diamante	2	251
14	Glamour Boy Shane	7	247
15	Steve Strong	2	234
16	Hombre Bestia Angel	1	226
17	Dick Murdoch	2	220
18	El Informante	2	210
19	J.C. Jexx	1	190
20	Chris Grant	2	181
21	Super Gladiador	1	133
22	Rico Suave	4	122
23	Ricky Santana	3	113
24	Bryan Idol	2	112
24	Crazy Rudy	1	112
25	BJ	2	111
25	Wilfredo Rivera	2	111
26	Lightning	1	105
27	Ron Starr	2	103
28	Fidel Sierra	2	93
29	Diabolico	2	91
30	Alex Pourteau	2	83
31	Sweet Brown Sugar	1	77
32	Huracán Castillo, Jr.	2	64
33	Action Jackson/ Original TNT	1	63
33	Christopher Daniels	1	63
33	Kevin Quinn	1	63
33	OT Fernandez	1	63
34	Chris Joel	1	62
35	King Kong	1	58
36	Super Black Ninja	1	56
36	Jovan	1	56
37	Chicky Starr	1	54
38	Ray González	2	53
39	Tom Brandi	1	47
40	Chris Candido	1	43
41	Superstar Romeo	1	42
42	Mighty Kodiak	1	41
43	Mustafa Saed	1	36
44	Wilfredo Alejandro	1	33
45	Grizzly Boone	1	32
45	Leo Burke	1	32
46	Pulgarcito	1	29
47	Bad Boy Bradley	1	28
47	"Jungle" Jim Steele	1	28
47	Miguel Pérez, Jr.	1	28
48	Curtis Jackson	1	27
49	Chicano	1	21
50	Derrick Dukes	1	14
50	Hammett	1	14
50	Vengador Boricua	1	14
51	Dutch Mantell	1	13
52	El Bronco I	1	12
53	La Amenaza Bryan	1	1+
54	Barrabás, Jr.	1	<1
