= Jason the Terrible =

Canadian professional wrestler

Personal information
- Born: Karl Moffat; July 31, 1960 (age 66) Windsor, Ontario, Canada

Professional wrestling career
- Ring name(s): Hans Hermann; The Jackal; Jason the Terrible; Karl Moffat; The Spoiler
- Billed height: 1.91 m (6 ft 3 in)
- Billed weight: 121 kg (267 lb)
- Debut: 1983
- Retired: 2004

Karl Moffat (born July 31, 1960), better known by the ring name Jason the Terrible, is a Canadian professional wrestler. He is best known for his appearances with Stampede Wrestling and in Japan.

== Professional wrestling career ==
In August 1981, Moffat attacked a Stampede Wrestling wrestler in the ring, and was tackled through the ropes onto a table.

Moffat debuted in Stu Hart's Stampede Wrestling promotion in 1983 under the name Karl "Butch" Moffat. During the mid-1980s, he would win several tag team titles including (Vancouver) All Star Tag Team Championship and the Grand Prix Tag Team Championship in 1984 and 1985. He also had a successful singles career with the World Wrestling Council in Puerto Rico, twice winning that promotion's Television Championship as well as its Caribbean and Tag Team titles between 1987 and 1989.

Moffat also had a successful run with Stampede Wrestling, feuding with Owen Hart as Jason the Terrible, with white overalls, a hockey mask, and a chainsaw. However, Bret Hart claims that he was bleeding too much in his matches. Ross Hart agrees, saying that "it was a bit of a turn off with our audience", although Ross also stated that Moffatt was a good wrestler and that he was a big fan of his character.

Moffat won the Canadian Rocky Mountain Wrestling North American Championship twice in 1993 and 1994, winning it from Chris Jericho and Eric Freeze. On September 23, 1994, he teamed with Randy Rudd and defeated Sonny Corleone and Rob Austin to win the Canadian Rocky Mountain Wrestling Tag Team Championships.

In 1998, he wrestled two matches for Steve Wilde and Otto Gentile's Can-Am Wrestling Federation, losing to both Dr. Hannibal (in a Falls count anywhere match) and the Cuban Assassin. In 2004, Moffat wrestled three matches in Top Ranked Wrestling, one singles match and two tag team matches. He won his first singles match, before winning one and losing one of the tag-team matches.

Later that year, Moffat lost to R.A.G.E. in All Star Pro Wrestling, in what was his final match.

Karl Moffatt made his return to the ring under the Jason the Terrible gimmick for Real Canadian Wrestling in Edmonton where he teamed with Katana to face C-Block in a bloody street fight. Moffatt return to RCW March 2013 to win the Canadian Tag titles with Partner Steven Styles by defeating C-Block in a Bloody brawl.

Jason/Styles lost the tag titles to The Hardliners on May 24 in Camrose, Alberta.

Moffat, as Jason The Terrible did do a show for Hart Legacy Wrestling in Calgary, Alberta, but he and other wrestlers were not paid.

== Personal life ==
Moffat says that he wasn't friends with most wrestlers, he kept his personal and professional life separate.

While travelling with fellow Stampede Wrestling veterans Davey Boy Smith and Chris Benoit, Moffat's left leg was fractured in two places in a head-on collision in Jasper, Alberta on July 4, 1989. The car in which Moffat was a passenger was driven by Ross Hart; although Moffat attempted to sue Hart, claiming he had been crippled by the event, he did not succeed in receiving any compensation since a moving company Moffat had worked for supplied evidence of him moving around reasonably well after the accident.

Moffat is currently a truck driver in British Columbia.

== Championships and accomplishments ==
- Atlantic Grand Prix Wrestling
  - Grand Prix Tag Team Championship (1 time) – with Karl Krupp
- Canadian Rocky Mountain Wrestling
  - CRMW North American Championship (2 times)
  - CRMW Tag Team Championship (1 time) – with Randy Rudd
- Northern Championship Wrestling
  - NCW World Tag Team Championship (1 time) – with Wild Warrior
- Pro Wrestling Illustrated
  - PWI ranked him # 348 of the 500 best singles wrestlers of the PWI 500 in 1991
- Real Canadian Wrestling
  - RCW Canadian Tag Team Championship (1 time)
- Top Ranked Wrestling
  - TRW Tag Team Championship (1 time) – with Machete Singh
- Vancouver All Star Wrestling
  - NWA Canadian Tag Team Championship (Vancouver version) (1 time) – with Spider Webb
- World Wrestling Council
  - WWC Caribbean Heavyweight Championship (3 times)
  - WWC World Tag Team Championship (1 time) - with Steve Strong
  - WWC World Television Championship (3 times)
  - WWC Puerto Rico Heavyweight Championship (1 time)
  - WWC World Junior Heavyweight Championship (1 time)
- Zero1 USA
  - Zero1 USA Underground Championship (1 time)

== Sources ==
- McCoy, Heath. Pain and Passion: The History of Stampede Wrestling. Toronto: CanWest Books, 2005. ISBN 0-9736719-8-X
- Meltzer, Dave. Tributes II: Remembering More of the World's Greatest Wrestlers. Champaign, Illinois: Sports Publishing LLC, 2004. ISBN 1-58261-817-8
