= Steve DiSalvo =

American professional wrestler (born 1949)

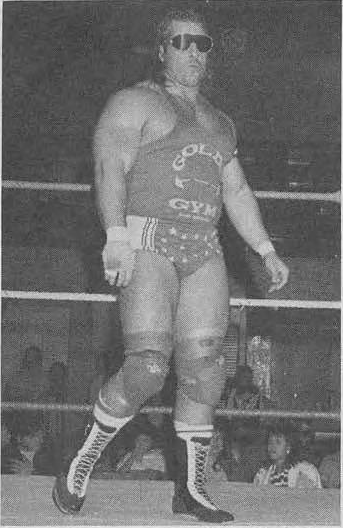

Personal information
- Born: Stephen DiSalvo; April 7, 1949 (age 77) Boston, Massachusetts, U.S.

Professional wrestling career
- Ring name(s): Billy Jack Strong; Indian Warrior; Mighty Yankee; Minotaur; Sadistic Steve; Steve DiSalvo; Steve Strong; Strangler DiSalvo
- Billed height: 6 ft 2 in (188 cm)
- Billed weight: 290 lb (132 kg)
- Billed from: Los Angeles, California
- Trained by: Billy Anderson; Red Bastien; Ross Hart; Bruce Hart
- Debut: 1985
- Retired: 2001

Stephen DiSalvo (born April 7, 1949) is an American retired professional wrestler.

== Professional wrestling career ==
=== Early career (1985-1986) ===
DiSalvo broke into professional wrestling in the mid-1980s following a career in powerlifting. He was initially trained by Billy Anderson and Red Bastien.

=== Canada (1986–1989) ===
Wrestling as Steve Strong in the 1980s, he was a performer in Montreal-based International Wrestling. He was managed by Eddy Creatchman.

DiSalvo previously had made a one-off appearance for the World Wrestling Federation (WWF) in 1987, wrestling twice on a house show event in Quebec (losing to Tito Santana via countout and defeating Outback Jack later in the night).

Moving on to Stampede Wrestling, he was known as "Strangler" Steve DiSalvo. Here, he feuded with Phil LaFleur over who had the better physique. DiSalvo smashed a trophy over LaFleur's head on TV, leading to several matches between the two. DiSalvo also helped Don Muraco win the Stampede North American Title from Mahkan Singh.

=== World Wrestling Council (1989) ===
DiSalvo moved on to the World Wrestling Council (WWC) promotion in Puerto Rico in 1989, where he again was known as "Sadistic" Steve Strong but this time with a satanic gimmick. He had brawls with Abdullah the Butcher, TNT, and Invader #1. He also won the WWC World Tag Team Championship teaming with Jason the Terrible. He also feuded with "El Acrobata de Puerto Rico" Carlos Colon. He won the WWC Universal Heavyweight Championship in a Texas Death match by defeating Colon on May 27, 1989. He had a successful reign of 133 days until Colon defeated him at The Aniversario 1989 in a Barbed Wire match in October 7. The feud ended when DiSalvo lost against Colon in a Retirement match for the WWC Universal Heavyweight Championship on November 23, 1989.

=== Various promotions (1989–1990) ===
On February 13, 1990, he received a tryout match with the WWF at a WWF Superstars taping losing to The Red Rooster. He next made an appearance on a March 18 house show in Calgary, Alberta, defeating Buddy Rose. The following month, he competed on a joint house show tour with the WWF and Arena Wrestling Alliance, tagging with Mano Yanez on three events against The Pitbulls.

=== World Championship Wrestling (1990–1991) ===
Two weeks later, DiSalvo received a tryout match for World Championship Wrestling (WCW) on April 23, 1990. He was signed to the company later that year and given the gimmick of "The Minotaur". DiSalvo made his first televised appearance on the January 5, 1991 episode of WCW Saturday Night, defeating Man Mountain Bailey. He began a house show series against The Juicer and was undefeated, and later faced The Junkyard Dog.

=== Late career (1991–2001) ===
DiSalvo also appeared in the American Wrestling Association, where he wrestled as Billy Jack Strong. He became Steve DiSalvo again and drifted around the independent circuit before retiring in 2001.

== Championships and accomplishments ==
- Americas Wrestling Federation
  - AWF World Heavyweight Championship (1 time)
- California Pro Wrestling
  - CPW Heavyweight Championship (1 time)
  - CPW Brass Knuckles Championship (2 times)
- Stampede Wrestling
  - Stampede North American Heavyweight Championship (1 time)
- World Wrestling Council
  - WWC Universal Heavyweight Championship (1 time)
  - WWC World Tag Team Championship (1 time) - with Jason the Terrible
  - WWC Television Championship (2 times)
