= WWC Aniversario =

Annual World Wrestling Council event in Puerto Rico

Aniversario is a professional wrestling card that is held annually by Puerto Rican promotion World Wrestling Council (WWC) to commemorate its anniversary. The first show was held in 1983 to mark the tenth anniversary of WWC's creation in 1973. Various WWC championships are defending at the event, and the 1986 event featured two defenses of the National Wrestling Alliance's NWA World Heavyweight Championship. The show has also been dedicated to various former professional wrestlers and personalities including Bruiser Brody in 2007 and Hugo Savinovich in 2009. In 2017, WWC did not held the Aniversario show due to the path of Hurricane Maria through Puerto Rico. Both the 2020 and 2021 Aniversario shows were also cancelled.

== 1983 ==
WWC Anniversary 1983
- Promotion: World Wrestling Council
- Date: September 17, 1983
- City: San Juan, Puerto Rico
- Venue: Hiram Bithorn Stadium

#	Results	Stipulations	Times
1	Miguel Pérez defeated Barrabas	Singles match	3:42
2	Pete Sanchez defeated Assassin #2	Singles match	0:21
3	Bob Sweetan defeated Gama Singh	Singles match	6:27
4	Hercules Ayala defeated The Iron Sheik	Singles match	4:10
5	Pierre Martel pinned Don Kent	Singles match	8:28
6	Abdullah Tamba defeated Gorilla Monsoon	Singles match	1:11
7	The Super Medics (WWC and Caribbean Tag Team Champions) defeated Chief Thundercloud and Chuy	Non-title tag team match	6:02
8	Pedro Morales (WWC North American Champion) defeated Ric Flair via DQ	Singles match	11:28
9	King Tonga (WWC Puerto Rico Heavyweight Champion) defeated Dory Funk, Jr.	Singles match	15:59
10	Invader I defeated Ox Baker	Singles match	8:32
11	Kendo Nagasaki vs El Gran Apollo went to a draw	Singles match	20:00
12	Carlos Colón (WWC Universal Heavyweight Champion) vs Harley Race (NWA World Champion) went to a draw	Singles match	60:00
13	Mil Máscaras and Dos Caras defeated The Infernos (Tim Tall Tree & Gypsy Joe)	Tag team match	8:20
14	André the Giant beat Abdullah the Butcher via countout	Singles match	9:42

== 1984 ==
WWC Anniversary 1984
- Promotion: World Wrestling Council
- Date: September 15, 1984
- City: San Juan, Puerto Rico
- Venue: Hiram Bithorn Stadium
- Attendance: 34,383

#	Results	Stipulations	Times
1	Joseph Savoldi defeated Buzz Sawyer	Singles match	6:54
2	Black Gordman defeated Jesus Castillo, Jr.	Singles match	7:46
3	Leo Burke defeated Miguel Pérez	Miguel Pérez retirement match	8:00
4	Dory Funk, Jr. vs. Al Perez went to a draw.	Singles match	20:00
5	Tom Lentz defeated Hercules Ayala	Singles match	3:03
6	King Tonga and Daniel Martel defeated The Sheepherders (Luke Williams and Butch Miller)	Tag team match	n/a
7	Randy Savage defeated Pedro Morales (c)	WWC North American Championship Singles match	8:39
8	Invader III defeated Aníbal (c)	WWC World Junior Heavyweight Championship Singles match	n/a
9	Hugo Savinovich defeated Barrabas, Sr.	Lumberjacks match	12:11
10	The Super Medics (Jose Estrada, Sr., Johnny Rodz and Don Kent) defeated Wahoo McDaniel, Mark and Jay Youngblood	3 vs. 3 tag team match	12:28
11	Invader I defeated Konga the Barbarian (c)	WWC Puerto Rican Championship match	5:00
12	Abdullah the Butcher and Carlos Colón vs. Stan Hansen and Bruiser Brody - No contest. Both teams were disqualified.	Tag team match	14:11
(c) – refers to the champion(s) heading into the match

== 1985 ==
WWC Anniversary 1985
- Promotion: World Wrestling Council
- Date: September 21, 1985
- City: San Juan, Puerto Rico
- Venue: Hiram Bithorn Stadium

#	Results	Stipulations	Times
1	Chicky Starr defeated Don Greer	Boxing match	4th Round 1:45
2	Jesse Barr defeated El Super Medico	Singles match	19:12
3	Sweet Brown Sugar defeated Dory Funk Jr.	Singles match	n/a
4	Miguel Perez Jr. defeated Eric Embry	Singles match	n/a
5	Ric Flair (c) defeated Hercules Ayala	NWA World Heavyweight Championship	n/a
6	Carlos Colon (c) vs. Abdullah The Butcher ends in a double count out	WWC Universal Heavyweight Championship	n/a
7	Invader I and Invader III defeated The Sheepherders (Butch Miller and Luke Williams)	Barbed Wire match	n/a
8	Austin Idol defeated Hercules Hernandez	Singles match	5:28
9	The Road Warriors (Road Warrior Animal and Road Warrior Hawk) defeated The Fabulous Ones (Stan Lane and Steve Keirn) via countout	Tag Team match	n/a
10	Jimmy Valiant defeated Kamala by DQ	Singles match	n/a
(c) – refers to the champion(s) heading into the match

== 1986 ==
WWC Anniversary 1986 - Night 1
- Promotion: World Wrestling Council
- Date: September 19, 1986
- City: Ponce, Puerto Rico
- Venue: Coliseo de Pachin Vicens
- Attendance: 9,500

It took place in three venues:

- Round 1: Ponce, Puerto Rico at Juan Pachin Vicens Auditorium, drawing 9,500
- Round 2: Mayaguez, Puerto Rico at the Isidoro Garcia Stadium, drawing 9,500
- Round 3: San Juan, Puerto Rico at Hiram Bithorn Stadium, drawing 23,000

#	Results	Stipulations	Times
1	Carlos Colón beat Boris Zukhov	WWC Universal Title Tournament Quarterfinals	n/a
2	Abdullah the Butcher beat Giant Baba by Count Out	WWC Universal Title Tournament Quarterfinals	n/a
3	Terry Funk beat Barry Windham	WWC Universal Title Tournament Quarterfinals	n/a
4	Rick Martel beat Bruiser Brody by Forfeit	WWC Universal Title Tournament Quarterfinals	n/a
5	Ron Starr beat Invader I	WWC Television Title Tournament Finals	n/a
6	The Rock 'n' Roll RPMs (Mike Davis & Tommy Lane) vs. Chicky Starr & Al Perez	Tag Team match	n/a
7	Super Medico beat White Knight by Reverse Decision	Singles match	n/a
8	Tony Atlas vs. Hiroshi Wajima	Singles match	n/a

September 20

WWC Anniversary 1986 - Night 2
- Promotion: World Wrestling Council
- Date: September 20, 1986
- City: Mayagüez, Puerto Rico
- Venue: Isidoro García Stadium

#	Results	Stipulations	Times
1	Carlos Colón beat Abdullah the Butcher	WWC Universal Title Tournament Semifinals	n/a
2	Terry Funk beat Rick Martel	WWC Universal Title Tournament Semifinals	n/a
3	Hiroshi Wajima defeats Huracan Castillo Jr.	Singles match	n/a
4	Dory Funk Jr. vs. Giant Baba - Draw	Singles match	n/a
5	Barry Windham beat Boris Zukhov	Singles match	n/a
6	Ric Flair (c) beat Miguel Perez, Jr.	NWA World Heavyweight Title Match	n/a
(c) – refers to the champion(s) heading into the match

September 21

WWC Anniversary 1986 - Night 3
- Promotion: World Wrestling Council
- Date: September 21, 1986
- City: San Juan, Puerto Rico
- Venue: Hiram Bithorn Stadium

#	Results	Stipulations	Times
1	El Super Medico defeats Original Medico	Singles match	n/a
2	Chicky Starr & Ron Starr (c) defeat Mighty Igor & Miguel Perez Jr.	WWC North American Tag Team Title Match	n/a
3	Al Perez defeats Barry Windham	Singles match	n/a
4	Abdullah The Butcher vs. Bruiser Brody - Double DQ	Singles match	n/a
5	The Rock 'n' Roll RPMs defeat The Sheepherders (c)	WWC Tag Team Title Match	n/a
6	Invader I beat Ric Flair (c) by DQ	NWA World Heavyweight Title Match	n/a
7	Carlos Colón beat Terry Funk	WWC Universal Title Tournament Finals	n/a
(c) – refers to the champion(s) heading into the match

== 1987 ==
WWC Anniversary 1987
- Promotion: World Wrestling Council
- Date: September 20, 1987
- City: Bayamon, Puerto Rico; Mayaguez, Puerto Rico; Ponce, Puerto Rico
- Venue: Juan Ramón Loubriel Stadium; Isidoro García Stadium; Juan Pachín Vicéns Coliseum
- Attendance: 23,000 (Bayamon); 9,500 (both Mayaguez and Ponce)

#	Results	Stipulations	Times
1	Jorge Clemente defeated Domingo Robles	Singles match	n/a
2	Cipriano Armenteros defeated Armandito Salgado	Singles match	n/a
3	Miguel Perez, Jr. defeated The Crusher	Singles match	n/a
4	Hurucan Castillo defeated El Gran Mendoza (c)	WWC Junior Heavyweight Championship match	n/a
5	The Fantastics (Bobby Fulton and Tommy Rogers) defeated Buddy Roberts and Iceman King Parsons via DQ	Tag team match	n/a
6	Stan Hansen defeated The Missing Link via DQ	Singles match	n/a
7	Mark and Chris Youngblood defeated The Hunters (Dale Veasey and Bob Brown) (c)	WWC Tag Team Championship match	n/a
8	Tony Atlas defeated The Iron Sheik	Singles match	n/a
9	The Road Warriors defeated Terry and Dory Funk, Jr. via DQ	Tag team match	n/a
10	Kareem Muhammad (WWC Puerto Rico Heavyweight Champion) defeated Mighty Igor	Singles match	n/a
11	Bruiser Brody defeated Abdullah the Butcher via DQ	"Dog collar chain" match	n/a
12	TNT defeated Mr. Pogo	Singles match	n/a
13	Carlos Colón defeated Hercules Ayala (c)	Barbed wire match for the WWC Universal Heavyweight Championship	n/a
14	Invader #1 defeated Chicky Starr	"Retirement vs. hair" match	n/a
(c) – refers to the champion(s) heading into the match

== 1988 ==
WWC Anniversary 1988
- Promotion: World Wrestling Council
- Date: September 10, 1988
- City: Bayamón, Puerto Rico
- Venue: Juan Ramon Loubriel Stadium
- Attendance: 23,000

#	Results	Stipulations	Times
1	Dutch Mantel defeated Pez Whatley	Singles match	n/a
2	Mike Graham defeated Don Kent	Singles match	n/a
3	Jimmy Valiant and Rufus R. Jones defeated The Wild Samoans via DQ	Tag team match	n/a
4	Ronnie Garvin defeated The Iron Sheik via countout	Singles match	n/a
5	Ricky Santana (WWC Puerto Rico Heavyweight Champion) defeated Mr. Pogo	Singles match	n/a
6	Chicky Starr pinned Invader #3	Singles match	n/a
7	Wahoo McDaniel pinned Danny Spivey	Singles match	n/a
8	Buddy Landel (WWC Caribbean Heavyweight Champion) beat TNT	Singles match	n/a
9	Carlos Colón beat Hercules Ayala via submission	"Fire" match	n/a
10	Kamala pinned Jimmy Valiant	Singles match	n/a
11	Brad and Bart Batten (WWC Tag Team Champions) beat The Sheepherders (Butch Miller and Luke Williams) via DQ	Tag team match	n/a
12	Huracán Castillo and Miguel Pérez, Jr. beat Bobby Jaggers and Dan Kroffat	"Hair vs. hair" tag team match	n/a

== 1989 ==
Aniversario 1989 is well known for having various changes and was postponed following the aftermath of Hurricane Hugo

WWC Anniversary 1989
- Promotion: World Wrestling Council
- Date: October 7, 1989
- City: Bayamón, Puerto Rico
- Venue: Juan Ramon Loubriel Stadium
- Attendance: 17,000

#	Results	Stipulations	Times
1	Los Mercenarios (Cuban Assassin and Jerry Morrow) beat The Caribbean Express (Miguel Perez, Jr. and Hurucan Castillo) (c)	WWC Caribbean Tag Team Championship match	n/a
2	El Super Medico (WWC Junior Heavyweight Champion) beat El Gran Mendoza	Singles match	n/a
3	Invader III beat Manny Fernandez by disqualification	Singles match	n/a
4	Jimmy Valiant pinned Kareem Muhammad	Singles match	n/a
5	Kevin Von Erich pinned Ron Bass	Singles match	n/a
6	Chris and Mark Youngblood beat Rip Rogers and Abudha Dein (c)	WWC Tag Team Championship match	n/a
7	TNT pinned Chicky Starr	"Gimmick vs. hair" match	4:57
8	Invader I beat Ivan Koloff (c)	"Russian chain" match for the WWC Puerto Rico Heavyweight Championship	n/a
9	Carlos Colón beat Steve Strong (c)	Barbed wire match for the WWC Universal Championship	n/a
(c) – refers to the champion(s) heading into the match

== 1990 ==
WWC Anniversary 1990
- Promotion: World Wrestling Council
- Date: July 7, 1990
- City: Bayamón, Puerto Rico
- Venue: Rubén Rodríguez Coliseum; Juan Ramon Loubriel Stadium

#	Results	Stipulations	Times
1	Chris Youngblood pinned Chicky Starr	Singles match	n/a
2	Monster Ripper pinned Candi Divine (c)	AWA World Women's Championship match	n/a
3	Super Medicos (Super Medico I and Super Medico III; WWC Tag Team Champions) beat The Fabulous Rougeaus (Jacques and Raymond)	Tag team match	n/a
4	Invader #1 (with Héctor Camacho and Robocop) knocked out Leo Burke (c) in the fourth round	"Boxing" match for the WWC Caribbean Heavyweight Championship	n/a
5	Zeus and Abdullah the Butcher battled to a double countout	Singles match	n/a
6	Piratita Morgan and Espectrito beat Mascarita Sagrada and Aguilita Solitaria	Tag team match	n/a
7	Scott Hall beat Atkie Malumba via disqualification	Singles match	4:57
8	Rick Valentine pinned Mark Youngblood	Singles match	n/a
9	Huracán Castillo and Miguel Pérez, Jr. (WWC Caribbean Tag Team Champions) (with Robocop) beat The Cuban Assassin and Ron Starr	Tag team match	n/a
10	Carlos Colón (WWC Universal Heavyweight Champion) and TNT went to a draw	Singles match	60:00
(c) – refers to the champion(s) heading into the match

== 1991 ==
WWC Anniversary 1991
- Promotion: World Wrestling Council
- Date: July 6, 1991
- City: Bayamón, Puerto Rico
- Venue: Juan Ramon Loubriel Stadium

#	Results	Stipulations	Times
1	Rod Price beat Super Medic III (c)	WWC Caribbean Heavyweight Championship match	n/a
2	Koko B. Ware beat Galán Mendoza	Singles match	n/a
3	Caribbean Express (Miguelito Pérez and Huracán Castillo, Jr.) (c) beat The Samoan Swat Team (Fatu and Savage)	WWC Caribbean Tag Team Championship match	n/a
4	Hugo Savinovich beat Billy Joe Travis	Special singles match	n/a
5	El Bronco beat Skandor Akbar	Revenge match	n/a
6	Monster Ripper beat El Profe	"Man vs. woman" match	n/a
7	Ricky Santana beat Action Jackson	"Loser leaves town" match	n/a
8	Invader #1 beat Ronnie Garvin	"Taped fist" match	n/a
9	TNT and Giant Warrior wrestled Demolition (Smash and Crush) to a double disqualification	Tag team match	n/a
10	Dino Bravo beat Carlos Colón (c) via reverse decision. El Vikingo was the special referee.	WWC Universal Heavyweight Championship match	n/a
(c) – refers to the champion(s) heading into the match

== 1992 ==
WWC Anniversary 1992
- Promotion: World Wrestling Council
- Date: August 8, 1992
- City: Bayamón, Puerto Rico
- Venue: Juan Ramon Loubriel Stadium

#	Results	Stipulations	Times
1	Ciclón Salvadoreño and El Vikingo defeated Randy Rhodes and El Exotico by disqualification	Tag team match	n/a
2	El Vigilante pinned Victor Jovica	Singles match	n/a
3	Chuck Williams pinned Greg Robertson	Singles match	n/a
4	Mark and Chris Youngblood beat Solid Gold	Singles match	n/a
5	Bronco #1 beat Mohammad Hussein	Singles match	n/a
6	Sasha and Amarillis beat Debbie Combs and La Tigresa	Tag team match	n/a
7	Rex King and Steve Doll (WWC Tag Champions) beat Joe and Dean Malenko	Tag team match	n/a
8	The Patriot pinned Nikolai Volkoff	Singles match	n/a
9	Paul Bunyan pinned Atkie Malumba	Singles match	n/a
10	Miguel Pérez, Jr. defeated Abdullah the Butcher by disqualification	Singles match	n/a
11	Invader #1 pinned Carlos Colón (c)	WWC Universal Heavyweight Championship match	n/a
(c) – refers to the champion(s) heading into the match

== 1993 ==
WWC Anniversary 1993
- Promotion: World Wrestling Council
- Date: August 6, 1993 August 7, 1993 August 8, 1993
- City: Caguas, Puerto Rico, Ponce, Puerto Rico, Bayamón, Puerto Rico
- Venue: Caguas Indoor Court, Pachín Vicens Auditorium, Juan Ramon Loubriel Stadium
- Attendance: 12,000

#	Results	Stipulations	Times
1	El Bronco beat El Exotico	Singles match	n/a
2	The Bushwhackers (Bushwhacker Butch and Bushwhacker Luke) beat Warlord and Mr. Hughes	Tag team match	n/a
3	Madusa beat Luna Vachon	Singles match	n/a
4	Dusty Wolfe and Mohammad Hussein (WWC Tag Team Champions) beat Jose Luis Rivera and Tiger Mike Anthony	Tag team match	n/a
5	Johnny Ace beat Doink the Clown	Singles match	n/a
6	Dan Kroffat beat La Ley	Singles match	n/a
7	Hercules Ayala and Abdullah the Butcher were both disqualified	Singles match	n/a
8	Greg Valentine beat Invader #1	WWC Universal Heavyweight Championship match	n/a
9	Carlos Colón beat Terry Funk	Singles match	n/a

== 1994 ==
WWC Anniversary 1994
- Promotion: World Wrestling Council
- Date: August 4, 1994 August 6, 1994
- City: Humacao, Puerto Rico, Bayamón, Puerto Rico
- Venue: Humacao Indoor Court, Juan Ramon Loubriel Stadium

#	Results	Stipulations	Times
1	Chris Youngblood pinned Gama Singh	Singles match	n/a
2	Miss Texas pinned La Tigresa	Singles match	n/a
3	La Ley pinned Mohammad Hussein	"Loser spends night in jail" match	n/a
4	Tahitian Warrior pinned Pulgarcito	"Loser leaves town" match	n/a
5	Paco Lopez pinned El Exotico	Singles match	n/a
6	Abdullah the Butcher beat Mr. Hughes via disqualification	Singles match	n/a
7	Ray Gonzalez and El Bronco (WWC Tag Champions) defeated The Moondogs (Moondog Rex and Moondog Spot) by disqualification	Tag team match	n/a
8	Invader #1 pinned Doomsday	"Heart punch" match	n/a
9	Dutch Mantel (WWC Universal Champion) and Carlos Colón (WWC Television Champion) went to a no-contest	Singles match	n/a
10	Eddie Gilbert beat Huracán Castillo, Jr.	"Fire" match	n/a

== 1995 ==
WWC Anniversary 1995
- Promotion: World Wrestling Council
- Date: August 13, 1995
- City: Caguas, Puerto Rico
- Venue: Coliseo Héctor Solá Bezares

#	Results	Stipulations	Times
1	Black Georgie and Che Torres vs. El Pulpo Marín and Castro Salvaje	Tag team match	n/a
2	El Exotico and Jumping Joey Maggs vs. The Moondogs (Moondog Rex and Moondog Spot)	Tag team match	n/a
3	The Patriot vs. Rex King	TV Championship match	n/a
4	El Profe vs. Chicky Starr	Winner stays as commentator on TV show	n/a
5	Mascarita Sagrada vs. Piratita Morgan	Midget match	n/a
6	Octagoncito vs. Jerito Estrada	Midget match	n/a
7	Miss Texas vs. La Tigresa	Women's Street Fight	n/a
8	Dutch Mantell vs. El Bronco	Grudge match	n/a
9	El Invader #1 and Huracán Castillo Jr. vs. "The Canadian Glamour Boys" (Sean Morley and Shane Sewell) (c)	WWC World Tag Team Championship match	n/a
10	Carlos Colón (c) vs. Hercules Ayala	WWC Universal Heavyweight Championship match	n/a
(c) – refers to the champion(s) heading into the match

== 1996 ==
WWC Anniversary 1996
- Promotion: World Wrestling Council
- Date: July 14, 1996
- City: Caguas, Puerto Rico
- Venue: Coliseo Héctor Solá Bezares

#	Results	Stipulations	Times
1	Carlos Colón beat El Bronco	Retirement vs. Deportation match	n/a
2	Invader #2 and #3 defeated The Southern Posse (Rick Thames & Sonny Trout) by disqualification in a reverse decision	Tag team match	n/a
3	La Ley de Puerto Rico and Ray González defeated Doug Furnas and Dan Kroffat	Tag team match	n/a

== 1997 ==
WWC Anniversary 1997
- Promotion: World Wrestling Council
- Date: August 15, 1997
- City: Bayamón, Puerto Rico
- Venue: Juan Ramón Loubriel Stadium

#	Results	Stipulations	Times
1	Vampire Warrior beat Herbert Gonzales	Singles match	n/a
2	El Profe and Rico Suave went to a no-contest	"Barroom brawl" match	n/a
3	Skull Von Crush beat Ram Man	Singles match	n/a
4	Luna Vachon beat La Tigresa	Singles match	n/a
5	Ricky Santana beat Mohammad Hussein	"Flag" match	n/a
6	Invader #1 and #2 went to a no contest vs The Sheepherders (Butch Miller and Luke Williams)	"Barbed wire tornado" match	n/a
7	Golden Boy beat La Ley	"Mask vs. hair" match	n/a
8	Mark and Chris Youngblood beat Islanders (Tahiti & Kuhio) (c) via forfeit	WWC Tag Team Championship match	n/a
9	Carlos Colón pinned Abdullah the Butcher	"Retirement" match	19:02
10	Ray Gonzales (WWC Universal Heavyweight Champion) beat Tom Brandi	Singles match	n/a
(c) – refers to the champion(s) heading into the match

== 1998 ==
WWC Anniversary 1998
- Promotion: World Wrestling Council
- Date: August 1, 1998
- City: San Juan, Puerto Rico
- Venue: Hiram Bithorn Stadium

#	Results	Stipulations	Times
1	El Roquero and Ritchie Santiago beat Espantos I and II	Tag team match	n/a
2	Jerry Estrada (WWC Junior Heavyweight Champion) beat Black Boy	Singles match	n/a
3	Perfect 10 beat Bret Sanders	Singles match	n/a
4	Invader II beat Invader III	"Mask vs. mask" match	n/a
5	Pierroth, Jr (WWO Intercontinental Champion) and Mil Mascaras went to a double disqualification	Singles match	n/a
6	Glamour Boy Shane pinned Villano III (c)	WWC Puerto Rican Championship match	n/a
7	Carlos Colón pinned Ray Gonzalez (c)	WWC Universal Championship match	n/a
8	Ricky Santana pinned El Texano	"Hair vs. hair" match	n/a
(c) – refers to the champion(s) heading into the match

== 1999 ==
WWC Anniversary 1999
- Promotion: World Wrestling Council
- Date: August 14, 1999
- City: Caguas, Puerto Rico
- Venue: Yldelfonso Sola Morales Stadium
- Attendance: 22,656

#	Results	Stipulations	Times
1	Blackboy beat Maelo Huertas (c) and El Rockero	"Triangle" match for the WWC Junior Heavyweight Championship	n/a
2	El Nene beat Jungle Jim Steele	Singles match	n/a
3	Brandi Alexander beat Malia Hosaka	Singles match	n/a
4	El Enjabanao Rabioso beat Bouncer Bob	Singles match	n/a
5	Jose Rivera Jr. and Sr. beat Victor the Bodyguard and Dutch Mantel	Tag team match	n/a
6	Atletico beat Angelo	Singles match	n/a
7	Carlos Colón pinned Ray Gonzalez (c)	WWC Universal Heavyweight Championship match, with Joe Cortez as special referee	n/a
8	Mustafa Saed beat Glamour Boy Shane (c)	Ladder match for the WWC Television Championship	n/a
9	Invader #1 beat Chicky Starr via DQ	Singles match	n/a
10	Invader #1 beat Invader del Milenio	Singles match	0:25
11	Abdullah the Butcher beat The Tower of Doom	"Lumberjacks with whips" match	n/a
(c) – refers to the champion(s) heading into the match

== 2000 ==
WWC Anniversary 2000
- Promotion: World Wrestling Council
- Date: July 16, 2000
- City: Caguas, Puerto Rico
- Venue: Yldelfonso Sola Morales Stadium

#	Results	Stipulations	Times
1	Rico Suave and Atletico beat Joe Don Smith and Gran Artache	Tag team match	n/a
2	El Bronco beat Invader III	Singles match	n/a
3	Tony Atlas beat Dutch Mantel	Singles match	n/a
4	Eddie Colón beat Jose Rivera, Jr. via DQ	Singles match	n/a
5	Invader I and Titan went to a double-DQ	Singles match	n/a
6	Octagoncito beat Pierrothito	Singles match	n/a
7	Barry and Kendall Windham beat The Public Enemy (Rocco Rock and Johnny Grunge)	Tag team match	n/a
8	Carlos Colón beat One Man Gang	Steel cage match	n/a
9	Carly Colón beat Rey Gonzales (c)	WWC Universal Heavyweight Championship match	n/a
10	Abdullah the Butcher beat Big Dick Dudley	Singles match	n/a
11	Thunder and Lightning beat The Pitbulls (#1 and #2)	Tag team match	n/a
(c) – refers to the champion(s) heading into the match

== 2001 ==
WWC Anniversary 2001
- Promotion: World Wrestling Council
- Date: September 8, 2001
- City: Bayamón, Puerto Rico
- Venue: Juan Ramon Loubriel Stadium

The 2001 event was nicknamed "Black September (Septiembre Negro)".

#	Results	Stipulations	Times
1	El Rockero, Mustafa Saed, and Enjabonao beat Rex King, Rico Suave, and Tahitian Warrior	3 vs 3 match	12:15
2	Bad Boy Bradley pinned Chris Grant (c)	WWC Television Championship match	n/a
3	Astro Man and El Bronco went to a double disqualification	Singles match	6:18
4	Carlos Colón beat Barrabas, Sr. via DQ	Singles match	5:17
5	Barrabas, Jr. pinned Eddie Colón	Singles match	7:41
6	Invader I pinned Fidel Sierra (c)	WWC Puerto Rican Championship match	10:53
7	Konnan (AAA Americas Heavyweight Champion) pinned The Barbarian	Singles match	n/a
8	Carly Colón and Rey Gonzales beat Thunder & Lightning	Tag team match	17:20
9	El Nene pinned Super Gladiator (c)	WWC Hardcore Championship match	12:17
10	Abdullah the Butcher beat Big Hail via DQ.	Singles match	6:53
(c) – refers to the champion(s) heading into the match

== 2002 ==
WWC Anniversary 2002
- Promotion: World Wrestling Council
- Date: September 14, 2002
- City: Bayamón, Puerto Rico
- Venue: Juan Ramon Loubriel Stadium

#	Results	Stipulations	Times
1	Brent Dail pinned Mr. Casanova	"Loser wears a dress" match	n/a
2	Sexy Marie pinned Ruben Pacino	Singles match	n/a
3	Super Gladiator II pinned Bronco	Singles match	n/a
4	Tommy Diablo beat Frankie Capone, Kid Romeo, and Damian Steele	"Four corners" match	n/a
5	Fidel Sierra and Ricky Santana beat Rico Suave and Wilfredo Alejandro	Tag team match	n/a
6	Carly Colón (WWC Universal Champion) beat Konnan via DQ	Singles match	8:35
7	Eddie Colón (WWC Junior Heavyweight Champion) beat Kid Kash (XWF Cruiserweight Champion) via DQ	Singles match	13:02
8	British Storm (XWF Heavyweight Champion) pinned Super Gladiator I	Singles match	9:36
9	Thunder and Lightning (WWC Tag Team Champions) vs Carlos Colón and Abdullah the Butcher went to a double-DQ	Tag team match	7:18
10	The Nasty Boys (Brian Knobbs and Jerry Sags) (XWF Tag Team Champions) beat Los Reggaetones	Tag team match	n/a

== 2003 ==
WWC Anniversary 2003
- Promotion: World Wrestling Council
- Date: July 19, 2003
- City: Carolina, Puerto Rico
- Venue: Coliseo Guillermo Angulo

#	Results	Stipulations	Times
1	Brent Dail and Rico Suave beat New York Hit Squad II and Marcus Falk	Tag team match	n/a
2	Vengador Boricua beat Chris Candido (c)	WWC Television Championship match	n/a
3	Jose Rivera, Jr. beat Alex Montalvo (c)	WWC Junior Heavyweight Championship match	n/a
4	Bronco I beat Victor Jovica	"Loser leaves town vs. company ownership" match	n/a
5	Fidel Sierra and Ricky Santana beat Broncos II and III (c)	WWC Tag Team Championship match	n/a
6	Pablo Márquez beat Diabolico	Singles match	n/a
7	Carly Colón beat Mike Awesome	Singles match	n/a
8	Eddie Colón beat Dominican Boy	"Stacy Colón's hair vs. mask" match	n/a
9	Carlos Colón defeated Abdullah the Butcher by countout	Singles match	n/a
10	Thunder versus Lightning went to a no contest	Singles match	n/a
(c) – refers to the champion(s) heading into the match

== 2004 ==
WWC Anniversary 2004
- Promotion: World Wrestling Council
- Date: August 21, 2004
- City: Caguas, Puerto Rico
- Venue: Yldelfonso Sola Morales Stadium

#	Results	Stipulations	Times
1	Kid Kash beat Maniac (c)	WWC Junior Heavyweight Championship match	n/a
2	Rico Suave beat Mike Youngblood	Singles match	n/a
3	El Cabellero Misterioso beat Dallas	Singles match	n/a
4	Vengador Boricua beat Super Gladiator	Singles match	n/a
5	Delta Force (c) beat Alex Montalvo and Chris Joel	WWC Tag Team Championship match	n/a
6	Chicky Starr beat Diabolico	Singles match	n/a
7	Eric Alexander pinned Abyss	Singles match	n/a
8	Abdullah the Butcher (WWC Universal Champion) defeated Nene by countout	Singles match	n/a
9	Huracan Castillo beat Bronco I via DQ	Singles match	n/a
10	Carly Colón pinned Eddie Colón	Singles match	30:00
(c) – refers to the champion(s) heading into the match

== 2005 ==
WWC Anniversary 2005
- Promotion: World Wrestling Council
- Date: November 5, 2005
- City: Bayamón, Puerto Rico
- Venue: Juan Ramon Loubriel Stadium

This event was dedicated to WWC legend Isaac Rosario.

#	Results	Stipulations	Times
1	"Mr.450" Hammett beat Chris Joel	Singles match	n/a
2	Genesis and Sexy Marie beat Lady Demonique and Sexy Juliette	Tag team match	n/a
3	Stefano beat Superstar Romeo (c)	WWC Junior Heavyweight Championship match	n/a
4	Gran Goliath beat Ash	Singles match	n/a
5	Derrick King and Stan Lee beat Vengador Boricua and Joe Bravo (c)	WWC World Tag Team Championship match	n/a
6	Abbad pinned Brent Dail (c)	WWC Puerto Rico Heavyweight Championship match	n/a
7	Rico Suave went to a no-contest vs Dr. Cesar Vargas	Singles match	n/a
8	El Bronco beat El Diamante	Singles match	n/a
9	Abdullah the Butcher pinned TNT(Anarchy)	Singles match	n/a
10	Bryan (WWC Universal Heavyweight Champion) pinned Eddie Colón	Singles match	n/a
11	Carlito beat Shane	Singles match	n/a
(c) – refers to the champion(s) heading into the match

== 2006 ==
WWC Anniversary 2006
- Promotion: World Wrestling Council
- Date: August 12, 2006
- City: Bayamón, Puerto Rico
- Venue: Pepin Cestero Court

This event was dedicated to Jose Rivera, Sr.

#	Results	Stipulations	Times
1	Jose Rivera, Jr. pinned Brent Dail (c)	WWC Junior Heavyweight Championship match	9:32
2	Fidel Sierra and Ricky Santana beat Hannibal and Jason X via disqualification	Singles match	12:17
3	Demonique and La Bella Carmen beat Black Rose and Genesis	Tag team match	9:53
4	Abbad vs Orlando Jordan went to a no-contest	Singles match	12:37
5	Chris Joel and Hurricane Castillo, Jr. beat Tim Arson and "Mr. Hardcore" Rico Suave	Singles match	n/a
6	Fire Blaze pinned Alex Montalvo	Singles match	9:56
7	Fire Blaze beat Victor Jovica via disqualification	Singles match	3:23
8	Bronco beat Eddie Colón via disqualification	Singles match	10:23
9	Bryan pinned Black Pain (c)	WWC Universal Heavyweight Championship match	14:07
10	Carlito pinned X-Pac	Singles match	12:39
(c) – refers to the champion(s) heading into the match

== 2007 ==
WWC Anniversary 2007
- Promotion: World Wrestling Council
- Date: July 13–14, 2007
- City: San Juan, Puerto Rico; Mayagüez, Puerto Rico
- Venue: Coliseo de Puerto Rico José Miguel Agrelot; Sports and Recreation Palace

The 2007 show was dedicated to Bruiser Brody. It consisted of two events. The first event took place at Coliseo de Puerto Rico José Miguel Agrelot in San Juan, Puerto Rico. The second event was held the following day at the Sports and Recreation Palace in Mayagüez, Puerto Rico.

#	Results	Stipulations	Times
1	Big Vito defeated Joey Mercury	Singles match	7:45
2	Barrabás, Jr. and Crazy Rudy defeated Huracán Castillo and Rico Suave	Tag team match	4:09
3	Eddie Colón and Christian Cage fought to a double countout	Singles match	16:14
4	Carlos Colón and Barrabás defeated Jose Estrada, Sr. and Victor Jovica	Legends match	9:22
5	Apolo (c) defeated Goldust	WWC Universal Heavyweight Championship match	7:04
6	Fidel Sierra and Ricky Santana declared co-winners	Bruiser Brody Cup Battle Royal	n/a
7	El Bronco defeated Fire Blaze to win his mask	Mask and Retirement vs. Retirement match	12:03
8	Sabu defeated Abyss	Hardcore match	8:01
9	Thunder and Lightning defeated Bryan and Black Pain	Tag team match	9:52
10	Carlito defeated Scott Hall	Singles match	8:33
(c) – refers to the champion(s) heading into the match

#	Results	Stipulations	Times
1	Big Vito vs. Abyss	Singles match	n/a
2	Chris Joel vs. El Bronco	Singles match	n/a
3	Big Vito vs. Bryan	Singles match	n/a
4	Big Vito vs. Bryan	Singles match	n/a
5	Ricky Santana and Fidel Sierra vs. Slam Shady and Voodooman	Tag team match	n/a
6	Noriega vs. Ash Rubinsky	Singles match	n/a
7	Thunder and Lightning vs. Abyss and Black Pain	Singles match	n/a
8	Christian Cage vs. Fire Blaze	Singles match	n/a
9	Carlos Colón, Crazy Rudy, Barrabás and Barrabás, Jr. vs. Victor Jovica, Jose Estrada, Sr., Huracán Castillo and Rico Suave	3 vs 3 tag team match	n/a
10	Eddie Colón vs. Sabu	Singles match	n/a
11	Razor Ramon defeated Carlito and Apolo (c)	Three Way Dance for the WWC Universal Heavyweight Championship	n/a
(c) – refers to the champion(s) heading into the match

== 2008 ==
WWC Anniversary 2008
- Promotion: World Wrestling Council
- Date: July 19, 2008
- City: San Juan, Puerto Rico
- Venue: Coliseo de Puerto Rico José Miguel Agrelot
- Attendance: Approximately 5,000

The event also featured a retirement ceremony of Carlos Colón, which featured Chicky Starr, Harley Race, Jose Rivera, Sr. and Abdullah the Butcher.

#	Results	Stipulations	Times
1	Eugene beat Steve Corino	Singles match	n/a
2	Los Gemelos D'Jours beat Texas Outlaws (c) (Todd Dean and Bad Boy Bradley)	WWC Tag Team Championship match	n/a
3	Eddie Colón beat Trevor Murdoch	Singles match	n/a
4	Shane Twins with Barrabas beat Thunder & Lightning	Tag team match	n/a
5	Bobby Lashley beat Rhino	Singles match	n/a
6	BJ beat Tommy Diablo, Rico Suave, Crazy Rudy, Fidel Sierra, Jose Rivera Jr. and Huracán Castillo Jr.	Open Challenge for WWC Puerto Rico Heavyweight Championship	n/a
7	Noriega defeated Orlando Colón	WWC Universal Heavyweight Championship Tournament	n/a
8	Ray Gonzalez pinned Carlito	Singles match	n/a
(c) – refers to the champion(s) heading into the match

== 2009 ==
WWC Anniversary 2009
- Promotion: World Wrestling Council
- Date: July 11, 2009
- City: Bayamón, Puerto Rico
- Venue: Rubén Rodríguez Coliseum
- Attendance: 9,000

The event was dedicated to former WWC and WWE announcer Hugo Savinovich, which featured Carlos Cabrera, Carlos Colon, and Joe Don Smith

#	Results	Stipulations	Times
1	El Sensacional Carlitos beat Johnny Styles, Tommy Diablo, Chicky Starr, Angel, Ricky Reyes and Hiram Tua	X Match for WWC Junior Heavyweight Championship	n/a
2	Idol Stevens (c) pinned Shane Sewell	Singles Match for WWC Puerto Rico Heavyweight Championship	n/a
3	Traci Brooks beat ODB	Singles match with Stacey Colon as Special Referee	n/a
4	El Bronco pinned Crazy Rudy	Singles match	n/a
5	Umaga beat Mr. Kennedy	Singles match	n/a
6	BJ pinned Steve Corino (c)	Single Match for WWC Universal Heavyweight Championship	n/a
7	Thunder and Lightning defeat The Colons (Eddie and Carlito)	Tag team match	n/a
8	Ray Gonzalez beat La Pesadilla	Mask vs Hair Match with Félix Trinidad as Special Referee	n/a
(c) – refers to the champion(s) heading into the match

== 2010 ==
WWC Anniversary 2010
- Promotion: World Wrestling Council
- Date: July 9 2010 July 10 2010 July 11, 2010
- City: Aguadilla, Puerto Rico, Ponce, Puerto Rico, Bayamón, Puerto Rico,
- Venue: Coliseo Luis T. Díaz de Aguadilla, Coliseo Salvador Dijols de la Playa de Ponce, Rubén Rodríguez Coliseum
- Attendance: Approximately 4,000

This event was dedicated to the memory of Pedro Huracan Castillo. The event was celebrated in Coliseo Ruben Rodriguez at Bayamon, also two other shows were celebrated in Aguadilla and Ponce before the main night in Bayamon. Tommy Dreamer and Daizee Haze were present in Ponce & Aguadilla.

#	Results	Stipulations	Times
1	Chris Joel defeated Joe Don Smith, Lynx, El Niche, Los Gemelos D'Jours, Rikochet, Angel and Tommy Diablo	Puerto Rico Open Challenge: To select number one contender for Puerto Rico's belt.	n/a
2	Hiram Tua defeated Noriega	n/a	n/a
3	Black Pain defeated Tony Atlas	Special Challenge	n/a
4	Shelton Benjamin defeated Primo Colon	n/a	n/a
5	Mickie James pinned ODB	Diva vs Knockout	n/a
6	Ray Gonzalez defeated Scott Steiner	WWC Universal Heavyweight Championship match with Ricky Banderas as Special Referee	n/a
7	Orlando Colon beat El Sensacional Carlitos (c)	Puerto Rico Heavyweight Championship	n/a
8	Thunder & Lightning defeated Abbad & Idol Stevens (c), and El Fenomeno Illegal (BJ & Chicano)	WWC Tag Team Championship	n/a
9	Carlito defeated Orlando Colon by countout; Booker T vs. Carlito saw no winner as the official referee was knocked out; Banderas defeated Carlito after he revealed himself as the third opponent	Three faces of death match	n/a
(c) – refers to the champion(s) heading into the match

== 2011 ==
WWC Anniversary 2011
- Promotion: World Wrestling Council
- Date: July 15, 2011; July 16, 2011
- City: Bayamón, Puerto Rico; Ponce, Puerto Rico
- Venue: Coliseo Ruben Rodriguez; Auditorio Pachin Vicens
- Attendance: Approximately 8,000 at Bayamon

This event was dedicated to former WWC Universal Champion Hercules Ayala. This event was the start of an invasion angle of IWA (rival promotion) which soon after was cancelled:

#	Results	Stipulations	Times
1	El Invader #1 and El Sensacional Carlitos defeated "The Precious One" Gilbert and Chicky Starr	Tag team match	n/a
2	Carlito and Eddie Colon defeated Abyss and El Bufalo Bison	Tag team match	n/a
3	Black Pain defeated Mr. Big	Single Match	n/a
4	Lynx and El Niche (c) defeated Chavo Guerrero and Orlando Colon	WWC Tag Team Championship	n/a
5	Sarita defeated Black Rose	Single Match	n/a
6	Joe Bravo and Noriega defeated BJ and Shane The Glamour Boy	Tag Team Match	n/a
7	Madman Manson defeated Mr. X	Single Match	n/a
8	Rikochet defeated "Mr. San Juan" Tommy Diablo (c)	WWC Junior Heavyweight Championship	n/a
9	AJ Castillo and El Cuervo defeated Chris Joel and Steve Joel	Tag team Match	n/a
(c) – refers to the champion(s) heading into the match

#	Results	Stipulations	Times
1	El Invader #1 vs "The Precious One" Gilbert went to a no-contest	Single match	n/a
2	Carlito (c) defeated Abyss	WWC Universal Heavyweight Championship	n/a
3	Thunder & Lightning (as IWA members) vs Lynx & El Niche (c) went to a no-contest. After the match ended Savio Vega along with several IWA roster stars and Thunder & Lightning attacked the champions Lynx & El Niche	WWC Tag Team Championship with Two Referees	n/a
4	Chavo Guerrero Jr. defeated El Sensacional Carlitos (c) and Orlando Colon	Triple Threat Match for the Caribbean championship	n/a
5	Shane The Glamour Boy defeated Noriega	Hair vs. hair match	n/a
6	Black Rose defeated Sarita	Single Match	n/a
7	Mad Man Manson won the Championship Scramble	Money In The Bank type elimination match where the winner could challenge any champion for their belt.	n/a
8	Joe Bravo defeated BJ	Single Match	n/a
9	Mr. Big defeated Black Pain	Single Match	n/a
(c) – refers to the champion(s) heading into the match

== 2012 ==
WWC Anniversary 2012
- Promotion: World Wrestling Council
- Date: June 29, 2012 June 30, 2012 July 1, 2012
- City: Ponce, Puerto Rico, Bayamón, Puerto Rico; San Germán, Puerto Rico
- Venue: Auditorio Pachin Vicens; Coliseo Rubén Rodríguez; Coliseo Arquelio Torres Ramírez
- Attendance: Approximately 7,000

This event was dedicated to The Invaders, Jose Huertas (1), Roberto Soto (2), Johnny Rivera (3) and Maelo Huertas (4). The event was held at Auditorio Juan Pachín Vicens in Ponce, Coliseo Ruben Rodriguez in Bayamon and Coliseo Arquelio Torres Ramírez in San Germán.

#	Results	Stipulations	Times
1	Ray González and Carlito defeat Thunder & Lightning	Mask vs Hair Match with El Invader as Referee	n/a
2	Apolo defeat The Precious One Gilbert (c)	WWC Universal Heavyweight Championship	n/a
3	"Los Arcangeles" (Tommy Diablo and Cuervo) (c) beat Diabolico and Angel	WWC Tag Team Championship	n/a
4	Primo & Epico pinned Shelton Benjamin and John Morrison	Tag Team Match	n/a
5	Romeo defeat Chris Joel	Single Match	n/a
6	Melina beat Velvet Sky	Single Match	n/a
7	Chicky Starr, Xix Xavant, Jay Velez & Bolo The Red Bulldog defeat Orlando Toledo, CK Clemente & The Patriots	El Nuevo Mando vs Starr Corporation	n/a
8	Chris Angel pinned Davey Richards	Single Match	n/a
9	The Invaders pinned Mr. X & Masked Man	Tag Team Match	n/a
(c) – refers to the champion(s) heading into the match

== 2013 ==
This event was dedicated to former WWWF (WWE) World Heavyweight Champion Pedro Morales. The event was held at Coliseo Rubén Rodríguez in Bayamón. This was a pay-per-view event.

WWC Anniversary 2013
- Promotion: World Wrestling Council
- Date: September 21, 2013
- City: Bayamón, Puerto Rico
- Venue: Rubén Rodríguez Coliseum

#	Results	Stipulations	Times
1	Chris Angel (c) w/José Chaparro pinned Apolo	WWC Universal Heavyweight Championship	n/a
2	Rey Fenix defeated Super Fenix	"Mask vs. mask" match with Orlando Toledo as Special Guest Referee	n/a
3	Chicano & Abbad (c) beat Thunder & Lightning and Sons of Samoa	Three Way Dance for WWC Tag Team Championship	n/a
4	Rikochet (c) defeated Tommy Diablo	WWC Junior Heavyweight Championship	n/a
5	Andy Leavine beat Samson Walker		n/a
6	Carlos Colon & Stacy Colon defeated El Invader & La Tigresa	Mixed Tag Team Match	n/a
7	Savio Vega beat El Bronco (c) by DQ	WWC Puerto Rico Heavyweight Championship	n/a
8	Sting defeated Carlito	Singles match	n/a
(c) – refers to the champion(s) heading into the match

== 2014 ==
This event was dedicated to Chicky Starr. The event was held at Coliseo Héctor Sola Bezares in Caguas, Puerto Rico. This was a pay-per-view event.

WWC Anniversary 2014
- Promotion: World Wrestling Council
- Date: October 24, 2014 October 25, 2014
- City: Ponce, Puerto Rico, Caguas, Puerto Rico
- Venue: Estadio Paquito Montaner Coliseo Héctor Sola Bezares

#	Results	Stipulations	Times
1	Rey González defeated Hernandez w/ Ricardo Rodriguez	Singles match	n/a
2	Los Templarios (c) w/Juan Manuel Ortega beat Los Matadores w/ El Torito	WWC Tag Team Championship	n/a
3	Mighty Ursus (c) defeated Carlito Caribbean Cool	WWC Universal Title	n/a
4	Chicano beat "The Precious One" Gilbert (c)	WWC Puerto Rico Championship	n/a
5	AJ, Ricochet, Angel Cotto & Xix Xavant defeated David Montes, Samuel Adams, Bouncer Bob & Bouncer Bruno	8 man tag team match	n/a
6	Miguel Perez beat Huracan Castillo by DQ	Hardcore Match	n/a
7	Mike Mendoza defeated Slash Venom	Singles match	n/a
8	Pelayito Vazquez beat Angel Fashion w/ Vanilla Vargas	Singles match	n/a
9	Invader #1 Vs. El Bronco finished in a double disqualification	Grudge Match	n/a
(c) – refers to the champion(s) heading into the match

== 2015 ==
The event was dedicated to Jose Miguel Perez Sr., The event was held at Complejo Ferial de Ponce, Coliseo Ruben Rodríguez in Bayamon, Puerto Rico and Coliseo José “Buga” Abreu

WWC Anniversary 2015
- Promotion: World Wrestling Council
- Date: September 25, 2015 September 26, 2015 September 27, 2015
- City: Ponce, Puerto Rico, Bayamón, Puerto Rico, Isabela, Puerto Rico
- Venue: Complejo Ferial de Ponce, Rubén Rodríguez Coliseum, Coliseo José “Buga” Abreu

#	Results	Stipulations	Times
1	Tommy Diablo defeats Peter The Bad Romance (c)	WWC World Junior Heavyweight Championship	n/a
2	Angel Fashion(with Vanilla Vargas) defeats Mike Mendoza	Lumberjack Match with straps	n/a
3	Joe Bravo defeats Samson Walker	Singles Match	n/a
4	Ray González Jr. defeats La Revolución I (c)	WWC Puerto Rico Heavyweight Championship	n/a
5	Mighty Ursus (with Juan Manuel Ortega) defeats Tommy Dreamer	Hardcore Match	n/a
6	The Match between Apolo and Chicano finish in a No Contest.	Single Match	n/a
7	La Revolución (with Orlando “Pretty Boy” Toledo) (c) defeats The Sons of Samoa (with Chicky Starr)	WWC World Tag Team Championship	n/a
8	Mr.450 (c) defeats Carlito	“Jaula de la Muerte” Match for the WWC Universal Heavyweight Championship with Ray González as special guest referee.	
(c) – refers to the champion(s) heading into the match

== 2016 ==
The event was dedicated posthumously to former Canadian professional wrestler and WWC wrestler Pierre Martel. The event was held at: Humacao Arena (October 14), Cancha Jose Pepin Cesteros in Bayamon (October 15), Palacio de Recreación y Deportes in Mayaguez (October 16)

WWC Anniversary 43
- Promotion: World Wrestling Council
- Date: October 14 (Humacao) October 15 (Bayamon) October 16 (Mayagüez)
- City: Humacao, Puerto Rico, Bayamón, Puerto Rico, Mayagüez, Puerto Rico
- Venue: Humacao Arena (Oct. 14) Coliseo Pepin Cesteros Bayamon (Oct. 15) Palacio Recreación y Deportes Mayagüez (Oct. 16)

October 15 (Cancha Jose Pepín Cestero de Bayamon)

#	Results	Stipulations
1	Angel Cotto defeated Angel Fashion, Tommy Diablo, Engel, OT Fernández and Jaycobs (c)	WWC World Junior Heavyweight Championship Battle Royal
2	Thunder & Lightning defeated El Diabólico and Peter The Bad Romance	Tag Team Match
3	Black Paindefeated Mighty Ursus	Single Match
4	Ray González Jr. defeated El Hijo de Dos Caras	Single Match
5	Mike Mendoza defeated El Cuervo	Singles Match
6	Chicano (c) defeated Mr. 450	WWC Puerto Rico Heavyweight Championship
7	The Shining Stars (Primo and Epico) defeated La Revolución	Tag Team Match
8	Carlito (c) defeated Jeff Hardy	WWC Universal Heavyweight Championship
9	Alberto Del Rio defeated Ray González	“La Jaula de la Muerte” Match
(c) – refers to the champion(s) heading into the match

== 2017 ==
The World Wrestling Council did not held the WWC Aniversario in 2017 due to the wake of Hurricane María thru Puerto Rico.

== 2018 ==
WWC Anniversary 45
- Promotion: World Wrestling Council
- Date: July 13 (Manatí) July 14 (Guaynabo) July 15 (Ponce)
- City: Manatí, Puerto Rico Guaynabo, Puerto Rico Ponce, Puerto Rico
- Venue: Acrópolis de Manatí (Jul. 13) Cancha Mario Quijote Morales (Jul. 14) Auditorio Pachin Vicents (Jul. 15)

July 14 (Cancha Mario Quijote Morales, Guaynabo, Puerto Rico)

#	Results	Stipulations
1	Barreto defeated Dimes	Singles Match
2	Xix Xavant defeated Peter the Bad Romance	Singles Match
3	OT Fernandez y Jaycobs defeated Khaos y Abbadon	Tag Team Match
4	Bellito (c) retained the WWC TV Championship against Anarchy	Singles Match for the WWC Television Championship
5	Chicano defeated El Hijo de Dos Caras	Singles Match
6	La Revolución (c) defeated The Precious One Gilbert and Ray González Jr.	Tag Team Match for the WWC World Tag Team championship
7	Thunder & Lightning defeated The Briscoe Brothers	tag team match
8	The Mighty Ursus (c) retained the WWC Universal Championship against Primo Colon	Singles Match for the WWC Universal Championship
9	Alberto Del Rio defeated Ray González	Singles match
10	Jack Swagger (w/ Dutch Mantell) defeated Carlito Caribbean Cool	Singles match
(c) – refers to the champion(s) heading into the match

== 2019 ==
August 17 (Cancha Mario Quijote Morales, Guaynabo, Puerto Rico). The event was dedicated to former WWC Universal Champion Dutch Mantell

WWC Anniversary 46
- Promotion: World Wrestling Council
- Date: August 16 (Hatillo) August 17 (Guaynabo) August 18 (San Germán)
- Venue: Coliseo Francisco Deida (August 16) Coliseo Mario Quijote Morales (August 17) San Germán (August 18)

#	Results	Stipulations
1	Carlito defeats Eli Drake	Single Match
2	Black Rose defeats Desi Derata	Single Match
3	La Revolución defeats Clan Freedom, La Fórmula, La Potencia y Doom Patrol (c	Elimination/tag team match for the WWC World Tag Team Championship
4	Eddie Colón defeats Noriega	Singles Match
5	Zcion RT1 (c) defeats Crazy Luis, Guevara, Jovan, Super Gladiador and Violencia	Bronca Boricua Match for the WWC Television Championship
6	Chicano defeats Xavant	Street Fight
7	Bellito Calderón (c) defeats Pedro Portillo III	WWC Puerto Rico Heavyweight Championship
8	Orlando Colón defeats The Precious One Gilbert (c) with Special referee Ray Gonzalez	Single match for the WWC Universal Championship
(c) – refers to the champion(s) heading into the match

== 2022 ==
WWC Aniversario 49 was held on August 6, 2022, after the event was cancelled for two years due to COVID-19 restrictions. The event took place at Coliseo Rubén Rodríguez in Bayamón and was dedicated to Huracan Castillo Jr.

WWC Anniversary 2022
- Promotion: World Wrestling Council
- Date: August 6, 2022
- City: Bayamón, Puerto Rico
- Venue: Rubén Rodríguez Coliseum
- Attendance: 5,000

#	Results	Stipulations
1	Androide 787 defeats Emil Roy (c), Jovan and Pablo Márquez	For the WWC World Junior Heavyweight Championship
2	El Gran Armando defeats Makabro	Single match
3	La Seguridad de Dynasty (c) defeats La Revolución	For the WWC World Tag team Championship
4	Gigante Nihan (c) defeats Black Pain	Single match for the WWC Puerto Rico Championship
5	Ray Gonzalez defeats The Precious One Gilbert	Singles Match the winner is the chief of operations of WWC
6	Damian Sandow defeats Doc Gallows	Single match
7	Huracan Castillo Jr. defeats Joe Bravo (with Su Majestad El Profe)	Hardcore Match
8	Mike Nice (c) defeats Bryan Idol	Singles Match for the WWC Television Championship
9	Intelecto 5 Estrellas defeats Primo Colon and Xix Xavant (c)	Triple Threat Match for the WWC Universal Championship
10	Carlito defeats Andrade El Idolo w/Ric Flair with Ray Gonzalez as special guest referee	Single match

== 2023 ==
This edition of the annual WWC Aniversario show marked the 50th anniversary of the World Wrestling Council. The event was held on June 24, 2023, at Coliseo Rubén Rodríguez in Bayamón Puerto Rico. It was dedicated to Carlos Colón, Victor Jovica, Gorilla Monsoon, Gil Hayes, Miguel Pérez, Huracan Castillo Sr., Joaquin Padín, Jr, Rickin Sánchez and the Puerto Rican fans.

WWC Anniversary 2023
- Promotion: World Wrestling Council
- Date: June 24, 2023
- City: Bayamón, Puerto Rico
- Venue: Rubén Rodríguez Coliseum
- Attendance: Approximately 8,000

#	Results	Stipulations
1	Jovan defeats Brandon (c) and Diego Luna	Kickoff For the WWC World Junior Heavyweight Championship
2	El Informante & Sr. Anthony defeated Pulli & JC Jexx	Kickoff Tag team match
3	Los Inmortales defeats Makabro & Androide 787 and La Seguridad de El Nuevo Orden	Kickoff 3-way tag team match
4	Amazona y Yaide defeated Vanilla Vargas y Ashley D’Amboise	Kickoff Women Tag team match
5	The Precious One Gilbert (c) defeats Nihan	Final of the Tournament for the WWC Caribbean title
6	Chicano wins over Black Pain, Pablo Márquez, Hardcore Mitchell, Will Kalagan, El Bacano, Diabólico, Joe Don Smith and Willie Jay Vélez.	Abdullah the Butcher Cup battle royal
7	Xavant defeats Slash Venom	Single Match
8	Mike Nice (c) defeats El Bronco #1	WWC Puerto Rico Championship
9	Ray González defeats Eddie Colón	For the position of Director of Operations of WWC with Hugo Savinovich and Su Majestad El Profe as special guests referees
10	Thunder & Lightning defeats La Revolución	Tag Team match
11	Intelecto 5 Estrellas (c) defeats Carlito	WWC Universal Heavyweight Championship
12	Chicky Starr defeats Gallo The Producer	Single match
(c) – refers to the champion(s) heading into the match

== 2024 ==
WWC Aniversario 51 was held on August 31, 2024, The event took take place at Coliseo Rubén Rodríguez in Bayamón. This aniversario show was dedicated to Shane The Glamour Boy.

WWC Anniversary 2024
- Promotion: World Wrestling Council
- Date: August 31, 2024
- City: Bayamón, Puerto Rico
- Venue: Rubén Rodríguez Coliseum
- Attendance: 7,412

#	Results	Stipulations
1	Jovan defeated Diego Luna	Kickoff Single match
2	Elena Negroni defeated Akire	Kickoff Single match
3	El Informante#2 defeated JC Jexx	Kickoff Single match
4	Julio Jimenez defeated Amadeo Sole	Kickoff Single match
5	Makabro defeated Brandon The Skater	Kickoff Single match
6	Los Inmortales defeated La Seguridad	Kickoff Tag Team match
7	Mascarita Dorada & Beautiful Bobbie Jo defeated Mini Charly Manson & Shytayla	Mini match with Jordy Berlanga as special guest referee
8	Stephanie Amalbert defeated Jazzy Yang and Amazona	Three Way Dance for the WWC Women's Championship
9	Joe Anthony defeated El Informante (c)	WWC World Junior Heavyweight Championship
10	Mike Nice defeated Zcion RT1 (c) for disqualification	WWC Television Championship
11	Ryan Nemeth defeatedJimmy Wang Yang	Single Match
12	Eddie Colón defeated Ray González Jr.	Street Fight
13	Chicano defeated Tony Leyenda	Single Match
14	Ray González (with Carlos Colón) defeated Intelecto 5 Estrellas (c) (with Eddie Colón)	No Disqualification Match for WWC Universal Heavyweight Championship with Shane The Glamour Boy as special guest referee
15	Mr. Big & Lightning defeated Black Pain & Nihan (c)	WWC World Tag Team Championship
16	Xavant (c) defeated The Precious One Gilbert	TLC Unification Match for WWC Puerto Rico Championship and WWC Caribbean Heavyweight Championship
17	Alberto Del Rio (c) defeated Nic Nemeth	AAA Mega Championship
(c) – refers to the champion(s) heading into the match

== 2025 ==
WWC Aniversario 52 was held on August 30, 2025. The event took place at Coliseo Rubén Rodríguez in Bayamón. This aniversario show was posthumously dedicated to Rico Suave.

#	Results	Stipulations
1	Oly Jr. defeats Lou Forza	Dark Match
2	Jota Jota “El Insociable” defeats Manny The Bodyguard Jr.	Dark Match
2	Chupi Hunter defeats Diego Luna	Dark Match
3	Jovan defeats Pablo Marquez	Dark Match
4	Amazona defeats Kamila	Dark Match
5	Chupi Hunter defeats Diego Luna	Dark Match
6	Amaddeo Solé (c) defeats Makabro	Dark Match for the WWC Television Championship
7	Oscar Benabe defeats El Informante (with El Informante #2)	Single Match
8	The Party Animal Brandon defeats JC Jexx (c)	With fans surrounding the ring with leather straps for the WWC World Junior Heavyweight Championship
9	Elena Negroni (c) defeats Stephany Amalbert	WWC Women's Championship with La Reina Habana as special guest referee
9	La Revolución (c) (with Orlando “Pretty Boy” Toledo) defeat Mike Nice & Mr. Big (with Joe Don Smith)	Tag Team Match for the WWC World Tag Team Championship where Orlando “Pretty Boy” Toledo will be handcuffed to a mysterious veteran wrestler
10	Joe Anthony defeats Tony Leyenda (c) and El Hijo de Dos Caras	Triple Threat Match for the WWC Puerto Rico Championship
11	Nick Mercer defeats Zcion RT1 (c) (with Orlando “Pretty Boy” Toledo)	Extreme Rules Match for the WWC Caribbean Championship
12	Gilbert & Lightning defeat The Good Brothers (Doc Gallows & Karl Anderson)	Tag Team Match
13	Alberto Del Rio vs. El León Apolo - No Contest	Clash of Nations
14	Ray González defeats Eddie Colón (with Intelecto 5 Estrellas)	Retirement Vs. Retirement Match with Pelayito Vazquez & Orlando “Pretty Boy” Toledo as special guest referees
15	Xavant defeats Chicano (c) and Matt Hardy and Carlito	Fatal Four Way Match for the WWC Universal Championship
(c) – refers to the champion(s) heading into the match

== 2026 ==
WWC Aniversario 53 was held on June 27, 2026 and June 28, 2026. The event took place at the Roberto Clemente Coliseum in San Juan, Puerto Rico and at the Salvador Dijols Coliseum in Ponce, Puerto Rico. This event was dedicated to former three-time WWC Women's Champion Sol Vargas (La Tigresa).

WWC Anniversary 53
- Promotion: World Wrestling Council
- Date: June 27, 2026 June 28, 2026
- City: San Juan, Puerto Rico Ponce, Puerto Rico
- Venue: Roberto Clemente Coliseum Salvador Dijols Coliseum

#	Results	Stipulations
1	El Hostil Jovan (c) defeated Dragón Yuki	Dark Match For the WWC World Junior Heavyweight Championship
2	Elena Negroni & El Diabólico defeated Stephanie Amalbert & Macabro	Dark Match With Kamila as special guest referee
3	JC Jexx & Diego Luna defeated Hermanos Estrellas	Dark Match Tag team match
4	David Guevara & JP (La Seguridad) defeated Los Gemelos Fortuna	Dark Match Tag team match
5	El Paparazzi defeated Joe Bravo	With fans surrounding the ring with leather straps
6	Amazona (with La Tigresa) defeats Natalya Markova (c)	WWC Women’s Championship
7	Los Matadores Celestiales (c) defeated Lou Forza & Amadeo Sole	WWC World Tag Team Championship
8	El Informante defeated Pelayo Vázquez	If Pelayo loses, he will be suspended as a referee for 90 days and Orlando Toledo will be the special referee
9	Lynx defeated El Hijo de Dos Caras,Lightning y Bryan Idol (c)	WWC Television Championship
10	Xavant (c) defeated Alberto Del Rio	WWC Puerto Rico Championship
11	John Hawkins (c) defeated Jake Hager	WWC Caribbean Championship
12	Chicano y La Amenaza Bryan defeated Carlito y Eddie Colón	Extreme Rules Dumpster Match
13	Zcion RT1 vence a Intelecto 5 Estrellas (c)	Locked in the Cage of Death for the WWC Universal Championship
14	Orlando Colón defeated a Ray González	Singles match
(c) – refers to the champion(s) heading into the match

== See also ==
- Professional wrestling in Puerto Rico
