= Hercules Ayala =

Puerto Rican professional wrestler (1950–2020)

Personal information
- Born: Ruben Cruz; July 14, 1950 Bayamón, Puerto Rico
- Died: January 22, 2020 (aged 69) St. Albert, Alberta, Canada
- Spouse: Susan Cruz
- Children: 3

Professional wrestling career
- Ring name(s): El Sansón Boricua; Crusher Ayala; Hercules Ayala; Hercules Cortez; Ruben Ayala; Wild Bull Ayala
- Billed height: 6 ft 1 in (185 cm)
- Billed weight: 265 lb (120 kg)
- Trained by: Angelo Savoldi
- Debut: 1970
- Retired: 2004

Ruben Cruz (July 14, 1950 – January 22, 2020) was a Puerto Rican professional wrestler, better known by his ring name Hercules Ayala. He competed in Canadian and international wrestling promotions including the eastern Canadian Grand Prix Wrestling, the Calgary-based Stampede Wrestling, New Japan Pro-Wrestling in Japan and World Wrestling Council in Puerto Rico.

== Professional wrestling career ==
Born in Bayamón, Puerto Rico, Ayala was a fan of professional wrestling and admired Huracan Castillo. During the early-1970s, he traveled to the United States several months after his mother had left to live with her daughter and her grandchildren in Boston, Massachusetts. While living in Boston, Cruz met former National Wrestling Alliance wrestler Angelo Savoldi working out at a local gym. After undergoing training with Savoldi, he was able to compete for the then World Wide Wrestling Federation from 1974 to 1975 as Ruben Ayala.

In December 1976, Ayala and tag team partner Victor Jovica won the NWA North American Tag Team Championship (Puerto Rico/WWC version) from Heigo Hamaguchi and Gordon Nelson. In 1977, Cruz met Bret Hart and the Dynamite Kid in Germany, and they introduced him to Stu Hart. Cruz worked in Canada for eight years. In Hart's Stampede Wrestling, Cruz held the Stampede International Tag Team Championship with Jim Neidhart. In addition to Stampede, he wrestled for Lutte Internationale. In January 1987, he defeated David Shultz for the Canadian International Heavyweight Championship, but lost it to Abdullah the Butcher approximately one month later.

After returning to Puerto Rico, he began working for the Capital Sports Promotion (later renamed to World Wrestling Council). He feuded with Killer Tim Brooks, Kevin Sullivan and Hercules Hernandez. In March 1985, he defeated Randy Savage to win the WWC North American Heavyweight Championship. He also wrestled Ric Flair for the NWA title. In the summer of 1987 Ayala suggested to the WWC office that he turn heel after years working as a babyface. He feuded with Carlos Colon over the WWC Universal Heavyweight Title and hired Chicky Starr as his manager. His feud with Carlos Colon reached its peak when Ayala attacked Nancy Coates, Carlos Colon's wife, at a WWC banquet award ceremony. On January 6, 1989, he lost a loser leaves town match to Colon and disappeared from the territory.

In 1992, he worked as booker in Puerto Rico for the American Wrestling Federation, where he reunited with manager Chicky Starr and was the AWF champion until he lost the championship to Huracán Castillo Jr.

Between 1995 and 1996, he made some appearances at the World Wrestling Council and feuded against Bronco l.

In 2011, Hercules Ayala returned to the World Wrestling Council and dedicated the 2011 WWC Anniversary Card to him.

He was also inducted to the Prairie Wrestling Alliance Hall of Fame.

== Personal life ==
Cruz met his wife Susan while he was wrestling in Canada. They had two daughters together, and Cruz had a son from a previous relationship . After retiring from professional wrestling, Cruz settled in St. Albert, Alberta, and worked for a fencing company. He is the godfather to fellow wrestler Ángel Acevedo's daughter. He died on January 22, 2020 at age 69.

== Championships and accomplishments ==
- Americas Wrestling Federation
  - AWF World Heavyweight Championship (1 time)
- Big Time Wrestling
  - NWA World Tag Team Championship (1 time) – with Ali Mustafa
- Canadian Wrestling Hall of Fame
  - Class of 2012
- European Wrestling Union
  - World Super Heavyweight Championship (1 time)
- Lutte Internationale
  - Canadian International Heavyweight Championship (1 time)
- Prairie Wrestling Alliance
  - PWA Hall of Fame - 2008
- Stampede Wrestling
  - Stampede International Tag Team Championship (1 time) – with Jim Neidhart
- World Wrestling Council
  - WWC Caribbean Heavyweight Championship (2 times)
  - WWC North American Heavyweight Championship (1 time)
  - WWC North American Tag Team Championship (1 time) – with Victor Jovica
  - WWC Puerto Rico Heavyweight Championship (5 times)
  - WWC World Junior Heavyweight Championship (3 times)
  - WWC World Tag Team Championship (1 time) – with King Tonga
  - WWC Universal Heavyweight Championship (3 times)
- American World Promotions
  - AWP Caribbean Tag Team Championship (1 time) - with Chicky Starr
