= Invader II =

Puerto Rican professional wrestler (born 1948)

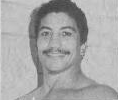
- Soto, c. 1981

Personal information
- Born: Roberto Soto; September 12, 1948 (age 77) Vega Baja, Puerto Rico

Professional wrestling career
- Ring name(s): Invader II; Roberto Soto; Pepe Perez; Avenger
- Billed height: 5 ft 11 in (1.80 m)
- Billed weight: 214 lb (97 kg)
- Debut: 1969
- Retired: 2004

Roberto Soto (born September 12, 1948) is a Puerto Rican professional wrestler, better known by his ring name, Invader II. Soto was one-half of the tag team "The Invaders" with Invader I.

== Professional wrestling career ==
Although competing primarily in the Puerto Rican-based World Wrestling Council with José González, Soto would also wrestle in the World Wrestling Federation, International World Class Championship Wrestling, and Continental Championship Wrestling during the 1980s.

In 1988, he was among those present when wrestler Bruiser Brody was stabbed to death by Soto's tag team partner González while at a WWC event in San Juan, Puerto Rico and interpreted for American wrestlers after police officers arrived on the scene.

Competing in Japan during the 1990s, he would later return to the WWC teaming with Invader III in a feud against González . However, their alliance was short-lived, with Soto eventually defeating Invader III in a mask vs. mask match at WWC Anniversary on August 1, 1998.

== Championships and accomplishments ==
- Americas Wrestling Federation

- AWF World Tag Team Championship (1 time) - with Invader IV

- Continental Championship Wrestling
  - NWA Alabama Heavyweight Championship (1 time)
  - NWA Continental Heavyweight Championship (1 time)
  - NWA Gulf Coast Tag Team Championship (1 time) - with Ramón Pérez
  - NWA Wrestle Birmingham Heavyweight Championship (1 time)
- Central States Wrestling
  - NWA Central States Heavyweight Championship (1 time)
- Georgia Championship Wrestling
  - NWA Southeastern Tag Team Championship (Georgia version) (4 times) - with Argentina Apollo (1), Bob Armstrong (2) and Tim Woods (1)
  - NWA Southeastern Heavyweight Championship (1 time)
  - NWA Macon Tag Team Championship (2 times) - with Cyclone (1) and Tom Jones (1)
- NWA Gulf Coast
  - NWA Gulf Coast Louisiana Championship (1 time)
- NWA San Francisco
  - NWA World Tag Team Championship (San Francisco version) (2 times) - with Invader I (2)
- NWA Wildside
  - NWA Wildside Heavyweight Championship (1 time)
- World Wrestling Council
  - WWC North American Tag Team Championship (1 time) - with Invader I
  - WWC World Tag Team Championship (2 times) - with Invader I
  - WWC Junior Heavyweight Championship (1 time)
  - WWC Caribbean Tag Team Championship (1 time) - Invader IV (1)
- Universal Wrestling Promotions
  - UWP Caribbean Tag Team Championship (1 time) - Invader I (1)
- L&G Promotions
  - L&G Caribbean Heavyweight Championship (2 times)
- Pro Wrestling Illustrated

- PWI ranked him # 257 of the 500 best singles wrestlers of the PWI 500 in 1998

== See also ==
- Professional wrestling in Puerto Rico
