= Rico Suave (wrestler) =

Puerto Rican professional wrestler and manager (1970–2025)

Personal information
- Born: Julio Domingo Estrada Caceres; July 4, 1970 Humacao, Puerto Rico
- Died: March 20, 2025 (aged 54) Vero Beach, Florida, U.S.
- Parent: José Estrada Sr. (father)
- Relative: José Estrada Jr. (brother)

Professional wrestling career
- Ring name(s): Extranjero Misterioso; Crazy Sheik; Mr. Hardcore Rico Suave; Rico Suave; Cobra; Fabulous Boy; El Indio Taino; Julio Domingo Estrada Cáceres; Julio Estrada; Mr. PNP; Super Médico #4; Solid Gold 14k
- Billed height: 6 ft 0 in (1.83 m)
- Billed weight: 275 lb (125 kg)
- Trained by: Divino Tony; José Estrada Sr.
- Debut: 1984
- Retired: 2024

Julio Domingo Estrada Caceres (July 4, 1970 – March 20, 2025), better known as Rico Suave, was a Puerto Rican professional wrestler and manager. He was best known for his 18-year run in the World Wrestling Council promotion.

== Career ==
Estrada started training to become a wrestler at age 14 and made his debut in 1984 wrestling under various names mostly at independent shows in east of Puerto Rico. Teamed with Solid Gold #1 which was his father José Estrada Sr. former WWF, WWE wrestler in 1991 in the Americas Wrestling Federation in Puerto Rico. He left the company to enter WWC in 1992, where he worked with his brother Jose Estrada Jr. and later in 1993 he became the top manager in the company that year when Joe Don Smith left to play for the then-expansion team Colorado Rockies so Estrada took his spot and managed various wrestlers like Greg Valentine, Dick Murdoch, Eddie Gilbert, Kane, Buddy Landell, Mabel, Val Venis, Glamour Boy Shane, Abdullah the Butcher, Ray Gonzalez, El Nene, Rex King, El Diamante, La Tigresa, Victor The Bodyguard, Jesus Castillo, "Jungle" Jim Steele, Chicky Starr and others. Feuded with Carlos Colon on and off for many years.

He had a memorable feud with Antonio Pantojas (not to be confused with the actor of the same name) known as El Profe that lasted a long time during the 90s.

In 1998, he also was the leader of Invasion Azteca, which was a Mexican group that came to invade WWC combined by Pierroth, Jr., Jerry Estrada, Villano III and the late El Texano. Estrada spoke with a Mexican accent and used a Serape during that angle.

Estrada toured Japan in 2000 where he competed at Big Japan Pro Wrestling known as Crazy Sheik.

By 2003, Estrada became a good guy after twelve years working in WWC as a Heel when Estrada was attacked by longtime allied El Bronco I after Estrada allegedly ripped an El Bronco picture. El Bronco I and La Revolición Dominicana (The Dominican Revolution) lead El Bronco I attacked Estrada.

Estrada was the leader of El Poder Supremo (The Supreme Power) Heel stable in the WWC. On November 23, 2006, he managed Hannibal and Black Pain to win the WWC Tag Team titles from Jesus Castillo and Chris Joel in Carolina, Puerto Rico.

Began using the nickname "Mr. Hardcore" when he adopted the Hardcore wrestling style and formed a tag team with Huracan Castillo Jr. and formed "La Evolucion Hardcore" or The Hardcore Evolution due to the hardcore wrestling style that this two superstars have. Being both the most dangerous second-generation tag-team wrestlers to dominate Puerto Rico. Estrada then moved on to work in Japan where he tagged with Abdullah The Butcher, went to Mexico and various independent companies in the United States. Quit WWC in June 2009 after a dispute with the office and moved to Florida. Several years later he got in good terms again with WWC.

== Personal life and death ==
In July 2024, Rico Suave was involved in a car collision in Florida where he suffered a fracture on his leg. Due to his diabetes condition, he underwent surgery that resulted in the amputation of part of his right leg.

Suave died from heart failure in Vero Beach, Florida, on March 20, 2025, at the age of 54. He had been scheduled to have open heart surgery at the end of March. WWC dedicated the 2025 WWC Aniversario show to him before his death.

== Championships and accomplishments ==
- Independent Wrestling Association Florida
  - IWA Florida Tag Team Championship (1 time, inaugural) - with Ricky Ortiz
- Pro Wrestling Illustrated
  - PWI ranked him #255 of the top 500 singles wrestlers in the PWI 500 in 2003
- South Carolina Championship Wrestling
  - SCCW Tag Team Championship - with Joe Don Smith (1 time)
- World Wrestling Council
  - WWC Caribbean Heavyweight Championship (2 times)
  - WWC Puerto Rico Heavyweight Championship (3 times)
  - WWC Television Championship (4 times)
  - WWC World Tag Team Championship (10 times) - with Eddie Watts (1), Ricky Santana (1), Agente Bruno (1), Diabolico (2), Eric Alexander (1), Tim Arson (2), El Bronco #1 (1) and Huracán Castillo (1)
  - WWC Hardcore Championship (2 times)

== See also ==
- Professional wrestling in Puerto Rico
