= Yldefonso =

Yldefonso may refer to:

- Parque Yldefonso Solá Morales, multi-use stadium in Caguas, Puerto Rico
- Teófilo Yldefonso (1903–1943), Filipino swimmer in the breaststroke
