= Larry Sharpe (wrestler) =

Irish-American professional wrestler (1951–2017)

Personal information
- Born: Larry Weil; June 26, 1951 Tralee, Ireland
- Died: April 10, 2017 (aged 65) Woodbury, New Jersey, U.S.
- Cause of death: Liver disease
- Website: http://www.monsterfactory.org

Professional wrestling career
- Ring name(s): Larry Sharpe; Larry Weil
- Billed height: 5 ft 11 in (180 cm)
- Billed weight: 264 lb (120 kg)
- Billed from: Castleisland, Ireland
- Trained by: Mr. Fuji; Gorilla Monsoon; Nikolai Volkoff
- Debut: 1974
- Retired: 2004

Larry Weil (June 26, 1951 – April 10, 2017) was an Irish-American professional wrestler, manager and trainer who fought as "Pretty Boy" Larry Sharpe. He founded the Monster Factory professional wrestling school, and trained many well-known wrestlers including Kevin Von Erich.

== Professional wrestling career ==
Larry Sharpe was a successful wrestler at Paulsboro High School in New Jersey. He had a record 13–1–1 and was ranked fourth in the NCAA national rankings. In 1974, he was scouted by Red Berry and Gorilla Monsoon who trained him for a life in professional wrestling and later that year Larry made his pro wrestling debut in the WWF. Larry then toured Japan and various territories including Texas, Florida, Puerto Rico, and the Mid Atlantic.

Sharpe headed to Canada, where he won his first championship while working for Stampede Wrestling in Calgary, Alberta. Forming a tag team with Ripper Collins, he won the Stampede Wrestling International Tag Team Championship on September 24, 1976. The team held the title for less than one month, dropping it to Ed and Jerry Morrow on October 15. In June 1977, Sharpe returned to the WWWF where he formed a tag team with Dynamite Jack Evans (who was working in the WWWF in preliminary and mid-card matches). The Hollywood Blondes (as they were known) had a run winning matches on television and at live events. They impressed Gorilla Monsoon (who owned part of the World Wrestling Council) who sent them to Puerto Rico for their most successful run.

On December 17, 1977, they defeated Carlos Colón and Victor Jovica to win the WWC North American Tag Team Championship. The title was declared vacant on April 22 the following year because of a controversial match against Jovica and Chief Thunder Cloud. The teams met for a rematch on May 6, and the Hollywood Blondes regained the championship. Three weeks later, however, they lost the title to Colón and Thunder Cloud. Sharpe's next stop was Hawaii where he quickly became the top contender for the NWA Hawaii Heavyweight Championship. In November 1978 when the previous champion, Don Muraco, won the NWA Pacific International Heavyweight Championship, was forced to vacate the Hawaiian championship, Sharpe was awarded the title, losing it to Mando Guerrero on November 22. After a brief stint in the mid-Atlantic, he returned to the WWF in 1979. He was given a small push by Vince McMahon Sr, but ended up leaving to wrestle independently and open his training school.

== The World Famous Monster Factory ==
The World Famous Monster Factory was a professional wrestling school in Paulsboro, New Jersey from 1983 to 2025. It is considered to have been the first publicly available professional wrestling school. Sharpe opened the wrestling school with "Nature Boy" Buddy Rogers in 1983 and wrestled part-time until retiring in August 1991. Though Sharpe had trained wrestlers prior to officially opening the school that had significant renown, the school's first famous pupil was Scott "Bam Bam" Bigelow, whose success brought a lot of attention to the school.

In February 2008, the school was threatened by a fire that had started at the building adjacent to the school, ANA Laboratories, and the building was evacuated by the school trainers. The fire was confined to the laboratory until its roof collapsed however, according to Camden County Chief Fire Marshal Paul Hartstein, only a firewall prevented the fire from reaching the school. The school had been in the middle of drills when the fire broke out although all the students were safely evacuated to the outside parking lot.

Sharpe died of liver disease in New Jersey at age 65 on April 10, 2017.

Sharpe's wrestling students have included:

- Tony Atlas
- Big Show
- Bam Bam Bigelow
- D'Lo Brown
- Chris Candido
- Cliff Compton
- Sonjay Dutt
- Giant Silva
- Barry Hardy
- Chris Harris
- The Headbangers
- Debbie Jeffrey / Bad Karma
- King Kong Bundy
- Balls Mahoney
- Ray Odyssey
- The Pitbulls
- Raven
- Tony Ricca
- Rocco Rock
- Sheamus
- J. T. Southern
- Tony Stetson
- Bill Irwin
- Dirty Dennis Allen
- Tatanka
- Tank Toland
- Virgil
- Kevin Von Erich
- The Godfather
- Mike Gola

== Championships and accomplishments ==
- 50th State Big Time Wrestling
  - NWA Hawaii Heavyweight Championship (1 time)
- North American Wrestling Federation
  - NAWF Heavyweight Championship (1 time)
- Northeast Championship Wrestling
  - NCW Heavyweight Championship (1 time)
- Northeast Championship Wrestling (Tom Janette)
  - NCW Heavyweight Championship (2 times)
- Stampede Wrestling
  - Stampede Wrestling International Tag Team Championship – with Ripper Collins
- World Wrestling Council
  - WWC North American Tag Team Championship (2 times) – with Jack Evans
