= WWC North American Tag Team Championship =

Professional wrestling tag team championship

Details
- Promotion: Capitol Sports Promotions; Dominican Wrestling Federation
- Date established: January 6, 1974; March 6, 1992
- Date retired: July 20, 1987; September 2, 1992

Other names
- NWA North America Tag Team Championship (1974–1987); DWF North America Tag Team Championship (1992)
Statistics
- First champions: Huracán Castillo and Don Serrano
- Most reigns: As a team: Los Pastores, Frankie Laine and Dutch Mantel (4 reigns); As an individual: Carlos Colón (14 reigns)
- Longest reign: José Miguel Pérez and Carlos Colón (210 days)
- Shortest reign: The Castillo Brothers (1 day)

The WWC North American Tag Team Championship, also known as the Puerto Rican version of the NWA North American Tag Team Championship, was a major tag team championship that was used and defended in Capitol Sports Promotions (CSP, later the World Wrestling Council (WWC)). The promotion, still in operation today, is based out of Puerto Rico and was a National Wrestling Alliance (NWA) affiliate until 1988. This title was the third NWA sanctioned championship to use the "NWA North American Tag Team Championship" name and, while its name suggests it was a title defended across the continent, it was actually only used within the Puerto Rico territory.

== Title history ==
Wrestler:	Times:	Date:	Location:	Notes:	Reference:
Huracán Castillo and Don Serrano	1	January 6, 1974	Guaynabo, Puerto Rico	Won a 6-tag team tournament final.	
Carlos Colón and Gino Caruso	1	April 5, 1974	Aguadilla, Puerto Rico		
Castillo Brothers (Huracán Castillo ^{(2)} and Maravilla)	1	April 11, 1974	Bayamon, Puerto Rico	Maravilla formerly Known as Raúl Castillo.	
Jose Miguel Pérez and Carlos Colón ^{(2)}	1	May 12, 1974	Caguas, Puerto Rico		
Bruce Swayze and Jim Dalton	1	June 1, 1974	Caguas, Puerto Rico		
Jose Miguel Pérez ^{(2)} and Carlos Colón ^{(3)}	2	July 12, 1974	Ponce, Puerto Rico		
The Assassins (Jody Hamilton and Tom Renesto)	1	July 20, 1974	Caguas, Puerto Rico		
José Rivera and Jack Veneno	1	November 23, 1974	Caguas, Puerto Rico		
Vikingo and Ciclón Sudamericano	1	December 21, 1974	Caguas, Puerto Rico		
The Martels (Pierre Martel and Michel Martel)	1	March 8, 1975	Caguas, Puerto Rico		
José Rivera ^{(2)} and Ciclón	1	August 2, 1975	Caguas, Puerto Rico		
Bull Gregory and Ali Baba	1	October 11, 1975	Bayamón, Puerto Rico		
Carlos Colón ^{(4)} and “Cowboy” Bob Ellis	1	December 25, 1975	Caguas, Puerto Rico		
The Spoilers (I and II)	1	January 10, 1976	Caguas, Puerto Rico		
Los Infernos (I and II)	1	January 17, 1976	Caguas, Puerto Rico		
Held up		March 6, 1976	Bayamón, Puerto Rico	After a match between José Rivera and José Miguel Pérez and Inferno I and Inferno II.	
Los Infernos (I and II)	2	March 13, 1976	Bayamón, Puerto Rico	Defeated Rivera and Pérez in a rematch.	
Held up		August 7, 1976	Caguas, Puerto Rico	In a match between Los Dinámicos and Los Infernos.	
Los Infernos (I and II)	3	August 28, 1976	Bayamón, Puerto Rico	Defeated Colón and Rivera in a rematch.	
Antonino Rocca and José Miguel Pérez ^{(3)}	1	September 11, 1976	Bayamón, Puerto Rico		
Higo Hamaguchi and Gordon Nelson	1	October 16, 1976	Bayamón, Puerto Rico		
Hercules Ayala and Victor Jovica	1	December 4, 1976	Caguas, Puerto Rico		
The Interns (Jim Starr and Tom Andrews)	1	December 25, 1976	Bayamón, Puerto Rico		
The Martels (Michel Martel ^{(2)} and Daniel Martel)	1	March 4, 1977	Ponce, Puerto Rico		
Held up		May 7, 1977	Bayamón, Puerto Rico	After a match between The Martels and José Rivera and Hercules Ayala.	
The Martels (Michel Martel ^{(3)} and Daniel Martel ^{(2)})	2	May 21, 1977	Caguas, Puerto Rico	Defeated José Rivera and Hercules Ayala in a rematch.	
Los Escorpiones (I and II)	1	June 25, 1977	Caguas, Puerto Rico	Known as José Ventura and Raúl Reyes.	
The Martels (Michel Martel ^{(4)} and Daniel Martel ^{(3)})	3	July 2, 1977	Caguas, Puerto Rico		
Los Dinámicos (Carlos Colón ^{(5)} and José Rivera ^{(3)})	1	August 27, 1977	Bayamón, Puerto Rico		
The Samoans (Afa and Sika)	1	October 29, 1977	Caguas, Puerto Rico		
Carlos Colón ^{(6)} and Victor Jovica ^{(2)}	1	November 14, 1977	San Juan, Puerto Rico		
The Hollywood Blonds (Jack Evans and Larry Sharpe)	1	December 17, 1977	San Juan, Puerto Rico		
Held up		April 22, 1978	Caguas, Puerto Rico	After a match between The Hollywood Blonds and Carlos Colón and Chief Thunder Cloud.	
The Hollywood Blonds (Jack Evans and Larry Sharpe)	2	May 6, 1978	Bayamón, Puerto Rico	Defeated Colón and Thunder Cloud in rematch.	
Carlos Colón ^{(7)} and Chief Thunder Cloud	1	May 27, 1978	Bayamón, Puerto Rico		
The Martels (Pierre ^{(2)} and Jean)	1	July 22, 1978	San Juan, Puerto Rico		
Carlos Colón ^{(8)} and Chief Thunder Cloud	2	Between 1978 and 1979	Puerto Rico		
The Martels (Pierre ^{(3)} and Rick)	1	January 20, 1979	Puerto Rico		
The Invaders (Invader I and Invader II)	1	February 3, 1979	Bayamón, Puerto Rico	The Invaders defeated Pierre Martel and Rick Martel in a loser-leaves-town match.	
Dutch Mantel and Frankie Laine	1	February 10, 1979	Bayamón, Puerto Rico		
José Rivera ^{(4)} and Chief Thunder Cloud ^{(3)}	1	March 1979?	Puerto Rico		
Dutch Mantel and Frankie Laine	2	April 1979?	Puerto Rico		
Carlos Colón ^{(9)} and Huracán Castillo ^{(3)}	1	May 5, 1979	San Juan, Puerto Rico		
Dutch Mantel & Frankie Laine	3	May 19, 1979	Bayamón, Puerto Rico		
The Invaders (Invader I and Invader II)	2	August 5, 1979	San Juan, Puerto Rico		
Dutch Mantel and Frankie Laine	4	August 11, 1979	Caguas, Puerto Rico		
The Invaders (Invader I and Invader II)	3	September 24, 1979?	Puerto Rico		
Haru Sonoda and Mitsu Ishikawa	1	October 13, 1979	Bayamón, Puerto Rico		
Huracán Castillo ^{(4)} and Ciclón Negro	1	November 17, 1979	Bayamón, Puerto Rico		
Roger Kirby and Dick Steinborn	1	December 27, 1979	Bayamón, Puerto Rico		
Carlos Colón ^{(10)} and Eric Froelich	1	February 9, 1980	Caguas, Puerto Rico		
Luke Graham and Gorgeous George Jr.	1	March 22, 1980	Bayamón, Puerto Rico		
Carlos Colón ^{(11)} and Eric Froelich ^{(2)}	2	April 5, 1980	Puerto Rico		
Luke Graham ^{(2)} and Bulldog Brower	1	April 12, 1980	San Juan, Puerto Rico		
Pierre Martel ^{(4)} and Mr. Fuji	1	May 23, 1980	Ponce, Puerto Rico		
Los Dinámicos (Carlos Colón ^{(12)} and José Rivera ^{(5)})	2	June 14, 1980	Caguas, Puerto Rico		
Luke Graham ^{(3)} and Bulldog Brower ^{(2)}	2	August 1980	Puerto Rico		
Los Dinámicos (Carlos Colón ^{(13)} and José Rivera ^{(6)})	3	September 13, 1980	Bayamón, Puerto Rico		
Dutch Mantel ^{(5)} and Dennis Condrey	1	October 11, 1980	Bayamón, Puerto Rico		
Carlos Colón ^{(14)} and Invader I ^{(4)}	1	January 19, 1981	San Juan, Puerto Rico		
Los Pastores (Luke Williams and Butch Miller)	1	February 28, 1981	Bayamón, Puerto Rico		
The Interns (Jim Starr ^{(2)} and Tom Andrews ^{(2)})	2	April 4, 1981	Bayamón, Puerto Rico		
Los Pastores (Luke Williams ^{(2)} and Butch Miller ^{(2)})	2	May 22, 1981	Bayamón, Puerto Rico		
The Brisco Brothers (Jack and Jerry)	1	June 1981	Puerto Rico		
Los Pastores (Luke Williams ^{(3)} and Johnny Miller)	1	July 1981	Puerto Rico		
The Brisco Brothers (Jack and Jerry)	2	August 8, 1981	San Juan, Puerto Rico		
The Fabulous Kangaroos (Don Kent and Bruno Bekkar)	1	October 22, 1981	San Juan, Puerto Rico		
Invader I ^{(5)} and Super Gladiator	1	November 23, 1981	San Juan, Puerto Rico		
The Fabulous Kangaroos (Don Kent and Bruno Bekkar)	2	December 5, 1981	Bayamón, Puerto Rico		
Invader I ^{(6)} and Super Gladiator ^{(2)}	2	January 26, 1982	Bayamón, Puerto Rico		
The Moondogs (Rex and Spot)	1	February 13, 1982	San Juan, Puerto Rico		
Held up		May 8, 1982	San Juan, Puerto Rico	After a match between The Gilbert Family and The Moondogs.	
The Moondogs (Rex and Spot)	2	May 15, 1982	San Juan, Puerto Rico		
The Gilbert Family (Tommy Gilbert and Eddie Gilbert)	1	June 5, 1982	San Juan, Puerto Rico		
The Fabulous Kangaroos (Don Kent ^{(3)} and Johnny Heffernan)	1	August 14, 1982	San Juan, Puerto Rico		
The Assassins (Jody Hamilton and Tom Renesto)	2	August 28, 1982	San Juan, Puerto Rico		
Pierre Martel ^{(5)} and Gino de la Serra	1	September 18, 1982	Ponce, Puerto Rico		
Held Up		September 25, 1982	San Juan, Puerto Rico	After a match between The Mercenaries and Pierre Martel and Gino de la Serra.	
Los Mercenarios (Cuban Assassin and Jerry Morrow)	1	October 30, 1982	San Juan, Puerto Rico	Won the rematch against Pierre Martel and Gino de la Serra.	
Scorpio and Mr. Tempest	1	February 5, 1983	San Juan, Puerto Rico		
Gran Apollo and Enrique Viera	1	February 12, 1983	Manatí, Puerto Rico		
Scorpio and Mr. Tempest	2	March 12, 1983?	Puerto Rico		
Buddy Landel and Terry Gibbs	1	March 26, 1983	San Juan, Puerto Rico		
Gran Apollo ^{(2)} and King Tonga	1	June 11, 1983	San Juan, Puerto Rico		
The Medics (Super Médico I ^{(1)} and Super Medico II ^{(1)})	1	July 10, 1983	Aguadilla, Puerto Rico		
Gran Apollo ^{(3)} and King Tonga ^{(2)}	2	October 8, 1983	Guaynabo, Puerto Rico		
Invader III ^{(1)} and Toru Tanaka ^{(1)}	1	April 9, 1984	San Juan, Puerto Rico		
The Medics (Super Médico I ^{(2)} and Super Medico II ^{(2)})	2	June 7, 1984	Bayamón, Puerto Rico		
The Invaders (I ^{(7)} and III ^{(2)})	1	August 4, 1984	San Juan, Puerto Rico		
Los Pastores (Luke Williams ^{(4)} and Butch Miller ^{(3)})	3	January 6, 1985	Bayamón, Puerto Rico		
Invader III ^{(3)} and Super Médico I ^{(3)}	1	March 2, 1985	Guaynabo, Puerto Rico		
Los Pastores (Luke Williams ^{(5)} and Butch Miller ^{(4)})	4	March 23, 1985	San Juan, Puerto Rico		
The Invaders (Invader I ^{(8)} and Invader III ^{(4)})	2	August 25, 1985	Bayamón, Puerto Rico		
The Starr Cousins (Ron Starr and Chicky Starr)	1	March 5, 1986	San Juan, Puerto Rico		
Held up		April 19, 1986	Caguas, Puerto Rico	After a match between The Invaders I and III and The Starr Cousins.	
The Invaders (Invader I ^{(9)} and Invader III ^{(5)})	3	April 26, 1986?	Puerto Rico	Won the rematch against The Starr Cousins (Chicky Starr and Ron Starr).	
The Starr Cousins (Ron Starr and Chicky Starr)	2	May 31, 1986	Bayamón, Puerto Rico		
The Puerto Rican Express (Miguelito Pérez and Huracán Castillo Jr.)	1	November 8, 1986	San Juan, Puerto Rico		
The Starr Cousins; Ron Starr and Chicky Starr)	3	November 15, 1986?	Puerto Rico		
Miguelito Pérez ^{(2)} and Big Red	1	December 6, 1986	Maunabo, Puerto Rico		
Gran Mendoza and Bob Heffernan	1	January 6, 1987	San Juan, Puerto Rico		
Miguelito Pérez ^{(3)} and Tony Atlas	1	April 25, 1987	Caguas, Puerto Rico		
The Hunters (Dale Veasey and Bob Brown)	1	June 20, 1987	San Juan, Puerto Rico		
Retired		July 25, 1987	Maunabo, Puerto Rico		
DWF North America Tag Team Championship
The Headhunters (Headhunter A and Headhunter B)	1	March 6, 1992	Dominican Republic	Won a tournament 6-tag team tournament final.	
Abandoned later on September 2, 1992
