= WWC Caribbean Tag Team Championship =

Professional wrestling tag team championship

Details
- Promotion: Universal Wrestling Promotions (UWP); Top Heavyweight Wrestling Promotions (THWP); World Wrestling Promotions (WWP); Dominican Wrestling Federation (DWF); World Wrestling Council (WWC); American World Promotions (AWP)
- Date established: 1960s
- Date retired: September 2, 1992

Other names
- UWP Caribbean Tag Team Championship; THWP Caribbean Tag Team Championship; WWP Caribbean Tag Team Championship; DWF Caribbean Tag Team Championship; AWP Caribbean Tag Team Championship
Statistics
- First champions: For Now: Tigre Pérez & El Martillo
- Final champions: Latin Connection (Ray Gonzalez and Ricky Santana)
- Most reigns: As a tag team: Caribbean Express (Huracán Castillo Jr. and Miguel Pérez Jr.) (6 reigns) As individual: Invader I (7 reigns)
- Longest reign: The Broncos (I and II) (276 days)
- Shortest reign: Latin Connection (Ricky Santana and Ray González) (1 day)
- Oldest champion: Don Kent (57 years)
- Youngest champion: Ray González (19 years)

The WWC Caribbean Tag Team Championship was a third-string tag team championship that was defended in the World Wrestling Council.

== Title history ==
Wrestler:	Times:	Date:	Place:	Notes:	Reference:
Unknown Caribbean Tag Team Championship
Black Georgie & Tigre Pérez	1	1960s	Puerto Rico		
Championship history is unrecorded from 1960s to 1964.
El Martillo & El Dragón	1	1964	Puerto Rico		
Championship history is unrecorded from 1964 to 1975.
UWP Caribbean Tag Team Championship
Black Georgie ^{(2)} & Victor Lebrón	1	August 29, 1975<	Puerto Rico		
Championship history is unrecorded from 1975 to 1978.
The Cherokees	1	August 8, 1978	Bayamón, Puerto Rico		
The Invaders (Invader I and Invader II)	1	December 9, 1978	San Juan, Puerto Rico		
The Hart Family (Smith Hart and Bret Hart)	1	June 16, 1979?	Las Marías, Puerto Rico		
THWP Caribbean Tag Team Championship
Bill Martínez and Henry London	1	July 14, 1979?	San Germán, Puerto Rico		
Los Hermanos Perón (Chicky Starr and Ángelo Rivera)	1	August 20, 1979	Vega Alta, Puerto Rico		
Kengo Arakawa and Kendo Kimura	1	September 29, 1979	Vega Alta, Puerto Rico		
WWP Caribbean Tag Team Championship
The Sasaki Twins (Hiro Sasaki and Masa Sasaki)	1	November 17, 1979	Caguas, Puerto Rico		
The Fabulous Kangaroos (Don Kent and Bruno Bekkar)	1	December 8, 1979	San Juan, Puerto Rico		
DWF Caribbean Tag Team Championship
The Original Broncos (Bronco I and Bronco II)	1	January 6, 1980	Santo Domingo, Dominican Republic		
Titán and Relámpago Hernández	1	August 8, 1980	Samaná, Dominican Republic		
The Original Broncos (Bronco I and Bronco II)	2	December 2, 1980	Santiago, Dominican Republic		
Jack Veneno and Relampago Hernández ^{(2)}	1	September 4, 1981	Santo Domingo, Dominican Republic		
WWC Caribbean Tag Team Championship
The Original Broncos (Bronco I and Bronco II)	3	February 8, 1982	San Juan, Puerto Rico		
The Moondogs (Rex and Spot)	1	July 10, 1982	Bayamón, Puerto Rico		
Invader I ^{(2)} and Super Gladiator	1	December 6, 1982	Bayamón, Puerto Rico		
The Moondogs (Rex and Spot)	2	December 20, 1982	San Juan, Puerto Rico		
Buddy Landel and Terry Gibbs	1	May 14, 1983	San Juan, Puerto Rico		
Super Médicos (Super Médico I and Super Médico II)	1	June 6, 1983	Bayamón, Puerto Rico		
The Invaders (II ^{(2)} and IV)	1	July 2, 1983	San Lorenzo, Puerto Rico		
Title held up on January 6, 1984 in Bayamón, Puerto Rico between the match of The Invaders and The Super Medicos.
The Super Médicos (Super Medico I and Super Medico II)	2	January 20, 1984	San Germán, Puerto Rico	Defeated The Invaders in a rematch.	
The High Flyers (Greg Gagne & Jim Brunzell)	1	July 8, 1984	Santa Isabel, Puerto Rico		
The Invaders (Invader I ^{(3)} and Invader III)	1	October 6, 1984	Mayagüez, Puerto Rico		
The Super Médicos (I and II)	3	January 10, 1985	San Sebastián, Puerto Rico		
Dutch Mantel and Wendell Cooley	1	June 5, 1985	San Juan, Puerto Rico		
The Invaders (Invader I ^{(4)} and Invader IV ^{(2)})	1	October 11, 1985	Mayagüez, Puerto Rico		
The Power Twins (Larry and Dave)	1	March 9, 1986	Maricao, Puerto Rico		
The Invaders (Invader I ^{(5)} and Invader IV ^{(3)})	2	August 6, 1986	Bayamón, Puerto Rico		
Superflys (Eric and Charlie)	1	May 22, 1987	Manatí, Puerto Rico		
Vacated on October 8, 1987 in Bayamón, Puerto Rico after Superfly Eric suffer a knee injury.
Samoan Swat Team (Fatu and Samu)	1	November 7, 1987	Guaynabo, Puerto Rico	Defeated Invader I and Invader II in a tournament final.	
The Youngbloods (Mark Youngblood and Chris Youngblood)	1	December 12, 1987	Bayamón, Puerto Rico		
The Kansas City Jayhawks (Bobby Jaggers and Dan Kroffat)	1	February 6, 1988	Guaynabo, Puerto Rico		
The Youngbloods (Mark Youngblood and Chris Youngblood)	2	April 23, 1988	Guaynabo, Puerto Rico	Also The Youngbloods defeated Ninja Express for the WWC World Tag Team Championship on May 14, 1988 in Caguas, Puerto Rico.	
The Kansas City Jayhawks (Bobby Jaggers and Dan Kroffat)	2	June 11, 1988	Caguas, Puerto Rico		
The Caribbean Express (Huracán Castillo, Jr. and Miguel Pérez Jr.)	1	December 15, 1988	Bayamón, Puerto Rico		
Ninja Express (Kensuke Sasaki and Mr.Pogo)	1	January 14, 1989	Caguas, Puerto Rico		
The Caribbean Express (Huracán Castillo Jr. and Miguel Pérez Jr.)	2	March 11, 1989	Carolina, Puerto Rico		
Ninja Express (Kensuke Sasaki and Mr.Pogo)	2	April 1, 1989	San Juan, Puerto Rico		
The Batten Twins (Brad Batten and Bart Batten)	1	April 15, 1989	Dorado, Puerto Rico		
Held up after a match between Batten Twins and The Caribbean Express (Miguel Pérez, Jr. and Huracán Castillo, Jr.) on April 29, 1989 in Carolina, Puerto Rico.
The Batten Twins (Brad Batten and Bart Batten)	2	May 14, 1989	San Juan, Puerto Rico	Defeated Castillo, Jr. and Pérez in a rematch.	
The Caribbean Express (Huracán Castillo Jr. and Miguel Pérez Jr.)	3	June 9, 1989	Jayuya, Puerto Rico		
Los Mercenarios (Cuban Assassin and Jerry Morrow)	1	October 7, 1989	Bayamón, Puerto Rico		
Los Nuevos Mercenarios (Cuban Assassin ^{(2)} and Ron Starr)	1	January 25, 1990	San Juan, Puerto Rico	Ron Starr replaces Jerry Morrow who quit from the company.	
Vacated After the match of The Invaders vs Los Nuevos Mercenarios on February 25, 1990.
The Invaders (Invader I ^{(6)} and Invader IV ^{(4)})	3	March 10, 1990	Caguas, Puerto Rico	Defeated Cuban Assassin and Ron Starr in a rematch.	
Leo Burke and Chicky Starr ^{(2)}	1	March 25, 1990	San Juan, Puerto Rico		
The Invaders (Invader I ^{(7)} and Invader IV ^{(5)})	4	May 5, 1990	Caguas, Puerto Rico		
Los Mercenarios (Cuban Assassin ^{(3)} and Jerry Morrow ^{(2)})	2	June 24, 1990	Juana Diaz, Puerto Rico		
The Caribbean Express (Huracán Castillo, Jr. and Miguel Pérez, Jr.)	4	July 7, 1990	Bayamón, Puerto Rico		
Rick Valentine and Eric Embry	1	September 23, 1990	Juana Diaz, Puerto Rico		
Super Médicos (Super Médico I ^{(4)} and Super Médico III)	1	November 10, 1990	Bayamón, Puerto Rico		
Rick Valentine ^{(2)} and Eric Embry ^{(2)}	2	December 15, 1990	Bayamón, Puerto Rico		
Super Médicos (Super Médico I ^{(5)} and Super Médico III)	2	January 6, 1991	San Juan, Puerto Rico		
Rick Valentine ^{(3)} and El Galan Mendoza	1	January 23, 1991	San Juan, Puerto Rico	Galan Mendoza was formerly known as Gran Mendoza.	
The Caribbean Express (Huracán Castillo, Jr. and Miguel Pérez, Jr.)	5	March 9, 1991	Carolina, Puerto Rico		
El Galan Mendoza ^{(2)} and Billy Joe Travis	1	May 18, 1991	San Juan, Puerto Rico		
The Caribbean Express (Huracán Castillo, Jr. and Miguel Pérez, Jr.)	6	June 1, 1991	Bayamón, Puerto Rico		
Vacated when The Caribbean Express won the WWC World Tag Team Titles on July 13, 1991 in Carolina, Puerto Rico.
Latin Connection (Ray González and Ricky Santana)	1	August 17, 1991	Ponce, Puerto Rico	Defeated The State Patrol in an 8-tag team tournament final.	
The State Patrol (Lt. James Earl Wright and Sgt. Billy Joe Barber)	1	September 7, 1991	Bayamón, Puerto Rico		
Latin Connection (Ray González and Ricky Santana)	2	September 28, 1991	Carolina, Puerto Rico		
Vacated and inactive on September 29, 1991.
AWP Caribbean Tag Team Championship
Chicky Starr ^{(3)} and Hércules Ayala	1	November 9, 1991?	Bayamón, Puerto Rico?	Won a 6-man tag team tournament final.	
DWF Caribbean Tag Team Championship
Mandella and Sabud	1	March 6, 1992	Santo Domingo, Dominican Republic	Recognized by DWF for a briefly time.	
Abandoned later on September 2, 1992
