= Victor Jovica =

Croatian professional wrestler and promoter (born 1945)

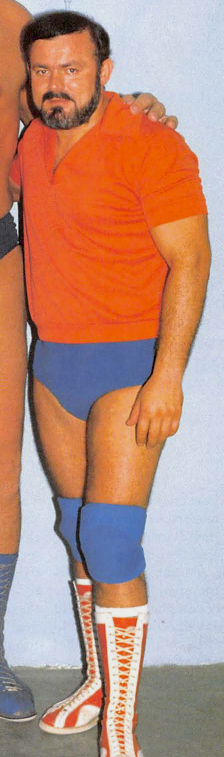
- Jovica, c. 1983

Personal information
- Born: November 26, 1945 (age 80) Metković, SR Croatia, SFR Yugoslavia

Professional wrestling career
- Ring name: Victor Jovica
- Debut: 1971
- Retired: 2024

Victor Jovica (born November 26, 1945) is a Croatian-born Puerto Rican retired professional wrestler, and promoter. Along with Carlos Colón, he is the co-founder and promoter of Capitol Sports Promotions, now known as the World Wrestling Council (WWC), which, since the 1970s, has been one of the dominant promotions on the island of Puerto Rico.

== Professional wrestling career ==
Jovica made his professional wrestling debut in 1971, working primarily in the Canadian Stampede Wrestling promotion. By 1974 he had relocated to Puerto Rico where he, along with Carlos Colón founded Capitol Sports Promotions (later renamed World Wrestling Council; WWC).

In December 1976, Jovica and tag team partner Hercules Ayala won the NWA North American Tag Team Championship (Puerto Rico/WWC version) from Heigo Hamaguchi and Gordon Nelson. They held it for 21 days before losing it to Los Super Médicos (Super Médico I and Super Médico II). In November 1977, Jovica won the North American tag Team Championship for a second time, this time teaming up with Carlos Colón to defeat The Wild Samoans (Afa and Sika). Just over a month later they team were defeated by the Hollywood Blonds ("Dynamite" Jack Evans and "Pretty Boy" Larry Sharpe.

On February 8, 1983, Jovica appeared to have defeated Ric Flair to win the NWA World Heavyweight Championship, being announced as the champion after the match. Three days later the NWA Championship commission announced that the title change had been over turned as they declared that Jovica has his feet on the rope during the pin and thus Jovica was never officially a champion. This was a common tactic used in the days when the NWA champion was a traveling champion, allowing the local contender to look good, send the fans home happy and then allow the recognized champion to continue to tour.

By the 1990s Jovica wrestled less and less, focusing on the promotional aspects of wrestling instead, appearing as part of storylines, especially a long running feud over control of the WWC. He would occasionally wrestle until 2013.

He returned to wrestling on October 28, 2023 at the age of 77 when he defeated Gallo The Producer at WWC Halloween Wrestling Xtravaganza 2023. His last match was on June 8, 2024 when he teamed with La Industria Honorable (Alfred Allen, Angel Rodriguez and Black Scorpion) losing to Los Hermanos Rivera (Marcial Rivera & Wilfredo Rivera) in a 4 on 2 handicap match at CWA Colision En La Bahia in Catano, Puerto Rico.

== Championships and accomplishments ==
- National Wrestling Alliance
  - NWA World Heavyweight Championship (1 time, unrecognized)
- World Wrestling Council

- Trinidad and Tobago Tag Team Championship (1 time) - with Gama Singh
- WWC North American Tag Team Championship (2 times) - with Hercules Ayala (1) and Carlos Colón (1)
