= Jesús Castillo Jr. =

Puerto Rican wrestler (born 1962)

Jesús Castillo
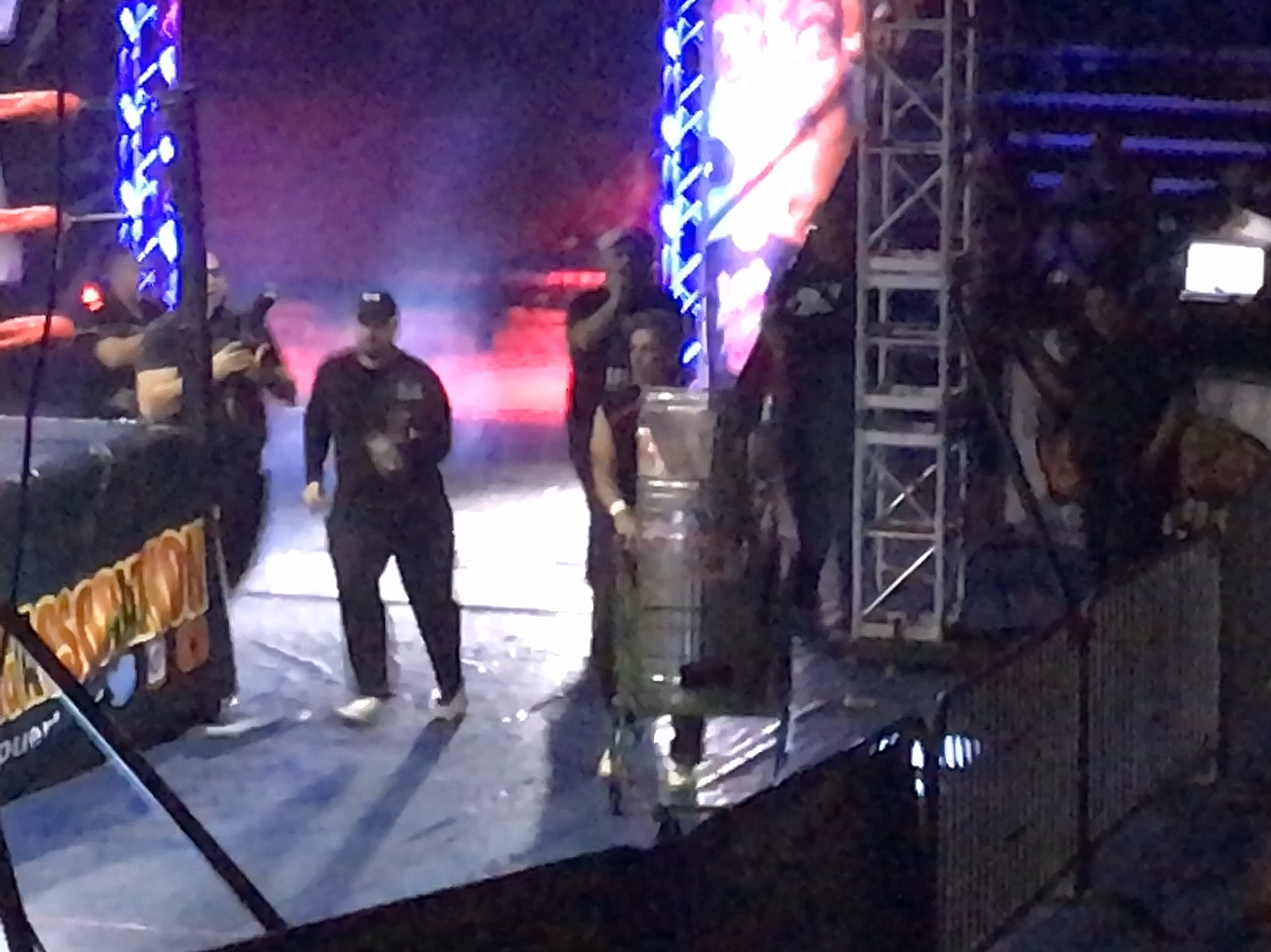

Personal information
- Born: Jesús Daniel Castillo Ortiz Jr. July 15, 1962 (age 64) Bayamón, Puerto Rico

Professional wrestling career
- Ring name(s): Huracan Castillo Jr. El Merenguero; El Macaracachimba; El Olimpico; Daniel Castillo
- Billed height: 5 ft 10 in (178 cm)
- Billed weight: 215 lb (98 kg)
- Debut: 1984
- Retired: 2022

Jesús Daniel Castillo Ortiz (born July 15, 1962) is a Puerto Rican wrestler retired, better known in his native country of Puerto Rico as Huracan Castillo Jr.. He competed in the World Wrestling Federation (WWF) as a member of the Hispanic stable Los Boricuas in the late 1990s as Jesus.

Castillo has wrestled most of his career in Puerto Rico working for the World Wrestling Council (WWC), but he also worked for Americas Wrestling Federation, International Wrestling Association, New Wrestling Stars, and even wrestled overseas in New Japan Pro-Wrestling as Daniel Castillo and All Japan Pro Wrestling as the masked El Olympico. He is the son of Pedro Castillo, known as "Huracan Castillo", a wrestler who fought in Canada, Japan, the United States and Puerto Rico in the 1970s.

== Professional wrestling career ==
=== World Wrestling Council (1984–1997) ===
Castillo got his start wrestling in 1984 as a jobber as Huracan Castillo Jr. and later teamed with Miguel Perez as the Puerto Rican Express winning the WWC Caribbean Tag Team Championship three times and the WWC World Tag Team Championship one time. In 1989, Castillo and Pérez teamed as The Caribbean Express, under the names Daniel Castillo and Jose Pérez in New Japan Pro-Wrestling, and as the masked El Olimpico in All Japan Pro-Wrestling in 1987.

In 1991, Castillo turned heel on his partner Miguel Perez. Castillo took Monster Ripper as his manager and fought with Perez until Castillo went to the Americas Wrestling Federation AWF and became the AWF World Heavyweight Champion. After the death of his father, Huracan Castillo Sr. in 1993, Castillo took a small break from wrestling but returned to the World Wrestling Council. He then began fighting with Carlos Colon, Invader I and Ray Gonzalez. Became a babyface again after an incident when "Hot Stuff" Eddie Gilbert burned Castillo with a fireball to the face.

=== World Wrestling Federation (1997–1999) ===
In June 1997, Castillo made his move to the World Wrestling Federation, as a member of the Los Boricuas stable, which was led by Savio Vega. Castillo mainly competed in tag team matches with other members of the group José Estrada Jr., Miguel Pérez, and leader Savio Vega. In summer 1998, Castillo became a jobber, competing on Shotgun, losing to superstars; featuring a young Edge, X-Pac and Dan Severn. He competed in SuperAstros as El Merenguero until the show went off the air in August 1999 and left the company.

=== International Wrestling Association (2000–2003) ===
After being released by the WWF Castillo joined the newly formed International Wrestling Association (IWA) in Puerto Rico and reunited with Los Boricuas Savio Vega and Miguel Perez. During this time Castillo began to use the Hardcore wrestling style and often used the ring bell against his opponents.

=== Return to World Wrestling Council (2004–2009) ===
Castillo made a return to WWC in 2006 and formed a tag team with Chris Joel, and has held the WWC World Tag Team Championship as a member of the Starr Corporation. He has formed a tag team with Rico Suave and formed "La Evolucion Hardcore" (or The Hardcore Evolution) due to the hardcore wrestling style of these two wrestlers.

=== Late career (2009 – 2022) ===
In November 2012, he wrestled in Puerto Rico's PRWA as he is the general manager of PRWA and the current PRWA World Heavyweight Champion, having defeated Joseph RPM in the finals. In April 2022, Castillo announced his retirement after 38 years being a fully active wrestler. His retirement match happened on April 9 at GZW's Accion Sin Limites, where he and Demolition X defeated Agente Bruno and El Profe. He once came out of retirement later in September to wrestle and defeat Joe Bravo at WWC's 49th Anniversary show.

== Personal life ==
Castillo has a son AJ Castillo who is the first third generation wrestler in Puerto Rico. In November 2012 Huracan Castillo teamed for the first time with his son AJ Castillo against the father and son team of Barrabas and Barrabas Jr.

== Championships and accomplishments ==
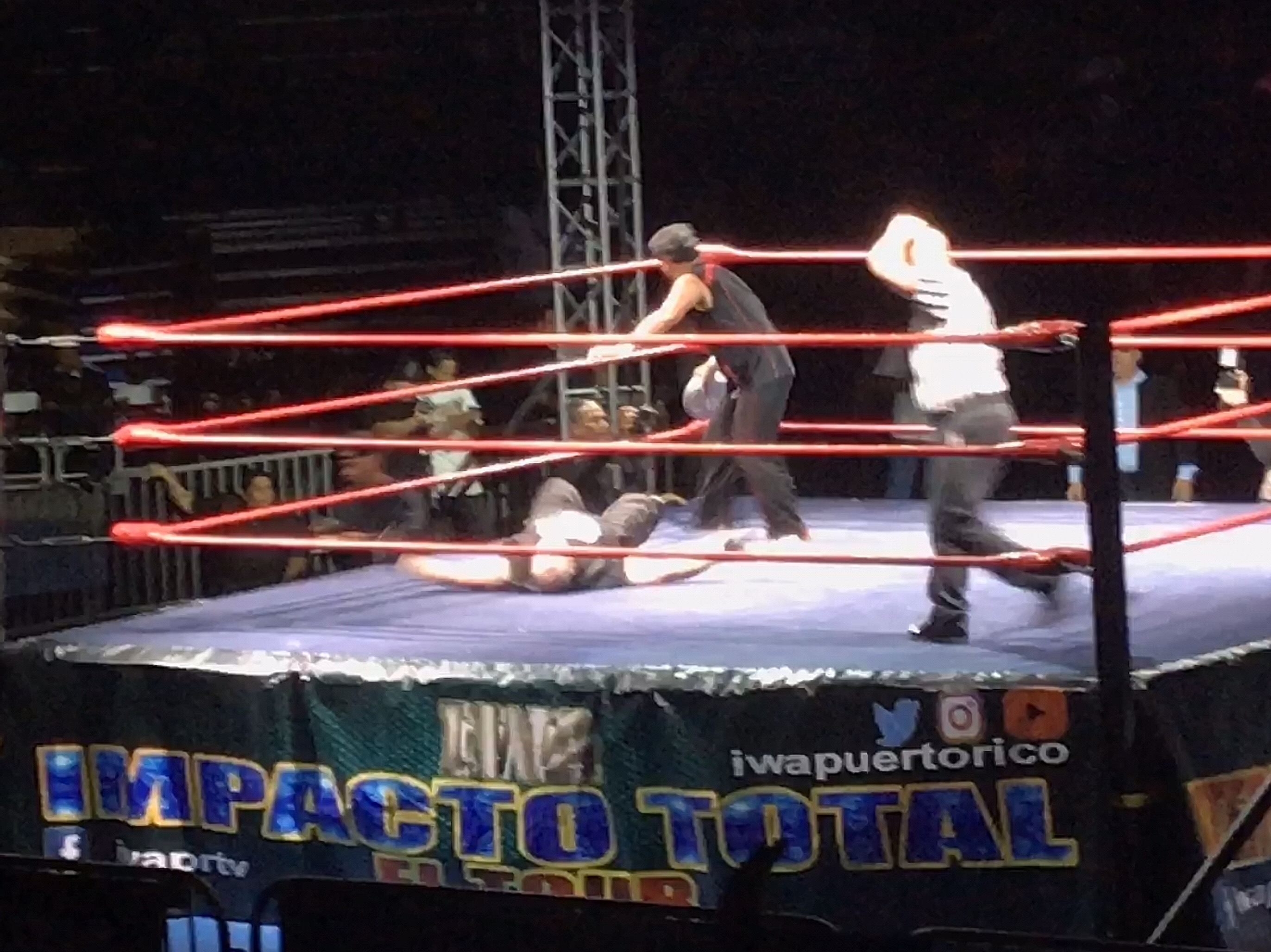
Knocking an opponent with the ring bell behind the referee's back has become a trademark of Castillo.

- Action Wrestling Associated
  - AWA Hardcore Championship (1 time)
- Americas Wrestling Federation
  - AWF World Heavyweight Championship (3 times)
  - AWF Americas Heavyweight Championship (1 time)
- International Wrestling Association
  - IWA Hardcore Championship (12 times)
  - IWA World Tag Team Championship (7 times) – with Miguel Pérez Jr. (7), Ricky Banderas, Fidel Sierra and Pain (1) as Los Intocables
  - IWA Intercontinental Heavyweight Championship (1 time)
- Pro Wrestling Illustrated
  - PWI ranked him #217 of the top 500 singles wrestlers in the PWI 500 in 2003
- Puerto Rico Wrestling Association
  - PRWA World Heavyweight Championship (1 time)
- World Wrestling Council
  - WWC Caribbean Tag Team Championship (6 times) – with Miguel Pérez Jr.
  - NWA Latin American Heavyweight Championship (1 time)
  - WWC Medalla Heavyweight Championship (1 time)
  - WWC Puerto Rico Heavyweight Championship (6 times)
  - WWC North American Tag Team Championship (1 time) – with Miguel Pérez Jr.
  - WWC Television Championship (2 times)
  - WWC Universal Heavyweight Championship (1 time)
  - WWC World Junior Heavyweight Championship (6 times)
  - WWC World Tag Team Championship (15 times) – with Miguel Pérez, Jr. (4), Ray González (3), Chicky Starr (3), Chris Joel (2), Invader #1 (1), Mohammed Hussein (1) and Rico Suave (1)
- Wrestling Observer Newsletter
  - Worst Feud of the Year (1997) – vs. Disciples of Apocalypse
