= WWC Hardcore Championship =

Professional wrestling championship

Details
- Promotion: World Wrestling Council (WWC)
- Date established: 2001
- Date retired: August 10, 2005
Statistics
- First champion: Carlos Colón
- Most reigns: El Nene (3 reigns)
- Longest reign: Trailer Park Trash (312 days)
- Shortest reign: Pierroth (less than 1 day)

The WWC Hardcore Championship was a short-lived title in the World Wrestling Council that was defended under Hardcore wrestling rules.

== Title history ==
Key
No.	Overall reign number
Reign	Reign number for the specific champion
Days	Number of days held

No.	Champion	Championship change			Reign statistics		Notes	Ref.
No.	Champion	Date	Event	Location	Reign	Days	Notes	Ref.
1	Carlos Colón	January 6, 2001	WWC show	San Juan, Puerto Rico	1	1	Defeated One Man Gang and Abdullah the Butcher in 3-way match to become first champion	
2	One Man Gang	January 7, 2001	WWC show	Mayagüez, Puerto Rico	1	20	Defeated Carlos Colón and Abdullah The Butcher in a 3-way match.	
3	Carlos Colón	January 27, 2001	WWC show	Carolina, Puerto Rico	2	120		
4	One Man Gang	May 26, 2001	WWC show	Carolina, Puerto Rico	2	14		
—	Vacated	June 9, 2001	—	—	—	—	One Man Gang missed a title defense due to a cancelled flight.	
5	El Nene	June 16, 2001	WWC show	Carolina, Puerto Rico	1	63	Defeated Carlos Colón to win the vacant title	
6	Super Gladiador (Ricky Frontán)	August 18, 2001	WWC show	Cidra, Puerto Rico	1	21		
7	El Nene	September 8, 2001	WWC show	Bayamón, Puerto Rico	2	35		
8	Invader I	October 13, 2001	WWC show	Carolina, Puerto Rico	1	14		
—	Vacated	October 27, 2001	—	—	—	—	Invader I declare vacant the title to focus on the WWC Puerto Rico Heavyweight Championship.	
9	El Nene	November 3, 2001	WWC show	Caguas, Puerto Rico	3	246	Defeat Abdullah The Butcher for the vacant title.	
—	Vacated	July 7, 2002?	—	—	—	—	The title has been inactive.	
10	Abdullah The Butcher	December 2, 2002	WWC show	Mayagüez, Puerto Rico	1	51	Defeat Sabu for the vacant title.	
11	Trailer Park Trash	January 22, 2003	WWC show	Caguas, Puerto Rico	1	312		
—	Vacated	November 30, 2003	—	—	—	—	After Trailer Park Trash left from WWC.	
12	Sabu	December 6, 2003	WWC show	Mayagüez, Puerto Rico	1	35	Defeat "Mr.Hardcore" Rico Suave for the vacant title.	
13	Rico Suave	January 17, 2004	WWC show	Caguas, Puerto Rico	1	35		
14	Sabu	February 14, 2004	WWC show	Caguas, Puerto Rico	2	28		
15	Rico Suave	March 13, 2004	WWC show	Caguas, Puerto Rico	2	35		
—	Vacated	April 17, 2004	—	—	—	—	The Title was abandoned.	
†	Pierroth Jr.	August 10, 2005	WWC show	Guanajuato, Mexico	1^{†}	†	A championship defended in Mexico falsely labelled as being sanctioned by WWC	
—	Deactivated	August 10, 2005	—	—	—	—	Belt used in Mexico once, no longer an official WWC championship	

== Combined reigns ==
Rank	Wrestler	No. of reigns	Combined days
1	El Nene	3	346
2	Trailer Park Trash	1	312
3	Carlos Colón	2	121
4	Rico Suave	2	70
5	Sabu	2	63
6	Abdullah The Butcher	1	51
7	One Man Gang	2	30
8	Super Gladiador	1	21
9	Invader I	1	14
10	Pierroth	1	1>
