= Johnny Rivera (wrestler) =

Puerto Rican professional wrestler (born 1949)

Personal information
- Born: 1949 Hormigueros, Puerto Rico

Professional wrestling career
- Ring name(s): Johnny Rivera; Invader III; John Rivera
- Billed height: 5"9
- Billed weight: 246 lb (112 kg)
- Billed from: Puerto Rico
- Debut: 1975
- Retired: 2012

Johnny Rivera (born 1949), better known by the ring name Invader III, is a Puerto Rican retired professional wrestler in the World Wide Wrestling Federation, the National Wrestling Alliance, International Championship Wrestling, All Japan Pro Wrestling, New Japan Pro Wrestling and the World Wrestling Council during the 1970s and 1980s.

== Professional wrestling career ==
Began his professional wrestling career in 1975 in the World Wide Wrestling Federation which later became the World Wrestling Federation. He was voted third runner up for PWI Rookie of the Year in Pro Wrestling Illustrated for 1979. He left the WWWF in 1980 and returned to Puerto Rico. Then he divided his time between Puerto Rico and the to the WWWF and have great matches teaming with Jose Gonzalez and Andre the Giant. He also in 1979 challenged Tatsumi Fujinami for WWF World Junior Heavyweight Championship at the Madison Square Garden in New York City. In 1986 he traveled to Japan to have a memorable match against Japanese legend Tiger Mask.

Universal Wresting Association: Mexico

in 1983, he travelled to Mexico to have matches against Mexican star Mano Negra under the name of El Invasor, (the Invader). He at first rejected the idea because there was another Invader character already known in the wrestling industry (Jose Gonzalez), but the promotion established that never a wrestler used that name in Mexico before him. That year at Naucalpan, Mexico he had a mask vs mask match against Mano Negra when he lost his mask. He also defeated another Mexican star Anibal to became double champion, winning the WWC World Junior Heavyweight Championship and Mexico's UWA World Junior Lightweight Championship in San Juan, Puerto Rico.

In 1984, he became Invader III teaming with Invader I as the new version of The Invaders, debuting in the World Wrestling Federation, a.k.a. as WWE where they fight important and establishes teams like Mr. Fuji and Tiger Chung Lee, Roddy Piper and David Schultz and challenging The Wild Samoans (Afa & Sika) for the WWF World Tag Team Championships. After that they returned as a team to their native Puerto Rico to participate for Capitol Sports Promotions having feuds against The Super Medics, The New Zealand Sheepherders (Butch Miller and Luke Williams), Los Famosos Starr Cousins (Ron Starr & Chicky Starr), Dory & Terry Funk, The Ninja Express (Mr. Pogo & Kendo Nagasaki) among others, guiding them to win the WWC World Tag Team Championship three times and the WWC North America Tag Team Championship for two times as The Invaders from 1984 to 1988. he also won the WWC North American Tag team championship one time teaming with Super Medic #1. From 1984 to 1988 he won the WWC World Junior Heavyweight Championship seven times. Another fact is that Rivera challenged for multiple important junior heavyweight championships around the world including The WWC junior title, the UWA junior lightweight title in Mexico, the WWF junior title, the NWA junior title vs Dennis Brown in 1985, The ICW junior title vs Ray Odissey.

Different Feuds:

Rivera had important feuds during his career specially as a junior and as a tag team wrestler. Stand out feuds against Eric Embry, Chicky Starr, The Mexican Angel, The Sheepherders and The Raging Bull Manny Fernandez, and great matches versus Randy savage, The Super Black Ninja, (a.k.a. as the Great Muta), Dory Funk,Jr., David Shultz, Don Kent, Johnny Rodz, Jose Estrada, Sr., El Gran Mendoza, Pierroth Jr., Bronco #1.

Incident with Manny Fernandez:

In May 1988, at Pedro Rodriguez Gaya Boxing Coliseum in Catano, Puerto Rico, Rivera had a match against Manny Fernández that for many fans was the beginning of the end of Rivera's career. On TV tapings that night, Fernandez, managed by Chicky Starr, was challenging for top competition. he was challenging Invader 1 for a match and suddenly Invader 3(Rivera) came over and accept the challenge instead Invader 1. After a few minutes of an action-packed match, Rivera was seriously injured by a knee strike from the third rope by Fernandez that send Invader 3 to the hospital, putting him out of action for months. That match still one of the most viewed matches on social media even more than 25 after. Three months later, in August 1988, he returned to take revenge against Fernandez manager Chicky Starr due to Fernandez wasn't still in the promotion. he returned on a WWC Event at Hiram Bithorn Stadium in San Juan, PR at the TV tapings of the weekly WWC Super Estrellas de la Lucha Libre tv program section named The Chicky Starr Sport's Shop, to encourage Chicky and take vengeance. Chicky invited Super Medic #1 to the section and Rivera enter with a Medics mask, in the Medic's car attacking Chicky with a 2x4 opening his forehead with more than 25 stitches. Weeks later they had a match at WWC Anniversary show 1988 at Juan Ramon Stadium in Bayamon, Puerto Rico. One year later, on October 1989 Rivera had his revenge match against Fernandez at WWC Anniversary show 1989 in Bayamon, Puerto Rico. He continued in wrestling few years after that wrestling occasionally in big events, not as active as before due to physical conditions related to the Fernadez incident injuries and others. In 1988 he returned to the scene having matches sporadically until early 2000s when he retired. Rivera also is known as a wrestling teacher and trainer responsible for careers like former WWC Universal Heavyweight champion and Lucha Libre AAA Worldwide star The Mecha Wolf, former WWC and IWA Puerto Rico Women's champion Amazona and others. On June 30, 2012, the World Wrestling Council dedicated the WWC Anniversary Show 2012 to The Invaders, including him and the other members of The Invaders dynasty, #1 Jose Gonzalez, #2 Roberto Soto and #4 Maelo Huertas. the event was celebrated at Ruben Rodriguez Coliseum in Bayamon, Puerto Rico.

== Championships and accomplishments ==
- Pro Wrestling Illustrated
  - PWI ranked him # 313 of the 500 best singles wrestlers of the PWI 500 in 1998
- Universal Wrestling Association
  - UWA World Junior Light Heavyweight Championship (1 time)
- World Wrestling Council
  - WWC World Tag Team Championship (3 times) - with Invader I (3)
  - WWC World Junior Heavyweight Championship (7 times)
- World Wrestling League
  - Salón de los Inmortales (class of 2015)

== Luchas de Apuestas record ==
Winner (wager)	Loser (wager)	Location	Event	Date	Notes
Mano Negra (mask)	Invader 3 (mask)	Naucalpan, Mexico	Live event	February 20, 1983	
