= Parque Yldefonso Solá Morales =

Baseball stadium in Caguas, Puerto Rico

Coordinates: 18.2262229°N 66.0341835°W

Parque Yldefonso Solá Morales is a baseball stadium in Caguas, Puerto Rico. It serves as the home field of the Criollos de Caguas. The stadium has a capacity of 10,000 people.

The hockey events for the 2010 Central American and Caribbean Games were held there. The stadium is named after the senator Yldefonso Solá Morales.

In 2018, the stadium was closed and was expected to be demolished. However, a renovation plan was ultimately approved for the installation and was set to begin at end of 2021.
