= Carlos Colón =

Puerto Rican professional wrestler and promoter (born 1948)

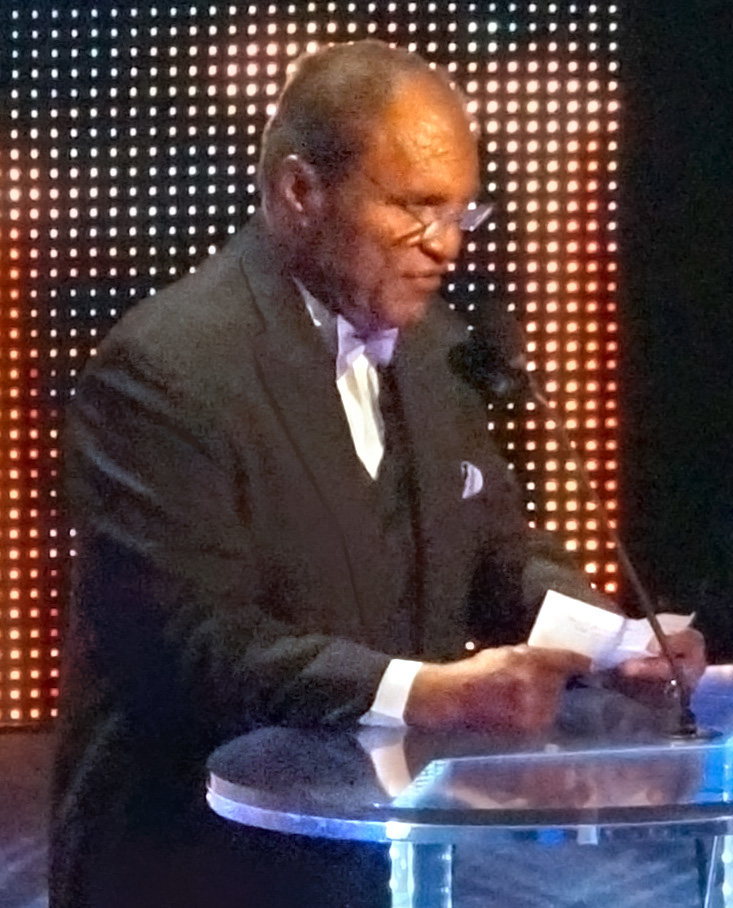
- Colón at the WWE Hall of Fame in 2014

Personal information
- Born: Carlos Edwin Colón Gonzalez; July 18, 1948 (age 78) Santa Isabel, Puerto Rico
- Spouse: Nancy Colón
- Children: 4, including Carlito and Primo
- Relative: Epico Colón (nephew)

Professional wrestling career
- Ring name(s): Carlos Belafonte; Carlitos Colón; Carlos Colón; Prince Kukuya
- Billed height: 5 ft 10 in (178 cm)
- Billed weight: 246 lb (112 kg)
- Billed from: Santa Isabel, Puerto Rico
- Debut: February 16, 1966
- Retired: September 27, 2014

Carlos Edwin Colón González Sr. (born July 18, 1948) is a Puerto Rican wrestling promoter and retired professional wrestler, better known as Carlitos Colón or simply Carlos Colón. He is, along with Victor Jovica, an owner of the Puerto Rican wrestling promotion World Wrestling Council (WWC), where he has held the WWC Universal Heavyweight Championship a record 26 times. He is the patriarch of the Colón wrestling family, composed of his sons Carlos and Eddie, daughter Stacy and nephew Orlando. In 2014, he was inducted into the WWE Hall of Fame and the following year into the Wrestling Observer Newsletter Hall of Fame.

== Professional wrestling career ==
=== Early years (1966–1973) ===
Due to his admiration for wrestlers Antonino Rocca and Miguel Pérez, Colón became a member at the gym they trained at in New York, practicing wrestling moves and cleaning the place occasionally to pay his dues. His dedication and affability helped him gain the respect of his peers, as well as the occasional wrestling match. His first bout occurred in Boston, Massachusetts, on February 16, 1966, when he wrestled Hobo Brazil. Colon was paid US$15.00 for his participation in his first match. He eventually became an itinerant wrestler in the eastern states of the United States and in Canada, including 1 match in the World Wide Wrestling Federation (WWWF) in December 1967, and several in 1968. Over the following three years, with Montreal as his place of residence.

=== Capitol Sport Promotions/World Wrestling Council (1973–1993) ===
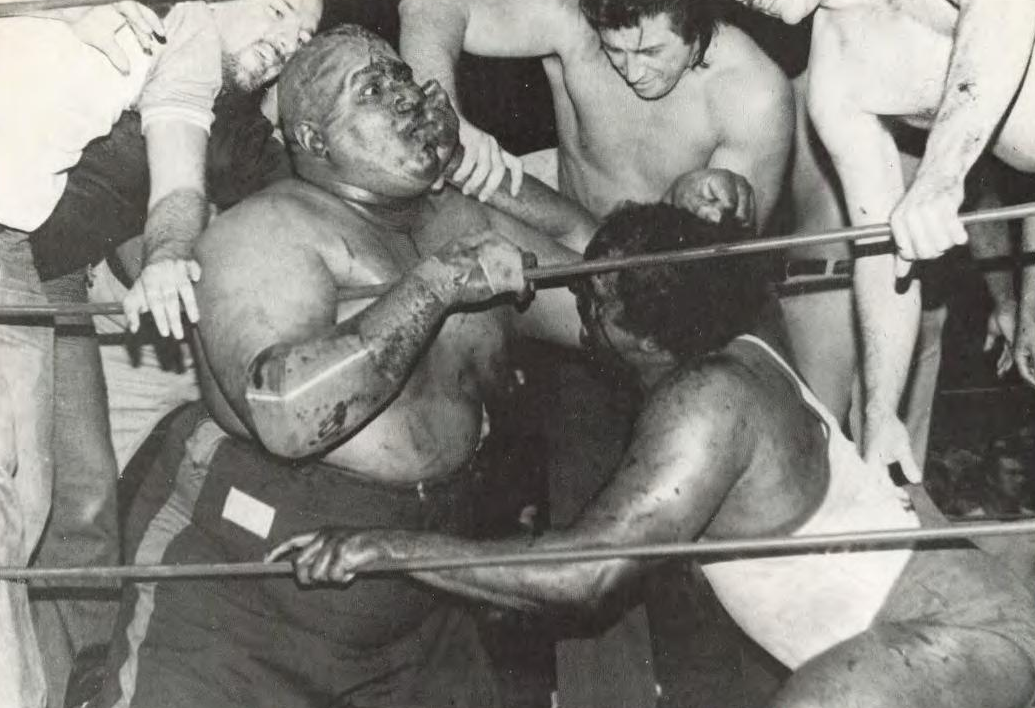
Wrestlers try to breakup a fight between Abdullah (left) and Colón (right)

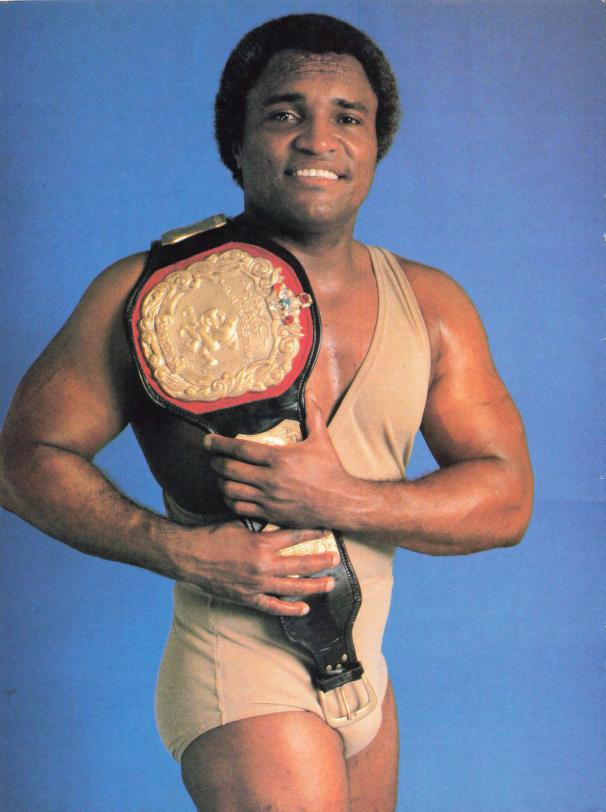
Colón as WWC Universal Heavyweight Champion

Feeling homesick and noticing a void in the Puerto Rican wrestling scene, Colón returned to Puerto Rico in 1973. Colón and Croatian-born wrestler Victor Jovica founded a promotional company, Capitol Sports Promotions, which aired wrestling television shows each Saturday and Sunday on WAPA-TV. He wrestled during a time when local stars such as Barrabas, Black Georgie, and Miguel Pérez Sr. shared the spotlight with international wrestlers such as Argentine-born Rocca, Cuban-born Huracán Castillo and others. He set the stage for local stars such as Los Super Médicos, Los Invaders and Chicky Starr to develop. His wrestling company was also responsible for inviting major American wrestling stars such as Randy Savage, Ric Flair, Bruiser Brody, Stan Hansen and others to wrestle in Puerto Rico. The nemesis of Colón's character was Abdullah the Butcher, with whom he staged a long-standing feud which lasted almost two decades. Colón is quoted as saying: "Eighty percent of the blood I've shed in the ring I've shed because of Abdullah."

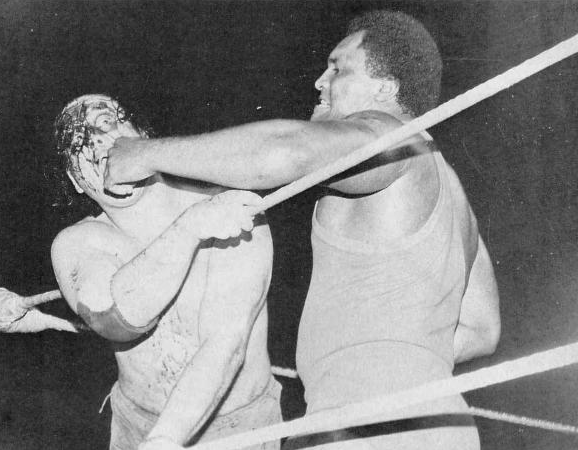
Colon (right) punches Kendo Nagasaki (left), circa 1983

On January 6, 1983, Colón defeated Ric Flair in a match for the NWA World Heavyweight Championship. However, the outcome of this match was not made official or aired on NWA television. Flair received the belt back in a phantom title change that took place on January 23, 1983. Later that year, Colón required hospitalization due to injury following a match against Bruiser Brody. This loss was publicized and made the covers of El Nuevo Día and El Vocero, both of which are mainstream newspapers. Two weeks later, Colón defeated Brody in a rematch. In December 1983, Capitol Sports Promotions began a feud between Colón and Flair, which included a skit where the NWA champion criticized Capitol's title claiming that he was the only "real world champion", leading to a steel cage match to determine the "undisputed champion of the Universe". The encounter headlined an event held in Bayamón on December 18, 1983. Colón won cleanly, and the WWC World Heavyweight Championship was renamed to Universal Heavyweight Championship as a result. In subsequent interviews, Flair has stated that the NWA title was not on the line for this match because an official unification was proposed, but he vetoed it.

On January 24, 1993, Colón made a one-night return to the WWF, then known by the abbreviated name World Wrestling Federation, making an appearance in the Royal Rumble. After this, he decided to temporarily retire from professional wrestling, choosing to help train his sons, Carly, and Eddie, who have followed Colón into the sport.

=== Later years and retirement (1993–present) ===
Carlos Colón appeared on the September 11, 2006, episode of WWE Raw from Madison Square Garden in the audience cheering his son Carly, known as Carlito in WWE. He also negotiated a deal for his other son Eddie Colón to work for World Wrestling Entertainment.

Colón held a retirement ceremony at Aniversario 2008, which was organized in the José Miguel Agrelot Coliseum on July 19, 2008.

However, Colón left this retirement on September 8, 2012, defeating Félix "Barrabás" López in his return. After Carly Colón turned on him and gained control of the heel faction, Colón joined Gilbert Cruz and Ray González in a three-on-three match against his son, López and Germán Figueroa, but his team lost. On February 9, 2013, he lost to Savio Vega in a match for WWC's ownership. This evolved into a feud with the heel faction, while a secondary storyline involved a legal battle over the promotion. Colón defeated José Huertas González to recover ownership of WWC, but lost a rematch the following month. At Aniversario 2013 he teamed with Stacy Colón and defeated José Huertas González and "La Tigresa" Soldelina Vargas. Colón announced another short-lived retirement. He returned at Lockout 2013, resuming this feud by losing to Huertas González in an ambulance match, with both wrestling a no contest at Euphoria 2014.

Colón's name began being rumored as a possible inductee to the WWE Hall of Fame in late 2011. Despite expressing joy at the idea of accompanying Pedro Morales, he dismissed this as a rumor and noted that WWE personnel had not formally contacted him. Ultimately, the 2012 Class did not include him. The following year, Eddie and Orlando Colón noted that they supported a potential induction. On March 11, 2014, Colón was officially announced as part of that year's class. He considered it the "realization of a dream" and admitted that at one point, he began to doubt that he was ever being inducted. This class was completed by Ultimate Warrior, Jake Roberts, Lita, Paul Bearer, and Mr. T. He was inducted by his sons Eddie and Carly, and nephew, Orlando in the official ceremony held at the Smoothie King Center in New Orleans, Louisiana. Colón became the third Puerto Rican inducted, the first being Morales and the second being Johnny Rodz. WWC held a series of homages, the first of which was held by his immediate family. A more formal ceremony was held on March 30, 2014, and included the participation of long-time rival Chicky Starr, who participated in a skit where he expressed his respect and ended their animosity. The promotion went on to announce a Puerto Rico-wide tour, "La Despedida de Carlitos Colón", which would mark Colón's final retirement. On September 27, 2014, in the match of Mighty Ursus, which was a non-title match, Carlos Colón, who was going to serve as a special guest referee, was revealed as Ursu's mystery opponent. During the match, he applied the figure four hold to Ursus and then turned Carlos around until he surrendered, making this the last match of the Eternal Acrobat of Puerto Rico.

== Personal life ==
Colón was born in the Jauca Ward of Santa Isabel an agricultural community in southern Puerto Rico. One of seven children, he emigrated to Brooklyn, New York in 1961 along with the rest of the family led there by his mother, Esther González. Colón is married to a Canadian national named Nancy, who is the mother of his children, Carly, Eddie, Stacy, and Melissa. He is the brother of accountant José Colón, who has made several non-wrestling appearances in WWC and is also the father of his nephew and fellow wrestler, Orlando Colón, known by the ring name of Epico. Colón's career has left him with over 70 scars on his forehead. He has publicly stated that he exhibits them with pride, considering them the proof that reflects the arduous work done during all of the bloody bouts in which he has been involved.

Colón is WWE's representative in Puerto Rico, promoting the house shows held by the company there. He has appeared on WWE programming, including the December 24, 2009, episode of WWE Superstars where he supported Eddie, known as Primo in WWE. Afterward, Colón made another appearance for WWE, attending its 2012 WWE Hall of Fame ceremony. He attended as a guest of his son and nephew, who held the WWE Tag Team Championship at that time. Colón's main interest was to see the inductions of Yokozuna and Mil Máscaras, both of whom worked for him in Capitol Sports Promotions.

Colón was in the building the night that Bruiser Brody was killed. Colón testified on behalf of José González, who had killed Brody during a dressing-room altercation, and continued to employ him for many years after the event.

== Legacy ==
When Colón was first nominated for induction into the Puerto Rican Sports Hall of Fame (Spanish: Pabellón de la Fama del Deporte Puertorriqueño) in 2023, a number of athletes from other sports supported his inclusion, including baseball player Yadier Molina, judo Panamerican champion Luis Martínez, basketball players Julio Toro and Ricardo Dalmau and Olympic medalist Jaime Espinal. All of them justified his inclusion by suggesting that while the outcomes of professional wrestling matches is predetermined, it still requires physical exertion and conditioning, general athleticism and at least a basic knowledge of actual grappling. Basketball coach Wilhelmus Caanen considered Colón “Tito Trinidad before Tito Trinidad”, in reference to former boxing world champion Félix Trinidad, whose wins would often gather impromptu celebrations on a massive scale during the 1990s and early 2000s. Fellow coach Allans Colón called him “an institution in [Puerto Rico]” and the local reference for anything involving professional wrestling.

== Championships and accomplishments ==
- Funking Conservatory
  - FC Tag Team Championship (1 time) – with Eddie Colón
- International World Class Championship Wrestling
  - IWCCW Heavyweight Championship (1 time)
- Stampede Wrestling
  - NWA International Tag Team Championship (Calgary version) (1 time) – with Gino Caruso
- Pro Wrestling Illustrated
  - PWI ranked him # 39 of the 500 best singles wrestlers of the "PWI Years" in 2003.
- World Wrestling Council
  - WWC Universal Heavyweight Championship (26 times)
  - NWA World Heavyweight Championship (1 time)^{+}
  - WWC North American Heavyweight Championship (9 times)
  - WWC Puerto Rico Championship (9 times)
  - WWC North American Tag Team Championship (11 times) – with Miguel Perez (2), Jose Rivera (2), Gino Caruso (1), Bob Ellis (1), Victor Jovica (1), Chief Thunder Cloud (1), Huracán Castillo (1), Eric Froelich (1), and Invader I (1)
  - WWC World Junior Heavyweight Championship (3 times)
  - WWC World Tag Team Championship (3 times) – with Jose Rivera (1), Pedro Morales (1), and Invader I (1)
  - WWC Television Championship (4 times)
  - WWC Hardcore Championship (2 times)
- Wrestling Observer Newsletter
  - Wrestling Observer Newsletter Hall of Fame (Class of 2015)
- WWE
  - WWE Hall of Fame (Class of 2014)

1 Colón's reign is not recognized by the National Wrestling Alliance.

== Luchas de Apuestas record ==
Winner (wager)	Loser (wager)	Location	Event	Date	Notes
Golden Boy (mask)	Carlos Colón (hair)	Caguas, Puerto Rico	WWC show	July 14, 1997	

== In other media ==
He is portrayed by Jaime Espinal a Dominican-born Puerto Rican freestyle wrestler in the Eduardo “Transfor” Ortiz movie Las Super Estrellas de la Lucha Libre, based on Puerto Rican wrestling in Puerto Rico in the 1980s.

== See also ==
- The Colóns
- Primo & Epico
- List of Puerto Ricans
- Professional wrestling in Puerto Rico
