= Angel Maravilla =

Dominican professional wrestler

Personal information
- Born: Domingo Martínez Molina; 1934 Dominican Republic
- Died: November 12, 2006

Professional wrestling career
- Ring name(s): Huracán Castillo; La Enciclopedia Huracán Castillo; Fidel Castillo; Joe Castro; Cyclone Castro; Huracán Castillo Sr.
- Billed height: 6 ft 2 in (1.88 m)
- Billed weight: 234 lb (106 kg)

Domingo Martínez Molina was a Dominican professional wrestler known as Angel Maravilla and Raoul Castillo in Puerto Rico, Canada, the United States, and the World Wrestling Federation during the 1970s and 1980s.

== Career ==
In 1972, he began teaming with his "brother" Fidel in Cleveland. They worked in Puerto Rico, Montreal, Calgary and Japan.

Maravilla wrestled for the World Wrestling Federation (WWF) in 1980. At Showdown at Shea (1980), Maravilla defeated Jose Estrada. He left the WWF in 1981.

== Championships and accomplishments ==
- Stampede Wrestling
  - Stampede International Tag Team Championship (1 time) with Huracán Castillo
- World Wrestling Council
  - WWC Caribbean Heavyweight Championship (1 time)
  - WWC North American Tag Team Championship (1 time) - with Huracan Castillo (1)
