= Joe Bravo =

Joe Bravo may refer to:

- Joe Bravo (wrestler), Puerto Rican wrestler
- Joe Bravo (jockey) (born 1971), American jockey
