= Laredo Kid =

Mexican professional wrestler (born 1986)

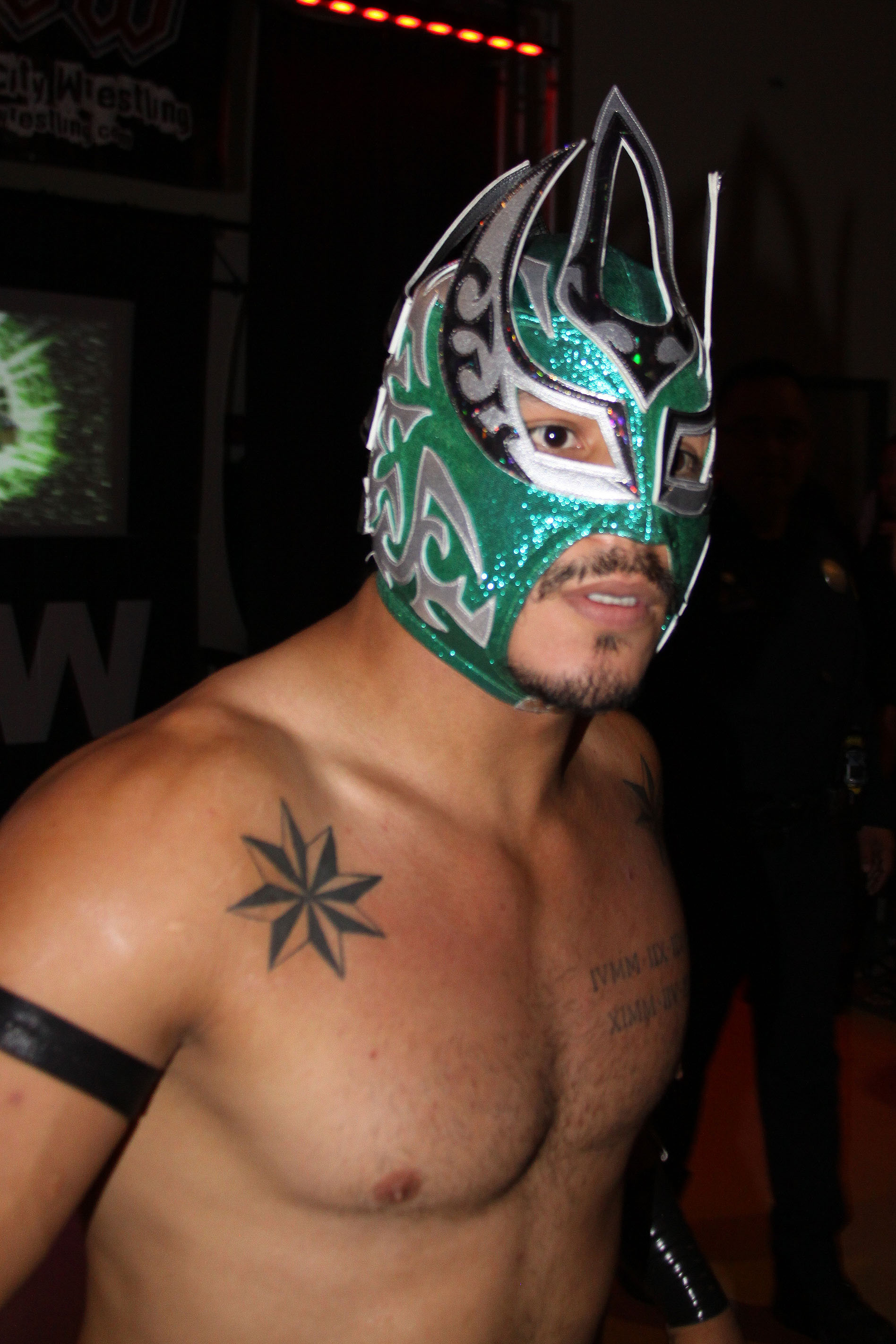
- Laredo Kid in 2018

Personal information
- Born: December 30, 1986 (age 39) Nuevo Laredo, Tamaulipas, Mexico

Professional wrestling career
- Ring name(s): The Exterminador; Laredo; Laredo Kid; Tony Guevara
- Billed height: 165 cm (5 ft 5 in)
- Billed weight: 80 kg (176 lb)
- Billed from: Nuevo Laredo, Tamaulipas, Mexico
- Trained by: Marvik; El Albanil; El Hechicero/Muerte Subita
- Debut: 2003

Laredo Kid (born December 30, 1986) is a Mexican professional wrestler. He is signed to WWE, under Lucha Libre AAA Worldwide, where in AAA, he is one-half of the current AAA World Mixed Tag Team Champions with La Hiedra in their first reign as a team; it is Kid's first individual reign. He is also a former two-time AAA World Cruiserweight Champion. He is best known for his tenure with Total Nonstop Action Wrestling (TNA), where he is a former one-time TNA Digital Media Champion.

Laredo Kid's real name is not a matter of public record, as is often the case with masked wrestlers in Mexico where private lives are kept a secret from wrestling fans. Laredo Kid originally used the ring name The Exterminador but changed it to "Laredo Kid" after a year. He signed with AAA in 2005 and worked for them for several years before leaving the promotion to work on the Mexican Independent circuit.

== Professional wrestling career ==
The wrestler that would later be known as Laredo Kid made his professional wrestling debut in 2003, under the name "Exterminador". He would often wrestle against his brother "Oscuridad" and would work alongside his uncle and trainer Muerte Subita (also known as "El Hechicero"). He worked on the Mexican independent circuit until early 2005.

=== Asistencia Asesoría y Administración (2005–2011) ===
After signing with Asistencia Asesoría y Administración (AAA) in 2005 he was repackaged as "Laredo Kid", named after his home town of Nuevo Laredo, Tamaulipas. Laredo Kid's first notable appearance for AAA was at the 2005 Verano de Escandalo where he teamed up with Los Barrio Boys (Alan, Billy Boy and Decniss) in a loss to Gran Apache and the Black Family (Cuervo, Escoria and Ozz). In December 2005 Laredo Kid teamed with Hombre sin Miedo, Principe Zafiro and Rey Cometa in a loss to Kaoma Jr., Oscuridad (Laredo Kid's brother), Rio Bravo and Tito Santana at the 2005 Guerra de Titanes. Subsequently, Laredo Kid and Hombre sin Miedo teamed up to win the Taumalipas State tag team championship. Following Guerra de Titanes Laredo Kid and Rey Cometa was joined by Super Fly, Nemesis, Pegasso and Aero Star to form the group Real Fuerza Aérea, a group of colorful, masked young high fliers.

On March 10, 2006, Real Fuerza Aérea made their first appearance as a group at a major AAA event when Laredo Kid, Super Fly and Nemesis lost to Los Diabolicos (Angel Mortal, Mr. Condor and Gallego) at the 2006 Rey de Reyes show. Three months later Real Fuerza Aérea (this time consisting of Laredo Kid, Nemesis, Super Fly and Rey Cometa) challenged the Black Family (Chessman, Cuervo, Escoria and Ozz) for the Mexican National Atómicos Championship at Triplemanía XIV. The match ended in a "No contest", causing the championship to be declared vacant. At a subsequent television taping the Black Family defeated Real Fuerza Aérea and reclaim the title.

In the fall of 2006 AAA held a tournament called Luchando Por un Sueño, or "the Dream Tournament" in English where low and mid-card wrestlers competed in a 12-man single elimination tournament. Laredo Kid defeated Mr. Condor in the opening round and Pesadilla in the semi-finals to earn a spot in the finals as the 2006 Verano de Escandalo. On September 17, 2006, Laredo Kid defeated both Kaoma, Jr. and Gran Apache to win the Luchando Por un Sueño tournament, the only one of its kind so far. At the 2006 Guerra de Titanes Laredo Kid along with El Brazo, Jr., El Ángel and El Elegido lost to Los Vipers (Abismo Negro, Antifaz, Charly Manson and Histeria).

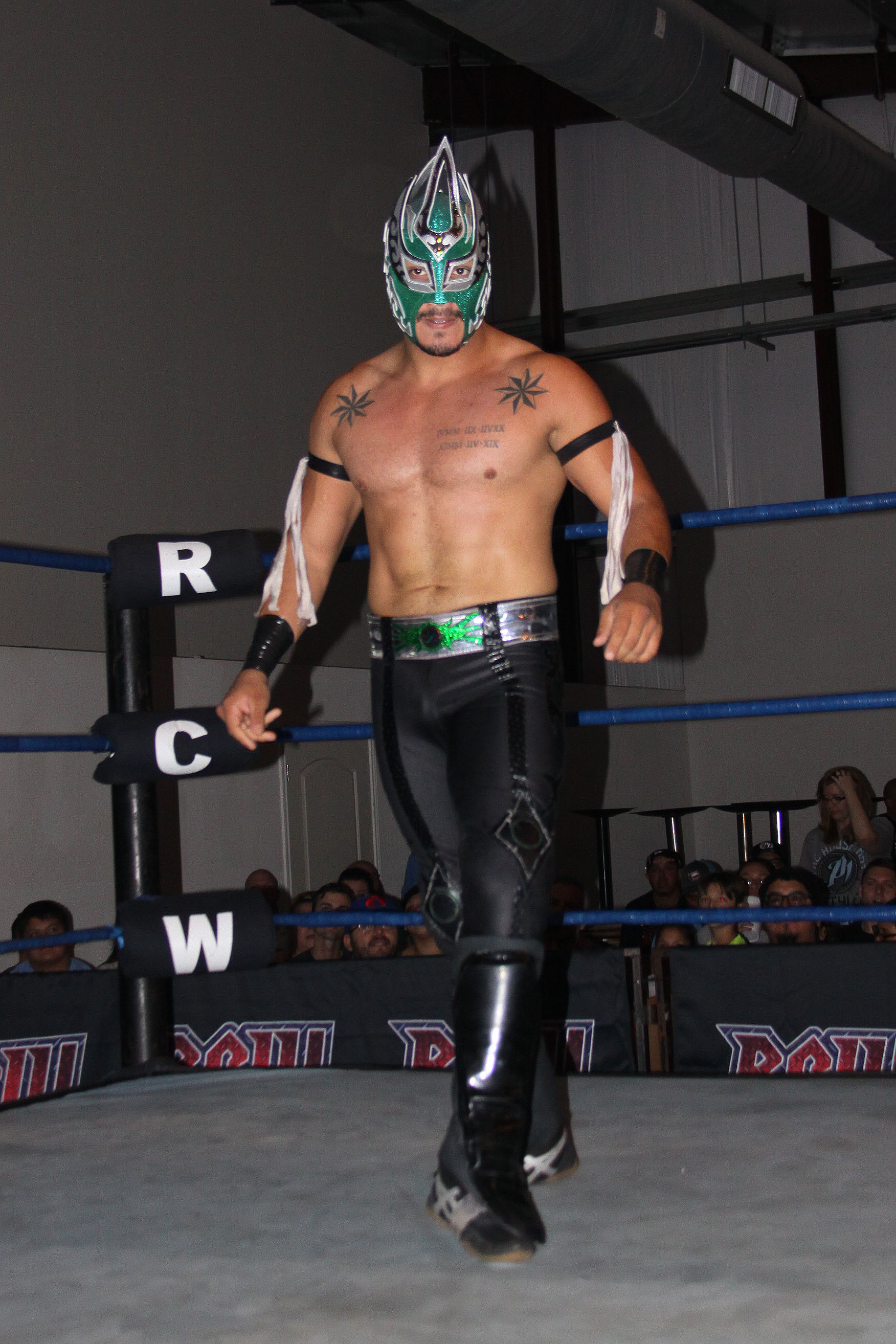
Laredo Kid in the ring

Laredo Kid was one of the participants in the original Alas de Oro (Spanish for "Wings of Gold"), but was eliminated by eventual winner Extreme Tiger. At Triplemanía XV Laredo Kid and Gran Apache defeated Super Fly and Super Caló in a Relevos Suicidas tag team match. Losing the match forced Super Fly to wrestle Super Calo in a Lucha de Apuesta, mask vs. mask match. In August 2008 Laredo Kid, along with El Oriental, Histeria and Antifaz traveled to Japan to compete on Pro Wrestling Noah's 2007 "Shiny Navigation" tour that ran over ten events from August 19, 2007, until September 2, 2009. On most nights Laredo Kid teamed with El Oriental against Histeria and Antifaz, sometimes in six-man matches teaming with Ricky Marvin while Histeria and Antifaz teamed with Rocky Romero. On September 3, 2009, on the last night in Japan Laredo Kid teamed with Super Fly to defeat Atsushi Aoki and Ippei Ota on a joint AAA/NOAH show called TripleSEM. Two weeks later Latin Lover, La Parka and Ricky Marvin to defeat the La Legión Extranjera team of Abismo Negro, Ron Killings, Kenzo Suzuki and X-Pac in one of the feature matches on the 2007 Verano de Escandalo event. Laredo Kid got the winning pinfall on X-Pac, Laredo Kid's biggest win to date.

At the 2007 Antonio Peña Memorial Show Laredo Kid suffered a severe leg injury during a match. He was participating in the Copa Antonio Peña Gauntlet match, wrestling Ron Killings when a Huracanrana off the top rope went wrong and Killings landed on Laredo Kid's leg, breaking it. The injury kept Laredo Kid out of the ring until early 2008.

Laredo Kid returned from his injury in early 2008, in time to join "Team AAA", El Alebrije, Charly Manson and Chavo Guerrero, Sr. at the 2008 Rey de Reyes losing to La Legión Extranjera (Electroshock, Kenzo Suzuki, Sabu and Scott Steiner). On April 14, 2008, Laredo Kid wins his first Lucha de Apuesta, or bet match when a multiman Steel Cage Match came down to him and Jaque Mate with Laredo Kid pinning Jaque Mate, forcing him to have his head shaved after the match. In June 2008 Laredo Kid re-injured his leg during a Lucha de Apuestas match because the steel rod in his leg had not been inserted properly. The match saw Sangre Chicana sacrifice his hair to save the injured Laredo Kid's mask. The injury kept Laredo Kid out of the ring, halting his momentum as both Super Fly and Aero Star became the focus of Real Fuerza Aérea while he was away and continued to work higher profile matches than Laredo Kid after he returned to the ring.

Laredo Kid was one of the 13 competitors in a Domo De La Muerte (Dome of Death) match to determine the competitors in a tournament to crown the first ever AAA Cruiserweight Champion. Laredo Kid defeated Super Fly in the first round but lost to Alan Stone in the semi-final.

=== WWE (2015) ===
On April 7, 2015, Laredo Kid wrestled a tryout match for WWE, which he worked unmasked under the ring name Tony Guevara. Teaming with Sammy Guevara, the two were defeated by Los Matadores.

=== Impact Wrestling (2017–2019) ===
On the March 30, 2017 episode of Impact Wrestling, Laredo Kid made his debut. He teamed up with Garza Jr. in a tag team tournament for the Impact Wrestling world tag team championships. On the June 28, 2019 episode of Impact Wrestling, Laredo Kid and Latin American Exchange (Ortiz & Santana) lost to The Rascalz (Dez, Trey & Wentz). On the July 5 episode of Impact Wrestling, Laredo Kid lost to Rohit Raju.

=== All Elite Wrestling (2019, 2021) ===
On June 29, Laredo Kid made a special appearance at the first AEW Fyter Fest event, replacing Pac teaming with Lucha Brothers (Pentagón Jr. and Rey Fénix), who were defeated by The Elite (Kenny Omega, Matt Jackson and Nick Jackson). On the March 24, 2021 episode of AEW Dynamite, Laredo Kid made his return to team with Lucha Brothers to take on Brandon Cutler and The Young Bucks.

=== Return to Impact Wrestling / Total Nonstop Action Wrestling (2021–2025) ===
==== X Division Championship pursuit (2021–2023) ====
On the September 9, 2021, episode of Before The Impact, Laredo Kid made his return to Impact Wrestling after two years and defeated John Skyler. However, Laredo lost a rematch to Skyler on the September 16 episode of Impact Wrestling. At Victory Road, Laredo Kid defeated Black Taurus, Jake Something, John Skyler, and Trey Miguel in a X Division five-way scramble match. On the September 30 episode of Impact Wrestling, Laredo Kid competed in the first round of a tournament for the vacant X Division Championship, where he lost to Trey Miguel. At Bound for Glory, Laredo Kid competed in the Call Your Shot Gauntlet match which was won by Moose. On the November 4 episode of Impact Wrestling, Kid defeated Black Taurus, Rohit Raju, and Steve Maclin in a X Division four-way match to become the #1 contender for the X Division Championship at Turning Point. However, Kid lost a match to Maclin on the November 18 episode of Impact Wrestling, due to which Maclin was added in Kid's title match against Trey Miguel at Turning Point, making it a three-way match for the title. Kid failed to win the title as Miguel retained.

Kid was a mainstay in the X Division and continued to pursue the X Division Championship. At Hard To Kill on January 8, 2022, Kid competed in a X Division four-way match, won by Mike Bailey. At Under Siege, Kid was featured in another X-Division match, a three-way contest against Bailey and Rich Swann, which Swann won. On the May 19 episode of Impact!, Kid lost to Mike Bailey in an Ultimate X match qualifier for the X Division Championship at Slammiversary. On the June 30 episode of Impact!, Kid competed in a X Division four-way match to determine the #1 contender match for the X Division Championship at Against All Odds. Trey Miguel won the match. At Against All Odds, Kid lost to Black Taurus. Kid received another opportunity to earn a X Division Championship opportunity in a X Division Triple Threat Revolver match at Victory Road. Frankie Kazarian went on to win the match. On the October 27 episode of Before the Impact, Laredo Kid participated in a tournament for the X Division Championship but was defeated by Black Taurus.

Kid returned to Impact after a hiatus on the April 13, 2023, episode of Impact Wrestling, and defeated Black Taurus, Lince Dorado and Rich Swann in a X Division four-way match. On the night one of Impact 1000, Kid participated in a Feast or Fired match but failed to win any briefcase. At the UltraClash co-promoted show between Impact and AAA, Laredo Kid teamed with Tommy Dreamer to defeat Taurus and Brian Myers.

==== Digital Media Champion and Aztec Warriors (2024–2025) ====
At Hard To Kill on January 13, 2024, the first promoted event under the TNA rebranding, Laredo Kid teamed with Mike Bailey to challenge ABC (Ace Austin and Chris Bey) in a four-way match for the TNA World Tag Team Championship, also involving Grizzled Young Veterans (James Drake and Zack Gibson) and The Rascalz (Trey Miguel and Zachary Wentz). ABC retained the titles. Shortly after, Kid moved onto a feud with Crazzy Steve over the TNA Digital Media Championship. Kid unsuccessfully challenged Steve for the title on the April 11 episode of Impact!, by losing via disqualification. However, Kid defeated Steve in a rematch at Rebellion on April 20. Kid held the title for only a month, retaining against KC Navarro at Under Siege, before losing the title to AJ Francis on the 20th anniversary of Impact!.

Following the title loss, Laredo Kid returned to X Division, as he defeated Bhupinder Gujjar and Jai Vidal in a X Division three-way match on the August 22 episode of Impact!, and qualified for an Ultimate X match for the X Division Championship at Emergence, where Zachary Wentz won the title. At Bound for Glory, Kid participated in a Call Your Shot Gauntlet match to earn a future title shot of choosing. Frankie Kazarian won the match. At Turning Point, Laredo unsuccessfully challenged Moose for the X Division Championship.

On March 14, 2025, at Sacrifice, Laredo began to team with Octagón Jr. as the Aztec Warriors, as the two were defeated by Fir$t Cla$$ (AJ Francis and KC Navarro). Around this time, his ring name in TNA was shortened to simply Laredo. Aztec Warriors would gain revenge against Fir$t Cla$$ by teaming with Chavo Guerrero Jr. to defeat Frankie Kazarian and Fir$t Cla$$ in a six-man tag team match on the March 27 episode of Impact!. Aztec Warriors would rebound by winning matches against teams like The Great Hands (Jason Hotch and John Skyler) and The Northern Armory (Judas Icarus and Travis Williams).

On October 6, 2025, Laredo Kid Announced his departure from TNA.

=== Return to WWE (2025–present) ===
Laredo Kid made his return to WWE on the May 27, 2025, episode of NXT, appearing in the crowd to reveal himself as a participant in the fatal 4-Way match for the NXT North American Championship at the WWE and AAA event Worlds Collide. At the event on June 7, Laredo Kid failed to win the title against defending champion Ethan Page, Je'Von Evans and Rey Fenix.

== In other media ==
In the late summer of 2019, Laredo Kid was one of the participants in the Mexican version of the Exathlon sports reality show, Laredo Kid was part of the "celebrity/athlete" Exathlon team, competing against a team of amateurs that was shown several days a week on the Mexican Azteca Uno television station.

== Championships and accomplishments ==
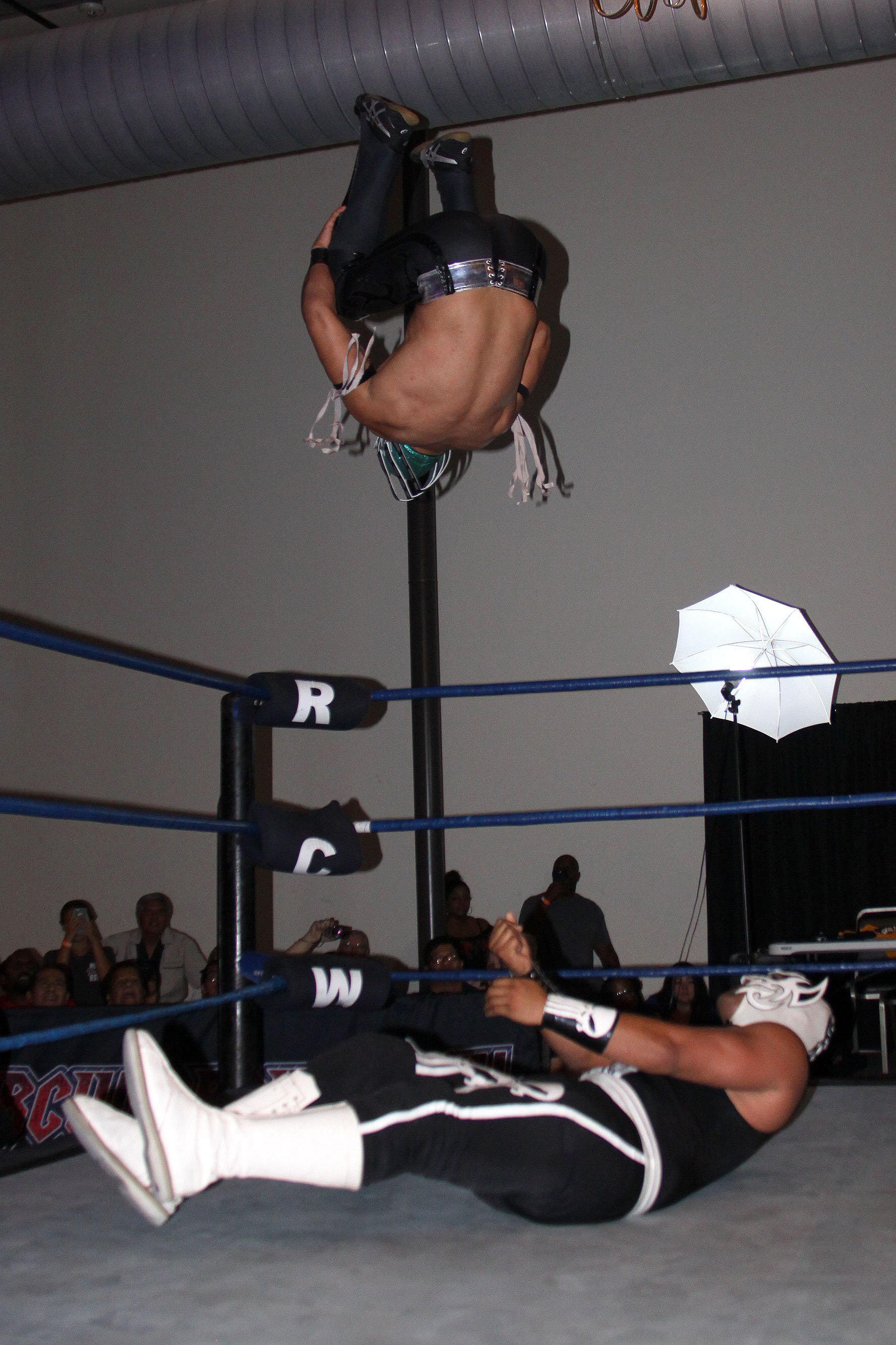
Laredo Kid performing a 450 splash

- Lucha Maniaks
  - Lucha Maniaks Championship (1 time)
  - Lucha Maniaks International Championship (1 time)
- Llaves y Candados
  - LyC Cruiserweight Championship (1 time)
- Lucha Libre AAA Worldwide
  - AAA World Cruiserweight Championship (2 times)
  - AAA World Trios Championship (1 time) – with El Hijo del Vikingo and Myzteziz Jr.
  - AAA World Mixed Tag Team Championship (1 time, current) – with La Hiedra
  - Luchando Por un Sueño Tournament (2006)
  - Lucha Capital (2018 Men's)
  - Rey de Reyes (2021)
  - AAA Showcenter Tournament (2022)
  - Lucha Libre World Cup: 2023 Men's division – with Pentagón Jr. and Taurus
- Maximum Assault Wrestling
  - MAW Championship (3 times)
- Pro Wrestling Illustrated
  - Ranked No. 22 of the top 500 singles wrestlers in the PWI 500 in 2021
- Pro Wrestling Blitz
  - PWB Tag Team Championship (1 time) – with Garza Jr.
- RGR Lucha Libre
  - RGR Supremo Championship (1 time, current)
- Total Nonstop Action Wrestling
  - TNA Digital Media Championship (1 time)
- World Wrestling League
  - WWL Americas Championship (1 time)
- Other championships
  - Tamaulipas State Tag Team Championship (1 time) – with Hombre Sin Miedo

== Luchas de Apuestas record ==
Winner (wager)	Loser (wager)	Location	Event	Date	Notes
Laredo Kid (mask)	Jaque Mate (hair)	Nuevo Laredo, Tamaulipas	Live event	April 14, 2008	
Laredo Kid (mask)	Sangre Chicana (hair)	Nuevo Laredo, Tamaulipas	Live event	June 6, 2008	(Note: This was a Cage match that also included Hombre Sin Miedo, Ozz, Cuervo, and Escoria. Laredo Kid was injured before the end of the match and Sangre Chicana sacrificed his hair to save Laredo's mask.)
Laredo Kid (mask)	Guerrero Negro Jr. (hair)	Fort Worth, Texas	Live event	April 26, 2015	(Note: The match also included Sangre Chicana and Scorpio Jr.)
