= WWC Caribbean Heavyweight Championship =

Professional wrestling championship

Details
- Promotion: L&G Promotions; Universal Wrestling Promotions; World Wrestling Council; Wrestling International New Generations
- Date established: May 25, 1968

Other names
- L&G Caribbean Heavyweight Championship; UWP Caribbean Heavyweight Championship; NWA Caribbean Heavyweight Championship; W*ING/WWC Caribbean Heavyweight Championship
Statistics
- First champion: Jose Lothario
- Most reigns: Invader (5 reigns)
- Longest reign: Abdullah the Butcher (1687 days)
- Oldest champion: Ray Apollon (52 years)
- Youngest champion: Tony Atlas (17 years)
- Heaviest champion: Abdullah the Butcher (430 lb (200 kg; 31 st))
- Lightest champion: Yukihiro Kanemura (196 lb (89 kg; 14.0 st))

The WWC Caribbean Heavyweight Championship is a secondary title contested for in the Puerto Rican professional wrestling promotion, the World Wrestling Council (WWC).

The title has been in use since 1975. Prior to being defended in the WWC, it was defended in L&G Promotions, until 1977, when the title moved to the WWC after L&G closed. For a time, the title was defended in the W*ING promotion in Japan as the W*ING/WWC Caribbean Heavyweight Championship. Throughout the years, the championship has been used on and off in WWC, although it was a mainstay of the promotion and defended regularly until the mid-1990s. It was revived roughly from January 6, 1996 later on 1997 before being abandoned. More than six years later in September 29, 2001, the WWC began contesting bouts for the championship once more. However, the revival of the championship would be relatively short and it was rendered inactive in late September 7, 2002 and hasn't been promoted by the World Wrestling Council since. On September 25, 2010, the title was reactivated and captured by Hideo Saito.

The Caribbean Heavyweight Championship was declared vacated and inactive on March 31, 2012.

== May 2023 reactivated and Tournament announcement ==
May 13, 2023 during a segment on TV show, Superestrellas de la lucha libre, WWC made the announcement they reactivated the title and a tournament be held to crown a new champion.

== Title history ==
Wrestler	Times	Date	Location	Notes	Reference
L&G Caribbean Heavyweight Championship
Jose Lothario	1	1968-05-25	San Juan, Puerto Rico	Defeat Red Bastien via forfeit in tournament final to become first champion.	
Johnny Valentine	1	1968-06-08	San Juan, Puerto Rico		
Jose Lothario	2	1968-10-24	Freeport, Bahamas		
The Gladiator	1	1969-01-18	San Juan, Puerto Rico	Was a first on win two of three falls match.	
Hans Mortier	1	1969-04-05	San Juan Puerto Rico		
Ciclón Negro	1	1969-04-19	San Juan, Puerto Rico		
The Missouri Mauler	1	1970-01-31	San Juan, Puerto Rico		
Jack Brisco	1	1970-05-30	San Juan, Puerto Rico		
UWP Caribbean Heavyweight Championship
Mephistofeles	1	1970-09-31	San Juan, Puerto Rico		
Tony Atlas	1	1971-01-22	Bayamón, Puerto Rico		
Invader II	1	1971-02-08	Las Marías, Puerto Rico		
Tony Atlas	2	1971-11-10	Mayagüez, Puerto Rico		
Black Georgie	1	1972-09-08	San Juan, Puerto Rico		
Hugo Savinovich	1	1973-01-13	San Germán, Puerto Rico		
Black Georgie	2	1973-02-09	San Juan, Puerto Rico		
Invader II	2	1973-05-30	Utuado, Puerto Rico		
Hugo Savinovich	2	1973-07-10	Santa Isabel, Puerto Rico		
Castro Salvaje	1	1974-02-03	Bayamón, Puerto Rico		
Hugo Savinovich	3	1974-05-08	San Juan, Puerto Rico		
Rocky Brewer	1	1974-09-08	Ponce, Puerto Rico		
Huracán Castillo (Pedro Castillo)	1	1974-10-10	Ponce, Puerto Rico		
Rocky Brewer	2	1974-11-05	Cabo Rojo, Puerto Rico		
Toru Tanaka	1	1975-01-04	San Juan, Puerto Rico		
Hugo Savinovich	4	1975-02-08	Bayamón, Puerto Rico		
Jose Lothario	3	1975-03-15	San Juan, Puerto Rico	Lothario began defending the title in Universal Wrestling Promotions after L&G Promotions closes.	
Gran Markus	1	1975-06-14	Aguadilla, Puerto Rico		
José Lothario	4	1975-09-26	Bayamón, Puerto Rico		
Huracán Castillo	2	1976-03-02	Bayamón, Puerto Rico		
Invader III	1	1976-05-03	Bayamón, Puerto Rico		
Huracán Castillo	3	1976-07-20	Bayamón, Puerto Rico	Castillo was the NWA Caribbean Champion when he jumped to the WWC later on May 4, 1977 the title was renamed WWC Caribbean Championship.	
WWC Caribbean Heavyweight Championship
Hercules Ayala	1	1977-06-06	Caguas, Puerto Rico		
Joe Novak	1	1977-12-17	San Juan, Puerto Rico		
Dick Steinborn	1	1978-02-04	San Juan, Puerto Rico		
Invader I	1	1978-02-25	San Juan, Puerto Rico		
Pierre Martel	1	1978-03-11	Bayamón, Puerto Rico		
Invader I	2	1978-04-08	Caguas, Puerto Rico		
Held Up after a match between Invader I and Dick Steinborn on 1978-06-24 in Bayamón, Puerto Rico.
Invader I	3	1978-07-01	Caguas, Puerto Rico	Defeat Dick Steinborn in a rematch.	
Armand Hussein	1	1978-07-15	Caguas, Puerto Rico		
José Rivera	1	1978-08-10	Caguas, Puerto Rico		
Gil Hayes	1	1978-10-21	Bayamón, Puerto Rico		
Chief War Cloud	1	1978-11-25	Bayamón, Puerto Rico		
Don Kent	1	1979-01-06	San Juan, Puerto Rico		
Huracán Castillo	4	1979-07-21	Bayamón, Puerto Rico		
Dick Steinborn	2	1979-08-18	San Juan, Puerto Rico		
Ray Apollon	1	1979-09-15	Trinidad and Tobago		
José Rivera	2	1979-10-13	San Juan, Puerto Rico		
Dick Steinborn	3	1979-11-10	San Juan, Puerto Ricoo		
Ciclón Negro	2	1979-12-09	Bayamón, Puerto Rico		
Gama Singh	1	1980-06-07	San Juan, Puerto Rico		
José Rivera	3	1980-06-28	Caguas, Puerto Rico		
Luke Graham	1	1980-07-19	Caguas, Puerto Rico		
Chief Jay Strongbow	1	1980-10-11	Bayamón, Puerto Rico		
Danny Condrey	1	1980-12-20	San Juan, Puerto Rico		
Maravilla	1	1981-02-09	San Juan, Puerto Rico		
Medic II	1	1981-03-07	Bayamón, Puerto Rico		
Tommy Gilbert	1	1981-03-21	Bayamón, Puerto Rico		
Kim Song	1	1981-05-16	San Juan, Puerto Rico		
Jack Brisco	2	1981-05-30	San Juan, Puerto Rico		
Hans Muller	1	1981-12-20	San Juan, Puerto Rico		
Pierre Martel	2	1982-01-09	Bayamón, Puerto Rico		
"King Kong" Mosca	1	1982-02-20	Bayamón, Puerto Rico		
stripped off on 1982-03-13 when mosca left from WWC due to a problem with Invader. I.
Dick Steinborn	4	1982-04-17	Bayamón, Puerto Rico	Defeat Charlie Cook in a 6-man tournament final.	
Charlie Cook	1	1982-04-31	Bayamón, Puerto Rico		
Abdullah the Butcher	1	1982-08-14	San Juan, Puerto Rico		
Hercules Ayala	2	1987-03-28	Bayamón, Puerto Rico	Also defeat Carlos Colón for the WWC Universal Heavyweight Championship.	
TNT	1	1988-06-18	San Juan, Puerto Rico		
Buddy Landel	1	1988-08-20	Bayamón, Puerto Rico		
TNT	2	1988-09-17	Bayamón, Puerto Rico		
Jason the Terrible	1	1988-11-19	Carolina, Puerto Rico	Also defeat Carlos Colón for the WWC Television Championship on January 28, 1989 in Carolina, Puerto Rico.	
TNT	3	1989-03-11	San Juan, Puerto Rico	Defeat Jason the Terrible for the WWC Caribbean Heavyweight Championship only.	
Rip Rogers	1	1989-05-14	San Juan, Puerto Rico		
Miguel Pérez Jr.	1	1989-11-04	Bayamón, Puerto Rico		
Harley Race	1	1990-01-06	San Juan, Puerto Rico		
Invader I	4	1990-03-04	Mayagüez, Puerto Rico		
Leo Burke	1	1990-05-19	Carolina, Puerto Rico		
Invader I	5	1990-07-07	Bayamón, Puerto Rico		
Kim Duk	1	1990-09-08	Bayamón, Puerto Rico		
El Bronco	1	1990-12-15	Bayamón, Puerto Rico		
Kim Duk	2	1991-01-12?	Humacao, Puerto Rico		
Miguel Pérez Jr.	2	1991-02-16	Ponce, Puerto Rico?		
Scott Hall	1	1991-03-02	Bayamón, Puerto Rico		
Super Medic III	1	1991-04-20	Aguadilla, Puerto Rico		
Rod Price	1	1991-07-05	San Germán, Puerto Rico		
Super Medic III	2	1991-07-13	Caguas, Puerto Rico		
Fidel Sierra	1	1991-08-03	Bayamón, Puerto Rico	Defeat TNT for the WWC Television Championship on October 19, 1991 in Bayamón, Puerto Rico.	
Miguel Pérez Jr.	3	1991-12-08	Carolina, Puerto Rico		
Greg Valentine	1	1991-12-25	San Juan, Puerto Rico		
Miguel Pérez Jr.	4	1992-01-06	San Juan, Puerto Rico		
W*ING/WWC Caribbean Heavyweight Championship
Yukihiro Kanemura	1	1992-12-18	Fukushima, Japan		
Jado	1	1993-09-26	Hachiōji, Japan		
Vacant on 1994-02-11 in Japan after Jado left from W*ING.
WWC Caribbean Heavyweight Championship
Abdullah the Butcher	2	1996-01-06	Caguas, Puerto Rico	Won an 18-man battle royal.	
Inactive on 1997.
Carly Colón	1	2001-09-29	San Germán, Puerto Rico	Defeat Fidel Sierra in a 6-man tournament final.	
Vacant on 2001-12-01 in Caguas, Puerto Rico after Carly Colón won the WWC Universal Heavyweight Championship.
Fidel Sierra	2	2001-12-15	Caguas, Puerto Rico	Defeat El Bronco and Super Gladiador in a 3-way match.	
Konnan	1	2002-01-12	Caguas, Puerto Rico	Also defeat The Barbarian for the AAA Americas Heavyweight Championship on September 8, 2001 in Bayamón, Puerto Rico.	
Fidel Sierra	3	2002-02-09	Orocovis, Puerto Rico		
Super Gladiador (Ricky Frontán)	1	2002-03-09	Caguas, Puerto Rico		
Fidel Sierra	4	2002-04-06	Humacao, Puerto Rico		
Rico Suave	1	2002-05-04	Caguas, Puerto Rico		
Ricky Santana	1	2002-06-01	Cayey, Puerto Rico		
Rico Suave	2	2002-07-06	Cayey, Puerto Rico		
Ricky Santana	2	2002-08-03	Coamo, Puerto Rico		
Inactive on 2002-09-07.
Hideo Saito	1	2010-09-25	Bayamón, Puerto Rico	Won a 10-man battle royal.	
Abbad	1	2010-10-23	Bayamón, Puerto Rico		
Vacant on 2010-11-27 when Abbad no-showed in various matches in Bayamón, Puerto Rico.
Joe Bravo	1	2010-11-27	Bayamón, Puerto Rico	Defeat Chris Joel for the vacant title.	
El Sensacional Carlitos	1	2011-04-02	Quebradillas, Puerto Rico		
Chavo Guerrero Jr.	1	2011-07-16	Bayamón, Puerto Rico	Defeat El Sensacional Carlitos and Orlando Colón in a 3-way match to win the title.	
Orlando Colón	1	2011-09-24	Caguas, Puerto Rico		
El Sensacional Carlitos	2	2011-10-30	Caguas, Puerto Rico		
Bolo the Red Bulldog	1	2012-03-04	Bayamón, Puerto Rico		
El Sensacional Carlitos	3	2012-03-17	Bayamón, Puerto Rico		
Inactive on 2012-03-31 after El Sensacional Carlitos leaves from WWC in Bayamón, Puerto Rico.
Gilbert	1	2023-06-24	Bayamón, Puerto Rico	Defeat Nihan in a 6-man tournament final.	
Xavant	1	2023-07-29	Moca, Puerto Rico	Defeat Gilbert in TLC match for the WWC Caribbean and WWC Puerto Rico Heavyweight Championship on August 31, 2024.	
Nihan	1	2024-09-28	Aibonito, Puerto Rico		
Mr. Big	1	2024-12-14	Bayamón, Puerto Rico		
Zcion Rt1	1	2025-03-01	Bayamón, Puerto Rico		
Nick Mercer	1	2025-08-30	Bayamón, Puerto Rico		
Lightning	1	2025-11-15	Santa Isabel, Puerto Rico		
Tony Leyenda	1	2026-01-24	Bayamón, Puerto Rico	Defeat Lightning and El Hijo de dos caras in 3-way match.	
John Hawking	1	2026-03-14	Bayamón, Puerto Rico	Defeat Tony Leyenda in a double title match for the WWC Caribbean Heavyweight and WWC Pr. Heavyweight Championship.	
Intelecto 5 Estrellas	1	2026-08-29	Bayamón, Puerto Rico		
