= Hans Mortier =

Dutch professional wrestler (1924–2010)

Personal information
- Born: Jacob Grobbe; January 28, 1924 Leiden, South Holland, Netherlands
- Died: December 15, 2010 (aged 85)

Professional wrestling career
- Ring name(s): Hans Mortier; Dutch Howlett; Lord Charles Monteque; Lord Charles Montague; Great Zorro; Tarzan Zorro; Dr. Death
- Billed height: 6 ft 5 in (196 cm)
- Billed weight: 275 lb (125 kg)
- Billed from: Nuremberg, Germany
- Debut: 1946
- Retired: 1973

Jacob "Jaap" Grobbe (January 28, 1924 – December 15, 2010), better known as Hans Mortier, was a Dutch professional wrestler best known for his stint in the World Wide Wrestling Federation (WWWF) and his feud with WWWF Champion Bruno Sammartino in the 1960s.

Hans Mortier was a world-class bodybuilder before he entered the ring and was known by many as "The Great".

== Professional wrestling career ==
Before becoming a professional wrestler, Grobbe worked as a professional body builder. His first wrestling match was in Tacoma in 1946 against Abe Yourist. He later wrestled out of Columbus, Ohio, in the late 1940s and early 1950s using under the ring name Dutch Howlett. Grobbe went around the world fighting in New Zealand, Australia as the Great Zorro, South Africa, and France. He at one time held the European Championship. By the early 1960s, Grobbe returned to the United States.

In 1963, Grobbe signed a contract with the World Wide Wrestling Federation where he was managed by Wild Red Berry. He feuded with Bruno Sammartino for Samamrtino's WWWF Championship. The feud would go through areas like Boston Gardens, Madison Square Garden, and The Philadelphia Arena. In 1964 he also teamed up with his storyline brother Max Mortier, played first by Gil Voiney and later by Jack Berry. Their feud included a Texas Death match in Philadelphia.

In summer 1963, after the Sammartino matches, he lost a Madison Square Garden match in less than a minute to former champion Buddy Rogers. Rogers stunned Mortier with a dropkick from behind, before the bell, and clamped on the figure-4 legvine for the submission. He upset Bobo Brazil in less than a minute in Madison Square Garden with "the guillotene" (full nelson) submission.

Mortier returned to the WWWF in 1967 and again faced Sammartino for the title, ultimately losing. Mortier had excellent matches against Edouard Carpentier—often a "draw"—being pinned by Carpentier in Madison Square Garden on his second and final exit from the WWWF in 1968.

In 1970, he was known as Lord Charles Montague in NWA Big Time Wrestling in Texas. He would finish his career in the 1970s.

== Personal life ==
After World War II, Grobbe went overseas to the United States to be stationed at a United States Military base. There he learned several languages, including English, French, German, Dutch, and Afrikaans. He also became a police officer for six months in Tacoma, Washington.

Mortier died on December 15, 2010, in the Netherlands due to natural causes, he was 85.

In 2015 Hans Mortier was posthumously inducted into the Dutch Wrestling Hall Of Fame. The award was accepted by his daughter.

== Championships and accomplishments ==
- 50th State Big Time Wrestling
  - NWA Hawaii Tag Team Championship (1 time) - with Johnny Barend
- Dutch Pro Wrestling
  - Dutch Wrestling Hall of Fame (Class of 2015)
- L&G Promotions
  - L&G Caribbean Heavyweight Championship (1 time)
- International Wrestling Association (Montreal)
  - IWA International Heavyweight Championship (1 time)
- NWA Florida
  - NWA Florida Heavyweight Championship (2 times)
- NWA Hollywood Wrestling
  - NWA Americas Tag Team Championship (1 time) - with Mr. Wrestling
