= Showdown at Shea =

American professional wrestling event

Showdown at Shea was the name given to three professional wrestling events presented by the World Wide Wrestling Federation (WWWF), and then World Wrestling Federation (WWF), at Flushing, New York's Shea Stadium. The events were held in 1972, 1976, and 1980.

== Event results ==
=== 1972 ===
Showdown At Shea (1972)
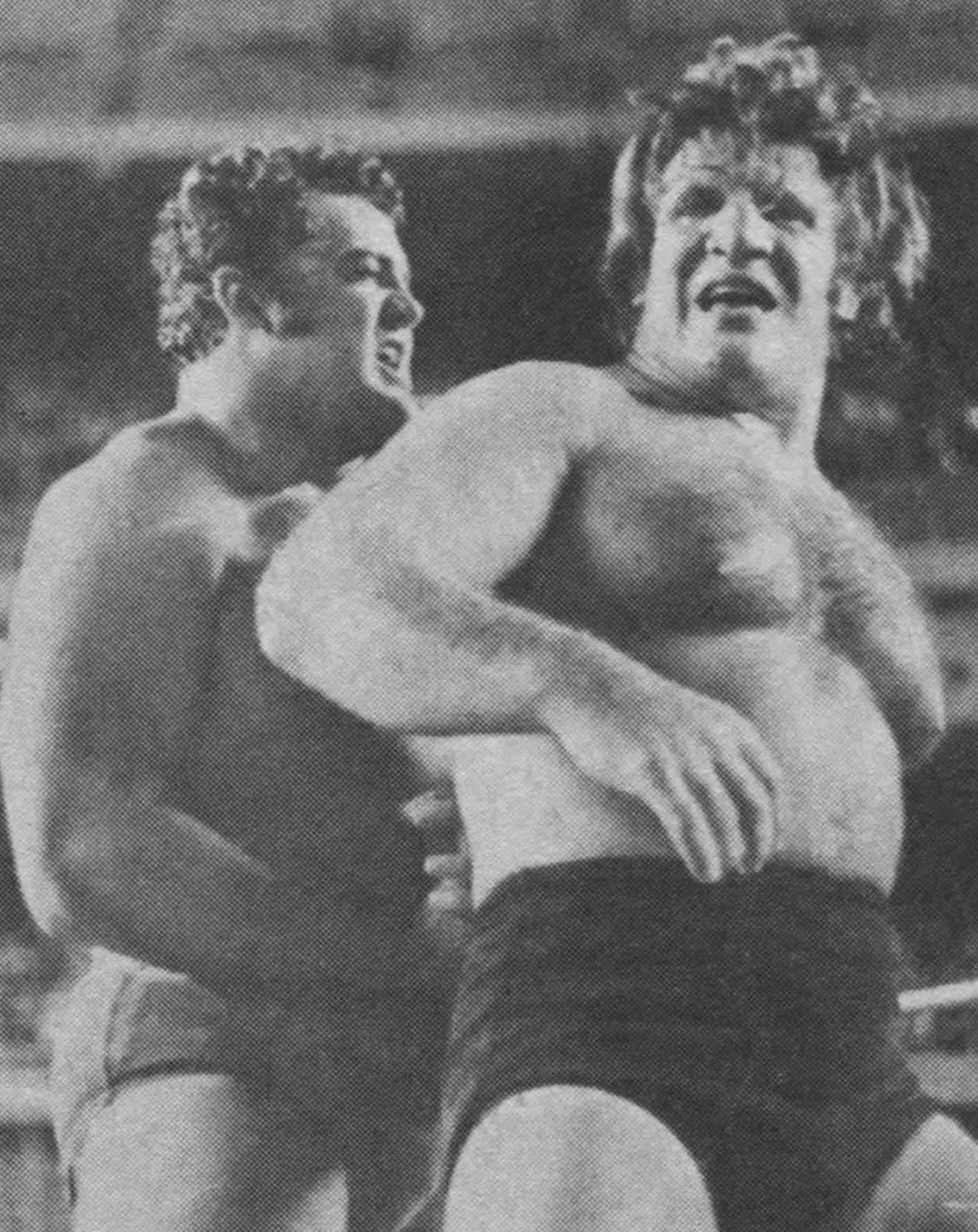
- Pedro Morales wrestling Bruno Sammartino in the main event
- Promotion: World Wide Wrestling Federation
- Date: September 30, 1972
- City: Flushing, New York
- Venue: Shea Stadium
- Attendance: 22,508

Showdown at Shea chronology
← Previous; First	Next → 1976

No.	Results	Stipulations	Times
1	Little Beaver and Little Louie defeated Pee Wee Adams and Sonny Boy Hayes	Tag team match	08:25
2	El Olimpico defeated Chuck O'Connor by disqualification	Singles match	05:15
3	Jack Brisco defeated Mr. Fuji	Singles match	14:07
4	Gorilla Monsoon defeated Ernie Ladd via referee's decision after they fought to a time-limit draw	Singles match	20:00
5	Chief Jay Strongbow and Sonny King defeated Lou Albano and The Spoiler	Tag team match	04:28
6	The Fabulous Moolah (c) defeated Debbie Johnson	Singles match for the NWA World Women's Championship	07:27
7	Pedro Morales (c) vs. Bruno Sammartino ended in a curfew draw	Singles match for the WWWF Heavyweight Championship	75:05
(c) / – the champion(s) heading into the match

- During the main event George Steele came to ringside

=== 1976 ===
This event featured the telecast of Muhammad Ali vs. Antonio Inoki fight from Tokyo, Japan.

Showdown at Shea (1976)
- Promotion: World Wide Wrestling Federation
- Date: June 25, 1976
- City: Flushing, New York
- Venue: Shea Stadium
- Attendance: 32,000

Showdown at Shea chronology
← Previous; 1972	Next → 1980

No.	Results	Stipulations	Times
1	Ivan Putski defeated Baron Mikel Scicluna	Singles match	07:58
2	José Gonzáles vs. Kevin Sullivan ended in a time-limit draw	Singles match	20:00
3	Chief Jay Strongbow and Billy White Wolf (c) defeated The Executioners (#1 and #2)	Tag Team Two-out-of-three-falls match for the WWWF World Tag Team Championship	19:58
4	André the Giant defeated Chuck Wepner by countout	Singles match	07:15
5	Bruno Sammartino (c) defeated Stan Hansen	Singles match for the WWWF Heavyweight Championship	10:19
6	Muhammad Ali vs. Antonio Inoki ended in a 15 round draw	Boxer vs. Wrestler match (Note: The match was shown to the audience live after the conclusion of Sammartino-Hansen, as it was happening in real-time simultaneously via closed-circuit, with the match taking place in Tokyo, Japan.)	45:00 (Note: Every round was 3 minutes in length.)
(c) / – the champion(s) heading into the match

=== 1980 ===
Showdown at Shea (1980)
- Promotion: World Wrestling Federation
- Date: August 9, 1980
- City: Flushing, New York
- Venue: Shea Stadium
- Attendance: 36,295

Event chronology
← Previous; Showdown at Shea	Next → Brawl to End it All

Showdown at Shea chronology
← Previous; 1976	Next → Last

In January 2019 the match between Antonio Inoki and Larry Sharpe was uploaded to the WWE Network.

No.	Results	Stipulations	Times
1	Angel Maravilla defeated José Estrada	Singles match	07:26
2	Dominic DeNucci defeated Baron Mikel Scicluna	Singles match	05:56
3	Tatsumi Fujinami (c) defeated Chavo Guerrero	Singles match for the WWF Junior Heavyweight Championship	10:28
4	Antonio Inoki (c) defeated Larry Sharpe	Singles match for the WWF World Martial Arts Heavyweight Championship	08:52
5	Bob Backlund and Pedro Morales defeated the Wild Samoans (Afa and Sika) (c) 2-0	Tag Team Two-out-of-three falls match for the WWF World Tag Team Championship	13:06
6	Pat Patterson defeated Tor Kamata by disqualification	Singles match	02:09
7	The Fabulous Moolah and Beverly Shade defeated Kandi Malloy and Peggy Lee	Tag team match	06:03
8	Greg Gagne defeated Rick McGraw	Singles match	14:33
9	Tony Atlas defeated Ken Patera (c) by countout	Singles match for the WWF Intercontinental Championship	08:13
10	Ivan Putski defeated Johnny Rodz	Singles match	04:47
11	The Hangman defeated Rene Goulet	Singles match	08:28
12	André the Giant defeated Hulk Hogan	Singles match	07:48
13	Bruno Sammartino defeated Larry Zbyszko	Steel Cage match	13:59
(c) / – the champion(s) heading into the match

== See also ==
- History of WWE
