= BJ (wrestler) =

Puerto Rican professional wrestler

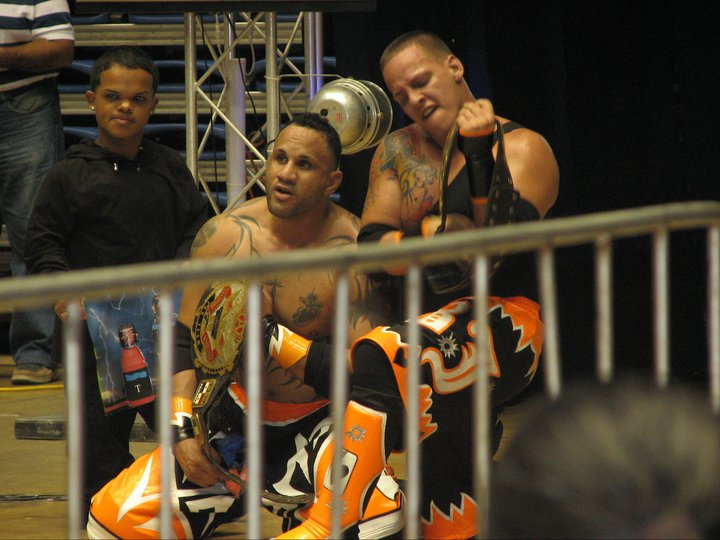
- BJ (right) as WWC World Tag Team Champion.

Personal information
- Born: San Juan, Puerto Rico

Professional wrestling career
- Ring name(s): El Fenomeno BJ; El Nuevo Fenómeno Gangue
- Billed height: 5 ft 11 in (1.80 m)
- Billed weight: 220 lb (100 kg)
- Debut: 2006

Ángel Rosado García is a professional wrestler from Puerto Rico better known by his ring name BJ.

== Championships and accomplishments ==
- World Wrestling Council
  - WWC Universal Heavyweight Championship (3 times)
  - WWC Puerto Rico Championship (3 times)
  - WWC Television Championship (2 times)
  - WWC World Tag Team Championship (3 times) – with Chicano (2) and Joe Bravo (1)
  - WWC World Junior Heavyweight Championship (2 times)
- World Wrestling League
  - WWL World Heavyweight Championship (1 time)
  - WWL Americas Championship (1 time)
