= List of WWC Universal Heavyweight Champions =

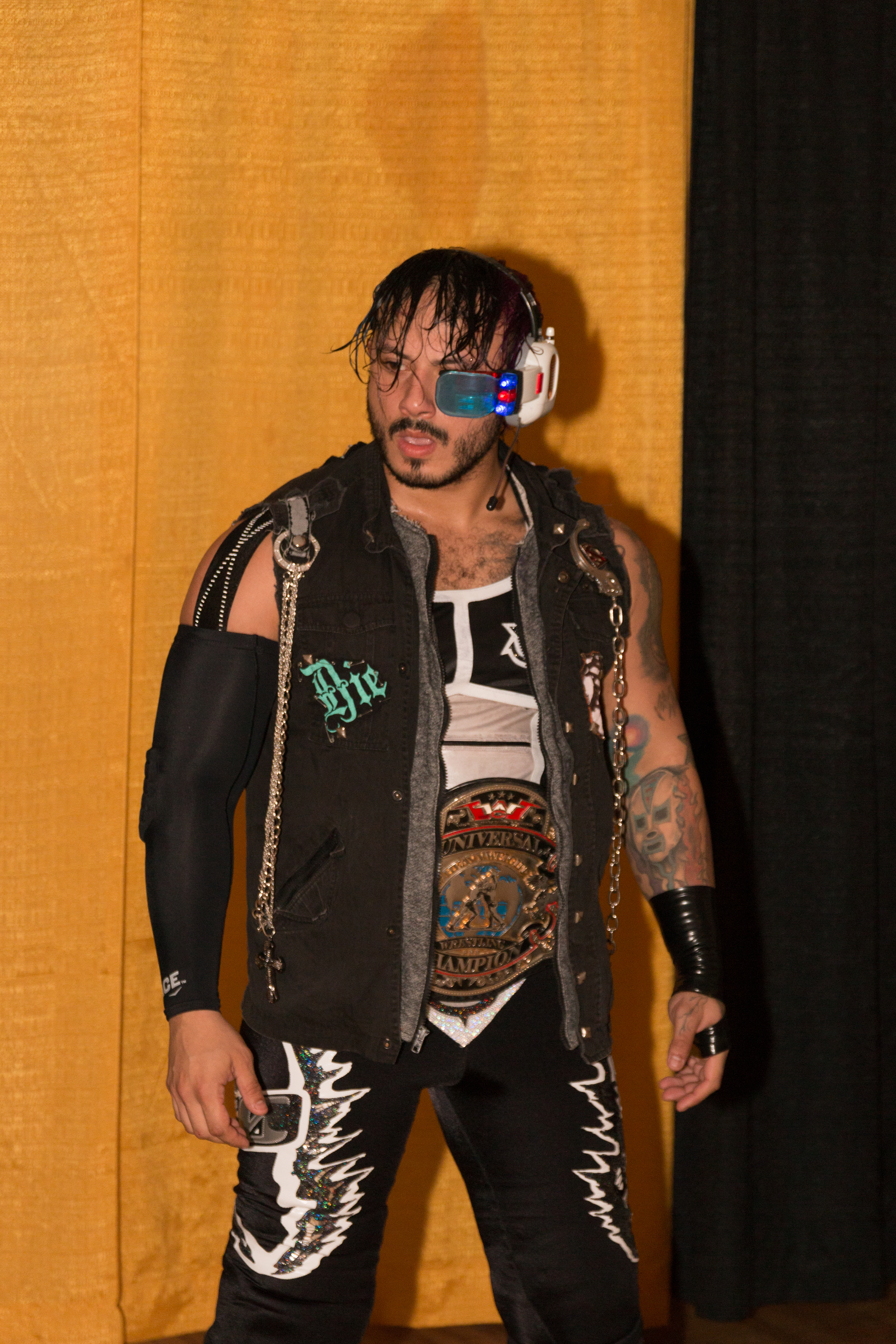
Mr. 450 as the WWC Universal Heavyweight Champion.

The WWC Universal Heavyweight Championship is a professional wrestling championship owned by the World Wrestling Council (WWC) promotion. Locally, it is exclusively defended in WWC, but has made several appearances in foreign promotions during international tours. Being a professional wrestling championship, it is won via a scripted ending to a match or awarded to a wrestler because of a storyline. All but two of the title changes have occurred at WWC-promoted events, with the exceptions taking place at events hosted by International Championship Wrestling (ICW) and the International Wrestling Association (IWA). Title changes that occur on WWC's television program Súperestrellas de la Lucha Libre usually air on tape delay and as such are listed with the day the tapings occurred, rather than the air date.

The title was introduced as a plot device to promote the return of Abdullah the Butcher on July 21, 1982, and was originally named the "Capitol Sports Promotions (CSP) World Heavyweight Championship". Within a year, the title was renamed "CSP Universal Heavyweight Championship" following a storyline where titlist Carlos Colón defeated NWA World Heavyweight Champion Ric Flair in a match to determine which title had supremacy. When CSP reorganized and adopted the name of WWC, the championship's acronym was changed along it. It has remained under this name ever since, but due to copyright concerns it was briefly renamed "Capitol Heavyweight Championship" when the IWA gained possession of the belt on January 6, 2008.

The inaugural champion was Abdullah the Butcher. Carlos Colón, Sr. has held the title the most, with 26 reigns. The longest reign in the title history is Colón, Sr.'s second reign at 655 days. Carly Colón's 11th and the only reigns of Vampiro and Lance Hoyt are tied for the record of shortest reign in the title's history, lasting less than one day. Carlos Colón holds the record for combined days as champion, with 3,945. Overall, there have been 147 reigns shared among 49 wrestlers, not including one expunged reign and one unofficial title change, with 35 vacancies totaling 1,010 Days.

== Title history ==
Names
Names	Dates	Ref(s).
CSP World Heavyweight Championship	June 20, 1982 – July 24, 1982	
WWC World Heavyweight Championship	July 24, 1982 – December 18, 1983	
WWC Universal Heavyweight Championship	December 18, 1983 – present	
Capitol Heavyweight Championship (unofficial)	January 6, 2008 – January 10, 2008	

=== Reigns ===
Key
No.	Overall reign number
Reign	Reign number for the specific champion
Days	Number of days held
†	Championship change is unrecognized by the promotion
<1	Reign lasted less than a day
+	Current reign is changing daily

No.	Champion	Championship change			Reign statistics		Notes	Ref.
No.	Champion	Date	Event	Location	Reign	Days	Notes	Ref.
1	Abdullah the Butcher	June 20, 1982	N/A	Okinawa, Japan	1	34	Abdullah was billed as the CSP World Heavyweight Champion upon arrival and later billed as having defeated Antonio Inoki on June 20 in Okinawa, Japan to win the title.	
2	Carlos Colón	July 24, 1982	Superestrellas de la Lucha Libre	San Juan, Puerto Rico	1	273	The title is renamed the WWC World Heavyweight Championship during this reignt.	
3	Ox Baker	April 23, 1983	Superestrellas de la Lucha Libre	San Juan, Puerto Rico	1	21		
4	Carlos Colón	May 14, 1983	Superestrellas de la Lucha Libre	San Juan, Puerto Rico	2	655	Title renamed WWC Universal Heavyweight Championship on December 18, 1983 in Bayamon, Puerto Rico after Colón defeats NWA World Heavyweight champion Ric Flair in a cage match. This is the longest reign in Championship history.	
5	Dory Funk, Jr.	February 27, 1985	Superestrellas de la Lucha Libre	Bangor, Maine	1	80	At an International Championship Wrestling event.	
—	Vacated	May 18, 1985	Superestrellas de la Lucha Libre	Bayamón, Puerto Rico	—	—	Held up after a match between Carlos Colón and Dory Funk, Jr.	
6	Carlos Colón	June 15, 1985	Superestrellas de la Lucha Libre	San Juan, Puerto Rico	3	98	Defeat Dory Funk, Jr. in rematch.	
—	Vacated	September 21, 1985	WWC Aniversario 1985	San Juan, Puerto Rico	—	—	Held up after a match between Carlos Colón and Abdullah the Butcher.	
7	Carlos Colón	October 19, 1985	Superestrellas de la Lucha Libre	Bayamón, Puerto Rico	4	193	Defeat Abdullah the Butcher in rematch.	
—	Vacated	April 30, 1986	Superestrellas de la Lucha Libre	—	—	—	The title was vacated when Colón was injured.	
8	Carlos Colón	September 21, 1986	WWC Aniversario 1986	San Juan, Puerto Rico	5	300	Defeat Terry Funk in a tournament final.	
9	Hercules Ayala	July 18, 1987	Superestrellas de la Lucha Libre	San Juan, Puerto Rico	1	64		
10	Carlos Colón	September 20, 1987	WWC Aniversario 1987	Ponce, Puerto Rico	6	146		
11	Hercules Ayala	February 13, 1988	Superestrellas de la Lucha Libre	San Juan, Puerto Rico	2	56		
12	Carlos Colón	April 9, 1988	Superestrellas de la Lucha Libre	Caguas, Puerto Rico	7	105		
13	Hercules Ayala	July 23, 1988	Superestrellas de la Lucha Libre	Arecibo, Puerto Rico	3	32		
—	Vacated	August 24, 1988	Superestrellas de la Lucha Libre	—	—	—	Ayala was stripped of the title after attacking Carlos Colón's wife during a banquet.	
14	Ron Garvin	November 24, 1988	Superestrellas de la Lucha Libre	Carolina, Puerto Rico	1	18	Defeated Carlos Colón in a tournament final.	
15	Carlos Colón	December 12, 1988	Superestrellas de la Lucha Libre	San Juan, Puerto Rico	8	166		
16	Steve Strong	May 27, 1989	Superestrellas de la Lucha Libre	Caguas, Puerto Rico	1	133		
17	Carlos Colón	October 7, 1989	Superestrellas de la Lucha Libre	Bayamón, Puerto Rico	9	21		
—	Vacated	October 28, 1989	Superestrellas de la Lucha Libre	—	—	—	Held up after a match between Carlos Colón and Steve Strong.	
18	Carlos Colón	November 23, 1989	Superestrellas de la Lucha Libre	Bayamón, Puerto Rico	10	24	Defeat Strong in a rematch.	
19	Leo Burke	December 17, 1989	Superestrellas de la Lucha Libre	Mayagüez, Puerto Rico	1	54		
20	TNT	February 9, 1990	Superestrellas de la Lucha Libre	Caguas, Puerto Rico	1	43		
21	Abdullah the Butcher	March 24, 1990	Superestrellas de la Lucha Libre	San Juan, Puerto Rico	2	7		
22	Carlos Colón	March 31, 1990	Superestrellas de la Lucha Libre	San Juan, Puerto Rico	11	259		
—	Vacated	December 15, 1990	Superestrellas de la Lucha Libre	Bayamón, Puerto Rico	—	—	Held up after a match between Carlos Colón and Greg Valentine.	
23	Carlos Colón	February 2, 1991	Superestrellas de la Lucha Libre	Bayamón, Puerto Rico	12	245	Defeat Valentine in a rematch.	
—	Vacated	October 5, 1991	Superestrellas de la Lucha Libre	Carolina, Puerto Rico	—	—	Held up after a match between Carlos Colón and Dino Bravo.	
24	Carlos Colón	November 2, 1991	Superestrellas de la Lucha Libre	Carolina, Puerto Rico	13	91	Defeat Bravo in rematch.	
25	Ron Garvin	February 1, 1992	Superestrellas de la Lucha Libre	Caguas, Puerto Rico	2	63		
26	Carlos Colón	April 4, 1992	Superestrellas de la Lucha Libre	Caguas, Puerto Rico	14	126		
27	Invader I	August 8, 1992	WWC Aniversario 1992	Bayamón, Puerto Rico	1	42		
28	Abdullah the Butcher	September 19, 1992	Superestrellas de la Lucha Libre	Carolina, Puerto Rico	3	7		
29	Invader I	September 26, 1992	Superestrellas de la Lucha Libre	—	2	14	Awarded the title when decision of the September 19 match is overturned because of outside interference by Dick Murdoch.	
—	Vacated	October 10, 1992	Superestrellas de la Lucha Libre	Ponce, Puerto Rico	—	—	Held up after a match between Invader I and Dick Murdoch.	
30	Dick Murdoch	October 25, 1992	Superestrellas de la Lucha Libre	Bayamón, Puerto Rico	1	34	Defeat the Invader I in rematch.	
31	Carlos Colón	November 28, 1992	Superestrellas de la Lucha Libre	Manatí, Puerto Rico	15	175		
—	Vacated	May 22, 1993	Superestrellas de la Lucha Libre	—	—	—	Colón entered a temporary retirement.	
32	Greg Valentine	August 7, 1993	Superestrellas de la Lucha Libre	Ponce, Puerto Rico	1	238	Defeat Invader I in a 8-man tournament final.	
33	Ray González	April 2, 1994	Superestrellas de la Lucha Libre	Caguas, Puerto Rico	1	78		
34	Dutch Mantell	June 19, 1994	Superestrellas de la Lucha Libre	Toa Alta, Puerto Rico	1	49		
35	Carlos Colón	August 7, 1994	Superestrellas de la Lucha Libre	Ponce, Puerto Rico	16	495	Defeat Dutch Mantel in a Texas death double title match for the WWC World Television and WWC Universal Heavyweight titles.	
—	Vacated	December 15, 1995	Superestrellas de la Lucha Libre	—	—	—	Held up after a match between Carlos Colón and Mabel.	
36	Carlos Colón	January 6, 1996	Superestrellas de la Lucha Libre	Caguas, Puerto Rico	17	6	Defeat Mabel in rematch.	
37	Mabel	January 12, 1996	Superestrellas de la Lucha Libre	San Germán, Puerto Rico	1	29		
38	Abdullah the Butcher	February 10, 1996	Superestrellas de la Lucha Libre	Caguas, Puerto Rico	4	42		
39	El Bronco	March 23, 1996	Superestrellas de la Lucha Libre	Caguas, Puerto Rico	1	28		
40	Carlos Colón	April 20, 1996	Superestrellas de la Lucha Libre	Caguas, Puerto Rico	18	35		
—	Vacated	May 25, 1996	Superestrellas de la Lucha Libre	Caguas, Puerto Rico	—	—	Held up after a match between Carlos Colón and Mr. Hughes.	
41	Carlos Colón	June 15, 1996	Superestrellas de la Lucha Libre	Caguas, Puerto Rico	19	157	Defeat Hughes in rematch.	
42	Huracán Castillo	October 19, 1996	Superestrellas de la Lucha Libre	Humacao, Puerto Rico	1	7		
43	Carlos Colón	October 26, 1996	Superestrellas de la Lucha Libre	—	20	119		
44	El Nene	February 22, 1997	Superestrellas de la Lucha Libre	Ponce, Puerto Rico	1	14		
45	Carlos Colón	March 8, 1997	Superestrellas de la Lucha Libre	Humacao, Puerto Rico	21	14		
—	Vacated	March 22, 1997	Superestrellas de la Lucha Libre	Yabucoa, Puerto Rico	—	—	Held up after a match between Carlos Colón and Jim Steele.	
46	Carlos Colón	April 5, 1997	Superestrellas de la Lucha Libre	Caguas, Puerto Rico	22	36		
—	Vacated	May 11, 1997	Superestrellas de la Lucha Libre	Cabo Rojo, Puerto Rico	—	—		
47	Ray González	August 13, 1997	Superestrellas de la Lucha Libre	Humacao, Puerto Rico	2	172	Defeat Tom Brandi in a tournament final.	
—	Vacated	February 1, 1998	Superestrellas de la Lucha Libre	Manatí, Puerto Rico	—	—	Held up after a match between Ray González and Fidel Sierra.	
48	Ray González	February 14, 1998	Superestrellas de la Lucha Libre	Caguas, Puerto Rico	3	43	Defeat Sierra in rematch.	
49	El Nene	March 29, 1998	Superestrellas de la Lucha Libre	Gurabo, Puerto Rico	2	41		
—	Vacated	May 9, 1998	Superestrellas de la Lucha Libre	Bayamón, Puerto Rico	—	—	El Nene was stripped of the title for using a foreign object.	
50	Ray González	May 16, 1998	Superestrellas de la Lucha Libre	Bayamón, Puerto Rico	4	77	Won the rematch against El Nene.	
51	Carlos Colón	August 1, 1998	WWC Aniversario 1998	San Juan, Puerto Rico	23	1		
52	Ray González	August 2, 1998	Superestrellas de la Lucha Libre	Mayagüez, Puerto Rico	5	116		
53	Glamour Boy Shane	November 28, 1998	Superestrellas de la Lucha Libre	Bayamón, Puerto Rico	1	28		
54	Ray González	December 26, 1998	Superestrellas de la Lucha Libre	Guaynabo, Puerto Rico	6	28		
55	Carlos Colón	January 23, 1999	Superestrellas de la Lucha Libre	Caguas, Puerto Rico	24	35		
—	Vacated	February 27, 1999	Superestrellas de la Lucha Libre	San Juan, Puerto Rico	—	—	Colón was stripped of the title for using an illegal object against the referee and Ray Gonzalez.	
56	Ray González	March 6, 1999	Superestrellas de la Lucha Libre	San Juan, Puerto Rico	7	21	Awarded.	
—	Vacated	March 27, 1999	Superestrellas de la Lucha Libre	Guaynabo, Puerto Rico	—	—	Held up after a match between Ray González and Pierroth, Jr.	
57	Ray González	April 3, 1999	Superestrellas de la Lucha Libre	Guaynabo, Puerto Rico	8	35	Defeat Pierroth Jr. in rematch.	
58	Pierroth, Jr.	May 8, 1999	Superestrellas de la Lucha Libre	San Germán, Puerto Rico	1	28		
59	Ray González	June 5, 1999	Superestrellas de la Lucha Libre	Guaynabo, Puerto Rico	9	70		
60	Carlos Colón	August 14, 1999	WWC Aniversario 1999	Caguas, Puerto Rico	25	91		
—	Vacated	November 13, 1999	Superestrellas de la Lucha Libre	Naguabo, Puerto Rico	—	—	Held up after a match between Carlos Colón and Ray González.	
61	Carlos Colón	November 27, 1999	Superestrellas de la Lucha Libre	Guaynabo, Puerto Rico	26	42		
62	Ray González	January 8, 2000	Superestrellas de la Lucha Libre	Fajardo, Puerto Rico	10	21		
63	Carly Colón	January 29, 2000	Superestrellas de la Lucha Libre	Carolina, Puerto Rico	1	21		
64	Ray González	February 19, 2000	Superestrellas de la Lucha Libre	Carolina, Puerto Rico	11	148		
65	Carly Colón	July 16, 2000	WWC Aniversario 2000	Caguas, Puerto Rico	2	76		
66	Curt Hennig	September 30, 2000	Superestrellas de la Lucha Libre	Caguas, Puerto Rico	1	7		
—	Vacated	October 7, 2000	Superestrellas de la Lucha Libre	—	—	—	Held up after a time limit draw between Curt Hennig and Carly Colón.	
67	Carly Colón	November 25, 2000	Superestrellas de la Lucha Libre	Carolina, Puerto Rico	3	84	Defeat Hennig in a rematch.	
68	Jerry Flynn	February 17, 2001	Superestrellas de la Lucha Libre	Manatí, Puerto Rico	1	14		
69	El Bronco	March 3, 2001	Superestrellas de la Lucha Libre	Carolina, Puerto Rico	2	28		
70	Ray González	March 31, 2001	Superestrellas de la Lucha Libre	Carolina, Puerto Rico	12	77		
—	Vacated	June 16, 2001	Superestrellas de la Lucha Libre	Carolina, Puerto Rico	—	—	Held up after a match between Ray González and Super Gladiador (Ricky Frontán).	
71	Ray González	July 7, 2001	Superestrellas de la Lucha Libre	Carolina, Puerto Rico	13	147	Defeat Super Gladiador in a rematch.	
72	Carly Colón	December 1, 2001	Superestrellas de la Lucha Libre	Caguas, Puerto Rico	4	126		
—	Vacated	April 6, 2002	Superestrellas de la Lucha Libre	Humacao, Puerto Rico	—	—	Carly Colón surrendered the title to Vampiro, following a controversial match between the two.	
73	Vampiro	April 13, 2002	Superestrellas de la Lucha Libre	Caguas, Puerto Rico	1	7		
—	Vacated	April 20, 2002	Superestrellas de la Lucha Libre	—	—	—	Held up by official decision.	
74	Carly Colón	April 27, 2002	Superestrellas de la Lucha Libre	Fajardo, Puerto Rico	5	189	Defeat Vampiro in rematch.	
75	Konnan	November 2, 2002	Superestrellas de la Lucha Libre	San Sebastián, Puerto Rico	1	21		
76	Carly Colón	November 23, 2002	Superestrellas de la Lucha Libre	Las Piedras, Puerto Rico	6	56		
77	Chicky Starr	January 18, 2003	Superestrellas de la Lucha Libre	San Lorenzo, Puerto Rico	1	14		
78	Carly Colón	February 1, 2003	Superestrellas de la Lucha Libre	Humacao, Puerto Rico	7	42		
79	Sabu	March 15, 2003	Superestrellas de la Lucha Libre	Carolina, Puerto Rico	1	77		
80	Carly Colón	May 31, 2003	Superestrellas de la Lucha Libre	Carolina, Puerto Rico	8	7		
—	Vacated	June 7, 2003	Superestrellas de la Lucha Libre	Cayey, Puerto Rico	—	—	Held up after a match between Carly Colón and El Bronco.	
81	Carly Colón	June 14, 2003	Superestrellas de la Lucha Libre	Cataño, Puerto Rico	9	13	Defeat El Bronco in rematch.	
—	Vacated	June 27, 2003	Superestrellas de la Lucha Libre	—	—	—	Vacated when Carly Colón signed a developmental contract with World Wrestling Entertainment.	
82	Lightning	July 18, 2003	Superestrellas de la Lucha Libre	Guayama, Puerto Rico	1	29	Defeat Eddie Colón in a tournament final.	
83	Ricky Cruz	August 16, 2003	Superestrellas de la Lucha Libre	Guayanilla, Puerto Rico	1	28		
84	El Diamante	September 13, 2003	Superestrellas de la Lucha Libre	Yabucoa, Puerto Rico	1	98		
85	Carly Colón	December 20, 2003	Superestrellas de la Lucha Libre	Caguas, Puerto Rico	10	14		
86	Abdullah the Butcher	January 3, 2004	Superestrellas de la Lucha Libre	Bayamón, Puerto Rico	5	252		
—	Vacated	September 11, 2004	Superestrellas de la Lucha Libre	—	—	—		
87	El Bronco	September 25, 2004	Superestrellas de la Lucha Libre	Carolina, Puerto Rico	3	42	Defeat Huracán Castillo, Jr. in a tournament final.	
88	Eddie Colón	November 6, 2004	Superestrellas de la Lucha Libre	Guaynabo, Puerto Rico	1	35		
—	Vacated	December 11, 2004	Superestrellas de la Lucha Libre	Caguas, Puerto Rico	—	—	Held up after a match between Eddie Colón and Titus.	
90	Eddie Colón	January 6, 2005	Crossfire 2004	Caguas, Puerto Rico	2	142	Defeat Titus in rematch.	
91	El Diamante	May 28, 2005	Superestrellas de la Lucha Libre	Gurabo, Puerto Rico	2	49		
92	Eddie Colón	July 16, 2005	Superestrellas de la Lucha Libre	Bayamón, Puerto Rico	3	55		
—	Vacated	September 9, 2005	Superestrellas de la Lucha Libre	Manatí, Puerto Rico	—	—	Held up after match between Eddie Colón and La Amenaza Bryan.	
93	La Amenaza Bryan	September 11, 2005	Superestrellas de la Lucha Libre	Sabana Grande, Puerto Rico	1	56	Defeat Eddie Colón in rematch.	
94	Glamour Boy Shane	November 6, 2005	Superestrellas de la Lucha Libre	Mayagüez, Puerto Rico	2	90		
95	La Amenaza Bryan	February 4, 2006	Superestrellas de la Lucha Libre	Bayamón, Puerto Rico	2	49		
96	Lance Hoyt	March 25, 2006	Superestrellas de la Lucha Libre	Carolina, Puerto Rico	1	<1		
97	Black Pain	March 25, 2006	Superestrellas de la Lucha Libre	Carolina, Puerto Rico	1	140		
98	La Amenaza Bryan	August 12, 2006	Aniversario 2006	Bayamón, Puerto Rico	3	39		
—	Vacated	September 20, 2006	Superestrellas de la Lucha Libre	—	—	—	Amenaza Bryan was stripped of the title after leaving the company due to payment and creative differences.	
99	Abbad	September 30, 2006	Superestrellas de la Lucha Libre	Bayamón, Puerto Rico	1	28	Won a tournament final to determine the new champion.	
100	Jon Heidenreich	October 28, 2006	Superestrellas de la Lucha Libre	Bayamón, Puerto Rico	1	49		
101	José Rivera, Jr.	November 30, 2006	Superestrellas de la Lucha Libre	Bayamón, Puerto Rico	1	28		
102	Carlito Caribbean Cool	December 16, 2006	Lockout 2006	Bayamón, Puerto Rico	11	<1	Had previously won the championship as Carly Colón	
—	Vacated	December 16, 2006	Superestrellas de la Lucha Libre	—	—	—	Carlito Caribbean Cool was stripped by Victor Jovica.	
103	Jon Heidenreich	December 16, 2006	Lockout 2006	Bayamón, Puerto Rico	2	21	Awarded.	
104	Eddie Colón	January 6, 2007	Euphoria 2007	Bayamón, Puerto Rico	4	70		
105	Alofa The Samoan Tank	March 17, 2007	Honor vs Traición 2007	Bayamón, Puerto Rico	1	56		
106	Apolo	May 12, 2007	Summer Madness 2007	Bayamón, Puerto Rico	1	7		
107	Eddie Colón	May 19, 2007	Superestrellas de la Lucha Libre	Manatí, Puerto Rico	5	22	Colón participated in a Battle Royal where Apolo defended the championship.	
108	Apolo	June 10, 2007	Superestrellas de la Lucha Libre	Yauco, Puerto Rico	2	24		
†	Brent Dail	July 4, 2007	Superestrellas de la Lucha Libre	Boston, Massachusetts, United States	—	—		
†	Apolo	July 5, 2007	Superestrellas	Yauco, Puerto Rico	3	10		
109	Razor Ramon	July 14, 2007	Aniversario 2007	Mayagüez, Puerto Rico	1	154	Won a three-way match that included Carlito and Apolo.	
†	Biggie Size	December 15, 2007	Lockout 2007	Caguas, Puerto Rico	1	14	Won the title by forfeit when Razor Ramon failed to appear and Biggie Size pinned Jack Meléndez. Despite being originally regarded as an official reign, WWC withdrew its recognition afterwards.	
—	Vacated	December 29, 2007	Superestrellas de la Lucha Libre	—	—	—	The WWC announced during their television program, that they had declared the championship vacant and would not be recognizing Biggie Size's reign.	
†	Blitz	January 6, 2008	IWA Histeria Boricua 2008	Bayamón, Puerto Rico	1	4	Defeated Biggie Size in a unification match and became the first Undisputed IWA World Heavyweight Champion. Title change is recognized by the IWA and NWA but not the WWC.	
110	Noriega	July 19, 2008	Aniversario 2008	San Juan, Puerto Rico	1	37	Defeat Orlando Colón in a tournament final.	
—	Vacated	August 25, 2008	Superestrellas de la Lucha Libre	—	—	—	Vacated when Noriega leaves the company.	
111	Ray González	September 21, 2008	Superestrellas de la Lucha Libre	Bayamón, Puerto Rico	14	140	Defeat Shane to win the vacant title.	
112	Steve Corino	February 8, 2009	Superestrellas de la Lucha Libre	Naguabo, Puerto Rico	1	62		
113	BJ	April 11, 2009	Superestrellas de la Lucha Libre	Bayamón, Puerto Rico	1	<1	Mr. Mac was the official referee of this match.	
—	Vacated	April 11, 2009	Superestrellas de la Lucha Libre	—	—	—	Stripped of the title after the other referee interface to do a countdown between the match of Steve Corino and BJ. because he was not the official referee.	
114	Steve Corino	April 11, 2009	Superestrellas de la Lucha Libre	Bayamón, Puerto Rico	2	91	Title returned by the official referee Mr. Mac.	
115	BJ	July 11, 2009	Aniversario 2009	Bayamón, Puerto Rico	2	35		
—	Vacated	August 15, 2009	Summer Madness 2009	Bayamón, Puerto Rico	—	—		
116	Noriega	September 26, 2009	Septiembre Negro 2009	Bayamón, Puerto Rico	2	1		
117	Glamour Boy Shane	September 27, 2009	Superestrellas de la Lucha Libre	Aguadilla, Puerto Rico	3	62	Defeat BJ, Noriega and Orlando Colón in 3-way match.	
118	Noriega	November 28, 2009	Crossfire 2009	Bayamón, Puerto Rico	3	49	Defeat BJ, Shane and Orlando Colón in a 3-way match.	
119	BJ	January 16, 2010	Superestrellas de la Lucha Libre	San Juan, Puerto Rico	3	56		
120	Ray González	March 13, 2010	Superestrellas de la Lucha Libre	Caguas, Puerto Rico	15	42		
121	Scott Steiner	April 24, 2010	Superestrellas de la Lucha Libre	Bayamón, Puerto Rico	1	35		
—	Vacated	May 29, 2010	Summer Madness 2010	Bayamón, Puerto Rico	—	—	Title held up after a match between Steiner and Ray González went to a no contest.	
122	Ray González	July 11, 2010	Aniversario 2010	Bayamón, Puerto Rico	16	20	Defeat Scott Steiner in rematch refereed by Ricky Banderas.	
123	Shelton Benjamin	July 31, 2010	La Revolución 2010	Bayamón, Puerto Rico	1	119		
124	Carlito Caribbean Cool	November 27, 2010	Crossfire 2010	Bayamón, Puerto Rico	12	42		
125	Ricky Banderas	January 8, 2011	Euphoria 2011	Bayamón, Puerto Rico	1	42		
—	Vacated	February 19, 2011	Superestrellas de la Lucha Libre	—	—	—	Title vacated when Banderas leaves to the IWA.	
126	Steve Corino	April 23, 2011	Superestrellas de la Lucha Libre	Bayamón, Puerto Rico	3	42	Defeat Carlito Caribbean Cool, Shane the Glamour Boy and Gilbert in a 4-way gauntlet match to win the vacant title.	
127	Carlito Caribbean Cool	June 4, 2011	Summer Madness 2011	Caguas, Puerto Rico	13	274		
128	Gilbert	March 4, 2012	Noche de Campeones 2012	Bayamón, Puerto Rico	1	118		
129	Apolo	June 30, 2012	Aniversario 39	Bayamón, Puerto Rico	4	70		
130	Andy Leavine	September 8, 2012	Septiembre Negro 2012	Bayamón, Puerto Rico	1	50	Defeat Apolo and Gilbert in a 3-way match.	
131	Ray González	October 28, 2012	Halloween Wrestling Xtravaganza 2012	Bayamón, Puerto Rico	17	126		
132	El Super Fénix	March 2, 2013	Superestrellas de la Lucha Libre	Cataño, Puerto Rico	2	25	Previously won the championship as Gilbert.	
133	Ray González	April 27, 2013	Superestrellas de la Lucha Libre	Bayamón, Puerto Rico	18	14		
134	Chris Angel	May 11, 2013	Summer Madness 2013	Cataño, Puerto Rico	1	189		
135	TNT	November 16, 2013	Crossfire 2013	Bayamón, Puerto Rico	2	29		
136	The Mighty Ursus	December 15, 2013	Lockout 2013	Bayamón, Puerto Rico	1	35	Defeat TNT and Chris Angel in 3-way match.	
137	TNT	January 19, 2014	Superestrellas de la Lucha Libre	Bayamón, Puerto Rico	3	48		
138	Ray González	March 8, 2014	Superestrellas de la Lucha Libre	Bayamón, Puerto Rico	19	133		
139	The Mighty Ursus	July 19, 2014	Superestrellas de la Lucha Libre	Bayamón, Puerto Rico	2	140		
140	Carlito Caribbean Cool	December 6, 2014	Lockdown 2014	Bayamón, Puerto Rico	14	29		
141	Ray González	January 4, 2015	Euphoria 2015	Mayagüez, Puerto Rico	20	13		
—	Vacated	January 17, 2015	Superestrellas de la Lucha Libre	—	—	—	Held up due to a controversy when González won the title.	
142	Carlito Caribbean Cool	January 24, 2015	La Hora de la Verdad 2015	Bayamón, Puerto Rico	15	70	Defeated Ray González in rematch.	
143	El Chicano	April 4, 2015	Camino a la Gloria 2015	Bayamón, Puerto Rico	1	119		
144	Mr. 450	August 1, 2015	Noche de Campeones 2015	Bayamón, Puerto Rico	1	218		
145	Carlito Caribbean Cool	March 6, 2016	Superestrellas de la Lucha Libre	Bayamón, Puerto Rico	16	192		
—	Vacated	September 14, 2016	En Ruta a Aniversario Día 1	Bayamón, Puerto Rico	—	—	Held up after a match between Carly Colón and Mr. 450.	
146	Carly Colón	September 18, 2016	En Ruta a Aniversario Día 2	Isabela, Puerto Rico	17	76	Defeated Mr. 450 in rematch. Had previously won the championship as Carlito Caribbean Cool	
—	Vacated	December 3, 2016	Lockout 2016	Carolina, Puerto Rico	—	—	Held up after a match between Carlito and Alberto Del Rio.	
148	Mr. 450	April 15, 2017	Camino a la Gloria 2017	Bayamón, Puerto Rico	2	1	Defeated Ray González in a tournament final.	
149	Thunder	April 16, 2017	Camino a la Gloria 2017	Arecibo, Puerto Rico	1	41	Defeated Mr. 450, Ray González and Apolo in a 4-way match.	
150	Ray González	May 27, 2017	Superestrellas de la Lucha Libre	Bayamón, Puerto Rico	21	323		
—	Vacated	April 15, 2018	Superestrellas de la Lucha Libre	Dorado, Puerto Rico	—	—	Vacated by Victor Jovica after Ray Gonzalez lost a tag team match	
152	Mighty Ursus	April 29, 2018	Superestrellas de la Lucha Libre	Dorado, Puerto Rico	3	129	Defeated Thunder for the vacant title	
153	Xavant	September 5, 2018	Superestrellas de la Lucha Libre	Guaynabo, Puerto Rico	1	206		
154	Gilbert	March 30, 2019	Superestrellas de la Lucha Libre	Morovios, Puerto Rico	3	140		
155	Orlando Colon	August 17, 2019	WWC Aniversario 46 - Day 2	Guaynabo, Puerto Rico	1	553		
156	Gilbert	February 20, 2021	Cuentas Pendientes	San Juan, Puerto Rico	4	287	Defeated Orlando Colón in a TLC match.	
157	Carlos Calderón	December 4, 2021	House Show	Ponce, Puerto Rico	1	119		
158	Xavant	April 2, 2022	House Show	Manatí, Puerto Rico	2	126	Wins a fall against Carlos Calderón for the Universal Title during a 2-fall double title match but loses Puerto Rico title in the other fall.	
159	Intelecto 5 Estrellas	August 6, 2022	Aniversario 49	Bayamón, Puerto Rico	1	532		
160	Chris Adonis	January 20, 2024	Euphoria 2024	Bayamón, Puerto Rico	1	112		
161	Intelecto 5 Estrellas	May 11, 2024	Honor vs Traición 2024	Bayamón, Puerto Rico	2	112		
162	Ray González	August 31, 2024	Aniversario 51	Bayamón, Puerto Rico	22	133		
163	Intelecto 5 Estrellas	January 11, 2025	Euphoria 2025	Bayamón, Puerto Rico	3	105		
164	Ray Gonzalez	April 26, 2025	House Show	Moca, Puerto Rico	23	14	Awarded by Gilbert.	
165	Intelecto 5 Estrellas	May 10, 2025	House Show	Salinas, Puerto Rico	4	49		
166	Chicano	June 28, 2025	La Resistencia	Bayamón, Puerto Rico	2	63	Defeat Xavant for the vacant title.	
167	Xavant	August 30, 2025	Aniversario 52	Bayamón, Puerto Rico	3	105	Defeat Chicano, Carlito Caribbean Cool and Matt Hardy in a 4 Way match for title.	
168	Andrade El Idolo	December 13, 2025	Lockout: The Closing of the Season 2025	Bayamón, Puerto Rico	1	89		
—	Vacated	March 12, 2026	—	—	—	—		
169	Intelecto 5 Estrellas	March 14, 2026	Camino a la Gloria	Bayamón, Puerto Rico	5	105	Defeated Zcion RT1 for the vacant title.	
170	Zcion RT1	June 27, 2026	Aniversario 53	San Juan, Puerto Rico	1	148+		

== Combined reigns ==
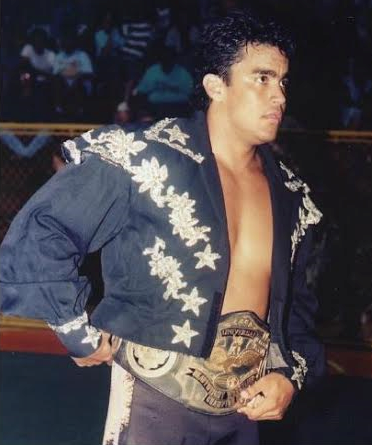
Ray González (pictured with the classic belt) is the youngest wrestler to win the title.

†	Indicates the current champion(s)
#	Indicates title reigns and changes not recognized by WWC.

Rank^{[A]}	Wrestler	No. of reigns	Combined days
1	Carlos Colón	26	3,945
2	Ray González	23	2,110
3	Carly Colón/Carlito Caribbean Cool	17	1,318
4	Intelecto 5 Estrellas	5	903
5	Orlando Colon	1	553
6	Gilbert/El Super Fénix	4	429
7	Xix Xavant	3	437
8	The Mighty Ursus	3	347
9	Abdullah the Butcher	5	338
10	Eddie Colón	5	324
11	Greg Valentine	1	237
12	Mr. 450	2	219
13	Steve Corino	3	195
14	Chris Angel	1	189
15	Chicano	2	182
16	Glamour Boy Shane	3	154
16	Razor Ramon	1	154
17	Hercules Ayala	3	152
18	El Diamante	2	147
19	La Amenaza Bryan	3	144
20	Black Pain	1	140
21	Steve Strong	1	133
22	TNT	3	120
23	Shelton Benjamin	1	119
23	Carlos Calderón	1	119
24	Chris Adonis	1	112
25	Apolo	3	111
26	El Bronco	3	98
27	BJ	3	91
28	Andrade El Idolo	1	89
29	Noriega	3	87
30	Ron Garvin	2	81
31	Dory Funk Jr.	1	80
32	Sabu	1	77
33	Jon Heidenreich	2	70
34	Invader I	2	58
35	Lightning	1	57
36	El Nene	2	56
36	Alofa the Samoan Tank	1	56
37	Leo Burke	1	54
38	Andy Leavine	1	50
39	Dutch Mantell	1	49
40	Ricky Banderas	1	42
41	Thunder	1	41
42	Scott Steiner	1	35
43	Dick Murdoch	1	34
43	Mabel	1	34
44	Abbad	1	28
44	José Rivera Jr.	1	28
45	Ox Baker	1	21
45	Konnan	1	21
45	Chicky Starr	1	21
46	Ricky Cruz	1	20
47	Jerry Flynn	1	14
—	Biggie Size	1	14
48	Pierroth, Jr.	1	13
49	Huracán Castillo	1	4
49	Curt Hennig	1	4
—	Blitz	1	4
50	Zcion RT1	1	148+
51	Vampiro	1	<1
51	Lance Hoyt	1	<1

== Footnotes ==
A. Each wrestler's total number of days as champion is ranked highest to lowest; wrestlers with the same number are tied for that certain rank.
