= WWL Americas Championship =

Professional wrestling championship

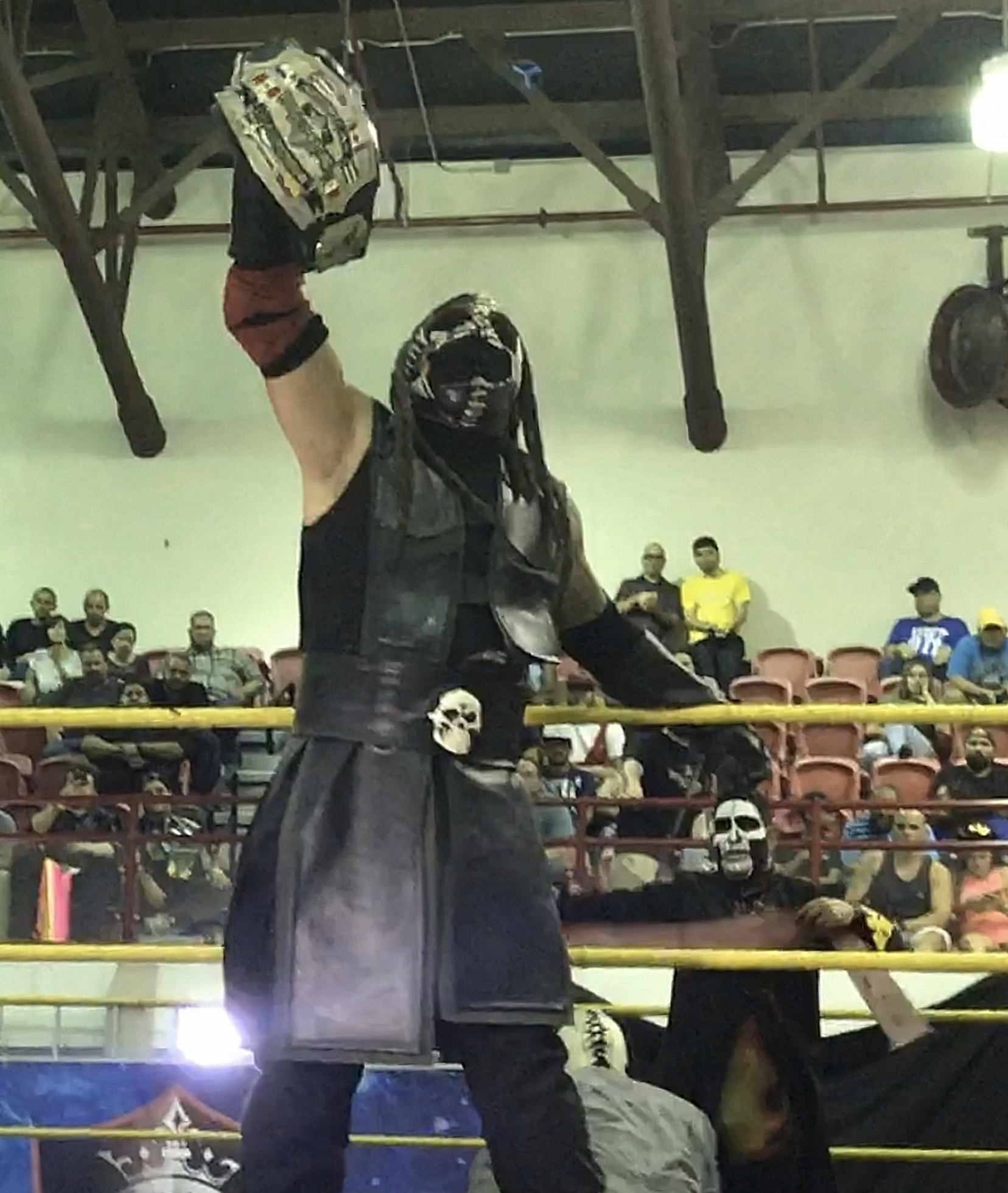
- Spectro during his incumbency.

Details
- Promotion: World Wrestling League
- Date established: October 18, 2014
- Current champion: Vacant
- Date won: July 2, 2020
Statistics
- First champion: Laredo Kid
- Most reigns: Mark Davidson (2 reigns)
- Longest reign: Spectro (447 days)
- Shortest reign: Mr. 450 (< 5 mins)
- Oldest champion: Joe Bravo (35 years)
- Youngest champion: BJ (26 years)
- Heaviest champion: Joe Bravo (227 lb (103 kg))
- Lightest champion: El Sensacional Carlitos (161 lb (73 kg))

The WWL Americas Championship (Campeonato de Las Américas de la WWL in Spanish) is a professional wrestling championship promoted by the World Wrestling League (WWL) promotion in Puerto Rico. The first champion was crowned on October 18, 2014, when Laredo Kid defeated BJ and Joe Bravo.

The championship is generally contested in professional wrestling matches, in which participants execute scripted finishes rather than contend in direct competition.

== History ==
=== International exposure ===
On September 30, 2018, incumbent Navarro debuted for Colombia Pro Wrestling by retaining the title after getting disqualified against Coastal Championship Wrestling Southeastern Heavyweight Champion Cha Cha Charlie. During the first week of January 2019, "El Hombre Bestia" Enyel defended the WWL Americas Championship in appearances for Bronx Wrestling Federation in the Dominican Republic.

== Title history ==
#	Wrestlers	Reign	Date	Days held	Location	Event	Notes	Ref
1	Laredo Kid	1	October 18, 2014	80	Bayamón, Puerto Rico	Insurrection	Defeated BJ and Joe Bravo.	
2	BJ	1	January 6, 2015	46	San Juan, Puerto Rico	Guerra de Reyes	Defeated Laredo Kid, Hiram Tua and Joe Bravo in a WWL Americas Championship Grand Prix Match.	
3	Mr. 450	1	February 21, 2015	0	Ponce, Puerto Rico	Rebellion En El Sur		
4	Joe Bravo	1	February 21, 2015	123	Ponce, Puerto Rico	Rebellion En El Sur		
5	El Sensacional Carlitos	1	June 24, 2015	126	San Juan, Puerto Rico	WWL High Voltage #11	It aired on tape delay on July 4, 2015	
–	Vacant	–	October 28, 2015	–			When left the promotion.	
6	"Big Daddy" Montes	1	August 13, 2016	126	Arecibo, Puerto Rico	WWL Summer Blast	Won a Fatal 4-way match against Manny Ferno, 5to Elemento and Payatronic. It aired on tape delay on Sept. 1, 2016	
7	Wonderful Xander	1	December 17, 2016	42	Bayamon, Puerto Rico	WWL Christmas in P.R.	It aired on Youtube on January 9, 2017	
8	Spectro	1	January 28, 2017	447	Bayamon, Puerto Rico	WWL High Voltage Live!		
9	JC Navarro	1	April 20, 2018	239	Dorado, Puerto Rico	Juicio Final		
10	El Hombre Bestia	1	December 15, 2018	138	Dorado, Puerto Rico	WWL Black Xmas		
–	Vacant	–	May 2, 2019	–			El Hombre Bestia left WWL after Economical disagreements that same day when wwl made the official announcement El Hombre Bestia make a video in the social network of facebook dropping the title in a trash bag saying he want more money	
11	Mark Davidson	1	May 17, 2019	204	Dorado, Puerto Rico	WWL Apuesta Letal		
12	Justin Dynamite	1	December 7, 2019	38	Bayamón, Puerto Rico			
-	Vacant	-	January 14, 2020	-	Bayamón, Puerto Rico		After Justin Dynamite left from WWL.	
13	Mark Davidson	2	January 20, 2020	164	Maunabo, Puerto Rico		Title awarded.	
–	Vacant	–	July 2, 2020	–			When WWL closes.	
