= Ray Apollon =

Trinidadian professional wrestler

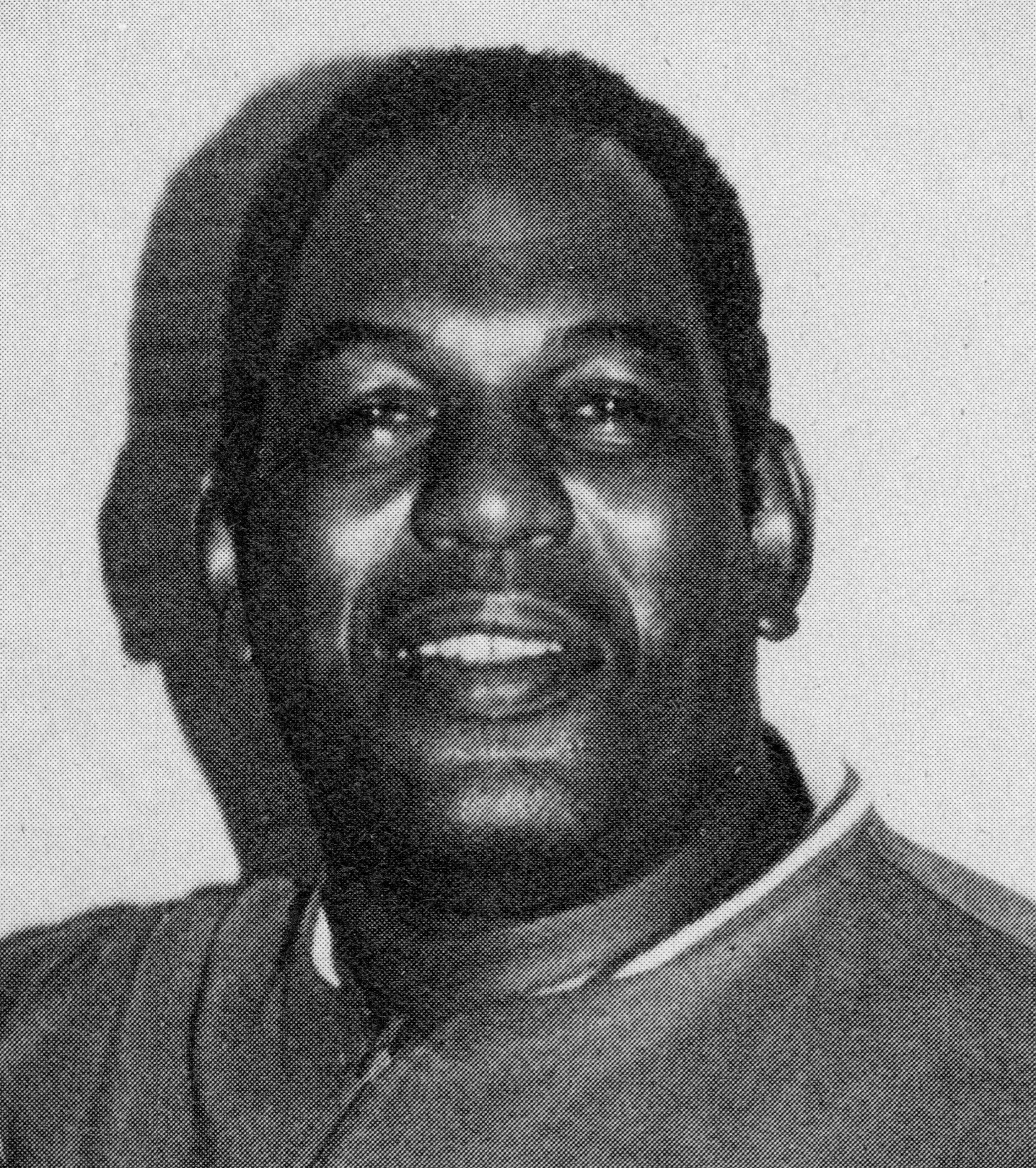

Ray "Golden" Apollon, born Cyril Joseph, (April 26, 1924–February 4, 1997) was a professional wrestler from the island of Trinidad.

Apollon studied at St. Mary's College in Trinidad and graduated with a Bachelor of Arts Honours Degree from Howard University in Washington, D.C. He traveled to France to study medicine at the Sorbonne University, to become a doctor like his father. Once in Europe, though, he became interested in wrestling and became a professional wrestler. He worked in Asia, the Middle East, Africa, Europe, and Trinidad. He was made a Chief of Nigeria and nicknamed the "Lion King". In Kenya, he stayed at the house of the president, Jomo Kenyatta. He was known for his headbutts, particularly the "coconut butt". His students included Ted Herbert, Des the Artist, Thunderbolt Williams, and his son Fernando.

== Personal life ==
Ray Apollon (born Cyril Cornelius Joseph) was born in New York and moved to Trinidad at the age of 2. In his adult life, Ray Apollon was married to Elaine, with whom he had two daughters, Wendy and Wanda. After separation, during his travels in Europe, he met Almher Radlher, with whom he had a son, Cyril. Later on, in his travels in India, he met Suzanne Parisot and settled with her in Trinidad. They had two sons, Fernando and Raymond, and he also raised Suzanne’s daughter, Angélique, as his own.

== Championships and accomplishments ==
- World Wrestling Council

- WWC Caribbean Heavyweight Championship (1 time)

- Trinidad and Tobago Wrestling Association

- TTWA World Heavyweight Championship (1 time)
- TTWA World Tag Team Championship (1 time) - with Thunderbolt William
