= WWL World Tag Team Championship =

Professional wrestling tag team championship

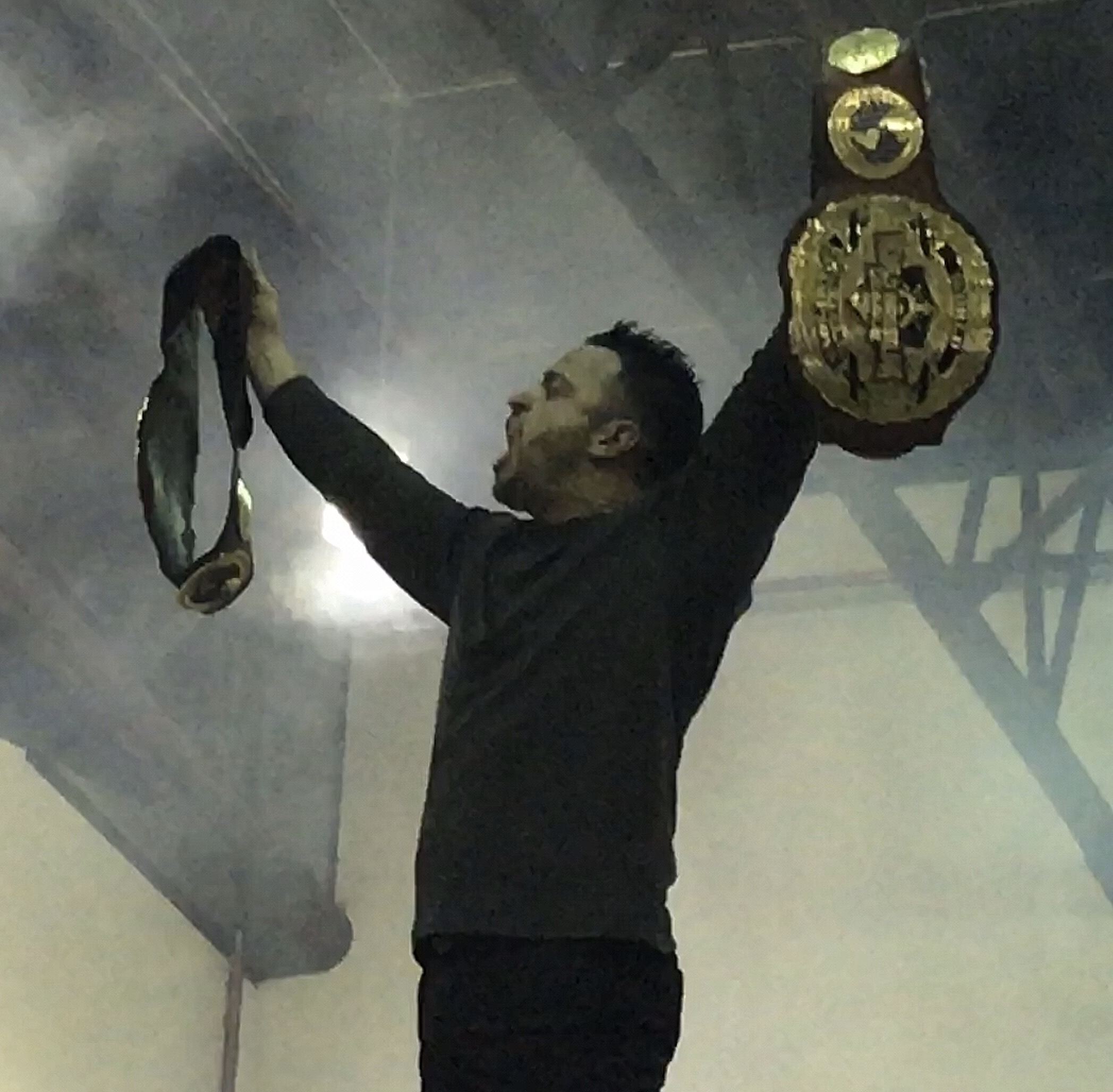
- Richard Rondón, manager of Khaos and Abbadon, holding both belts during their incumbency.

Details
- Promotion: World Wrestling League
- Date established: July 7, 2013
- Current champion: Vacant
- Date won: July 2, 2020
Statistics
- First champion: Los Mamitos
- Most reigns: As team:(Thunder and Lightning) (4 reigns) As individual: Mr. E / Escobar (4 reigns)
- Longest reign: Los Mamitos (463 days)
- Shortest reign: Escobar and Wonderful Xander and Los Héroes del Ring (1 day)
- Oldest champion: Thunder (42 years)
- Youngest champion: Mr. E (33 years)
- Heaviest champion: Thunder and Lightning (580 lb)
- Lightest champion: Los Mamitos (506 lb.)

The WWL Tag Team Championship is a professional wrestling world tag team championship in WWL. It was established as the tag team title for the promotion on July 7, 2013.

== History ==
On February 24, 2018, four champion teams -La Revolución presenting WWC, Westside Mafia representing WWL, Los Fujitivos representing CWA and Smoke and Nightmare representing CWS- competed in a match where the team pinned would drop their titles to the winners. The Westside Mafia was not involved in the result, which saw the CWA titlists best their CWS counterparts.

On February 2, 2019, incumbents Los Primos Meléndez became involved in another interpromotional storyline, when CWA World Tag Team Champions Los Fujitivos challenged them. For Todo o Nada, both sets are scheduled to be on the line in an unification match that also includes the Latin American Xchange besides the titlists.

== Title history ==
#	Team Name / Wrestlers	Reign	Date	Days held	Location	Event	Notes	Ref
1	Los Mamitos (Mr. E and Sexy B)	1	July 7, 2013	463	Monterrey, Nuevo León, Mexico	Dream Matches Tour (2013)	Los Mamitos defeated Eita and Tomahawk, El Hijo de Kato Kung Lee and Vengador Radioactivo, and Heddi Karaoui and Zumbi in a four way match to become the inaugural champions.	
	Vacant	—	October 13, 2014	—		N/A	Declared vacant when Sexy B. has Knee injured.	
2	Artillería Pesada (Thunder and Lightning)	1	October 18, 2014	80	Bayamon, Puerto Rico	Insurrection	Defeated Eric Escobar and Abbad.	
3	Legio (Spectro and Kronya)	1	January 6, 2015	74	San Juan, Puerto Rico	Guerra de Reyes		
4	Artillería Pesada (Thunder and Lightning)	2	March 21, 2015	147	Bayamon, Puerto Rico	International Cup	This was a Casket Match. It aired on tape delay on April 25, 2015	
5	La Verdadera Artillería Pesada (Thunder II and Lightning II)	1	August 15, 2015	35	Toa Baja, Puerto Rico	Sin Piedad	This is an unknown tag team masked like La Artilleria Pesada	
6	Artillería Pesada (Thunder and Lightning)	3	September 19, 2015	39	Bayamon, Puerto Rico	Wrestlefest		
–	Vacant	–	October 28, 2015	–			When Champions left the promotion.	
7	El Concilio Cubano (Escobar and Bryan)	2	April 4, 2016	75	-	WWL High Voltage #2 - Third Season	Formerly known as Los Mamitos (Sexy B. and Mr. E). Declared themselves champions and then by Richard Negrin.	
8	Escobar ^{(3)} and Wonderful Xander	1	June 18, 2016	0	Canovanas, Puerto Rico	WWL High Voltage #13 - Third Season	Escobar chooses Wonderful Xander when Bryan didn't show. This episode aired on tape delay on June 27, 2016.	
9	Los Héroes del Ring (Galáctico and Planetario)	1	June 18, 2016	0	Canovanas, Puerto Rico	WWL High Voltage #13 - Third Season	Defeated Wonderful Xander and Escobar. This episode aired on tape delay on June 27, 2016.	
10	Escobar ^{(4)} and Wonderful Xander ^{(2)}	2	June 18, 2016	28	Canovanas, Puerto Rico	WWL High Voltage #16 - Third Season	This episode didn't air due technical problems, It aired on Youtube on July 22, 2016.	
11	La Potencia (Nemesis and Wonka)	1	July 16, 2016	28	Canovanas, Puerto Rico	WWL High Voltage #18 - Third Season	This episode aired on tape delay on August 04, 2016.	
12	Khaos and Abbadon	1	August 13, 2016	35	Arecibo, Puerto Rico	WWL Summer Blast (2016)	This episode aired on tape delay on September 1, 2016.	
13	La Potencia (Nemesis and Wonka)	2	September 17, 2016	49	Carolina, Puerto Rico	WWL High Voltage Live!	Didn't Air on Youtube.	
14	Khaos and Abbadon	2	November 5, 2016	189	Cataño, Puerto Rico	WWL Implosion	This episode aired on Youtube on November 12, 2016.	
15	West Side Mafia (Morgan and Tabú)	1	May 13, 2017	378	Juncos, Puerto Rico	WWL Golpe de Estado	This was a triple threat match also including Holy Fashion (Mike Mendoza and Angel Fashion).	
16	Los Primos Meléndez (Víctor and Alex)	1	May 26, 2018	84	Guaynabo, Puerto Rico	WWL Golpe de Estado	This was a triple threat match also including Holy Fashion (Mike Mendoza and Angel Fashion).	
17	West Side Mafia (Morgan and Tabú)	2	August 18, 2018	119	Dorado, Puerto Rico	WWL High Voltage Live!	This was a triple threat match also including Holy Fashion (Mike Mendoza and Angel Fashion).	
18	Los Primos Meléndez (Víctor and Alex)	2	December 15, 2018	90	Dorado, Puerto Rico	WWL Black Xmas		
19	Latin American Xchange (Ortiz and Santana)	1	March 15, 2019	148	Dorado, Puerto Rico	WWL Todo o Nada		
20	La Artilleria Pesada (Thunder & Lightning)	4	August 10, 2019	193	San Juan, Puerto Rico	Pena Capital		
21	Los Primos Meléndez (Víctor and Alex)	3	February 9, 2020	144		El Fin		
–	Vacant	–	July 2, 2020	–			Company on hiatus since pandemic	
