= Huracán Castillo =

American professional wrestler

Personal information
- Born: Pedro Castillo Cuba
- Died: December 11, 1993

Professional wrestling career
- Ring name(s): Huracán Castillo; La Enciclopedia Huracán Castillo; Fidel Castillo; Joe Castro; Cyclone Castro; Huracán Castillo Sr.
- Billed height: 6 ft 1 in (1.85 m)
- Billed weight: 224 lb (102 kg)
- Debut: 1967
- Retired: 1984

Pedro Castillo was a Cuban-Puerto Rican professional wrestler who was known as Hurcan Castillo and Fidel Castillo during the 1970s in Puerto Rico, Canada, United States and Japan.

== Career ==
Castillo made his professional wrestling debut in 1967 in Florida. In 1969, he made his debut in Montreal as Fidel Castillo where he teamed with Abdullah the Butcher. In 1970, he teamed with Michel DuBois in Montreal and later Atlanta in 1971. In 1972, he began teaming with his "brother" Raoul in Cleveland. They worked in Puerto Rico, Montreal, Calgary and Japan.

Castillo retired from being a professional wrestler after his match with Randy Savage in 1984. Later, Castillo became the WWC Commissioner, which led to come out of retirement for a rivalry with Chicky Starr. In 1987, he started working as the manager of Karateca Ninja, TNT.

== Personal life ==
Castillo's son Jesus Castillo wrestled for the WWE in the late 1990s as a member of the Los Boricuas.

Castillo passed away on December 11, 1993, from a heart attack.

== Championships and accomplishments ==
- Stampede Wrestling
  - Stampede International Tag Team Championship (1 time) with Raoul Castillo
- World Wrestling Council
  - WWC Caribbean Heavyweight Championship (2 times)
  - WWC North American Tag Team Championship (3 times) - with Carlos Colon (1), Cyclone Negro (1) and Raoul Castillo (1)
  - WWC Puerto Rico Heavyweight Championship (1 time)
  - WWC World Tag Team Championship (1 time) - with Frenchy Martin
