= Joe Bravo (wrestler) =

Dominicano professional wrestler

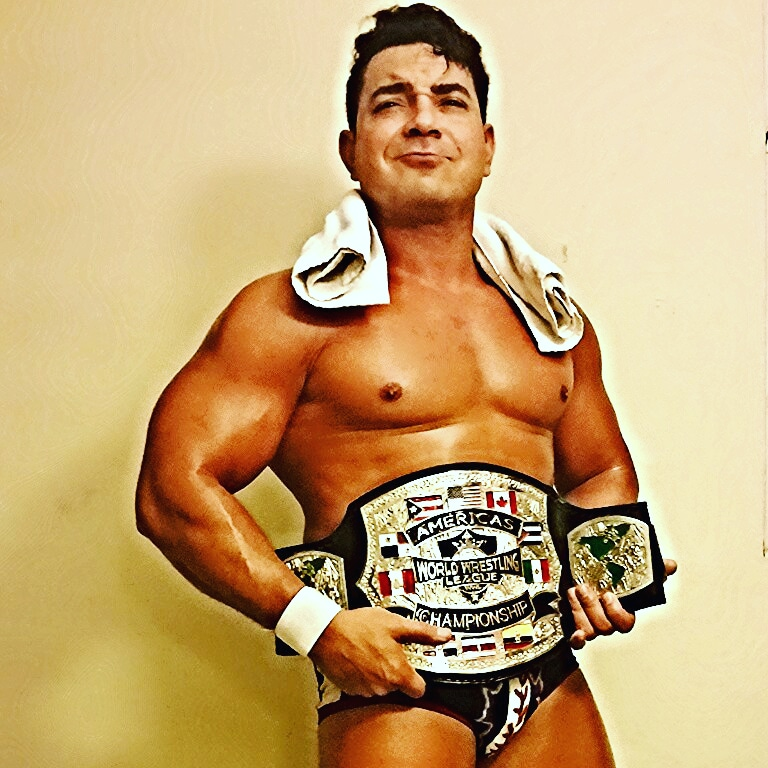

Personal information
- Born: Wilkyns Nuñez; March 14 Montecristi, Dominican Republic

Professional wrestling career
- Ring name(s): "El Latino Dorado" Joe Bravo; El Caballero Negro; Joseph El Profeta; The Gentlemen Joe Bravo
- Billed height: 5 ft 10 in (178 cm)
- Billed weight: 226 lb (103 kg)
- Trained by: Bronco #1
- Debut: 2003

Wilkyns Nuñez, better known by his ring name Joe Bravo, is a Dominican professional wrestler best known for performing with the International Wrestling Association and World Wrestling Council.

== Professional career ==
=== International Wrestling Association (2006–2007) ===
On July 29, 2006, Bravo won the first José Miguel Pérez Cup. On January 6, 2007, he made a heel turn, joining a stable known as Caballeros dela Revolución along El Diamante, Diabolico and La Morena. The team feuded with La Calle, the company's dominant face group. On April 21, 2007, Bravo began an angle with Chicano over the World Heavyweight Championship, losing to him on April 28, 2007. After several months outside of the company, Bravo returned to the company on the second José Miguel Pérez Cup, awarding the cup to the tournament winner, before attacking him during the ceremony. He would subsequently leave the company.

=== World Wrestling Council (2007–2008) ===
In 2007, Bravo returned to the World Wrestling Council, wrestling under a gimmick where he received a "El Caballero Negro" to do whatever he wanted within the company.

=== International Wrestling Association (2008–2010) ===
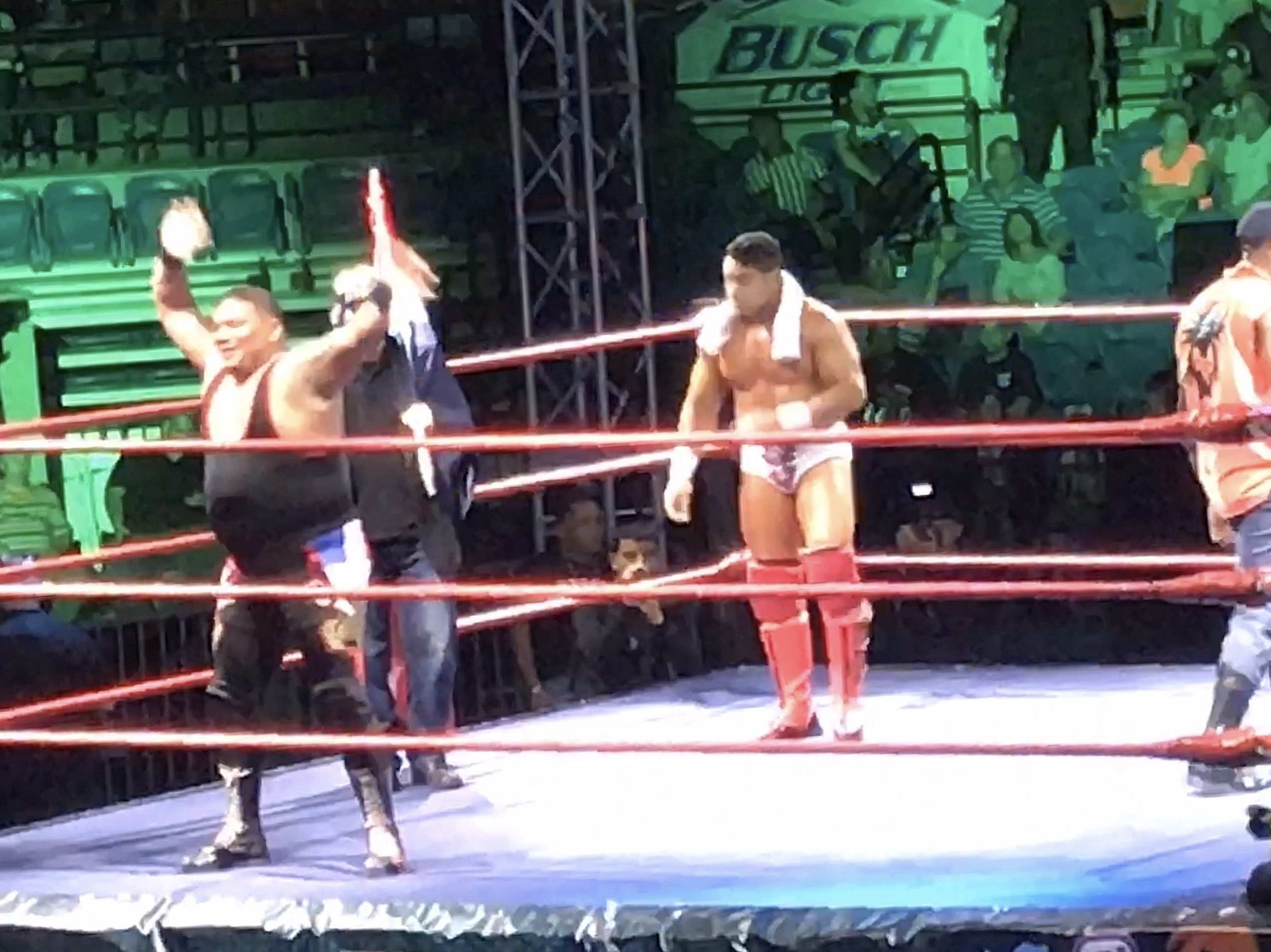
Los Caballeros de la Revolución.

On June 28, 2008, Bravo returned to the International Wrestling Association. Here he was involved in an angle were Savio Vega's stable, the Auntenticos, "kidnapped" him, which led to a save attempt by the face wrestlers. Upon being "rescued" Bravo turned on the wrestlers, revealing an alliance with Vega. On July 5, 2008, Vega announced that Bravo would face Chicano in a first contender's match, with the winner receiving an opportunity for the IWA World Heavyweight Championship. He would win this match, after receiving help from the Auntenticos. On July 19, 2008, Bravo defeated Blitz to win the heavyweight championship at an event titled Summer Attitude 2008.

On February 22, 2009, Bravo participated in a show of the Dominican Wrestling Entertainment, based in the Dominican Republic. In this event, he was part of a Royal Rumble to crown the first DWE Dominican National Champion, which he won. On April 18, 2009, Bravo challenged Chicano, the incumbent IWA World Heavyweight Champion, to an unificatory contest. Bravo won, becoming a dual champion. The title was subsequently stripped and remained vacant for a week, before Bravo regained it by defeating Cotto and Ring of Honor's World Heavyweight Champion Jerry Lynn. On May 29, 2009, Bravo defended the titles in a Revolution X-Treme Wrestling card held in Panama, defeating El Cuervo. At a tournament named "Copa Alcalde Hon. Jose Rosario", Bravo dropped the IWA World Heavyweight Championship to Miguel Pérez, Jr. On October 3, 2009, he won the IWA Intercontinental Championship. Two weeks later, Bravo was booked to defeat Pérez in an unification match, becoming a tri-champion. On November 1, 2009, Bravo and the incumbent WWC Universal Heavyweight Champion, Shane Sewell, performed in a DWE event, with the DWE Dominican National Championship being held up after the creative team booked a no contest. This marked the first instance that the two major champions worked together while holding full recognitions by both promotions.

=== World Wrestling Council (2010–2011) ===
On September 18, 2010, episode of "Superestrellas de la Lucha Libre", Bravo made an appearance in a brief segment in which he was reunited with Gilbert another former IWA who was sent to finish with Ray Gonzalez when both were members of Club Elite in IWA. Became a face and feuded with Gilbert but went back to his heel ways and form an odd couple tag team with La Maravilla BJ.

== Championships and accomplishments ==
- Bronx Wrestling Federation
  - BWF Tag Team Championship (1 time) - with Bronco International
- Dominican Wrestling Entertainment
  - DWE Dominican Republic Heavyweight Championship (1 time)
- International Wrestling Association
  - IWA World Heavyweight Championship (5 times)
  - IWA Intercontinental Championship (3 times)
  - IWA World Tag Team Championship (1 time) - with Bakano, Diamante, Diabólico, Elí Rodríguez and Balbuena as La Revolución Dominicana
  - IWA Hardcore Championship (1 time)
  - José Miguel Pérez Memorial Cup (2006)
- Pro Wrestling Illustrated
  - Ranked No. 292 of the top 500 wrestlers in the PWI 500 in 2008
- World Wrestling Council
  - WWC Caribbean Heavyweight Championship (1 time)
  - WWC Puerto Rico Heavyweight Championship (1 time)
  - WWC World Tag Team Championship (3 times) - with Vengador Boricua (2) and BJ (1)
- World Wrestling League

- WWL Americas Championship (1 time)
