= Thunder and Lightning (professional wrestling) =

Puerto Rican Professional wrestling team

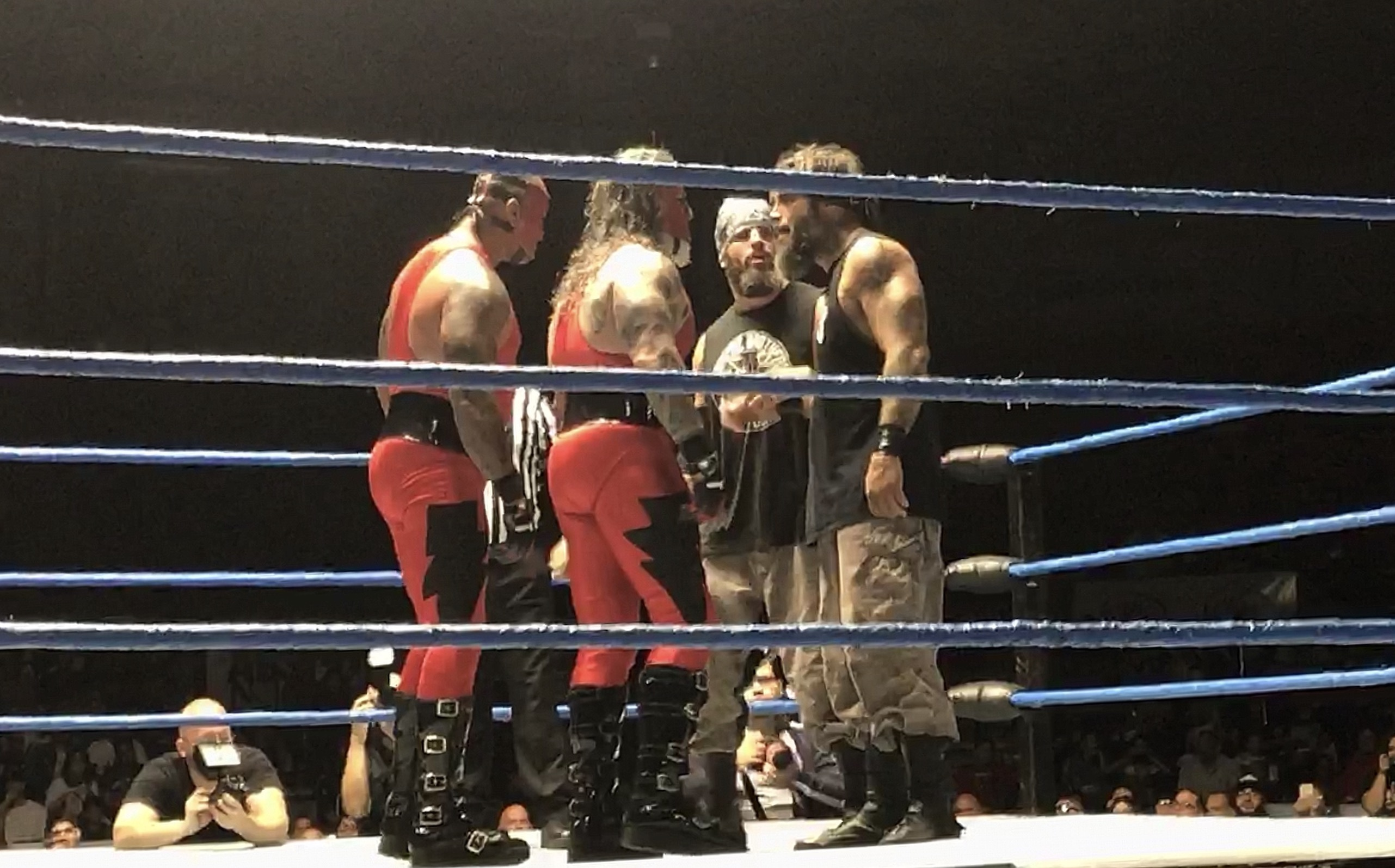
- Thunder and Lightning face The Briscoe Brothers at WWC Aniversario 2018.

Statistics
- Members: Thunder; Lightning
- Name(s): Thunder and Lightning; La Artilleria Pesada
- Billed heights: 5 ft 10 in (1.78 m) (Thunder); 6 ft 1 in (1.85 m) (Lightning)
- Combined billed weight: 250 lb (110 kg) (Thunder); 230 lb (100 kg) (Lightning)
- Debut: 2000
- Trained by: Isaac Rosario

Thunder and Lightning is a Puerto Rican professional wrestling tag team consisting of Reynaldo Rodriguez (born December 3, 1972, in Bayamón, Puerto Rico) and Alex Cruz (born October 18, 1975, in Bayamón, Puerto Rico) under the ring names Thunder and Lightning respectively. They currently work for World Wrestling Council.

== Career ==
=== World Wrestling Council (2000–2003; 2007–2011, 2011–2013) ===
Both members trained in various small independent Puerto Rico wrestling federations, before signing with Puerto Rico's World Wrestling Council, the major wrestling federation on the island at the time, in April 2000 where the two men would join under the "Thunder and Lightning" gimmick. They won 10 WWC Tag Team titles together from April 2000 to August 2003 when they left the company for the IWA. Both men returned to WWC joined by their former manager Barrabás on June 23, 2007, in Bayamon, Puerto Rico. They returned to WWC at Aniversario 2011 and face Los Fugitivos de la Calle. On June 30, 2012, Thunder and Lightning lost their masks to Carlito and Ray González in a Masks vs. Hairs match. On February 9, 2013, Thunder & Lightning were betrayed by Barrabás and later reunited by Ray González.

=== International Wrestling Association (2003–2007; 2011) ===
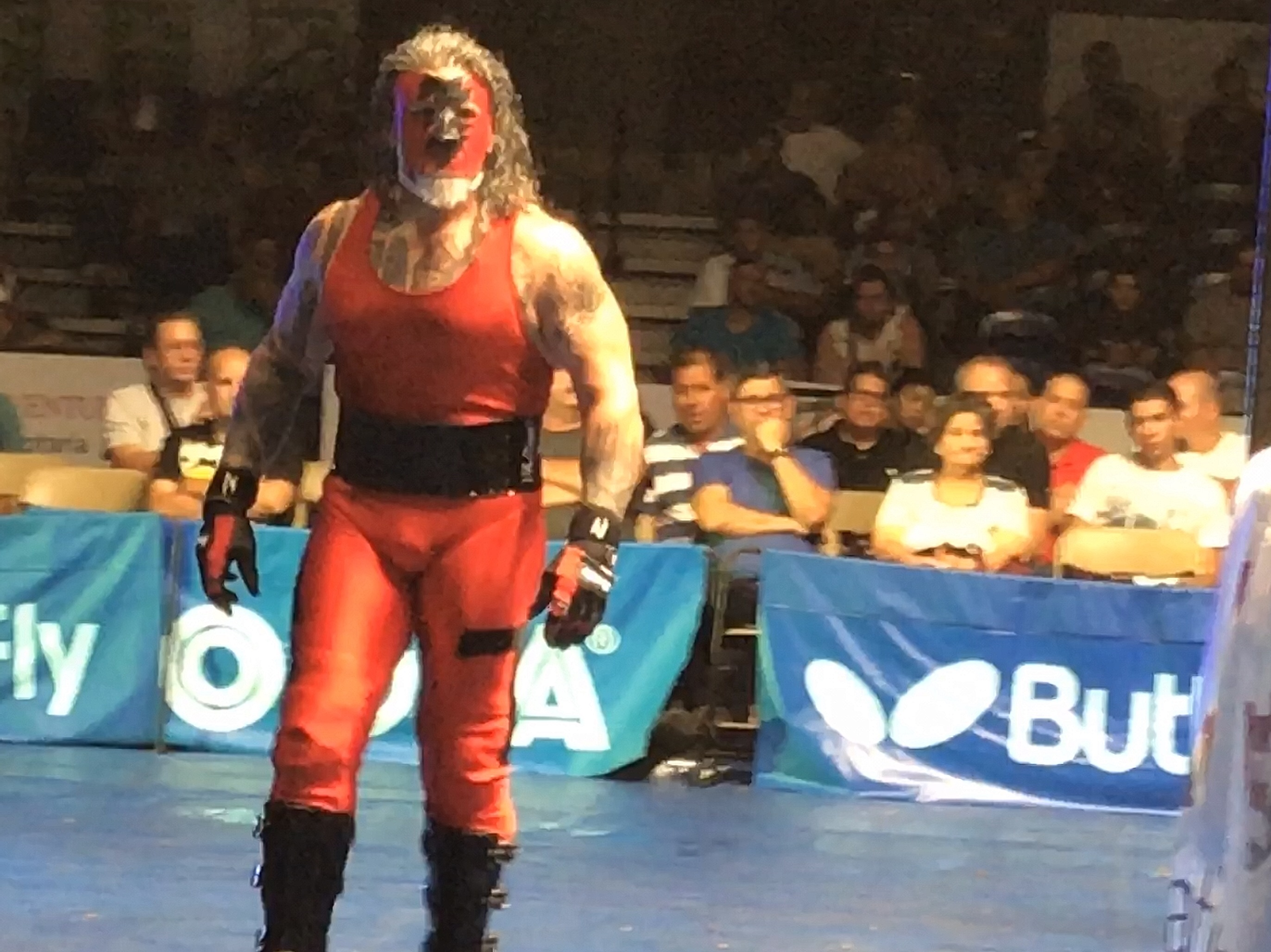
Thunder

Lightning tried his hand in at a singles career and soon defeated Savio Vega for the IWA Heavyweight Championship on June 17, 2006, although he would only hold the title a few weeks before losing it to Mikael Judas. The pair held the IWA World Tag Team Title several times, the fourth reign was ended by defeat to Golden Boy and Noriega. On January 21, 2011, IWA announced the official return of Thunder & Lightning. During the summer they left IWA.

=== New Professional Wrestling (2011–2012) ===
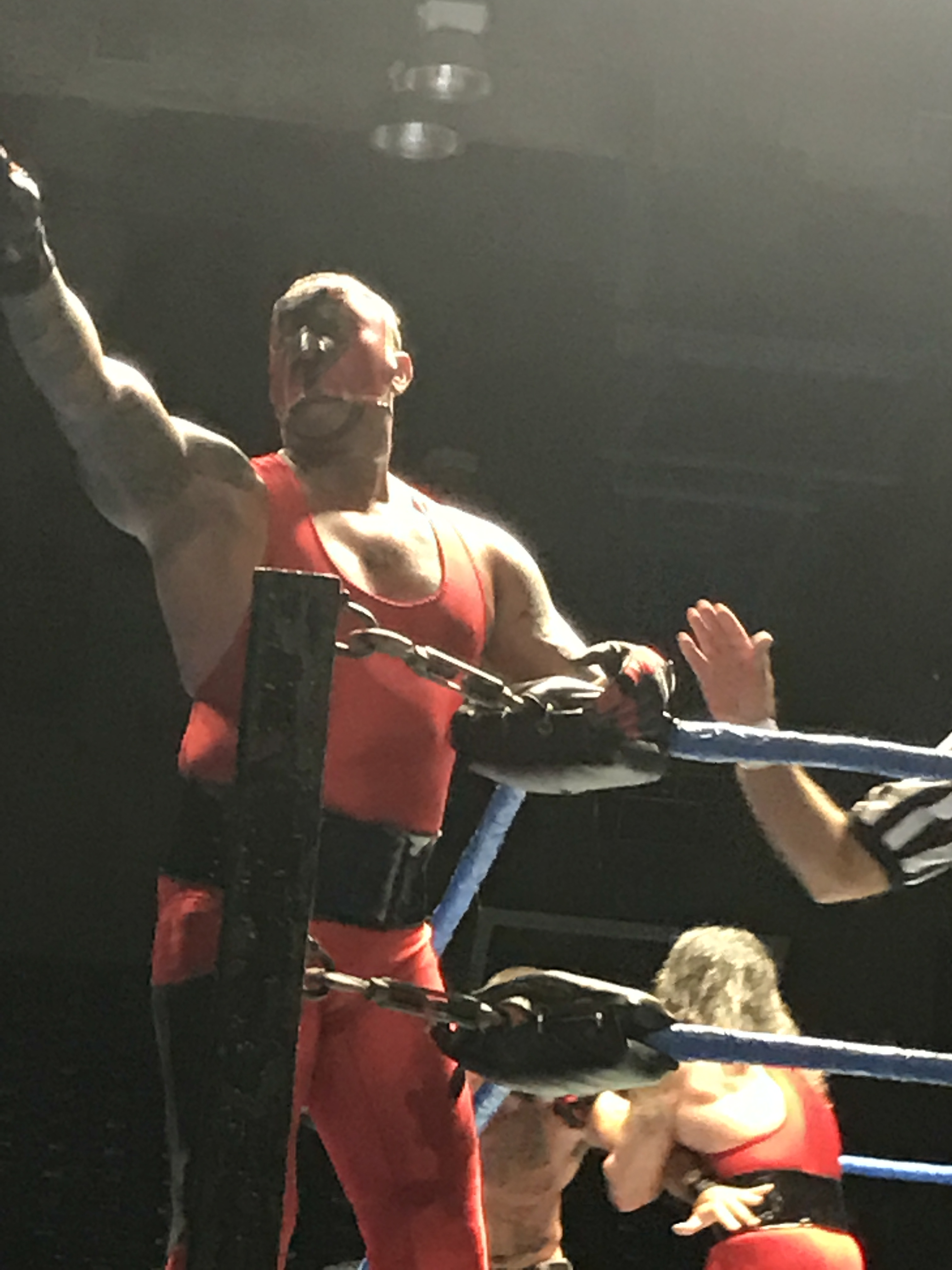
Lightning

On October 1, 2011, both men made a surprise appearance at New Professional Wrestling "Genesis" Anniversary Show in Aquas Buenas, Puerto Rico. There they challenged the companies then Tag Team Champions Death & Nemesis. On November 17, 2011, at the NPW "November 2 Remember" show Thunder and Lightning were crowned new NPW World Tag Team Champions in Gurabo, Puerto Rico.

During this time, a facsimile known as Los Tornados also began appearing in independent promotions such as Championship Wrestling Factory (CWF), eventually making their way to the Puerto Rico Wrestling Alliance (PRWA) where the similarities were emphasized by bringing in Barrabás to manage them.

=== Return to WWC (2012–2014) ===
The tag team eventually returned to WWC wearing a different outfit and became known as "Los Enmascarados" for some time. Under these characters Thunder and Lightning defeated the incumbent WWE Tag Team Champions, Primo & Epico, in the undercard of La Revolución 2012.

For Thunder and Lightning's return match, WWC scheduled a rematch between them and Los Matadores (formerly Primo & Epico) for Euphoria 2014.

=== World Wrestling League (2014–2015) ===
On October 18, 2014, Thunder and Lightning won the vacant WWL World Tag Team Championships. During the match, they debuted their new outfits and brought back their masks. On January 6, 2015, they lost the titles against Spectro and Kronya, but Thunder and Lightning regained the titles on March 21, 2015.

=== Return to WWC (2015–2019) ===
The tag team eventually returned to WWC to begin a feud with current WWC Tag Team Champions "La Revolucion". On December 5, 2015, Thunder and Lightning failed in regaining the WWC World Tag Team Championship . They were booked to have a rematch for the WWC Tag Team titles in a Tag Team Triple Thread Match involving Sons Of Samoa (Tahitian Warrior and Manu) on Euphoria 2016.

== Championships and accomplishments ==
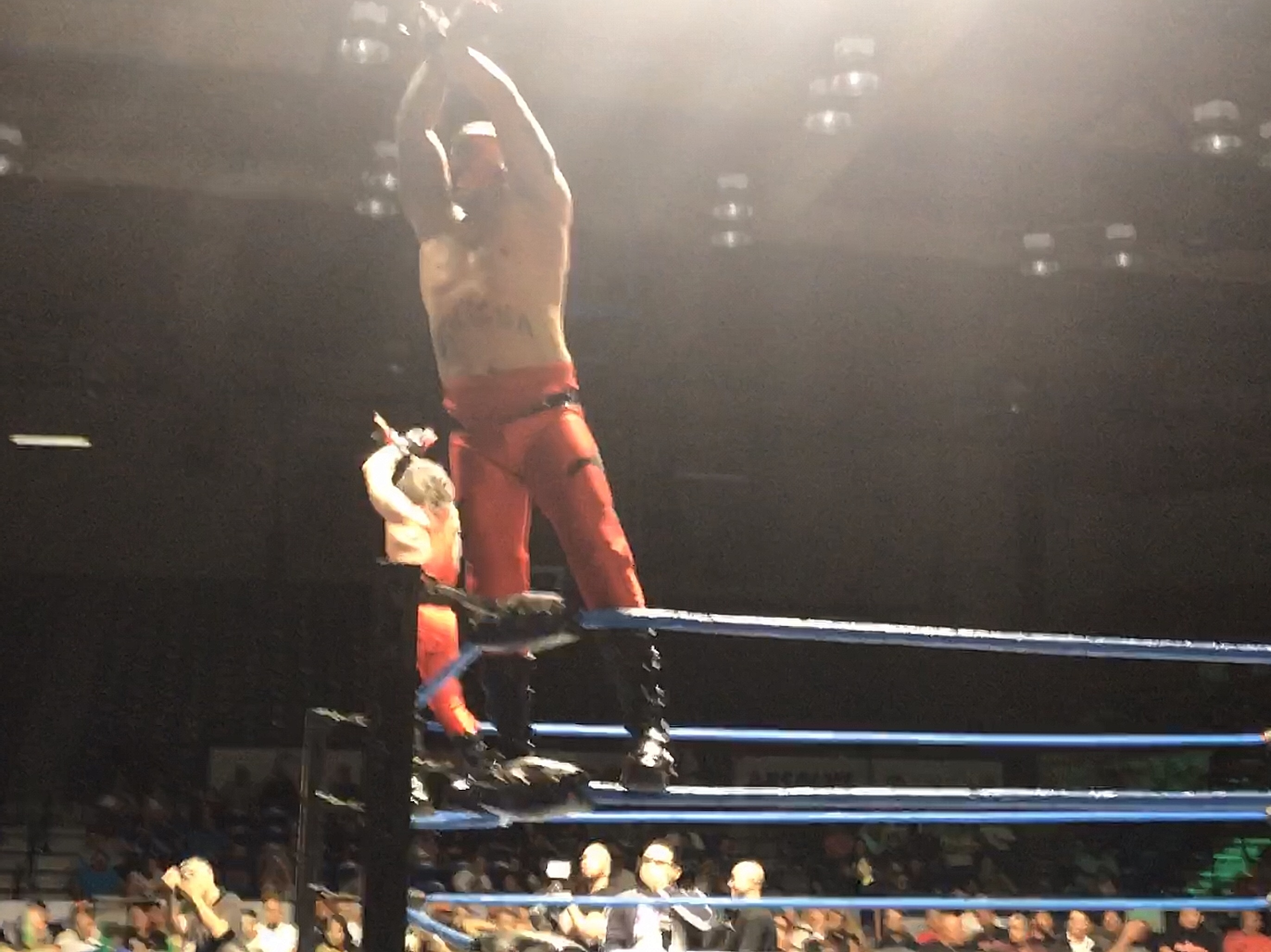
Thunder and Lightning's victory pose.

- Cleveland Knights Championship Wrestling

- CKCW World Tag Team Championship (1 time)

- International Wrestling Association

- IWA World Heavyweight Championship (2 times) - Lightning
- IWA Intercontinental Championship (1 time) - Lightning
- IWA World Tag Team Championship (8 times) - together (7), Lightning & Anarchy (1)

- New Pro Wrestling

- NPW World Tag Team Championship (1 time)

- World Wrestling Council

- WWC Universal Heavyweight Championship (2 times) - Thunder (1) & Lightning (1)
- WWC Puerto Rico Heavyweight Championship (2 times) - Lightning
- WWC Television Championship (1 time) - Lightning
- WWC Caribbean Heavyweight Championship (1 time) - Lightning
- WWC World Tag Team Championship (32 times) - together (29) and Lightning & Chicano (2), Lightning & Mr. Big (1)

- World Wrestling League

- WWL World Tag Team Championship (4 times)

== In popular culture ==
The tag team inspired the song Thunder y Lightning by Bad Bunny.

== See also ==
- Professional wrestling in Puerto Rico
