= 1986 in professional wrestling =

1986 in professional wrestling describes the year's events in the world of professional wrestling.

== List of notable promotions ==
These promotions held notable events in 1986.

Promotion Name	Abbreviation
American Wrestling Association	AWA
Championship Wrestling from Florida	CWF
Empresa Mexicana de Lucha Libre	EMLL
Jim Crockett Promotions	JCP
National Wrestling Alliance	NWA
New Japan Pro Wrestling	NJPW
Pacific Northwest Wrestling	PNW
Polynesian Pro Wrestling	PPP
World Class Championship Wrestling	WCCW
World Wrestling Council	WWC
World Wrestling Federation	WWF

== Calendar of notable shows ==
Date	Promotion(s)	Event	Location	Main Event
January 21	PNW	Superstar Extravaganza	Portland, Oregon	Ric Flair (c) defeated Dusty Rhodes by disqualification in a singles match for the NWA World Heavyweight Championship
February 7	JCP	Superstars on the Superstation	Atlanta, Georgia	Ric Flair (c) defeated Ron Garvin in a singles match for the NWA World Heavyweight Championship
February 14	CWF	Battle of the Belts II	Orlando, Florida	Ric Flair (c) fought Barry Windham to a double count-out in a singles match for the NWA World Heavyweight Championship
February 15	WWF	Saturday Night's Main Event	Phoenix, Arizona	Hulk Hogan (c) defeated The Magnificent Muraco by disqualification in a singles match for the WWF World Heavyweight Championship
February 15	AJW	All Japan Women's event at Kawasaki-shi Taiikukan	Kawasaki, Japan	Jaguar Yokota has her retirement match in a 5-minute exhibition match against Devil Masami
April 5	AJW	All Japan Women's event at Ryōgoku Kokugikan	Tokyo, Japan	Jaguar Yokota vs Devil Masami (c) in a WWWA World Title Match, Chigusa Nagayo vs Dump Matsumoto in a All Pacific Title match
April 7	WWF	WrestleMania 2	Uniondale, New York; Rosemont, Illinois; Los Angeles, California	Hulk Hogan (c) defeated King Kong Bundy in a steel Cage match for the WWF World Heavyweight Championship
April 19	JCP	1st Annual Jim Crockett Sr. Memorial Cup Tag Team Tournament	New Orleans, Louisiana	The Road Warriors (Animal and Hawk) defeated Ron Garvin and Magnum T. A. in a tournament final
April 20	AWA	WrestleRock 86	East Rutherford, New Jersey	Nick Bockwinkel defeated Stan Hansen (c) by disqualification in a singles match for the AWA World Heavyweight Championship
April 28	AWA / NWA	Rage in a Cage	Minneapolis, Minnesota	The Road Warriors (Road Warrior Hawk & Road Warrior Animal) defeated Ivan Koloff & Nikita Koloff in a Steel Cage Match
May 1	WWF	Saturday Night's Main Event	Providence, Rhode Island	Hulk Hogan and Junkyard Dog defeated Terry Funk and Hoss Funk in a tag team match
May 4	WCCW	3rd Von Erich Memorial Parade of Champions	Irving, Texas	Steve Simpson, Kerry Von Erich and Lance Von Erich defeated the Fabulous Freebirds (Michael Hayes, Terry Gordy and Buddy Roberts) (c) in a Lumberjack elimination match for the WCWA World Six-Man Tag Team Championship
June 19	NJPW	IWGP League	Tokyo, Japan	Antonio Inoki defeated Dick Murdoch in the finals
June 22	AJW	Japan Grand Prix	Tokyo, Japan	Chigusa Nagayo defeated Yukari Omori in the finals
June 28	AWA	Battle By The Bay	Oakland, California	Larry Zbyszko fought Scott LeDoux to a double count-out in a singles match
July 1 – August 2	JCP	The Great American Bash (1986)	Multiple	Various
July 14	WWF	King of the Ring (1986)	Foxborough, Massachusetts	British Bulldogs (Davey Boy Smith and The Dynamite Kid) (c) defeated The Dream Team (Greg Valentine and Brutus Beefcake) in a steel cage match for the WWF World Tag Team Championship
August 9	PPP	A Hot Summer Night II	Honolulu, Hawaii	Superfly Tui fought Lars Anderson in a Steel Cage Match for the NWA Polynesian Pacific Heavyweight Championship
August 23	AJW	All Japan Women's event at Kawasaki-shi Taiikukan	Kawasaki, Japan	Devil Masami (c) defeats Yukari Omori in a WWWA World Title match
August 28	WWF	The Big Event	Toronto, Ontario	Hulk Hogan (c) defeated Paul Orndorff via disqualification in a singles match for the WWF World Heavyweight Championship
August 29	WWF	Sam Muchnick Memorial Tournament	St. Louis, Missouri	Hulk Hogan (c) and Paul Orndorff fought to a double-disqualification in a singles match for the WWF World Heavyweight Championship
September 13	WWF	Saturday Night's Main Event	Richfield, Ohio	Hulk Hogan (c) defeated Paul Orndorff by disqualification in a singles match for the WWF World Heavyweight Championship
September 19	EMLL	EMLL 53rd Anniversary Show	Mexico City, Mexico	Américo Rocca, Tony Salazar and Ringo Mendoza defeated Los Misioneros de la Muerte (El Signo, Negro Navarro and El Texano) in a Lucha de Apuestas triple hair vs. triple hair match
September 19	WWC	WWC 13th Aniversario	Ponce, Puerto Rico	Tony Atlas vs. Hiroshi Wajima in a singles match (result unknown)
September 20	WWC	WWC 13th Aniversario	Mayagüez, Puerto Rico	Ric Flair (c) defeated Miguel Perez, Jr. in a singles match for the NWA Worlds Heavyweight Championship
October 12	WCCW	3rd Cotton Bowl Extravaganza	Dallas, Texas	Bruiser Brody defeated Abdullah the Butcher in a steel cage match with guest referee Fritz Von Erich
October 10	AJW	Tag League the Best	Tokyo, Japan	The Crush Gals defeated Dump Matsumoto & Bull Nakano in the finals
November 7	AJW	All Japan Women's at Osaka Jo Hall	Osaka, Japan	Chigusa Nagayo defeats Dump Matsumoto in a hair vs hair rematch.
November 15	WWF	Saturday Night's Main Event	Los Angeles, California	Hulk Hogan (c) defeated Hercules Hernandez in a singles match for the WWF World Heavyweight Championship
November 27	JCP	Starrcade '86: The Skywalkers	Greensboro, North Carolina; Atlanta, Georgia	Ric Flair (c) wrestled Nikita Koloff to a double disqualification in a singles match for the NWA World Heavyweight Championship
December 12	NJPW	World Tag League	Tokyo, Japan	Antonio Inoki & Seiji Sakaguchi defeated Kengo Kimura & Tatsumi Fujinami in the finals
December 14	WWF	Saturday Night's Main Event	Hartford, Connecticut	Hulk Hogan (c) defeated Paul Orndorff in a Steel cage match for the WWF World Heavyweight Championship
December 25	AWA	Brawl in St. Paul	St. Paul, Minnesota	The Midnight Rockers (Shawn Michaels & Marty Jannetty) defeated Buddy Rose & Doug Somers in a Steel Cage Match
(c) – denotes defending champion(s)

== Notable events ==
- Benjamin Mora Jr. creates the World Wrestling Association (WWA) based out of Tijuana, Baja California, Mexico.
- Wrestling Power magazine hit the newsstands with its first issue.
- Superstar Wrestler magazine hit the newsstands with its first issue.
- February 18 - World Class Championship Wrestling seceded from the National Wrestling Alliance
- March - Bill Watts renames his Mid South Wrestling territory the Universal Wrestling Federation
- August 30 - The final episodes of both WWF Championship Wrestling and WWF All Star Wrestling airs on syndication.
- September 6 and 7 - WWF debuted two new weekly shows WWF Superstars of Wrestling and WWF Wrestling Challenge on syndication replacing both WWF Championship Wrestling and WWF All Star Wrestling
- September - WCCW debuts on ESPN

== Tournaments and accomplishments ==
=== AJW ===
Accomplishment	Winner	Date won	Notes
Japan Grand Prix 1986	Yukari Omori	June 28	
Rookie of the Year Decision Tournament	Kiyo Toyoda		
Tag League the Best 1986	Chigusa Nagayo and Yumiko Hotta	October 10	

=== JCP ===
Accomplishment	Winner	Date won	Notes
Bunkhouse Stampede	Dusty Rhodes		
NWA World Television Championship Tournament	Arn Anderson	January 4	
Jim Crockett Sr. Memorial Cup Tag Team Tournament	Road Warriors (Hawk and Animal)	April 19	

=== WWF ===
Accomplishment	Winner	Date won	Notes
King of the Ring	Harley Race	July 14	
Sam Muchnick Memorial Tournament	Harley Race	August 29	

==== Slammy Awards ====
Poll	Winner
Best Personality in Land of a Thousand Dances	"Rowdy" Roddy Piper
Best Producer	Mona Flambe aka Cyndi Lauper
Best Commentator	Gene Okerlund
Most Ignominious	Nikolai Volkoff
Best Single Performer	Junkyard Dog

== Awards and honors ==
=== Pro Wrestling Illustrated ===
Category	Winner
PWI Wrestler of the Year	Ric Flair
PWI Tag Team of the Year	The Rock 'n' Roll Express (Ricky Morton and Robert Gibson)
PWI Match of the Year	Ric Flair vs. Dusty Rhodes (The Great American Bash)
PWI Feud of the Year	Hulk Hogan vs. Paul Orndorff
PWI Most Popular Wrestler of the Year	Roddy Piper
PWI Most Hated Wrestler of the Year	Paul Orndorff
PWI Most Improved Wrestler of the Year	Terry Gordy
PWI Most Inspirational Wrestler of the Year	Chris Adams
PWI Rookie of the Year	Lex Luger
PWI Lifetime Achievement	Verne Gagne
PWI Editor's Award	Lou Albano

=== Wrestling Observer Newsletter ===
Category	Winner
Wrestler of the Year	Ric Flair
Most Outstanding	Ric Flair
Feud of the Year	Hulk Hogan vs. Paul Orndorff
Tag Team of the Year	The Midnight Express (Dennis Condrey and Bobby Eaton)
Most Improved	Steve Williams
Best on Interviews	Jim Cornette

== Title changes ==
=== WWF ===
WWF World Heavyweight Championship
Incoming champion – Hulk Hogan
Date	Winner	Event/Show	Note(s)
No title changes

WWF Intercontinental Championship
Incoming champion – Tito Santana
Date	Winner	Event/Show	Note(s)
February 8	Randy Savage	House show	

WWF World Martial Arts Heavyweight Championship
Incoming champion – Antonio Inoki
Date	Winner	Event/Show	Note(s)
No title changes

WWF Canadian Championship
Incoming champion – Dino Bravo
Date	Winner	Event/Show	Note(s)
January 22	Vacant	N/A	

WWF Women's Tag Team Championship
Incoming champions – The Glamour Girls (Leilani Kai and Judy Martin)
Date	Winner	Event/Show	Note(s)
No title changes

WWF Women's Championship
Incoming champion – The Masked Spider Lady (Fabulous Moolah)
Date	Winner	Event/Show	Note(s)
July 3	Velvet McIntyre	Live event	
July 9	The Fabulous Moolah	Live event	

WWF Tag Team Championship
Incoming champions – The Dream Team (Brutus Beefcake and Greg Valentine)
Date	Winner	Event/Show	Note(s)
April 7	The British Bulldogs (The British Bulldog and Dynamite Kid)	WrestleMania 2	

== Births ==
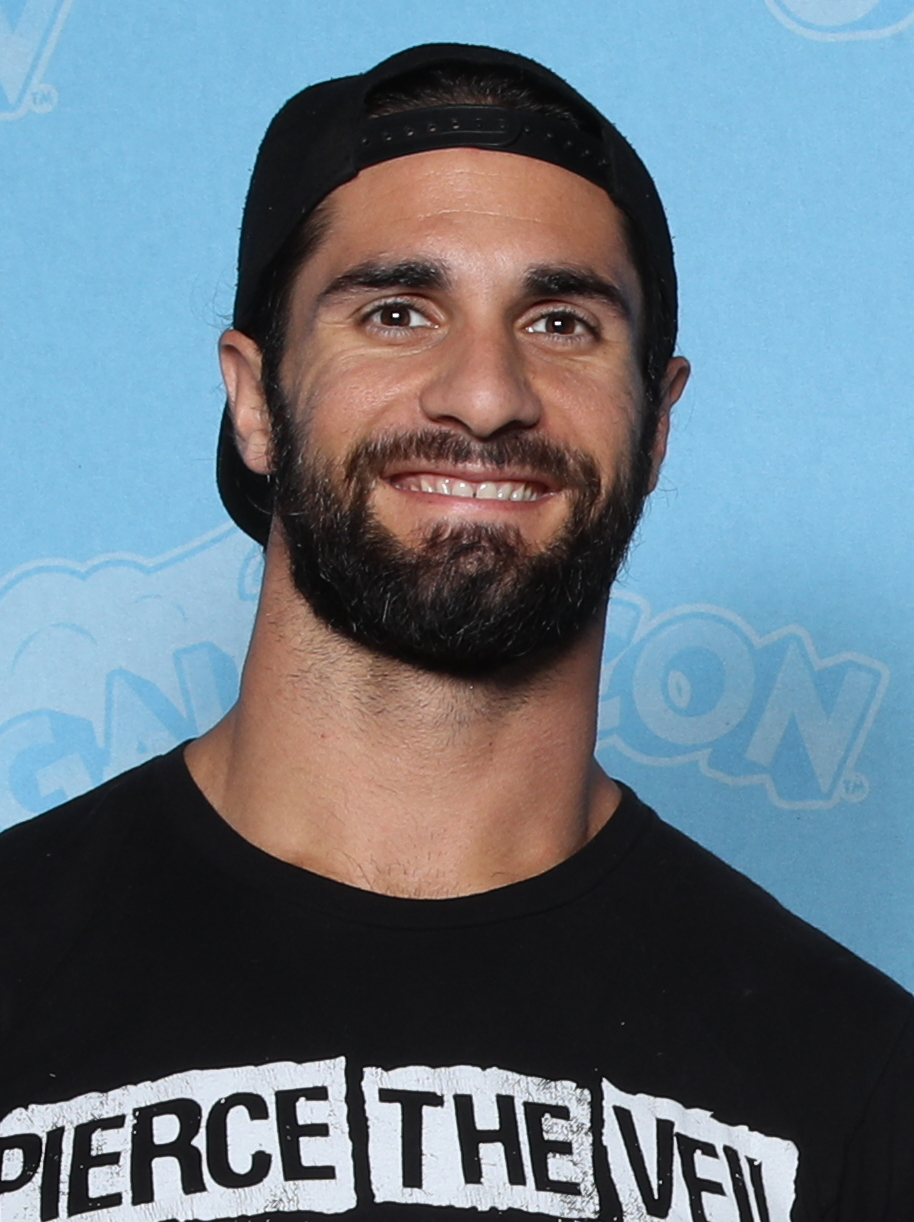
Seth Rollins

- January 7 – Melanie Cruise
- January 14 – Matt Riddle
- January 24 – Vinny Marseglia
- February 1 – Jaka (died in 2025)
- February 5 – Madison Rayne
- February 17 – Ricardo Rodriguez
- March 1:
  - Big E Langston
  - Kazumi Kikuta
- March 4 – Dalton Castle
- March 8 – Chad Gable
- March 16 – Kenny Dykstra
- March 27 – So Cal Val
- March 28 – Mustafa Ali
- April 5 – Charlotte Flair
- April 19 – Maxine
- April 22 – Chuck Taylor
- April 23 – Jessie Godderz
- May 19 – Danny Havoc (died in 2020)
- May 24 – Erina Yamanaka
- May 28 – Seth Rollins
- May 29 – Hornswoggle
- June 15 – Cezar Bononi
- June 20:
  - Shadia Bseiso
  - Jessicka Havok
- June 24 – Jessamyn Duke
- June 29
  - Serena
  - Súper Nova
- June 30 – Alicia Fox
- July 17:
  - Mojo Rawley
  - Lacey Von Erich
- July 19 – Jinder Mahal
- July 22 – Thunder Rosa
- August 6 – Reby Sky
- August 16 – Big Cass
- August 22 – Neville(died in 2026)
- September 2 – Unagi Sayaka
- September 4 – Xavier Woods
- September 7 – Colin Delaney
- September 22 – Lana Austin
- September 25 – Tyson Maeguchi
- October 5 – Joaquin Wilde
- October 7 – Kaitlyn
- October 12 – Gregory Iron
- October 15 - Paul Walter Hauser
- October 31 – Aki Shizuku
- November 5 – Alexander Wolfe
- November 6 – Nick Aldis
- November 13 – Act Yasukawa
- November 14 – Kalisto
- November 25 – Karsten Beck (died in 2020)
- December 3 – Wolfgang
- December 8 – Enzo Amore

== Debuts ==
Unknown date

- John Laurinaitis
- Norman Smiley
- Cody Michaels
- Brian Adams
- Doug Gilbert
- Joey Jackson (wrestler)
- Paul Heyman
- Scott Steiner
- The Warlord
- Charles Robinson
- Luna Vachon
- Mountain Fiji
- Babe the Farmer's Daughter
- Mark Starr
- Derrick Dukes
- Tough Tom (wrestler)
- Chuck Coates
- Wellington Wilkins Jr.

- February 16 - Kensuke Sasaki
- February 28 - Hiroshi Hase
- April 6 - Jeff Jarrett
- April 20 - Hisakatsu Oya
- May 24 - Akira Katayama
- May 30 - Owen Hart
- July 24 - El Samurai
- August 8 - KAORU and Megumi Kudo
- August 17 - Shinobu Kandori, Mayumi Ozaki, Dynamite Kansai, Harley Saito, Rumi Kazama, Plum Mariko, Yu Yamazaki (JWP), Dirty Yamato (JWP), Yuki Ito (JWP) and Maiko Tsurugi (JWP)
- September 5 - Eagle Sawai (JWP and LLPW) and Xóchitl Hamada
- September 7 - Reggie Bennett
- September 10 - Bison Kimura (All Japan Women's)
- September 16 - Aja Kong
- September 17 - Combat Toyoda
- September 19 - Cutie Suzuki
- September 22 - Oscar Tomo (JWP)
- September 25 - Reibun Amada (All Japan Women's), Mika Takahashi (All Japan Women's) and Miori Kamiya (All Japan Women's)
- October - Ron Simmons
- December 1 - Road Dogg (Made his debut for only one appearance at 17 before he went into the marines. He returned to wrestling in 1991.)

== Retirements ==
- Bobby Duncum Sr. (1967 - 1986)
- Don Kent (1956 - 1986)
- Dr. Wagner (July 16, 1961 - April 27, 1986)
- Dick the Bruiser (1954 - 1986)
- Ernie Ladd (1961 - 1986)
- Hubert Gallant (May 2, 1975 - 1986)
- Jacques Rougeau, Sr. (1956 - 1986)
- Kurt Von Hess (September 1968 - 1986)
- Lars Anderson (1965 - 1986)
- Mad Maxine (1984 - 1986)
- Mario Milano (1953 - 1986)
- Maurice Vachon (1950 - 1986)
- Pampero Firpo (1953 - 1986)
- Stu Hart (1943-July 25, 1986)
- Swede Hanson (1957 - 1986)
- Vivian St. John (August 6, 1974 - 1986)
- Vivian Vachon (1969 - 1986)
- Don Fargo (1952 - 1986)

== Deaths ==
- February 2 – Gino Hernandez, 28
- March 25 - Warren Bockwinkel, 74
- April 6 – El Solitario, 39
- April 13 - Jack van Bebber, 78
- April 26 – Ángel Blanco, 47
- July 3 - The Beast (John Yachetti), 58/59

== See also ==
- List of WCW pay-per-view events
- List of WWF pay-per-view events
