= Texas Hangmen =

Professional wrestling tag team

The Texas Hangmen was the name of a professional wrestling tag team formed in the 1980s. The team competed in the American Wrestling Association in the late 1980s, where they received their highest amount of exposure, but had more success in the World Wrestling Council where they held the company's world tag team championship multiple times.

== Formation ==
The Texas Hangmen consisted of wrestlers Frank Vizi, who had been wrestling as Rick Gantner in the AWA and World Wrestling Federation primarily as a jobber, and Mike Moran who had spent an extensive amount of time wrestling in Kansas City and the American Wrestling Association as Mike Richards. Both men were put under wrestling masks to hide their faces, and carried nooses to the ring to emphasize their characters as executioners. Vizi was given the name Psycho while Moran became Killer.

=== American Wrestling Association ===
Killer and Psycho wrestled in the AWA for several years, beginning in 1987, and contended for the AWA World Tag Team Championship but never won it.

They were also participants in the company's ill-fated Team Challenge Series that eventually resulted in the AWA's downfall.

=== World Wrestling Council ===
After the AWA folded, Vizi and Moran carried their Texas Hangmen characters with them to Puerto Rico.

On September 15, 1990, Killer and Psycho challenged the newly crowned WWC World Tag Team Champions, The Super Medicos, for the titles. The match ended controversially, with the titles being held up, and the champions regained the title over the Hangmen one week later. Killer and Psycho would return the favor one week later, winning their first championship together. They would hold the belts until February 3, 1991, dropping them to El Bronco and Invader I. The Hangmen won the rematch on February 10 and kept the belts for three more weeks, losing a Luchas de apuestas match on March 2 where El Bronco and Invader I put their mask and hair on the line against the tag team title belts.

== United States Wrestling Association ==
Shortly after their loss of their second WWC World Tag Team Championship, the Texas Hangmen went to the United States Wrestling Association in Memphis and defeated their tag team champions, Jeff Jarrett and Jerry Lawler, for the belts. They lost the belts to Jarrett and Robert Fuller in May 1991.

== Afterward ==
Both Vizi and Moran would move on to different companies. Vizi eventually became known as Bull Pain and have a successful singles career as an independent wrestler, first in the original Extreme Championship Wrestling and then in IWA Mid-South. He would also appear from time to time as an enhancement talent in World Championship Wrestling.

The team made one last run as WWC World Tag Team Champions in 1996, only to split during their reign as Vizi and promoter Carlos Colon fought over his salary and left.

== Disorderly Conduct ==
Moran is perhaps better known to modern wrestling fans as Mean Mike, one half of the team Disorderly Conduct in World Championship Wrestling. He teamed with Tom Beninghaus, who took the name Tough Tom, and the two served primarily as a tag team that primarily wrestled on the company's syndicated programming, WCW Thunder and WCW Saturday Night. On occasion, Benninghaus and Moran would don masks and wrestle as the Texas Hangmen with Benninghaus taking on the role as Strangler. They were soon known as the Texas Outlaws when they utilized that gimmick instead as the WCW Office felt that the word Hangmen had bad connotations.

== Championships and accomplishments ==
- Independent Association of Wrestling
  - IAW Tag Team Championship (4 times)
- United States Wrestling Association
  - USWA Tag Team Championship (1 time)
- Windy City Wrestling
  - WCPW Tag Team Championship (3 times)
- World Wrestling Council
  - WWC World Tag Team Championship (3 times)
