= Mean Mike =

American professional wrestler

Personal information
- Born: Michael Moran Milwaukee, Wisconsin, United States

Professional wrestling career
- Ring name(s): Grey Skull; Killer; Mean Mike; Mighty Kodiak; Mike Madigan; Mike Moran; Mike Richards; Texas Hangman #1; Texas Hangman Killer; Texas Outlaw #1
- Billed height: 6 ft 2 in (188 cm)
- Billed weight: 275 lb (125 kg)
- Trained by: Jake Milliman; Rocky Stone; Herman Schafer
- Debut: 1982
- Retired: 2013

Mike Moran is an American retired professional wrestler. He is best known for his appearances with World Championship Wrestling (WCW) under the ring name Mean Mike, teaming with "Tough Tom" as "Disorderly Conduct". He is also known for his appearances as Killer, one-half of the Texas Hangmen alongside Psycho.

== Professional wrestling career ==
=== Early career (1982–1997) ===
Mike started his career as Mike Madigan in 1982 and wrestled for several local independent companies. Eventually he garnered enough experience, and was booked as an enhancement talent as Mike Richards working for the World Wrestling Federation and American Wrestling Association on their TV shows AWA TV, WWF Wrestling Challenge and WWF Superstars. His first territory opportunity was in 1984 working for Bob Geigel in Central States Wrestling as Mike Madigan. After several years of working as an enhancement talent, Mike and fellow enhancement talent Rick Gantner aka Bull Pain took on the personas of The Texas Hangmen Killer & Psycho under masks and wrestled for Verne Gagne in the American Wrestling Association.

In the WWC they were managed by El Profe and won the WWC Caribbean Tag Team Championship from The Super Medicos as well as being a part of an infamous hanging of Invader I angle which made them one of the most memorable teams in WWC history. The next year they lost the WWC Tag Teams Titles and left for Tennessee to work for Jerry Jarrett in the United States Wrestling Association. There they were managed by J. C. Ice and won the USWA World Tag Team Championship from Jerry Lawler and Jeff Jarrett in Memphis. Later that year after losing the belts to Jarrett and Robert Fuller in May 1991, the team split up as Psycho no longer wanted to wear the mask and developed his new persona as Bull Pain. Bull sold his portion of the gear to Mike to continue the Texas Hangmen.

In 1996, Moran spent time in Big Japan Pro Wrestling as "Grey Skull", with Tom Beninghaus who was Tornado Juice working a lot of Barbed wire matches with most of Big Japan's top talent.

Moran took on two of his students he trained locally for the next two years as new versions of The Texas Hangmen, Midwest Indy wrestlers Rambo Robinson and Spymaster - before choosing his permanent Tag Team partner Tough Tom who was also wrestling locally in Wisconsin at the time. Moran and Beninghaus went back to Puerto Rico and won the WWC Caribbean Tag Team Championship again, this time managed by Rico Suave. They would also go on to see considerable success in Windy City Wrestling, winning their Tag Team Championships on 3 occasions.

Moran then decided to take off the mask and wrestled under the new persona as "The Mighty Kodiak" wearing a large Bear head into the ring. He primarily wrestled for Windy City Wrestling in the Midwest, working several matches against Bob Backlund, Ken Patera and Cowboy Bob Orton. Moran then returned to Puerto Rico as The Mighty Kodiak and won the WWC Television Championship from El Pulgarcito at Hiram Bithorn Stadium in San Juan. After losing the TV title to Sweet Brown Sugar aka Skip Young, he then went back to the US, donning the hoods again with Beninghaus as The Texas Hangmen.

=== World Championship Wrestling (1997–2001) ===
In 1997 Moran would team with Beninghaus as his partner and began working for World Championship Wrestling (WCW), in WCW he was renamed "Mean Mike" while his partner became "Tough Tom", collectively known as "Disorderly Conduct". On occasion, Moran and Beninghaus would continue to take on the guises of The Texas Hangmen, and later on known as The Texas Outlaws. The duo mainly worked to help other teams look good, especially younger talent, with the highlight of their time in WCW being an unsuccessful challenge for the WCW World Tag Team Championship, losing to champions The Steiner Brothers (Rick Steiner and Scott Steiner) on an episode of Monday Nitro, as well as Curt Hennig and Barry Windham for the WCW World Tag Team Championship on an episode of WCW Saturday Night in 1999. They also worked with Scott Armstrong and Steve Armstrong, The Armstrong Brothers extensively on WCW Saturday Night, and proved to be very solid hands for the company and the WCW Tag Team Division.

=== Late career (2001–2013) ===
After WCW folded, Mean Mike would work in Jimmy Hart's Xcitement Wrestling Federation in 2001 before working with Bubba The Love Sponge at a World Wrestling Federation House Show in Tampa, Florida in 2002. Mean Mike's final match would come in the form of a six man tag team match reuniting with Tough Tom and Bull Pain with all three of The Texas Hangmen for the only time ever, for Great Lakes Championship Wrestling in Waukesha, Wisconsin where they picked up the win in 2013. The Texas Hangmen would eventually be inducted into the Puerto Rican Wrestling Hall of Fame in 2018.

Today Mike lives in Clearwater, Florida, where he has lived for over 20 years and runs a successful Real Estate Appraisal Company.

== Championships and accomplishments ==
- Windy City Pro Wrestling
  - WCPW Tag Team Championship (3 times) – with Strangler
- World Wrestling Council
  - WWC World Tag Team Championship (4 times) - with Psycho (2 times), Strangler (1 time)
  - WWC Television Championship (1 time)
- United States Wrestling Association
  - USWA World Tag Team Championship (1 time) - with Psycho
