= Bseiso =

Bseiso (Arabic: بسيسو) (also translated as Beseiso, Bsaiso, Besaiso, Bsiso, Bseisu, Bseisu, Bseiso) is an Arab (Levantine) surname of Palestinian origins, dating back to the 18th century. They are one of the largest and most renowned Palestinian families in Palestine and are well known throughout the region. Originating from Aleppo centuries ago before borders then migrated and took refuge in Gaza in Palestine where they held the most prominent positions in government and society. They were also one of the largest land owners in Palestine. The family has many remarkable accomplishments in the society and the country in different fields mostly law and businesses. Today's descendants are scattered around the world, primarily in Palestine, Jordan, Kuwait. The Bseiso family's roots come from the Kayyali Family (عائلة الكيالي), and the forefather who was first nicknamed "Bseiso" was Ahmed Al-Kayyali (أحمد الكيالي بسيسو).

== Notable Bseiso individuals ==
- Mu'in Tawfiq Bseiso, poet and educator
- Musallam Wajih Bseiso, intellectual, journalist, and politician
- Shadia Bseiso, Jordanian TV presenter, jiu-jitsu practitioner and professional wrestler. In October 2017, she became the first Arab female wrestler from the Middle East to sign a contract with WWE, the world's largest wrestling promotion company.
