= Tough Tom (wrestler) =

American professional wrestler

Personal information
- Born: Tom Beninghaus Sheboygan, Wisconsin, United States

Professional wrestling career
- Ring name(s): Strangler; Tough Tom; Texas Hangman #2; Tornado Juice; Tom Bennett; Blackjack Bennett; Texas Hangman Strangler; Texas Outlaw #2; Tuff Tom
- Billed height: 6 ft 0 in (183 cm)
- Billed weight: 279 lb (127 kg)
- Debut: 1986
- Retired: 2013

Tom Beninghaus is an American retired professional wrestler. He is best known for his appearances with World Championship Wrestling (WCW) under the ring name Tough Tom, teaming with "Mean Mike" as "Disorderly Conduct". He is also known for his appearances as Strangler, one-half of the Texas Hangmen.

== Professional wrestling career ==
=== Early career (1986–1997) ===
Tom started his career in 1986 as Jesse James working in Midwest independent promotions. Eventually he garnered enough experience, and was booked as an enhancement talent as Tom Bennett working for the World Wrestling Federation and American Wrestling Association on their TV shows AWA TV, WWF Wrestling Challenge and WWF Superstars.

In 1996, Tom Beninghaus who spent time in Big Japan Pro Wrestling as "Tornado Juice", with Mike Moran as who was Grey Skull working a lot of Barbed wire matches with most of Big Japan's top talent.

Moran and Beninghaus went to Puerto Rico and won the WWC Caribbean Tag Team Championship again, this time managed by Rico Suave. They would also go on to see considerable success in Windy City Wrestling, winning their Tag Team Championships on 3 occasions.

=== World Championship Wrestling (1997–2001) ===
Beninghaus is perhaps better known to modern wrestling fans as Tough Tom, one-half of the team Disorderly Conduct in World Championship Wrestling. He teamed with Mike Moran, who took the name Mean Mike, and the two served primarily as a tag team that primarily wrestled on the company's syndicated programming, WCW Thunder and WCW Saturday Night. On occasion, Benninghaus and Moran would don masks and wrestle as the Texas Hangmen with Benninghaus taking on the role as Strangler. They were soon known as the Texas Outlaws when they utilized that gimmick instead, as the WCW Office felt that the word Hangmen had bad connotations. On occasion, Moran and Beninghaus would continue to take on the guises of The Texas Hangmen, and later on known as The Texas Outlaws. The duo mainly worked to help other teams look good, especially younger talent, with the highlight of their time in WCW being an unsuccessful challenge for the WCW World Tag Team Championship, losing to champions The Steiner Brothers (Rick Steiner and Scott Steiner) on an episode of Monday Nitro, as well as Curt Hennig and Barry Windham for the WCW World Tag Team Championship on an episode of WCW Saturday Night in 1999. They also worked with Scott Armstrong and Steve Armstrong, The Armstrong Brothers extensively on WCW Saturday Night, and proved to be very solid hands for the company and the WCW Tag Team Division.

=== Late career (2001–2013) ===
After WCW folded, Tough Tom would work in Jimmy Hart's Xcitement Wrestling Federation in 2001. He would work in the independents until retiring from wrestling in 2007. In 2011, Tom and Mean Mike would reunite and lose to Demolition (Ax and Smash) at a wrestling event in Wisconsin. Tough Tom's final match would come in the form of a six man tag team match reuniting with Mean Mike and Bull Pain with all three of The Texas Hangmen for the only time ever, for Great Lakes Championship Wrestling in Waukesha, Wisconsin where they picked up the win in 2013.

== Championships and accomplishments ==
- Windy City Pro Wrestling
  - WCPW Tag Team Championship (3 times) – with Strangler
- World Wrestling Council
  - WWC World Tag Team Championship (3 times) - with Killer (3)
