= WWC Dominican Republic Heavyweight Championship =

Short-lived title in the World Wrestling Council

Details
- Promotion: World Wrestling Council; Dominican Wrestling Federation
- Date established: 1975
- Date retired: 2001?
Statistics
- First champion: Jack Veneno
- Final champion: El Bronco I
- Most reigns: Jack Veneno (6 reigns)

The WWC Dominican Republic Heavyweight Championship is a title debuted in World Wrestling Council and Dominican Wrestling Federation on 1975 and became inactive on 2001.

== Title history ==
Wrestler:	Reigns:	Date:	Place:	Notes:
Jack Veneno	1	1975		
Jack Veneno	2	1975		
Jack Veneno	3	1975		
Jack Veneno	4	1975		
Jack Veneno	5	1975		
Relámpago Hernández	1	April 18, 1981<		
Jack Veneno	6	August 1982<		
El Buitre	1	Unknown date		
Maravilla	1	May 1987		
El Bronco I	1	January 5, 1992	San Juan, Puerto Rico	Defeat Fidel Sierra.
Astroman	1	September 8, 2001<		
El Bronco I	2	September 22, 2001	Caguas, Puerto Rico	
Title inactive later on 2001.
