= Musallam Bseiso =

- Born: 10 January 1926; Bisan, Mandatory Palestine
- Died: 26 October 2017 (aged 91); Amman, Jordan
- Occupations: Journalist and politician

Musallam Wajih Bseiso (Arabic: مسلم بسيسو; 10 January 1926 – 26 October 2017) was a Palestinian journalist and politician.

== Biography ==
Musallam Bseiso was born in Bisan, Mandatory Palestine. He attended school in Beersheba and Gaza, graduating from The Bishop Gobat School in Jerusalem. He worked and participated in the creation of Jordanian and Arab newspapers. At an early age, he was writing for the Haifa and Jerusalem newspapers. Additionally, he was a correspondent stationed in Gaza for a number of newspapers in the 1940s, including the Associated Press (1948), the Egyptian "Al-Ahram", and the Jordanian "Al-Nasr". In 1951, he founded his own weekly newspaper, Al-Hawadeth (Arabic: الحوادث), in Jordan. Two years later, in 1952, Musallam Bseiso was elected as secretary of the Jordanian Press Syndicate. Bseiso remained actively involved in issues pertaining to the liberation of Palestine until his death in October 2017 at the age of 91.

In 1945, he worked as a writer and correspondent in the city of Gaza for the following daily and weekly newspapers: "al-Sha’ab" Daily, Jaffa "Nida’ al-Ard" Weekly, Jaffa "Sawt al-Sha’ab" Weekly, Bethlehem "al-wihda" Daily, Jerusalem "al-sawadi" Weekly, Cairo

In 1948, he worked as a war correspondent in the Jordanian, Iraqi and Egyptian fronts after the cessation of hostilities under an armistice on May 15, 1948. Bseiso attended meetings that followed the truce (between the Israelis and representatives of the Jordanian and Egyptian armies), in his capacity as an assistant war correspondent to the journalist John Roderick (of the Associated Press). He then worked as a reporter at the HQ of the Arab News Agency (Reuter) in Cairo, Egypt.

While working in Palestine in 1948, Bseiso delivered (broadcast/announce/cover) the news about the assassination of Count Folke Bernadotte (the United Nations Security Council’s mediator in the Arab-Israeli conflict of 1947-1948), who was assassinated in Jerusalem by the Israeli extremist group Lehi), while pursuing his official duties and meeting with the Israeli side, after he had already met with the Jordanian side. That same year, Bseiso had also worked for 2 months with the Arab News Agency (Reuter) in Cairo, and happened to be the first journalist to enter the Interior Ministry’s building in Cairo 1 hour after the assassination of the Prime Minister of Egypt at the time, Mahmoud Fahmi an-Nuqrashi. Bseiso saw an-Nuqrashi’s dead body in front of the elevator at the ministry, and also saw the assassin (a student from the faculty of veterinary medicine at the University of Fouad I).

In 1949, when the first military coup in the Arab region took place (led by Husni al-Za’im), Bseiso went to Damascus, Syria, for just one week, and realized through his contacts with some journalist friends that the coup had been covered and planned by "Tapline Petroleum" company and that Husni al-Za’im was chosen to lead the takeover. Bseiso then returned to Amman to work at the "al-‘Urdun" newspaper, (which was owned by the late Khalil Nasr, Abu Anis), working with other journalists.

In 1951, Bseiso started a weekly newspaper called "al-Hawadeth" in Jorda. The newspaper was published up until 1954, when its production was stopped, and disrupted by several successive governments in Jordan – namely, the governments of the late Tawfiq Abu al-Huda and the late Fawzi al-Mulqi. The newspaper was opposed to the government’s policies. Moreover, the newspaper was against the government’s appeasement of British policy and orders, which paved the way for the establishment of the Israeli entity.

In 1953, Bseiso was instrumental in calling for the foundation of several labor unions, which the government agreed to establish, in collaboration with others. He was also behind the government’s issuance of the Jordan Press Association Law No. 7 1953, which was published in the Official Newspaper No. 1131 dated January 17, 1953. Bseiso was one of the members of the tripartite committee, which had invited owners and editors of newspapers to the first meeting of journalists, where the first Association Council (below) was elected on March 17, 1953, in the offices of "al-Jazeera" newspaper in Amman. The first Association Council received a congratulatory telegram from the Secretary-General of the Egyptian Press Syndicate Mustafa al-Qashashi. The telegram also included an invitation to attend the Arab Journalism Conference in Cairo, during which the creation of the Arab Journalists Union was announced, and which was held under the patronage of Major General Muhammad Najeeb, and in the presence of Gamal Abdel Nasser, Hussein el-Shafei, Kamal el-Din Hussein, Khaled Mohi El Din and Salah Salem – members of the Revolutionary Command Council (RCC).

In 1956, Bseiso worked at the Syrian radio, preparing the news in English. He also was the Managing Editor at the "al-Ayyam" daily newspaper in Damascus. After the Arabization of the Jordanian army and the decommissioning of Lieutenant-General Sir John Bagot Glubb, better known as Glubb Pasha (who was commander of Transjordan’s Arab Legion), Bseiso returned to Amman and joined the Middle East News Agency’s office in Amman, as a Managing Editor. In 1957, Bseiso returned to Damascus after Suleiman Nabulsi’s government in Jordan was dismissed, and he joined the Middle East News Agency’s office in Damascus, as a Managing Editor. He also worked as the Managing Editor of the "al-Tali’a" daily newspaper until 1958. After the coup on the Syrian-Egyptian union, Syrian newspapers resumed publication, and Bseiso worked as the Managing Editor of "al-Sada" daily newspaper, which changed back to its old name "al-Rai al-Aam".

Between 1968-1979, Bseiso worked as a General Director of the Jordanian Paper and Cardboard Factories Company. He helped establish the Arab Union of the paper and printing industries, and he was elected as Vice-President of the Union.

After the Camp David Accords, and the relocation of the Union’s headquarters to Baghdad, Bseiso was elected as Secretary-General of the Union, until 1982.
