= Harley Race =

American professional wrestler, promoter and trainer (1943–2019)

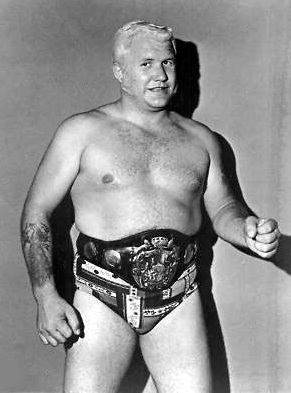
- Race as the NWA World Heavyweight Champion in 1973

Personal information
- Born: Harley Leland Race; April 11, 1943 Quitman, Missouri, U.S.
- Died: August 1, 2019 (aged 76) St. Charles, Missouri, U.S.
- Cause of death: Lung cancer
- Spouses: Vivian Jones (m. 1960; died 1960); Sandra Jones (m. 1960; div. 1961); Evon Race (m. 1962; div. 1993); Beverly Race (m. 1995; died 2009)
- Children: 2

Professional wrestling career
- Ring name(s): The Great Mortimer; Harley Race; Jack Long; The King; Handsome Harley Race; King Harley Race
- Billed height: 6 ft 1 in (185 cm)
- Billed weight: 253 lb (115 kg)
- Billed from: Kansas City, Missouri
- Trained by: Buddy Austin; Ray Hrstich; Stanislaus Zbyszko; Władek Zbyszko
- Debut: 1959
- Retired: December 1990

Harley Leland Race (April 11, 1943 – August 1, 2019) was an American professional wrestler, professional wrestling promoter, and trainer.

Race wrestled in the National Wrestling Alliance (NWA), the American Wrestling Association (AWA), the World Wrestling Federation (WWF, now WWE), and World Championship Wrestling (WCW). He was an eight-time world champion, having won the NWA World Heavyweight Championship eight times, and was the first NWA United States Heavyweight Champion.

Race is one of six men to have been inducted into each of the WWE Hall of Fame, the NWA Hall of Fame, the WCW Hall of Fame, the Professional Wrestling Hall of Fame, and the Wrestling Observer Newsletter Hall of Fame.

== Early life ==
Race was born in Quitman, Missouri, on April 11, 1943. Race was an early fan of professional wrestling, watching programming from the nearby Chicago territory on the DuMont Television Network. After overcoming polio as a child, he began training as a professional wrestler as a teen under former world champions Stanislaus and Władek Zbyszko, who operated a farm in his native Missouri. While in high school, an altercation with a classmate led to the principal kneeing Race in the back of the head as he tried to break up the fight. Enraged, Race attacked him, resulting in his expulsion. Already 6 ft 1 in (1.85 m) and 225 lb (102 kg), Race decided to get his start in professional wrestling. Race then became the driver of Happy Humphrey who was too large to drive at the time.

== Professional wrestling career ==
=== Early career (1959–1965) ===
Race was recruited by St. Joseph wrestling promoter Gust Karras who hired Race to do odd jobs for his promotion, including chauffeuring the 800 lb (360 kg) Happy Humphrey. Eventually, Race started wrestling on some of his shows and some of Karras' veteran wrestlers helped further Race's training. At the age of 18, he moved to Nashville and began wrestling under the ring name of Jack Long, forming a tag team with storyline brother John Long (regional journeyman Billy Strong). The duo quickly captured the Southern Tag Team Championship. Race was seen as a rising star in the business until a car accident put him out of action, with his leg nearly being amputated. His pregnant wife, Vivian Louise Jones, died instantly; they had been married just over a month. Karras heard about his employee's condition, went rushing into the hospital, and blocked the planned amputation, declaring it "over my dead body". In doing so, he saved Race's leg. Although he recovered, doctors told Race that he might never walk again, and his wrestling career was over. Undaunted, Race endured grueling physical therapy for several months and made a full recovery. Race next went on to work for Jack Pfefer and Tony Santos in the Boston territory as the Great Mortimer in 1963.

He returned to the ring in 1964, wrestling for Dory Funk's Amarillo, Texas-based territory, the Western States promotion. This time, he wrestled as Harley Race, after his father told him that he should not work to make anyone else's name famous. Race never again used a different ring name. In Amarillo, Race met fellow up-and-coming wrestler Larry Hennig (later Larry "the Axe" Hennig and father of "Mr. Perfect" Curt Hennig). The two formed a tag team and moved to the American Wrestling Association (AWA).

=== American Wrestling Association (1963–1971, 1976, 1984–1986, 1990) ===
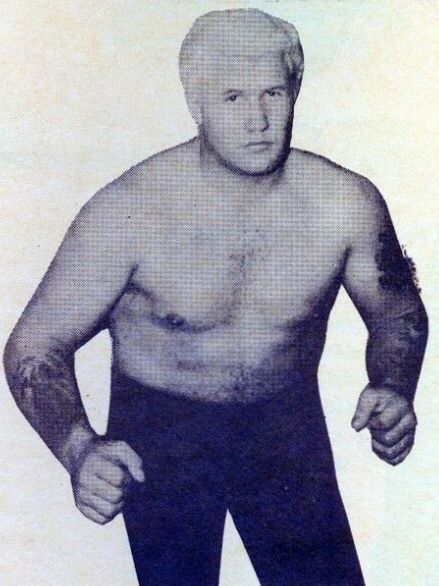
"Handsome" Harley Race

In the AWA, Race and Hennig branded themselves as "Handsome" Harley Race (which was actually a moniker given to him by fans in Japan) and "Pretty Boy" Larry Hennig, portraying a cocky heel (villain) tag team with a penchant for breaking the rules to win matches. They quickly became top contenders, and in January 1965, they defeated Dick the Bruiser and the Crusher in the sold-out Minneapolis Auditorium to win the AWA World Tag Team Championship. Clips from the match aired on WCCO TV.

Two weeks after winning the titles, Race was involved in an altercation at The Chestnut Tree, a restaurant in Minneapolis, Minnesota. After Race confronted a man who was harassing a woman in the restaurant, knocking him unconscious, the man's friend, John Morton, stabbed Race in the back. Race was hospitalized and Morton was arrested.

Race and Hennig were designated to feud with the Bruiser and Crusher and other top teams for the next several years, and were given three title reigns. Verne Gagne, in particular, was promoted as a hated rival of the team, partnering with several other wrestlers in matches, against Race and Hennig during their AWA run. In October 1967, Gagne was credited with "breaking" one of Hennig's legs, thus giving him some much needed time off from the ring. Race (as the storyline went) was allowed to choose a new partner and retain the AWA World Tag Team Championship. Race's choice was Chris Markoff, but the duo was defeated in their first title defense match against the team of Pat O'Connor and Wilbur Snyder in November 1967. For the next several months, Race teamed with Hard Boiled Haggerty (Don Stansauk) who over the years presented Gagne with some of his greatest matches. Together, Race and Haggerty often were cast against Gagne and "Cowboy" Bill Watts. In March 1968, after Hennig's return to the ring, he and Race were back together, though the two never again won the AWA World Tag Team Championship. Despite his tag team success, Race left the AWA in 1971 after several years at the top of the division to pursue a singles career in the National Wrestling Alliance (NWA).

Made a one-night return to the AWA in 1976 when he had a draw against Bob Backlund.

Race returned to the AWA in 1984 to wrestle Curt Hennig. The confrontation was fueled by Larry Hennig confronting his former tag team partner at the end of the match. Race also wrestled former AWA World Heavyweight Champion Rick Martel as part of WrestleRock in April 1986.

Toward the end of his in-ring career, he returned to the AWA, most notably cast against Larry Zbyszko for an AWA World Heavyweight Championship match in August 1990, which was featured as the main event of an AWA broadcast on ESPN making it the final AWA television taping. The match ended in a double countout. AWA folded after the match.

=== National Wrestling Alliance (1962–1986) ===
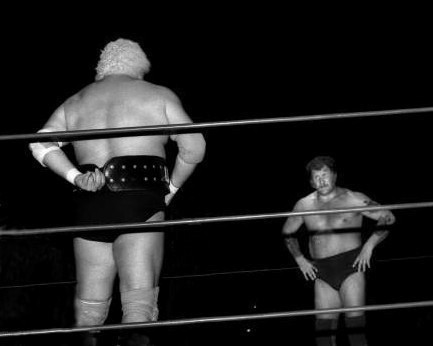
Dusty Rhodes prepares to face Race (in the background) in 1979.

Race jumped between National Wrestling Alliance territories in the early 1970s, renewing his rivalry with Funk in Amarillo, Texas and winning a regional title. He was seen as a gifted territorial wrestler, not quite ready for the worldwide spotlight, until 1973. In Kansas City, he did very well teaming with Roger "Nature Boy" Kirby. As a singles wrestler, he held the NWA Missouri Heavyweight Championship as well as the Mid-Atlantic version of the NWA United States Heavyweight Championship. He also started what would be many tours to Japan in All Japan Pro Wrestling where he faced Giant Baba. He worked with All Japan from 1973 to 1989. He frequently wrestled for the Kansas City-based Central States Wrestling.

In 1973, Race took the nickname "Mad Dog" and faced NWA World Heavyweight Champion Dory Funk Jr. in Kansas City. Race emerged from the battle as the new world champion in what was perceived by fans as a stunning upset. Behind the scenes, Funk had pulled out of losing the title to Jack Brisco, citing injuries in a truck accident; in truth, Amarillo promoter Dory Funk Sr. did not want his son losing the title to a fellow babyface (a fan favorite). Race, a known tough street fighter, was under orders from the NWA not to let Funk leave the ring as champion that night. The ending was a "work" with Funk dropping the title in a third fall as planned and TV announcer Bill Kersten dropping the "Mad Dog" nickname during the match.

A televised title defense from this first reign, held in Calgary against Klondike Bill, aired as the main event on an episode of the promotion's eponymous Stampede Wrestling program (where Race successfully defended his title), resurfaced during the 21st century as part of the WWE Video Library. Most of his televised matches of this era were squash matches held in television studios. Though Race held the title for only a few months, losing it to Brisco in Houston, Texas, in July, he became a worldwide superstar and perennial championship contender.

Race was determined to eventually regain the NWA World Heavyweight Championship, often moving between territories and collecting several regional titles, including eight Central States Heavyweight Championships, seven Missouri Heavyweight Championships, the Georgia Heavyweight Championship, the Stampede North American Heavyweight Championship in Canada, the Japan-based NWA United National Heavyweight and PWF World Heavyweight Championships, and becoming the first holder of the Mid-Atlantic United States Heavyweight Championship, still defended today as the WWE United States Championship. This kept Race in contention for the NWA World Heavyweight Championship, and Race vowed that he would only need one chance against the champion to regain it.

Race finally got his wish in 1977, facing familiar rival Terry Funk, who had become the champion since their previous encounters, in Toronto. Race won the title by submission with the Indian death lock, a rarely used submission move but one that put great pressure on Funk's injured leg. The NWA World Heavyweight Champion once again, Race this time established his dominance, defending the title up to six times a week and holding it for almost five years (excluding extremely short reigns by Tommy Rich, Dusty Rhodes, and Giant Baba). Race feuded with many of the legends of the NWA including Dory Funk, Dusty Rhodes, Dick the Bruiser, Pat Patterson and Angelo Poffo. In 1978, he had a series of violent matches throughout the Midwest with the Sheik, culminating in a bloody "2x4 with a nail in it" match in front of 12,313 at Cobo Hall. The NWA, AWA and WWF were on good terms, and Race engaged in title versus title matches with WWF Heavyweight champions Superstar Billy Graham and Bob Backlund, as well as AWA World Heavyweight Champion Nick Bockwinkel. Race toured extensively all over the country and the world, including Australia, New Zealand, Singapore and many stints in Japan, where he was already well known from his visits with Larry Hennig. On October 13, 1978, Race body slammed André the Giant. Race would repeat the feat on January 7, 1979, though it was outside the ring during the match.

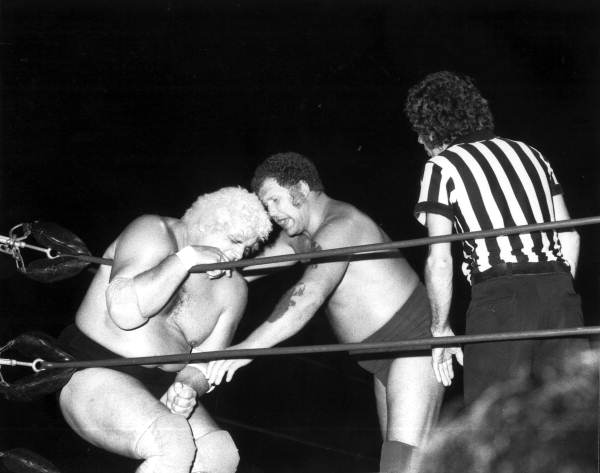
Race battles longtime rival Dusty Rhodes.

Race, after many victories over Dusty Rhodes and other great wrestlers, lost the title to Rhodes in 1981. Rhodes lost the title to up-and-coming star Ric Flair, though Race was able to defeat Flair in St. Louis in 1983 for his seventh reign as champion, which the NWA recognised as breaking the record previously held by Lou Thesz. What followed was one of the classic angles of the 1980s, which led to the Starrcade '83: A Flare for the Gold supershow.

Determined not to lose the title again, Race offered a $25,000 bounty to anyone who could eliminate Flair from the NWA. Bob Orton Jr. and Dick Slater attacked Flair, inflicting what appeared to be a career-ending neck injury, and collecting the bounty from Race after Flair announced his retirement. Flair's retirement was a ruse, however, and he eventually returned to action, much to Race's surprise. NWA officials set up a championship rematch, to be titled "Starrcade: A Flare for the Gold". The match was to be held in Flair's hometown of Greensboro, North Carolina, which enraged Race.

Shortly before the event, rival WWF promotor Vince McMahon offered Race $250,000 to no-show the event. After considering the offer to sabotage the event, Race declined and the match went ahead. Race lost the title to Flair in the bloody and memorable Starcade steel cage match (with Gene Kiniski as the special referee.) Flair jumped on top of Race from the top rope and pinned him to become champion.

Race regained the NWA World Heavyweight Championship for a two-day reign in New Zealand in 1984; after many years, it is now a recognized title change with Harley as an eight-time NWA World Heavyweight Champion. However, his loss to Flair at Starcade was largely seen as the torch-passing from Race to Flair. Flair would go on to credit Race for igniting his career. Later, Race left the NWA because NWA president Sam Muchnick was "losing his capabilities".

=== World Wrestling Federation (1986–1989) ===
In May 1986, Race entered the WWF managed by longtime friend Bobby "the Brain" Heenan, bleaching his hair blond and billing himself again as "Handsome" Harley Race. He made his debut on May 31, 1986, at Superstars of Wrestling taping in Toronto, Canada, defeating SD Jones. Race was undefeated that summer in competition against George Wells, Lanny Poffo, Tony Garea, Cousin Luke, and Tony Atlas.

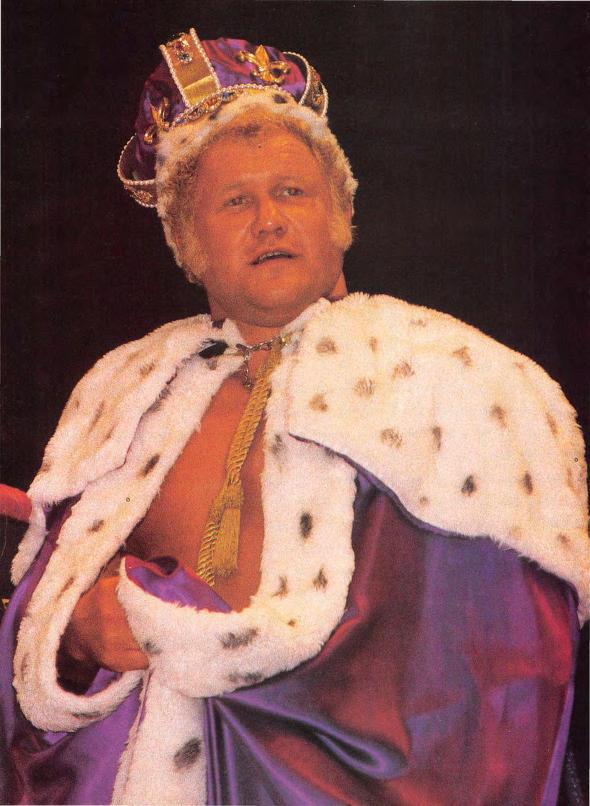
"King" Harley Race, circa 1987

During a time when the WWF did not recognize the existence of other promotions and the accomplishments a wrestler made there, WWF officials came up with a solution to recognize his wrestling pedigree by having him win the King of the Ring tournament on July 14, 1986. After this Race had a "coronation ceremony", as he then had referred to himself as "King" Harley Race, coming to the ring in a royal crown and cape, to the ceremonial accompaniment of the tenth movement (known as "Great Gate of Kiev") of Pictures at an Exhibition by Modest Mussorgsky. After winning a match, Race would make his defeated opponent "bow and kneel" before him. Usually Heenan would assist the defeated opponent to "bow and kneel" by grabbing their hair and forcing them to bow before Race.

He participated in a notable feud with the Junkyard Dog, culminating in a match at WrestleMania III at the Pontiac Silverdome, in which Race cleanly pinned JYD after a belly-to-belly suplex. JYD was required to bow to Race as the winner, but after he bowed and Race got up, JYD attacked Race before leaving with The King's cape to a standing ovation. Race would spend 1987 feuding with Hulk Hogan and Jim Duggan, who during a televised confrontation took Race's crown and robe, though Race later attacked Duggan and took them back. His feud with Duggan was highlighted by an extended brawl at the 1987 Slammy Awards. In early 1988, he suffered an abdominal injury in a match against Hogan in which he tried to hit Hogan, prone on a table at ringside, with a swan dive headbutt. Hogan moved out of the way and Race impacted the table inwards. The metal edge forced its way up into Race's abdomen giving him a hernia. Race continued to work with the injury through WrestleMania IV on March 27, 1988, where he participated in the event's battle royal.

Following this incident and during his recovery, the WWF ran an angle where they acknowledged his injury, and his manager Heenan vowed to crown a new king. Race was absent for six months, finally returning on October 15 to defeat B. Brian Blair in Milan, Italy. He rejoined The Heenan Family, participating with Bobby Heenan's team at Survivor Series. On December 3, 1988, on WWF Superstars he defeated Jim Gorman; after the match Race declared that he desired to regain the crown from Haku and complained that Bobby Heenan never visited him in the hospital. On December 17, 1988, at Philadelphia he defeated Danny Davis. After the victory he got onto the microphone and challenged Heenan to bring out Haku to face him. As the month drew to a close Race began to face King Haku on the house show circuit.

Despite Race's anger at his manager, Bobby Heenan came to the Royal Rumble match and cheered both Haku and the former king. Haku was victorious, and Harley Race departed from the WWF.

=== Post-WWF endeavors (1989–1990) ===
After leaving the WWF, Race continued to wrestle until the spring of 1991, most notably with World Wrestling Council (WWC) in Puerto Rico, Stampede Wrestling in Calgary, Alberta, the NWA, All Japan and the AWA. He defeated Miguel Perez Jr. for the WWC Caribbean Heavyweight Championship on January 6, 1990, in Puerto Rico making it his last title reign until dropping it to José González on March 4. After his appearance in AWA he briefly retired from wrestling.

=== World Championship Wrestling (1990–1995, 1999) ===
Race made his return to the promotion at The Great American Bash on July 7, 1990, when he defeated former NWA World Heavyweight Champion Tommy Rich. He began making appearances on house shows and immediately would fill in for Ric Flair in several tag team matches, pairing up with Barry Windham against Lex Luger and Sting. Race would continue a program with Rich through the rest of the summer, as well as facing Brian Pillman and Wendell Cooley. In September, he received several United States Heavyweight Championship title shots against then champion Lex Luger. In October, Race renewed his rivalry with the Junkyard Dog in two matches on the WCW house show circuit and finished the year facing Michael Wallstreet. During a house show match in St. Joseph, Missouri, on December 7, 1990, Race sustained a shoulder injury and would ultimately retire from active competition.

Race made his first subsequent appearance six months later as a guest referee during a house show on June 14, 1991, in St. Louis, Missouri. One year after making his initial return on The Great American Bash in 1990, Race returned at the 1991 The Great American Bash to become the adviser/manager to Luger. Excelling as a manager as he had as a wrestler, he immediately led Luger to the WCW World Heavyweight Championship. He managed Luger throughout his title run, as well as acquiring the contract for Mr. Hughes from Alexandra York.

In 1992, Race began to add other wrestlers to a stable that would include Big Van Vader, Super Invader, and Vinnie Vegas. The stable was short-lived, and after Vader defeated Sting for the world championship on July 12, 1992, he became Race's primary charge. During his management of Vader, Race met with racial controversy when Vader was feuding with WCW wrestler Ron Simmons when saying during a promo, "When I was world champion, I had a boy like you to carry my bags!". This was actually part of the booking strategy of then-WCW head Bill Watts to build support for Simmons, whom he eventually made champion. The wily veteran was popular among the young WCW talent, and developed close friendships with Mick Foley and Steve Austin, among others. On June 9, 1993, at a TV taping in Lake Charles, Louisiana, Race began managing The Colossal Kongs, and on July 7 at the WorldWide tapings in Orlando, Florida, Yoshi Kwan joined the stable.

Race returned to the ring a final time on a trio of Florida house shows (November 26, 1993, in Davie, Florida, November 27 in Orlando, Florida, and November 28 in Jacksonville, Florida), when he substituted for an injured Vader to face Flair. His former rival would come out victorious on each occasion. These would be the last wrestling matches of his career.

After losing the title at Starrcade '93: 10th Anniversary in December 1993, Vader quickly became Race's sole stable member again. Race continued to manage Vader in the following months in rematches against Flair, and on May 22, 1994, he was inducted into the WCW Hall of Fame during the Slamboree '93: A Legends' Reunion pay-per-view. He continued to appear at Vader's side through the rest of the year.

As his early wrestling career had been nearly derailed due to a car accident, another car accident in January 1995 forced Race out of the wrestling business altogether. Race required hip replacement surgery, which, along with injuries accumulated after years in the ring, prevented him from even being a manager. Race would make a few independent appearances against Flair, but his inability to work was just too great. Race would make one last return to WCW television in October 1999 as the ring announcer for the Bret Hart vs. Chris Benoit tribute to Owen Hart match in his hometown of Kansas City.

=== Later career (2004–2019) ===
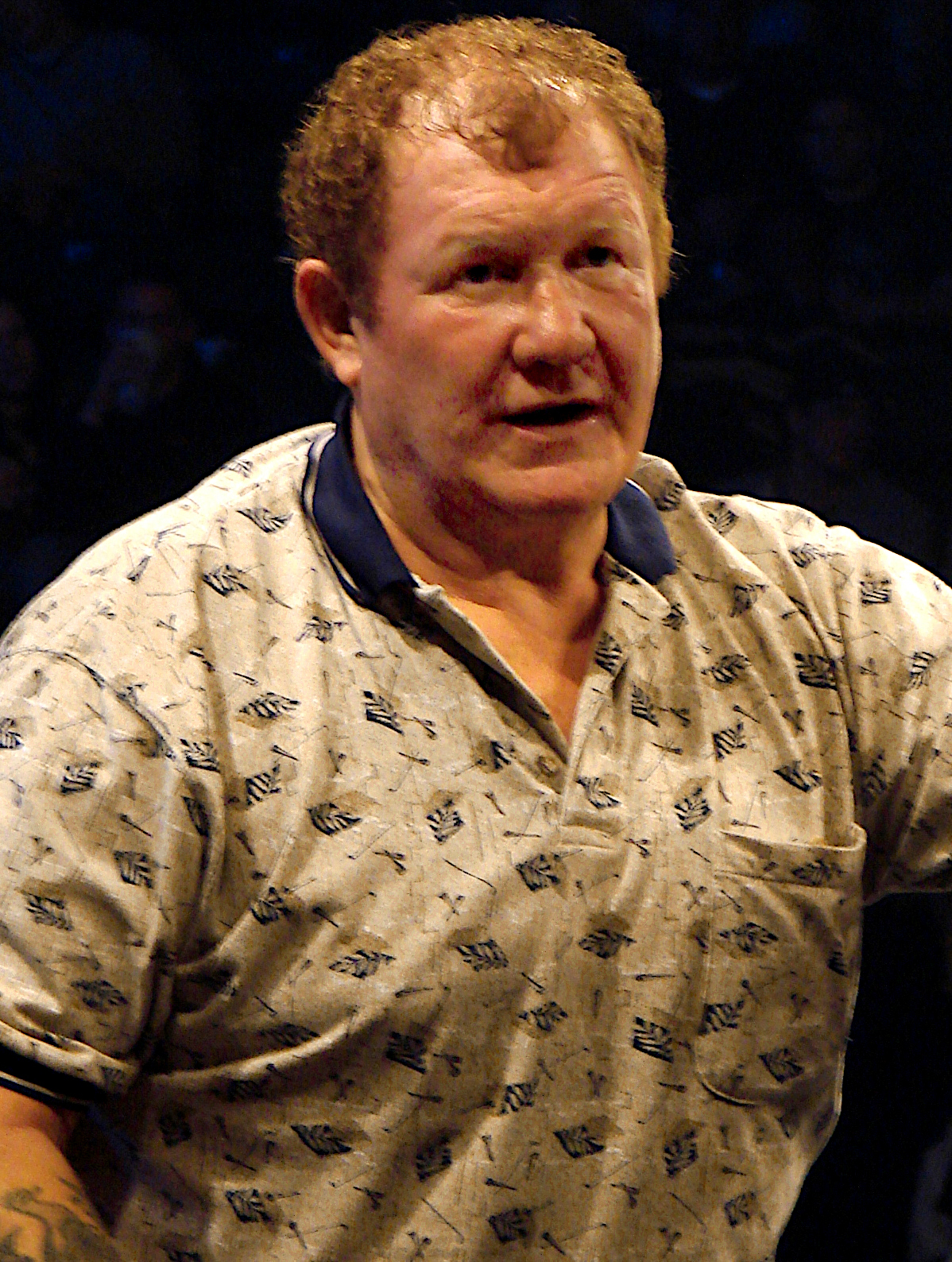
Race in 2007

Race returned to WWE television in 2004 shortly after being inducted into their Hall of Fame. On an episode of Raw, Randy Orton confronted Race and spat in his face, to go with Orton's "Legend Killer" persona. Race returned again for Raw's WWE Homecoming episode in October 2005, marking the show's return to the USA Network.

In 2004, Race was recruited to be a part of Total Nonstop Action Wrestling (TNA) as a member of their NWA Championship Committee. Despite reportedly being an authority figure as a member of the committee, he never made any official decisions and only made the occasional on-screen appearance for the company.

At the WWE Hall of Fame class of 2007 ceremony on March 31, 2007, Race and Dusty Rhodes were "inducted" into the Four Horsemen by Ric Flair and Arn Anderson. On the August 8, 2008, episode of Monday Night Raw, Race sat in the front row and was acknowledged by commentators Michael Cole and Jerry "The King" Lawler. Before the show, Race accompanied then-GHC Heavyweight Champion Takeshi Morishima to the ring for a dark match against Charlie Haas.

Race also made an appearance at TNA's Lockdown pay-per-view in 2007 as the special guest gatekeeper for the main event. Race made a special guest appearance at the second night of Ring of Honor's Glory by Honor VI: Night Two at the Manhattan Center on November 3, 2007, in New York City. On January 4, 2014, Race took part in New Japan Pro-Wrestling's Wrestle Kingdom 8 in Tokyo Dome event, participating in the title presentation before a match for the NWA World Heavyweight Championship and punching out defending champion Rob Conway's manager Bruce Tharpe.

== Promoting career ==
=== Heart of America Sports Attractions (1973–1986) ===
Earlier in his career, Race became involved in the ownership side of wrestling, buying a portion of the Kansas City and later St. Louis territories known as Heart of America Sports Attractions. St. Louis was a stronghold of the NWA, and around this time in 1984, WWF owner Vince McMahon began his invasion of NWA territories, including St. Louis, in his ambition to build a truly national wrestling promotion. Race was enraged, famously confronting Hulk Hogan and the Funk brothers at a WWF event in Kansas City. Race lost over $500,000 as an owner of the Kansas City territory, and despite his championship years being at an end and wishing to retire from active competition, was forced to rely on continuing to wrestle to make a living. He continued to travel in the United States and abroad, and signed with McMahon's WWF in 1986.

=== World League Wrestling (1999–2019) ===
Race spent several years away from the business, working briefly as a process server before retiring with his wife in small-town Missouri. In 1999, he started World League Wrestling (originally called World Legion Wrestling, but the name was changed a year later), an independent promotion which runs shows near Race's hometown of Eldon, Missouri, and other cities in Missouri, including Kansas City. A year later, he started Harley Race's Wrestling Academy, which sought to train up-and-coming wrestlers who could benefit from Race's unique experience and perspective on the wrestling business. Race's events were family-oriented and usually raised funds for local charities. As well as featuring his students, legends like Mick Foley, Terry Funk, Bret Hart, and even Mitsuharu Misawa have made guest appearances. WLW had a working agreement with Misawa's Japanese promotion, Pro Wrestling NOAH and had NOAH star Takeshi Morishima as a former heavyweight champion. He is credited with training Trevor Murdoch who was then known as Trevor Rhodes, and NOAH veterans Ace Steel, Superstar Steve, Brian Breaker, Jon Webb, Tommaso Ciampa, and Jack Gamble.

In 2014, Race and World League Wrestling relocated to Troy, Missouri. Along with relocating his wrestling academy and promotion, Race also built the Race Wrestling Arena, where events are put on once a month.

== Personal life and death ==
Race was born to sharecroppers Jay Allen Race and Mary Race in 1943. Race married his first wife, Vivian Jones, in 1960. She died five weeks after their wedding in the same car crash in which Race nearly lost a leg. Shortly after Vivian's death, Race married Sandra Jones, whom he briefly mentioned in his 2004 autobiography King of the Ring. This second marriage produced a daughter, Candice Marie, and ended in divorce. His third wife, Evon, divorced him in the early 1990s after over 30 years of marriage. Together they had a son, Justin, who was an amateur wrestler but never participated in professional wrestling. His fourth wife, Beverly (B.J.) was vice president of the Commerce Bank of Kansas City. They married in late 1995, shortly after Race's career-ending car crash. She often traveled with Race until she died of pneumonia. Race had five grandchildren.

Race continued running World League Wrestling (WLW) and his wrestling camp in Eldon, Missouri. He later moved the businesses to Troy. Many of his trainees were sent to the NOAH promotion in Japan for extra experience. Over the years he needed surgery to his neck, hip replacements, knee replacements and had five vertebra in his back fused together due to years of taking hard bumps. In May 2017, he broke both legs in a fall at his home, one in several places. He needed four blood transfusions during surgery. Race would continue to promote WLW until his death whilst in rehab.

=== Illness and death ===
On March 1, 2019, Race's close friend Ric Flair announced that Race was diagnosed with terminal lung cancer. On August 1, 2019, it was revealed by long time friend Dustin Rhodes that Race had died from lung cancer at the age of 76. He was buried next to his parents and one brother at Quitman Cemetery along Highway 113 in Quitman, Missouri.

== Other media ==
Race participated in the 1998 NBC special, Exposed! Pro Wrestling's Greatest Secrets. His face was covered to conceal his identity as he broke kayfabe and discussed the inner workings of the business.

Race's autobiography, King of the Ring: the Harley Race Story (ISBN 1-58261-818-6), was released on November 19, 2004. Along with Ricky Steamboat and Les Thatcher, Race is author of The Professional Wrestler's Workout and Instructional Guide.

Race played himself as the distinguished ring announcer for a tag team match involving Mil Mascaras and El Hijo del Santo in the 2007 film Mil Mascaras vs. the Aztec Mummy.

The career of Harley Race, became the subject of Vice TV's fifth season of the Dark Side of the Ring.

Race is portrayed by Kevin Anton in the 2023 Von Erich family film biopic The Iron Claw.

== Championship and accomplishments ==
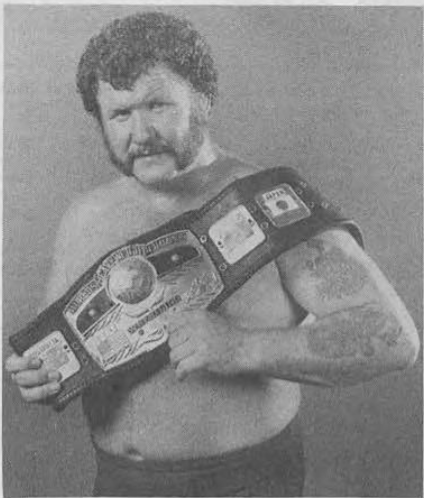
Race was an eight-time NWA World Heavyweight Champion.

- All Japan Pro Wrestling
  - NWA United National Championship (1 time) (Note: NWA United National Heavyweight Title history At wrestling-titles.com)
  - PWF World Heavyweight Championship (1 time) (Note: PWF World Heavyweight Title history At wrestling-titles.com)
- All Star Pro-Wrestling (New Zealand)
  - NWA World Heavyweight Championship (1 time) (Note: NWA World Heavyweight Title history At wrestling-titles.com)
- American Wrestling Association
  - AWA World Tag Team Championship (3 times) – with Larry Hennig ( Hennig replaced by Chris Markoff in their final reign) (Note: AWA World Tag Team Title history At wrestling-titles.com)
  - AWA Midwest Tag Team Championship (1) – with Dale Lewis (1)
- Cauliflower Alley Club
  - Iron Mike Mazurki Award (2006)
  - Posthumous Award (2025)
- Central States Wrestling
  - NWA Central States Brass Knuckles Championship(4 times)
  - NWA Central States Heavyweight Championship (9 times) (Note: NWA Central States Heavyweight Title history At wrestling-titles.com)
  - NWA North American Tag Team Championship (Central States version) (3 times) – with Baron von Raschke (2), Roger Kirby (1)
  - NWA World Heavyweight Championship (7 times)
  - NWA World Tag Team Championship (Central States version) (1 time) – with Pat O'Connor
- Championship Wrestling from Florida
  - NWA Florida Tag Team Championship (3 times) – with Roger Kirby (2), Bob Roop (1) (Note: Florida Tag Team Title history At wrestling-titles.com)
  - NWA Southern Heavyweight Championship (Florida version) (1 time) (Note: NWA Southern Heavyweight Title (Florida) history At wrestling-titles.com)
  - NWA United States Heavyweight Championship (Mid-Atlantic version) (1 time, inaugural)^{1} (Note: NWA/WCW United States Heavyweight Title history At wrestling-titles.com)
  - NWA World Heavyweight Championship (1 time)
- George Tragos/Lou Thesz Professional Wrestling Hall of Fame
  - Class of 2005
- NWA Mid-America
  - NWA Mid-America Heavyweight Championship (2 times) (Note: NWA Mid-America Heavyweight Title history At wrestling-titles.com)
- Eastern Sports Association
  - IW North American Heavyweight Championship (1 time) (Note: Maritimes North American Heavyweight Title history At wrestling-titles.com)
- Georgia Championship Wrestling
  - NWA Georgia Heavyweight Championship (1 time) (Note: NWA Georgia Heavyweight Title history At wrestling-titles.com)
  - NWA Macon Tag Team Championship (1 time) – with Buddy Colt (Note: NWA Macon Tag Team Title history At wrestling-titles.com)
  - NWA World Heavyweight Championship (1 time)
- Maple Leaf Wrestling
  - NWA World Heavyweight Championship (1 time)
- Missouri Sports Hall of Fame
  - Class of 2013
- National Wrestling Alliance
  - NWA World Heavyweight Championship (8 times)
  - NWA Hall of Fame (Class of 2005) (Note: NWA Hall of Fame Inductees At wrestling-titles.com)
- New England Pro Wrestling Hall of Fame
  - Class of 2014
- NWA Hollywood Wrestling
  - Los Angeles Battle Royal (1969)
- Pro Wrestling Illustrated
  - Match of the Year (1973) vs. Dory Funk Jr. on May 24
  - Match of the Year (1979) vs. Dusty Rhodes on August 21
  - Match of the Year (1983) vs. Ric Flair on June 10
  - Stanley Weston Award (2006)
  - Wrestler of the Year (1979, 1983)
  - Ranked No. 8 of the 500 best singles wrestlers during the PWI Years in 2003
- Professional Wrestling Hall of Fame and Museum
  - Class of 2004 (Note: Professional Wrestling Hall of Fame and Museum Inductees At wrestling-titles.com)
  - Class of 2017 – Inducted as a part of a tag team with Larry "The Axe" Hennig
- St. Louis Wrestling Club
  - NWA Missouri Heavyweight Championship (7 times) (Note: NWA Missouri Heavyweight Title history At wrestling-titles.com)
  - NWA World Heavyweight Championship (1 time)
- Stampede Wrestling
  - Stampede North American Heavyweight Championship (1 time) (Note: Stampede Wrestling North American Heavyweight Title history At wrestling-titles.com)
  - Stampede Wrestling Hall of Fame (Class of 1995)
- St. Louis Wrestling Hall of Fame
  - Class of 2007
- Tokyo Sports
  - Match of the Year (1978) vs. Jumbo Tsuruta on January 20
- World Championship Wrestling (Australia)
  - IWA World Tag Team Championship (1 time) – with Larry Hennig (Note: IWA World Tag Team Title history At wrestling-titles.com)
- World Championship Wrestling
  - WCW Hall of Fame (Class of 1994) (Note: WCW Hall of Fame Inductees At wrestling-titles.com)
- World Wrestling Association
  - WWA World Heavyweight Championship (1 time) (Note: WWA World Heavyweight Title (Indianapolis) history At wrestling-titles.com)
- World Wrestling Council
  - WWC Caribbean Heavyweight Championship (1 time) (Note: WWC Caribbean Heavyweight Title history At wrestling-titles.com)
- World Wrestling Federation/Entertainment
  - King of the Ring (1986)
  - Sam Muchnick Memorial Tournament (1986)
  - WWE Hall of Fame (Class of 2004) (Note: WWF/WWE Hall of Fame Inductees At wrestling-titles.com)
  - Slammy Awards (2 times)
    - Best Ring Apparel (1987)
    - Bobby "The Brain" Heenan Scholarship Award (1987) with Haku, Tama, André the Giant, Hercules, and King Kong Bundy
- Wrestling Observer Newsletter
  - Match of the Year (1983) vs. Ric Flair at Starrcade
  - Wrestler of the Year (1980, 1981)
  - Wrestling Observer Newsletter Hall of Fame (Class of 1996)
