= Sam Muchnick Memorial Tournament =

1986 World Wrestling Federation supercard

The Sam Muchnick Memorial Tournament
- Promotion: World Wrestling Federation
- Date: August 29, 1986
- City: St. Louis, Missouri
- Venue: Kiel Auditorium
- Attendance: 10,612

The Sam Muchnick Memorial Tournament was a World Wrestling Federation (WWF) supercard held at the sold-out Kiel Auditorium in St. Louis, Missouri on August 29, 1986, attended by nearly 11,000 fans and making $87,000. The tournament was arranged by Larry Matysik, a protege of Muchnick.

The event was held as a tribute to longtime St. Louis promoter Sam Muchnick and featured a 16-man single-elimination tournament, which saw Harley Race defeat Ricky Steamboat in the tournament finals. The main event included a match between Hulk Hogan and Paul Orndorff for the WWF World Heavyweight Championship.

== Results ==
No.	Results	Stipulations	Times
1	Harley Race defeated Brian Blair	Sam Muchnick Memorial Tournament 1st Round match	6:22
2	Don Muraco vs. Greg "The Hammer" Valentine ended in a double-disqualification As a result, Harley Race received a bye in the next round	Sam Muchnick Memorial Tournament 1st Round match	0:58
3	Adrian Adonis defeated King Tonga	Sam Muchnick Memorial Tournament 1st Round match	2:31
4	Junkyard Dog defeated Hercules Hernandez	Sam Muchnick Memorial Tournament 1st Round match	8:56
5	Brutus Beefcake defeated Lanny Poffo	Sam Muchnick Memorial Tournament 1st Round match	3:12
6	Pedro Morales defeated Dory Funk, Jr.	Sam Muchnick Memorial Tournament 1st Round match	5:33
7	Billy Jack Haynes defeated Jimmy Jack Funk	Sam Muchnick Memorial Tournament 1st Round match	4:15
8	Ricky Steamboat defeated Jim Brunzell	Sam Muchnick Memorial Tournament 1st Round match	7:10
9	Junkyard Dog defeated Adrian Adonis	Sam Muchnick Memorial Tournament Quarterfinal match	5:02
10	Brutus Beefcake defeated Pedro Morales	Sam Muchnick Memorial Tournament Quarterfinal match	10:34
11	Ricky Steamboat defeated Billy Jack Haynes	Sam Muchnick Memorial Tournament Quarterfinal match	5:58
12	Harley Race defeated Junkyard Dog	Sam Muchnick Memorial Tournament Semifinal match	10:38
13	Ricky Steamboat defeated Brutus Beefcake	Sam Muchnick Memorial Tournament Semifinal match	12:23
14	Harley Race defeated Ricky Steamboat	Sam Muchnick Memorial Tournament Final match	7:04
15	Hulk Hogan (c) vs. Paul Orndorff ended in a double-disqualification	Singles match for the WWF World Heavyweight Championship	16:08
(c) / – the champion(s) heading into the match

== Tournament bracket ==
1st Round; Sam Muchnick Memorial Tournament; August 29, 1986
Harley Race	Pinfall
B. Brian Blair	6:22
The Magnificent Moraco	Disqualification (0:58)
Greg Valentine	Disqualification (0:58)
King Tonga	2:31
Adrian Adonis	Pinfall
Hercules Hernandez	8:58
Junkyard Dog	Pinfall
Brutus Beefcake	Pinfall
Lanny Poffo	3:12
Hoss Funk	5:33
Pedro Morales	Pinfall
Billy Jack Haynes	Pinfall
Jimmy Jack Funk	4:15
Jim Brunzell	7:10
Ricky Steamboat	Pinfall

Quarterfinals; Sam Muchnick Memorial Tournament; August 29, 1986
Harley Race	Bye
N/A	—
Adrian Adonis	5:02
Junkyard Dog	Pinfall
Brutus Beefcake	Pinfall
Pedro Morales	10:34
Billy Jack Haynes	5:58
Ricky Steamboat	Pinfall

Semifinals; Sam Muchnick Memorial Tournament; August 29, 1986
Harley Race	Pinfall
Junkyard Dog	10:38
Brutus Beefcake	12:23
Ricky Steamboat	Pinfall

Final; Sam Muchnick Memorial Tournament; August 29, 1986
Harley Race	Submission
Ricky Steamboat	7:04
