= Ramón Álvarez (wrestler) =

Dominican wrestler

Personal information
- Born: San Cristóbal, Dominican Republic

Professional wrestling career
- Ring name(s): El Bronco I El Solitario
- Debut: 1983

Ramón Álvarez is a Dominican wrestler also known as El Bronco No. 1. Bronco's career reached the highest level both in his native Dominican Republic and Puerto Rico, accumulating a resume in the ring that extends to a total of twenty-eight years. El Bronco has held championship titles in the World Wrestling Council (WWC), World Wrestling Association (WWA Puerto Rico) and National Wrestling Alliance (NWA).

== Professional wrestling career ==
He debuted in 1983. In 1984, he started reaching higher levels in Dominicana de Espectaculos, a promotion in the Dominican Republic which was affiliated with the National Wrestling Alliance. He was a tag team champion together with El Bronco No. 2 called "Los Hermanos Broncos". In 1988, El Bronco No. 3 joined the team. In 1989, "Los Hermanos Broncos", together with Relampago Hernandez, Johnny Gomez, Super Star, Thunderman and others left Dominicana de Espectaculos and founded a new promotion: the Dominican Wrestling Federation, which signed a strategic alliance with the World Wrestling Council (WWC), based in Puerto Rico.

In early 1990, El Bronco No. 1 defeated Huracan Castillo Jr. in the Dominican Republic for the WWC Latin American Championship and received an offer to work for WWC in Puerto Rico. El Bronco moved to Puerto Rico in the summer of 1990.

That same year, El Bronco became very popular with the Puerto Rican fans and came to the ring with a valet named Amarilys, they both danced Merengue before and after the matches. Formed a tag team with Invader I and defeated the Texas Hangmen for the WWC Tag Team Championship and they successfully defended the titles against teams like the Samoan Swat Team and the Caribbean Express (Huracan Castillo Jr. and Miguelito Perez). El Bronco also did wrestling announcing.

Between 1993 and 1995, El Bronco held the WWC Tag Team Championship together with Ciclon Salvadoreño and Ray Gonzalez. However, his main goal was the WWC Universal Championship, held by Carlos Colon and while a member of the Justice Army, the team led by Colon, he was not going to be able to gain the title. That is when he decided to turn heel on the Justice Army and started challenging Colon for the Universal Championship. In that feud, El Bronco lost his mask, having worn it for 14 years. This year long feud culminated on July 14, 1996, when they faced each other in Caguas, Puerto Rico at Anniversary 1996 main event, El Bronco being beaten by Colon and having to quit WWC. This match is considered one of the best matches in WWC history. In 1998, he returned to WWC as El Solitario, a masked wrestler, revealing his identity when Colon took his mask off. He worked for 12 years in WWC, mainly as a heel, and has been the Universal Champion three times.

El Bronco had an incident with the fans in Loiza, Puerto Rico for making racial slurs that resulted with the fans burning El Bronco's car outside on the parking lots. Loíza has high ratio of black people.

He feuded with almost every Puerto Rican fan favorite even villainous Abdullah The Butcher and Dutch Mantel.

In 2003, El Bronco feuded with his Compadre and long time ally Rico Suave. Earlier that same year El Bronco formed a stable called La Revolución Dominicana (The Dominican Revolution) made mostly of Dominican wrestlers.

El Bronco toured Spain with IWS wrestling in the summer of 2008. Also worked for IWA, the competition for WWC in Puerto Rico. He served as a special referee in a match between Savio Vega and Joe Bravo, which held on July 17, 2010.

Still wrestle on occasions in WWC against the likes of Invader I and Chicano for the WWC Puerto Rico Heavyweight Championship.

== Championships and accomplishments ==
- World Wrestling Council
  - WWC Dominican Republic Heavyweight Championship (2 times)
  - WWC Puerto Rico Heavyweight Championship (6 times)
  - WWC Television Championship (1 time)
  - WWC Caribbean Heavyweight Championship (1 time)
  - NWA Latin American Heavyweight Championship (1 time)
  - WWC Medalla Heavyweight Championship (1 time)
  - WWC Universal Heavyweight Championship (3 times)
  - WWC World Tag Team Championship (10 times) - with Invader I (3), Ray Gonzalez (3), Ciclón Salvadoreño (1), Super Gladiador (1), El Diamante (1) and Rico Suave (1)
- World Wrestling Alliance (Puerto Rico)
  - WWA Puerto Rico Heavyweight Championship (1 time)
