= Shadia Bseiso =

Jordian professional wrestler

- Born: June 20, 1986 (age 40); Amman, Jordan
- Education: American University of Beirut

Shadia Bseiso (Arabic: شادية بسيسو, born June 20, 1986) is a Jordanian TV presenter, jiu-jitsu athlete and professional wrestler. In October 2017, Bseiso became the first Jordanian female wrestler from the Middle East to sign a contract with WWE, the world's largest wrestling company.

== Biography ==
Shadia Bseiso was born on 20 June 1986 in Amman, Jordan. She has a bachelor's degree in business administration from the American University of Beirut. She began her career as a TV presenter and voice-over artist for a Dubai-based media group. Her sister Arifa Bseiso is also a boxing champion in Jordan. Bseiso competed in the 2014 Abu Dhabi World Pro Championship where she got the silver medal in her weight category and the bronze medal overall.

Bseiso, a Brazilian jiu-jitsu athlete and a CrossFit enthusiast, participated in an invitation-only WWE tryout in Dubai along with 40 men and women from the Middle East and India in February 2017. In October she was accepted and signed with WWE becoming the first Arabic-speaking female wrestler from the Middle East. Until her expected debut in January 2018 she told the Jordan Times: "I am preparing mentally and physically. I am doing rigorous training with my coach to get me in the best shape before I train full time at the WWE Performance Centre". She revealed to media that she is planning for a Jordan-themed persona, but did not elaborate. In one interview Bseiso said: "I want to be myself, and I grew up in the Middle East, I’m from Jordan, so that’s definitely going to be part of my character and my story. I feel like that’s one of the things that I can add". Bseiso, requested her release from WWE in April 2019.
