= World Wrestling Council =

Puerto Rican professional wrestling promotion

- Acronym: WWC
- Founded: September 13, 1973; 53 years ago
- Style: Professional wrestling, sports entertainment, Hardcore wrestling
- Headquarters: San Juan, Puerto Rico
- Founder(s): Carlos Colón; Victor Jovica; Gorilla Monsoon
- Owner(s): Victor Jovica; Carlos Colón
- Formerly: Capitol Sports Promotions (1973–1995); World Wrestling Council (1995–present)

The World Wrestling Council (WWC; Spanish: "Consejo Mundial de Lucha") is a professional wrestling promotion based in Puerto Rico. It was originally established as Capitol Sports Promotions in 1973 by Carlos Colón, Victor Jovica, and Gorilla Monsoon. By the mid-1990s, the promotion had changed its name to the World Wrestling Council. It was a member of the National Wrestling Alliance until 1988. WWC is among the oldest professional wrestling promotions in the world and one of only eight in the entire world to reach its 50th anniversary in continuous operation.

== History ==
=== Beginnings (1970s) ===
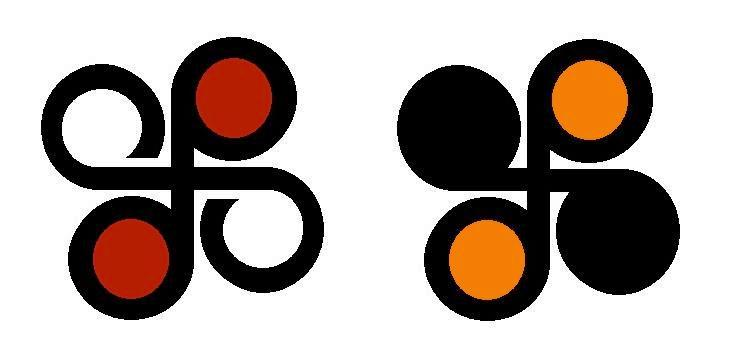
The two versions of the Capitol Sports Promotions logo.

Capitol Sports Promotions, with Carlos Colón, Victor Jovica and Gorilla Monsoon as promoters/co-owners of the organization, was a member of the National Wrestling Alliance (NWA) until late 1988, when Gorilla Monsoon left. The company then went bankrupt (as confirmed by Víctor Quiñones in an interview with prwrestling.com). Thomas Collado was the owner in 1976, before Carlos Colón and Victor Jovica. The promotion operated from its headquarters, located in Santurce, San Juan.

Capitol Sports Promotions gained fame in Puerto Rican homes soon after their TV show, Super Estrellas de la Lucha Libre, went on-air every weekend on channel 4, WAPA-TV. The taped show is still aired on weekends (both Saturday and Sunday for two hours until March 2008 when it was reduced to one hour on both Saturdays and Sundays due to declining ratings). From 1973 to 1980 it aired on channel 11 (Telecadena Pérez Perry, then on Teleonce after the before mentioned went off the air), on channel 7 on Sunday evenings at 6pm and on Telemundo on Saturday mornings at 10am.

=== Pinnacle (1980s) ===
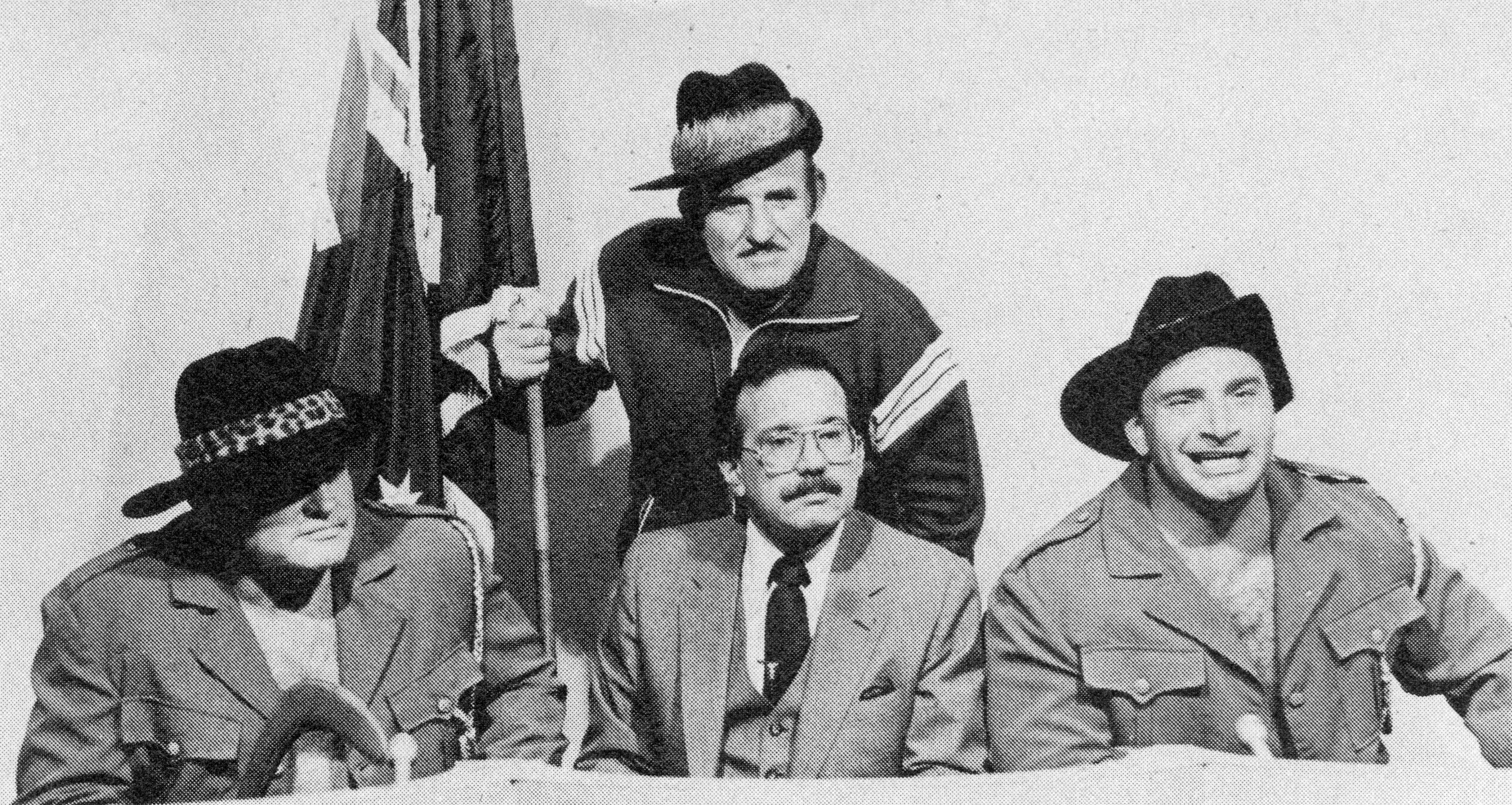
Rickin Sánchez on the interview set of Superestrellas de la Lucha Libre in 1982, interviewing the Fabulous Kangaroos (from left, Don Kent, Al Costello and Johnny Heffernan).

Capitol Sports Promotions began touring all over the island, and with the golden era of boxing in Puerto Rico limited only to Ponce Aguadilla and the metropolitan area of Puerto Rico, Capitol Sports Promotions took their shows to many, inner country towns where people were not used to seeing live in-ring sports events. As a result, Capitol's shows usually filled the smaller town arenas. CSP also benefited from collaborations, including a talent exchange agreement with Mario Savoldi's International Championship Wrestling (ICW).

During one specific stretch, CSP sold out a 30,000 venue at Bayamón during 13 consecutive shows. High-profile wrestlers were winning in the range of $3,000–5,000 per weekend.

In 1983, Rickin Sánchez had taken over as Capitol's main promoter, as well as becoming one of the organization's broadcasters on the television shows. He was joined by the already retired Savinovich. Some time later, Sánchez (and his production company R & F Television) left the production of Superestrellas de la Lucha Libre due to some disagreements with the ownership of WWC. After these events, Savinovich became the main host of the programs.

The World Wrestling Council was a member National Wrestling Alliance from 1979 until 1987.

As the market remained a lucrative and "hot territory" within the organization, the presence of the NWA World Heavyweight Championship became ubiquitous in large events, predominantly represented by perennial headliner Ric Flair. On January 6, 1983, Colón defeated the latter to complete an unofficial run with the belt, retaining momentum afterwards and being ranked in Pro Wrestling Illustrated's "Top 10" throughout 1984.

=== Death of Bruiser Brody (1988) ===
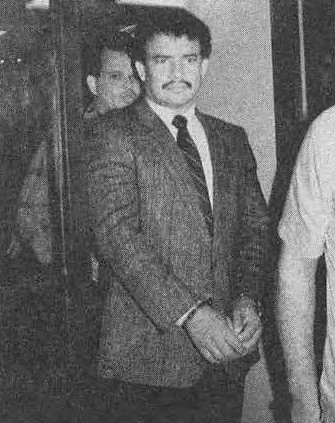
José Huertas González in handcuffs after being charged in connection with Brody's death

On July 16, 1988, American star Bruiser Brody was stabbed at the locker room of the Juan Ramon Loubriel Stadium in Bayamón, prior to a show. Brody died from the stab wounds later on that night. The man who stabbed him was fellow wrestler and booker José Huertas-González, known as Invader I. The two men had a real-life feud that led to a confrontation in the locker room that concluded with Brody receiving stab wounds to his chest and stomach. The only one to witness the series of events that ended in the death was WWC wrestler Tony Atlas. Atlas said he saw both men enter the shower area of the locker room (nobody actually heard or saw what went on in the shower). Atlas claims he looked over to Carlos Colón, and then heard sounds and saw Brody hunched over with González brandishing a bloody knife about to finish Brody off. Atlas and Colón rushed to keep them apart along with several angry wrestlers.

After Brody's death, and the negative publicity that followed, WWC went through some difficult years. Mr. Jose Huertas-Gonzalez was acquitted by a jury after he testified in his own defense, and claimed self-defense. The witnesses who were supposed to testify about the murder claimed that they did not get their summons until after the trial was over.

=== Rebrand (1990s) ===
By the mid-1990s, with the NWA territorial system largely dismantled, the organization changed its official name to World Wrestling Council in order to proclaim its regional titles as world titles. Women also began to have an ever-increasing presence in the organization during that decade. WWC also experienced other problems, issues with immigration concerning the visas of Mexican wrestlers Villano III, Pierroth Jr., El Texano and Jerry Estrada while working an invasion angle with Asistencia Asesoría y Administración. On March 9, 1999, Jovica and Colón registered World Wrestling Council, Inc. at the Puerto Rico Department of State as president/agent and vice-president respectively.

=== WWC vs. IWA-PR ===
With the turn of the century came some changes that troubled the franchise. A promotion called International Wrestling Association (IWA-PR), promoted by Víctor Quiñones, became WWC's biggest competitor when it made an alliance with wrestling giant the World Wrestling Federation (WWF) which in turn brought American superstars to IWA-PR.

WWC adopted a strict protocol of expelling problematic fans, such as those that threw objects to the ring, mimicking rival IWA. The promotion also used strategies outside the ring to undermine its competition, including tipping the Treasury Department when other promotions held events.

In 2001, WWC began a collaboration with the XWF, which saw Ray González and Carly Colón wrestle for the nascent promotion. Backstage footage of the tapings Universal Studios in Orlando, Florida were intermingled with an angle involving Barrabás and La Familia del Milenio. The angle would have led to a match between González and Hulk Hogan, with interactions between both being aired on Superestrellas de la Lucha Libre. Carlos Colón negotiated this participation, but it ultimately failed to materialize, the XWF stagnated as it failed to sell television rights for its content. Hogan himself left and returned to WWE.

On July 12, 2002, Colón, Sr. was involved in a discussion with Kobbo Santarrosa, host of Televicentro's SuperXclusivo show. Five days later, there were reports that the incident had been adapted into an angle.

Parallel to this, the promotion faced issues with the regularity of payment of several wrestlers, who failed to attend a card held on July 17, 2002. After three weeks of no-showing his scheduled dates, maineventer Ray González left the company and began negotiations with the IWA. On July 25, 2002, it was reported that WWC responded to González leaving by bringing in wrestlers from abroad, in particular from Florida, and had completed the arrangements to begin the airing of the XWF tapings as a tandem to WWC at Televicentro.

On October 13, 2002, both promotions announced a card to be held on the same date and venue in Cayey venue for October 18. Ultimately, IWA presented its event, while WWC did not hold one on that day. On October 20, 2002, Televicentro aired Invasion 2002: El Especial en Vivo, a special show broadcast live as part of the interpromotional angle between WWC and XWF. WWC Continued promoting its product in Televicentro's programming, this time as part of a multi-program collaboration that began with segments in a show named Zúmbate where a hidden camera prank was played on Laureano. The angle was continued at SuperXclusivo, where Colón and Santarosa reached a truce of sorts, but Laureano interrupted and argued with both. A wrestling special was then aired in Zúmbate, where several members of the roster performed. In the same program, three masked wrestlers that were supposedly randomly recruited were revealed to be Santarrosa, Carly and Eddie Colón, which led to Laureano attacking all three.

On November 14, 2002, Laureano participated in another Televicentro show, this time Club Sunshine where he confronted Sunshine Logrono while the latter was performing under the wrestling-related character of Vitin Alicea. On November 18, 2002, the reintroduction of the Puerto Rico Heavyweight Championship was announced. Entering into December, WWC led IWA in rating after the latter experienced a drop. Further expanding into the mainstream programming, Carly and Eddie Colón were also featured in a commercial for the ACE brand.

In April 2003, a lawsuit against González led to the wrestler receiving a subpoena from a Marshall in an IWA show. On April 21, 2003, it was made public that El Nene left the promotion with the Puerto Rico Heavyweight Championship in his possession. In May 2003, Santarosa was involved in another angle with WWC, this time with Alvarez. WWC announced this month that as part of an agreement with Memphis Wrestling, a tournament to crown the tag team champions of that promotion would be held in Puerto Rico, though no more details where unveiled.

In May 2003, Juan Rivera and Eddie Colón encountered each other in a restaurant, entering into an argument about the practices and product of their respective promotions. The IWA turned this into an angle, where they belittled Colón as a "fan" of Armando Gorbea. On May 29, 2003, a copy of a letter that WWC sent to Telemundo in response for its use of the name "TNT" was made public. On June 1, 2003, it was revealed that the tournament for the titles announced weeks before was a plot device so that a new set of XWF World Tag Team Champions could be crowned in a phantom change.

During the summer of 2003, the weekly edition of Superestrellas de la Lucha Libre suffered a modification, after Joe Don Smith left due to economic differences and the section that he hosted, Ringside con Joe Don Smith, was removed. A new section with Pantojas, titled Cara a cara con El Profe was soon introduced. On July 17, 2003, Thunder and Lightning appeared in Club Sunshine in order to promote Aniversario 2003. When Jose Huertas González joined the IWA, WWC retaliated by airing matches involving Bruiser Brody. The promotion escalated their attack by airing a match between both. WWC continued trying to make crossovers by making moves to book Gino "The Punisher" Rochell, who was scheduled to an MMA event titled Tatami Tournament Championship 4 which was ultimately postponed and rescheduled to March 6, 2004. On September 6, 2003, the promotion brought Logrono as a special manager for an event, continuing its long-running collaboration with the WAPA-TV producer.

=== Colón as promoter of WWE ===
In early 2004, it was reported that WWC was interested in selling a fraction of its stocks to an investor, with Panda Energy and Jimmy Hart emerging as potential buyers. Despite the latter's involvement, any future plans to relaunch XWF and work another joint angle were placed on hold. The continuation of the working relationship was teased in a backstage segment aired weeks later. As part of these conversations, Hart attended a WWC card held on February 21, 2004, bringing a group of potential investors with him.

On March 23, 2004, WWC contracted Dutch Mantell as its new head booker. He was also stated to be involved in the ongoing conversations between Panda Energy and WWC. Soon afterwards it was reported that Eddie Colón had been chosen as Puerto Rico's representative in NWA-TNA's Americas X Cup tournament. However, his participation was postponed. The agreement brought further advantages, such as the move of NWA-TNA wrestler Abyss from IWA to WWC, and the arrival of Ron Killings. The IWA responded by contacting NWA-TNA and prohibiting the use of contracted wrestler Apolo, while they had a working relationship with WWC.

On April 1, 2004, the promotion debuted a new segment in its programming named El Sandungueo Club hosted by Jose Rivera, Jr., which included invitees from other fields such as urban artists. However, the initiative was short-lived, as Rivera, Jr. was forced to leave Puerto Rico to attend personal matters. Soon afterwards, El Wizard Analiza with narrator Antonio Montesinos (better known by his ringname El Wizard), took prominence. The promotion made other changes to their programming, such as airing an hour long special dedicated to classic matches. The promotion's association with NWA-TNA suffered a setback when WWE did not allow Carly Colón to wrestle Abyss, citing that it could be seen as an interpromotional match. During this timeframe, the promotion also held a card in the establishment of one of its long-time sponsors, Playa 79. The rivalry between promotions also resulted in occasional confrontations to ensure the availability of a venue.

In May 2004, the schedule of a local AAA baseball league and rain, the promotion decided to enter a brief hiatus until June. During this timeframe, there was speculation that the promotion could close, with contracted wrestlers reporting internal instability. These concerns were exacerbated when Mantell left his post as head booker and returned to work full time with NWA-TNA in anticipation of the first editions of TNA Impact!, only collaborating with WWC in the booking of Abyss. Several talents decided to leave. The promotion responded by revamping its image, debuting a new logo on June 1, 2004. However, the assistance diminished and, combined with other unforeseen problems, this led to a series of cancelled cards. The promotion resumed operations and returned to Trinidad & Tobago, eventually recovering some ground by having a now-heel Carly wrestle his brother at Aniversario. The passing of tropical storm Jeanne over Puerto Rico in September 2004 affected the organization of cards during this month due to a week-long blackout. Another cancellation was forced by the low turnout of a card that was scheduled the night of the return to action of boxing world champion Felix Trinidad against Ricardo Mayorga.

During the offseason, the promotion modified the horary of their shows to accommodate special programming in the channel. In January 2005, WWC was forced to replace Abyss in his cards after the wrestler requested a release from TNA. In June 2005, it was announced that WWC would be involved in the production of a CD and DVD. That same week, it was announced that WWC would pay homage to Bruiser Brody in an eponymous cup. On July 7, 2005, WWC announced that they had reached an exclusivity contract with WWE and would collaborate in the staging of their Raw Live presentations. In August 2005, it was reported that WWE had further plans for both IWA and WWC.

=== NWS partnership (2005–2006) ===
During the final quarter of 2005, WWC entered into an alliance with emergent promotion New Wrestling Stars (NWS), which had just broken a working relationship with the IWA, and scheduled February 5, 2006 as tentative end of the alliance. Both promotions would collaborate in an angle where José Luis Rivera, José Chaparro and Cesar Vargas wanted to buy WWC, but were declined, beginning an inter-promotional war. Aniversario 2005 was a collaborative effort and featured a series between wrestlers of both promotions that was tied until the last match, where Carlito was booked to take the win for WWC by defeating Shane Sewell. In March it was announced that more wrestlers from NWA-TNA would be arriving. In April, a fraction of NWS' directives split to form World Wrestling Stars (WWS). The promotion also lost its television spot to this new splinter. On April 19, 2006, the remaining representatives of NWS held a reunion to attend the crisis and decided to continue operating under a new agreement with WWC, which allowed them to replace the lost show with a half-hour segment in Superestrellas de la Lucha Libre titled NWS Report. The promotion also allowed some of its talent to participate in a charity show organized by New Wrestling Generation (NWG). During the last week of June, German Figueroa left the IWA for NWS despite remaining under contract, making an appearance in one of its cards. Victor Jovica decided not to air the segment in the NWS Report in order to avoid legal repercussions. The following week, NWS was forced to cancel a show due to a problem with WWC' s promoter, beginning an internal conflict between both promotions. On July 8, 2006, it was reported that NWS and WWC had finished their agreement, cancelling the airing of the NWS Report in Superestrellas de la Lucha Libre.

=== Collaborations ===
On July 9, 2006, it was reported that the IWA-PR and WWC administrations had discussed the possibility of cooperating with each other, even discussing a potential inter-promotional angle. Universal champion Black Pain made several appearances for NWG while the independent promotion responded in kind by dedicating a cup to Carlos Colón. WWC also organized a softball team, which participated in games in communities. In late October, Colón was involved in a legitimate confrontation with Huertas at Super Xclusivo, which WWC repurposed for promotion. In November the promotion participated in activities to celebrate Children's Day.

That same month, WWC was involved in a dispute with independent promotion PRWA, which claimed that Colón, Sr. and Jovica prevented the participation of Eddie Colón in one of its cards. On November 24, 2006, it was reported that WWC was expanding its programming to Supercanal 33 in the Dominican Republic, giving it more exposition in the United States since the channel retransmits there. In December 2006, the promotion negotiated the acquisition of several talents, including foreigners Scott Hall and Vampiro. This last return was coordinated by Mario Savoldi. However, the first was preemptively removed from promotional material after suddenly cutting communications.

=== La Rabia, heist of the Universal Heavyweight Championship (2007–2008) ===
In February 2007, WWC aired a special three hour edition of Superestrellas de la Lucha Libre. During this month, the promotion also lost one of its foreign wrestlers in Tim Arson, but evaluated Psychosis and Lita. For Honor vs. Traicion, the promotion brought back Dutch Mantell. Jovica was also involved in the promotion of a Monster Truck show where Jerry Lawler was involved. In March, WWC began working parallel angles in Dominican television to promote a series of shows to be held there. In March, Savoldi and WWC's administration were involved in a conflict and Billy Kidman and Psychosis, who had been announced to appear in cards during this month, jumped to IWA when the agent joined that promotion. In May, WWC announced that they would host their Aniversario event at the Jose Miguel Agrelot Coliseum. In June, the promotion was involved in negotiations with several wrestlers, including Ray González and the tag team Thunder and Lightning. These would include the negotiations surrounding an ongoing lawsuit that Jovica filed against González when he first left to the IWA. During this time, Carmen Calixto served a promoter for WWC. Besides securing the appearance of Scott Hall, WWC also negotiated with TNA talents, leading to a match between WWE signee and TNA wrestler Christian Cage. In July 2007, WWC acquired Hector Melendez then-Asistencia Asesoria y Administracion's booker and a former IWA and TNA writer. Besides holding an open press conference, the promotion expanded their promotions to several stations beside WAPA-TV, including Univision and radio stations WKAQ AM and Salsoul. That same month, WWC announced a partnership with All Japan Pro Wrestling that resulted in The Great Muta and Nosawa appearing in their cards. The entrance of Melendez resulted in several IWA wrestlers with ties to him appearing in WWC programming with their identities concealed. In September it was announced that Carlos Colón had held reunions with WWE to evaluate the possibility of WWC becoming a developmental territory and other business aspects. After it was revealed that Jovica was founding rebel group La Rabia, Superestrellas de la Lucha Libre was broadcast from a set lacking the WWC logo and using LRWA, with the stable hosting Lo que esta Pasando. Its cards were promoted as "WWC and LRWA presents" to sell the angle. In November WWC announced its return to Jose Miguel Agrelot Coliseum. In December, it was reported that Colón, Sr. had held reunions with John Lauraniatis about becoming a developmental territory in exchange for talent appearances, but WWE had no interest because its shows in Puerto Rico already sold well and it did not need further promotion, preferring to only keep Colón as its local promoter. Ultimately it was reported that WWC was under consideration, but that it was discarded due to the differences of in-ring style. Instead, the promotion announced Chris Masters, and international talents Ron Killings, ultimo dragon and former WCW talents Konnan and Scott Hall, despite being stripped at Lockout for no showing the cards due to being "in no condition" to wrestle. That same month, WWC announced the release of another DVD, Anniversary 1985–1988. None of La Rabia members made their scheduled appearances for the first date of the Euphoria tour. Following the absences, it was reported that there had been conversations between the group and IWA during the offseason. On January 6, 2008, Big made a surprise appearance at Histeria Boricua while carrying WWC's Universal heavyweight Championship belt and challenged the IWA World Heavyweight Champion, his former partner Lozada, to an unification match. After he made his initial appearance, WWC's merchandising executive Jose Roberto Rodriguez entered the building and demanded that the belt was returned, but IWA personnel had taken the belt elsewhere and Salovi confronted him. For the unification, Big carried the Revolution X-Treme wrestling belt that belonged to Rivera and lost the match to Lozada. In an interview with mainstream newspaper Primera Hora, Colón, Sr. denied that Big was still champion and warned that they would pursue a case for illegal appropriation if the belt wasn't immediately returned. The promoter also claimed that Melendez and La Rabia were aware that they would be fired and decided to do a preemptive strike. For its following program, IWA announced that they would air footage of the event, which was done in an edited fashion. In an NWA Report, the IWA announced that they would retire the old belt and introduce a new one to represent the Undisputed Championship. WWC responded by airing a segment where it boasted putting down La Rabia (which is translated as "The Rabies") and aired a segment where the commission and insisted that Big wasn't champion at Histeria Boricua.

=== Format changes ===
In February, one of WWC's talents, Joe Bravo, made an appearance in Club Sunshine. In March, WWC cancelled its cards and programming for the weekend where primaries where political held. On March 22, 2008, it was reported that WAPA-TV had decided to cut two hours of programming to WWC's Superestrellas de la Lucha Libre block. These changes where not reflected in their Wapa America shows. On April 27, 2008, WWC changed the programming hour to accommodate political affairs. In May 2008, WWC announced that after participating in a tryout mediated by the promotion, Black Pain had signed with WWE. That same month, WWC laid off several members of its mostly inactive female division. For Aniversario, WWC decided to bring foreign talent once again, this time Bobby Lashley. On June 12, 2008, an interview with Univision's Anda pal Cara show served to sell an angle where González interrupted an interview of Colón, Sr. and Carly Colón and revealed his identity.

Entering July, WWC made a number of announcements including the firing of Bryan, that Trevor Murdoch would face Eddie Colón at Aniversario and that the winner of the tournament for the Universal Championship would receive a new belt. The promotion also aired specials about Carlito Colón and Ray González to promote their upcoming match. During this time, WWC also held negotiations with Steve Corino to join the promotion as an active talent and booker. He joined other talents such as Eugene for Aniversario, Chessman and Teddy Hart were announced but removed later. Following Aniversario, WWC arranged to bring Christopher Daniels to serve as challenger for the new Universal Champion, Noriega. The promotion began bringing former champions to challenge for the belt, integrating Shane Sewell and contacting Black Pain, who did not join. WWC also revamped its television show.

In August 2008, both WWC and IWA lost talents to the re-branded EWO, in the case of the promotion these were of talents and included Universal Heavyweight Champion Noriega. This damaged the creative plans that WWC had with the wrestler, which included more defenses against international talents with arrangements with wrestlers such as Samoa Joe being made. This incident was combined with other complications, such as suspending a card. WWC took measures such as bringing in Corino for a longer run. On September 20, 2008, Jovica announced the adoption of new rules, including that throwing a wrestler over the third rope would result in a disqualification.

In October, the promotion announced the incorporation of foreign talents Ramón Alvarez and Slash Venom. Prior to the 2008 general elections, the promotion accommodated a candidate for the PPR in its programming. The promotion also cancelled one of its cards in October.

=== Reliance on international talent ===
In November, the promotion announced that Sabu, the Dudley Boyz, Elijah Burke, Armando Alejandro Estrada and Balls Mahoney would appear at Lockout, where a ceremony for Abdullah the Butchers purported retirement from wrestling would take place. A plaque was presented and among the wrestlers present in the event was Smith Hart.

For Euphoria, WWC made arrangements to bring several foreign talents, including Big Daddy V and Eugene, which were expected to join those that appeared at Lockout. After being contracted foe Euphoria, the promotion also extended Ricky Reyes's stay. In February, WWC announced the arrival of Idol Stevens. After reports claimed that Laureano was leaving for PRWA, WWC clarified that this was inaccurate. The promotion also scheduled Sabu for a return. For La Hora de La Verdad, WWC held a promotion allusive to their association with WWE, awarding tickets for 12 Rounds along a limited number of ringside tickets. In March, WWC made several announcements including the delay of Rudy's return to the ring and the creation of a new webpage. After IWA announced the return of Sewell to its roster, WWC made arrangements so that he would join them instead. Despite having to cancel a card in April, WWC announced the incorporation of female wrestlers. The promotion cut its ties with Sara Jay due to discipline issues. Aniversario 2009 was dedicated to Hugo Savinovich, who began his career as a commentator at WWC. To promote the event, the WWC arranged for González to be interviewed in Salsoul. It also participated in charity visits during the Dia del Fanatico. In May, WWC held a press conference and announced the card and notified that besides The Colóns, MVP and Umaga would be at Aniversario. After being released from TNA, Sewell confirmed his fulltime return to WWC. In June WWC announced several more promotional stunts, including a pre-event party and the integration of former boxing world champion Félix Trinidad to serve as referee of the main event. The promotion also contracted former IWA commenter, Axel Cruz. Prior to Aniversario, WWC announced a recess, the involvement of several media personalities and the incorporation of more talent, including Stacy Brooks, ODB, Figueroa and Ken Anderson, to the event. WWC aired promos filmed at the WWE offices and TNA's Impact Zone.

In July, WWC continued their widespread promotional tour, despite suffering the loss of MVP. In the process, the IWA booked OBD to a future date despite her scheduled appearance at WWC, airing a promo segment. The promotion also held a pre-event party. WWC filmed Aniversario 2009 with the intent of turning it into a DVD narrated by Savinovich and Carlos Cabrera, WWE's Spanish commentators. At the event, Savinovich announced that he would produce the following two Aniversarios. However, the surprise appearance of Noriega upset Corino, who felt that months of pushing BJ had been damaged and left the promotion. During this time, the promotion also signed Ricky Steamboat Jr., who debuted on July 24, 2009. Following Aniversario 2009, the promotion reintroduced a revamped website. For Summer Madness, WWC brought Ricky Steamboat, Sr. to team with his son.

Following a hiatus during which a series of WWE house shows were held in Puerto Rico, the promotion was forced to cancel an event and reorganize their schedule. Prior to Septiembre Negro, the promotion made moves in its roster to incorporate former IWA World Heavyweight Champion Bison Smith, but his debut was delayed due to a Japan tour. The relationship between WWC and Trinidad became strained prior to Halloween Wrestling Xtravaganza 2009, removing him from scheduled appearances. Plans made for a match between the boxer and Orlando Colón were dropped when he decided not to wrestle. WWC opted to close the 2009 season early with a Crossfire PPV, for which they introduced new HD cameras. Despite this, a show called "WWC goes to St. Thomas" was scheduled to take place in the Virgin Islands during the offseason.

=== Savio Vega and legal battle with IWA-PR ===
After recovering Bryan, WWC began promoting the "unimaginable", later revealed to be the debut of Ricky Banderas for the promotion. The arrival marked the latest in a series of attempts to take the wrestler away from the IWA, and served to set a match against Carly Colón to open the 2010 season. It was later revealed that the negotiations had been carried out by Hugo Savinovich. AAA promoted the move in Mexico.

In December the promotion made a series of moves, enrolling new editor Alberto Rodriguez and the signing of Mr. Kennedy for the Euphoria show to be held at the Coliseum of Puerto Rico. After WWC spoiled that Sewell had left to join to join the IWA and make a surprise appearance at Christmas in PR, they responded by filing a lawsuit prohibiting the use of the character of "Ricky Banderas" and forcing the use of "El Triple Mega Campeon" as replacement. WWC's own Gorbea refute the content of the press release, becoming involved in a public dispute with BJ. During the offseason, WWC loaned talents Diaz and Gorbea as well as referee Angel Fashion, to independent promotion NPW. During the offseason, the promotion loaned talent to be used in the season closer of independent promotions HWR and CWF.

On January 9, 2010, it was reported that WWE had released Pain. WWC made moves to secure his return to the promotion, later announcing his return as well as Laureano's. To promote the arrival of Banderas, WWC once again recurred to promoting itself on Wapa, appearing in Logrono's show Sunshine Remix along González. The promotion contracted Eric Perez as soon as he was released from his WWE contract.

In February 2010, WWC declared the Women's Championship vacant due to failure to defend and inactivated the division citing a lack of female talent. As Orlando Colón left for WWE, WWC incorporated Scott Steiner to its roster. In March, WWC cancelled a card without previous notification and reactivated the female division. Savinovich produced Aniversario 2010, while the previous event was released in DVD. In April 2010, WWC continued cancelling events. Though it brought several foreign stars such as Steiner and Shelton Benjamin for Aniversario, WWC lost Carlito following his release from WWE. Weather conditions also led to the cancellation of another card. Afterwards, they backtracked on removing Carlito from Aniversario, which was dedicated to Pedro Castillo. As Aniversario approached, more talent was added, and rumors swirled that IWA owner Savio Vega would appear in the event. Prior to the event, WWC brought Ricky Banderas as referee and switched Katie Lee Burchill for OBD due to visa issues. The approaches to Vega eventually concluded in a skit where he appeared alongside Carlos Colón in a television show insulting Carlito. This angle was well received, receiving an approval of 64% among polled wrestling fans. IWA emphasized it in its programming, while WWC did not. Ultimately, the angle was abandoned before Aniversario. Afterwards, several matches were confirmed for the event. A documentary of WWC's history was announced by Wrestling Observer Shoots. In July 2010, WWC returned to Trinidad and Tobago in an event that featured Victor Jovica's retirement match. It also held conversations with the intention of hosting more frequent, likely monthly, events in the region. For Aniversario, WWC brought Booker T. Afterwards, WWC lost Idol Stevens to WWE. A return to Trinidad and Tobago was announced for October. In August, WWC continued having issues with the cancellation of events. Hugo Savinovich continued with an on-screen role. WWC had issues being forced to move venues, while its show did not go to air due to weather conditions. In August 2010, WWC moved its headquarters from Santurce to Hato Rey, also in San Juan. With Carlos Colón promoting WWE, he held contests in conjunction with WWC. WWC brought in DWE president Rico Casanova, emphasizing the role and launching an interpromotional angle. WWC promoted a match between Eddie Colón and Hideo Saito as an interpromotional, WWE vs. NJPW, encounter. As IWA claimed ownership of the character of "El Mesias" Ricky Banderas, WWC billed the wrestler as "El Hombre que ellos llaman El Mesías Ricky Banderas" and "El Mega Campeón". The public perception of WWC's product improved during this year. For Euphoria 2011, WWC continued relying on former WWE wrestlers and brought MVP.

During this time frame Superestrellas de la Lucha Libre consisted of airing taped matches, Lo que Está Pasando hosted by Alejandro Rodil, El Wizard Analiza and Clásicos de la Lucha Libre. However, WWC made some changes and introduced a new section named La Opinión de Gilbert, which temporarily replaced El Wizard Analiza. José Herrera and Abel Durant were featured in recurrent roles along Montesinos and Rodil. Jerry Rodríguez also had a recurrent role as a narrator and occasional host of Lo Que Está Pasando.

The promotion resumed its work with charity and held tryouts.

=== La Invasión and derivative angles ===
Prior to Aniversario, WWC promoted in the mainstream media including NotiUNO. It was, however, forced to cancel a card when its truck failed. WWC supplemented the card with TNA knockout Sarita, longstanding TNA talent Abyss and exWWE Chavo Guerrero. One of the cards was moved due to a scheduling conflict with the BSN. Steve Corino was announced, but his appearance was cancelled. Days before the celebration of the event, WWC began teasing about an "explosive" storyline. Savio Vega initially denied the implication that he was involved. Instead, as references were made to IWA in Superestrellas de la Lucha Libre, Thunder and Lightning appeared. Vega once again denied that the "invasion" was going on. Despite this, both sides continued in negotiations and ultimately reached an agreement late in the final week, with Vega appearing in Superestrellas de la Lucha Libre. Thunder and Lightning remained the storyline representatives of IWA in WWC. IWA hyped the arrival of WWC wrestlers to Summer Attitude, mentioning Carlito. The angle was well received by the wrestling fans of Puerto Rico. Vega mentioned that both Miguel Pérez and Victor Jovica opposed to the idea, though he stated that Perez later warmed up to it. Four chairs were reserved for IWA the first night of Aniversario 2011, with Thunder and Lightning hinting that they were not alone. The main night of Aniversario, Los Fujitivos wrestled Thunder and Lightning to a no contest in a match were two referees, representing WWC and IWA, counted at the same time. Afterwards, Savio Vega accompanied by a host of IWA wrestlers including Dennis Rivera, Noel Rodiguez, Spectro, Hiram Tua and Carlos Cotto attacked them. He insulted Shane Sewell, Mr. Big and Blitz due to their association with WWC at the moment and insulted Carlito. At IWA Summer Attitude, Gilbert interrupted an homage to Victor Quiñones, prompting a confrontation with Savio Vega. He was backed by WWC wrestlers Díaz, Los Rabiosos, Los Fujitivos and Shane Sewell. The invading team was repelled by the IWA-PR roster, but accepted a challenge issued by Vega. WWC recorded the intervention. WWC aired footage of the intervention of its wrestlers at Summer Attitude. Colón answered the insults thrown at him by Savio Vega in Superestrellas de la Lucha Libre. WWC cancelled a card due to weather conditions. The collaboration was cancelled when both promotions failed to reach an economic agreement. A tropical storm led to another cancelled card. WWC gave its side of the cancellation in its programming.

Despite the failure of the collaboration, Los Dueños de la Malicia appeared in Superestrellas and challenged Los Fujitivos for the WWC World Tag Team Championship. At Septiembre Negro they won the match, immediately leaving the venue afterwards. WWC used the commission as a plot device to declare the titles held up, reaffirming the posture later in Superestrellas de la Lucha Libre. Despite refusing to return the belts to WWC, when interviewed by mainstream media outlet NotiCel Los Dueños de la Malicia assured that they "had not stolen anything" and were the legitimate champions per the rules of professional wrestling. The report also noted that the actions that followed the event were not part of a storyline. WWC later changed the official result of the match through the commissioners, declaring it null and declared that Los Fujitivos remained champions. For Halloween Wrestling Xtravaganza, WWC brought Blue Demon Jr. In its programming, El Wizard Analiza returned to coexist along La Opinión de Gilbert. Alejandro Rodil returned to host Lo que esta pasando en WWC. Savio Vega reappeared in WWC, challenging Carlito both in Superestrellas de la Lucha Libre and Euphoria. Afterwards, Carlito answered. They cancelled a card in February. WWC once again relied on Primo and Epico, exWWE talent for Aniversario and brought Banderas and ROH World Heavyweight Champion Davey Richards. In April, the promotion cancelled another card citing weather conditions. The pattern continued in May, when it cancelled a card due to low turnout. One of its referees died. As IWA-PR entered a prolonged hiatus, WWC brought Andy Levine and Wes Brisco to spend a season in the company. In October 2012, JBL claimed during a WWE show that Carlos Colón owed him money. In March 2013, WWC debuted new belts commissioned to Top Rope. The promotion cancelled a card at Mayagüez due to low attendance. Towards the end of the year, WWC experienced some instability in its roster, with three wrestlers leaving, Gilbert initially announcing that he was leaving and Ricky Banderas being replaced for Euphoria. On April 16, 2014, World Wrestling Council, Inc. was revoked as the underlying corporation for the brand. An identically named entity being registered on March 3, 2015.

=== Fallout of hurricane Maria (2017–2019) ===
Following the passing of Hurricane Maria over Puerto Rico, the WWC headquarters lost power for a prolonged time period due to infrastructure damage. In response, the promotion issued licenses to some of its wrestlers to participate in the local independent scene, barring some creative limitations that prevented them from being booked in clean defeats. As of December 2017, WWC's one-hour weekend shows on WAPA-TV continued to rerun the last several episodes produced prior to Maria. Almost five months after the hurricane, WWC confirmed its return with new episodes of the weekend shows (consisting of newly recorded commentary and interview segments mixed with repeats of high-profile matches) leading up to a new live event on March 3, 2018. For Aniversario, the promotion announced Jake Swagger, Del Rio and the Briscoes. Still relying on foreign talent, WWC announced Mark Henry for Septiembre Negro, but later retracted the name as the card underwent several changes including the absence of an announced Eddie Colón. In November 2018, it was reported that WWC had finalized the sale of its video library to WWE.

On July 23, 2018, longtime talent Ramón Álvarez (a.k.a. El Bronco No. 1) and Engel Landolfi unveiled a spinoff based in the Dominican Republic, WWC DR, receiving the support of Colón and Jovica (who loaned both the trade name and logo for use). Its first event was scheduled for October 28, 2018, featuring talent from both WWC (such as Carlito, Gilbert, Thunder and Lightning) and local competitor WWL (Superstar Ash, Ángel Fashion and Vanilla Vargas).

In November 2018, WWE acquired the WWC video library.

=== IWA-PR, pandemic and LAWE (2019–2021) ===
While still part of WWE's roster (yet inactive), Eddie and Orlando Colón returned to WWC, working in both administrative roles and as in-ring talent in 2019. Ray González was brought back in and placed in a creative role that was described onscreen as Director of Operations. As the new administration became more involved backstage, WWC introduced elements to its product, including a new logo. In February 2020, WWC and IWA-PR began a second inter-promotional angle, which featured Savio Vega and Ray González "crossing the line" and appearing in the other promotion.

On February 13, 2020, a video where Ray González extended an invitation to Savio Vega (now acting as president of the IWA-PR after it emerged from a hiatus in 2018) to attend a WWC to present him with a proposal that would be mutually beneficial was posted in the IWA-PR's social media platforms. After some anticipation, the summon was accepted in a subsequent segment aired in Superestrellas de la Lucha Libre. On February 15, 2020, Vega accepted a copy of the document from González and informed that he would give his final answer at the IWA-PR event Histeria Boricua 2020. During this skit, the heel faction known as Legacy (composed by Eddie Colón, Gilbert and Peter John Ramos) were placed in antagonism to the agreement.

During the pandemic, WWC had scant activity and was forced to cancel joint event Alianza Letal. They aired Aniversario to cope with the lack of new material. In the summer of 2020 the promotion announced its intention to return to hosting cards, which didn't happen due to government restrictions. Instead, the promotion began filming in a public-less venue, filming Cuentas Pendientes which was originally intended as an iPPV but was ultimately used to fill the gap in programming. The collaboration with IWA-PR concluded in June 2021 when, according to Vega, WWC stopped answering his calls.

In March 2021 a promotion named Latin American Wrestling Entertainment (LAWE) was inscribed in the Puerto Rico Department of State with Eddie Colón as its president. In June Mike Chioda publicly revealed his involvement in the project. It officially launched in July, with Stacy Colón as its onscreen CEO. LAWE began announcing the signing of several wrestlers, among who was the incumbent Universal Heavyweight Champion Gilbert. The Colón cousins were also part of these roster additions. WWC avoided updating its status, but their YouTube channel was emptied and its official Facebook page was repurposed by former narrator Antonio "Tony" Montesinos. LAWE had a separate structure, including social media presence.

On August 25, 2021, it was reported that the Colóns intended a merger by purchasing the shares owned by Victor Jovica. When negotiations failed to reach and agreement, all but Orlando and José Colón left LAWE. On August 30, 2021, WWC announced that it would resume the organization of events led by Carlos Colón, González and Jovica. Ultimately, Orlando remained operating LAWE. The promotion made its return card on March. A rise in COVID-19 cases due to variants and government restrictions forced WWC to cancel Aniversario 2021. Still plagued by low attendance and instability, WWC brought Ric Flair and his son-in-law Andrade for Aniversario 2022.

=== 50th anniversary (2023) ===
By reaching its quinquagenarian year of existence in 2023, WWC became the eighth promotion in the world to operate continuously for that amount of time after Consejo Mundial de Lucha Libre (established in 1933), the NWA (1948), WWE (1953), ECWA (1967) All Star Wrestling in the United Kingdom (1970), New Japan Pro Wrestling (1972) and All Japan Pro Wrestling (1972). The promotion began analyzing the possibility of expanding operations to the state of Florida, where a large Puerto Rican fanbase continues to grow. As Aniversario 50 approached, WWC brought back José Roberto Rodríguez and Hugo Savinovich as backstage staff working on production.

== Roster ==
Ring name	Notes
Ray González	
Xavant	WWC Caribbean Heavyweight Champion / WWC Puerto Rico Champion
Intelecto 5 Estrellas	WWC Universal Heavyweight Champion
Chicano	
Eddie Colón	director of operations / occasional wrestler
Gilbert	
Mike Nice	
Lightning	WWC World Tag Team Champion
[[]]	WWC Junior Heavyweight Champion
JC Jexx	
Jovan	
Diego Luna	
El Informante	
El Payaso Makabro	
Amadeo Sole	
John Hawkins	
Tony Leyenda	
Zcion RT1	WWC Television Champion
La Amenaza Brian	
Julio Jimenez	
Brandon The Skater	
[[]]	tag-team
Los Inmortales	tag-team
Amazona	
Stephanie Amalbert	
Elena Negroni	

=== Others ===
Ring name	Notes
Abel Durant	Main commentator
Axel Cruz	Color commentator
Michael Morales Torres	Color commentator

=== Referees ===
Ring name	Notes
Cesar Artache	
Stephan Alers	
Pelayo Vázquez	
José Rosa	
Windy Sáez	
Francisco Montalvo	

== Recurrent events ==
Event name	Last held	Location
WWC Euphoria	January 11, 2025	Bayamón, Puerto Rico
WWC Camino a la Gloria	March 31, 2018 – April 1, 2018	Manatí – Mayagüez, Puerto Rico
WWC La Hora de la Verdad	March 11, 2023	Mayaguez, Puerto Rico
WWC Noche De Campeones	November 23, 2019	Bayamón, Puerto Rico
WWC Summer Madness	May 21, 2022	Manatí, Puerto Rico
WWC Aniversario	August 6, 2022	Bayamón, Puerto Rico
WWC Septiembre Negro	September 10, 2022	Guaynabo, Puerto Rico
WWC Halloween Wrestling Extravaganza	November 3, 2018	Guaynabo, Puerto Rico
WWC Lockout	December 7, 2019	Bayamón, Puerto Rico

== Championships ==
=== Current ===
Championship	Current champion(s)	Reign	Date won	Days held	Location
WWC Universal Heavyweight Championship	Zcion RT1	1	June 27, 2026	225	San Juan, Puerto Rico
WWC Puerto Rico Championship	Mike Nice	2	October 24, 2026	1	Bayamón, Puerto Rico
WWC World Tag Team Championship	Los Inmortales	3	October 24, 2026	1	Bayamón, Puerto Rico
WWC Television Championship	La Amenaza Bryan	1	September 26, 2026	162	Bayamón,Puerto Rico
WWC World Junior Heavyweight Championship	Jovan	4	September 26, 2026	316	Bayamon, Puerto Rico
WWC Caribbean Heavyweight Championship	Intelecto 5 Estrellas	1	August 29, 2026	225	Bayamón, Puerto Rico
WWC Women's Championship	Sai Pérez	1	August 29, 2026	162	Bayamón, Puerto Rico

=== Defunct and inactive ===
Championship:	Final champion(s):	Date won:	Notes:
TTWA World Heavyweight Championship	Bobo Brazil	May 6, 1984	June 10, 1984 (When TTWA breaks affiliation with WWC)
TTWA World Tag Team Championship	Abdullah The Butcher & The Sheik	December 2, 1983	June 10, 1984 (When TTWA breaks affiliation with WWC)
WWC North American Heavyweight Championship	Fidel Sierra	November 28, 1992	Abandoned February 14, 1992
WWC North American Tag Team Championship	The Hunters (Bob Brown (wrestler) and Dale Veasey)	June 20, 1987	Abandoned July 2, 1987
NWA Latin American Heavyweight Championship	El Bronco	February 8, 1990	Abandoned June 10, 1990 (This title was created for an interpromotional show on Dominican Republic with DWF vs WWC was billed to Huracan Castillo and then lost against Bronco on DR)
WWC Caribbean Tag Team Championship	Los Nenes de las Nenas (Ray Gonzalez and Ricky Santana)	September 28, 1991	Abandoned September 29, 1991
WWC Intercontinental Heavyweight Championship	Pierroth, Jr.	April 3, 1999	Abandoned December 13, 1999
WWC Dominican Republic Heavyweight Championship	El Bronco	September 22, 2001	Abandoned 2001
WWC Hardcore Championship	Rico Suave	March 13, 2004	Abandoned Abril 17, 2004

== See also ==
- Professional wrestling in Puerto Rico
- List of professional wrestling promotions
