= IWA Undisputed World Heavyweight Championship (Puerto Rico) =

IWA (Undisputed) World Championship -Puerto Rico
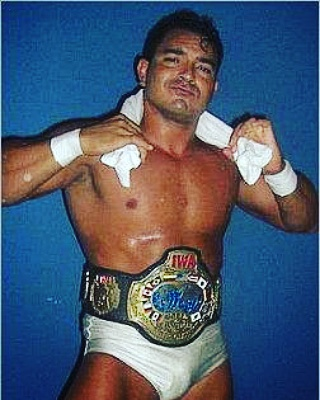
- Joe Bravo with the original IWA World Heavyweight Championship

Details
- Promotion: International Wrestling Association; International Wrestling Entertainment (storyline company)
- Date established: 2000
- Current champion: El Dragón Nihan
- Date won: August 8, 2026

Other names
- IWA World (Heavyweight) Championship (2000–2008, 2018-present); IWA Undisputed World Unified Heavyweight Championship (2007-2008); IWA Undisputed World (Heavyweight) Championship (2008–2012, 2022–present; (named used in addition as referenced in IWA's website since the November 19, 2022 IWA/IWE title Unification); IWE World Heavyweight Championship (2021-2022, during the IWAvsIWE title dispute storyline)
Statistics
- Most reigns: Glamour Boy Shane (10 reigns)
- Longest reign: Mr. Big (609 days)
- Shortest reign: Jay-Cobs (Less than 1 day)
- Oldest champion: Invader #1 (76 Years)
- Youngest champion: Electro (22 years)

The IWA (Undisputed) World Championship is a professional wrestling world championship that is contested in the International Wrestling Association's main branch at Puerto Rico. Besides its base jurisdiction, the title has also been defended within the international circuit and interpromotially at Frontier Martial-Arts Wrestling (Japan) and Revolution X-treme Wrestling (Panama).

The championship was established in 2000, changing its name eight years later to reflect the status of undisputed championship that the National Wrestling Alliance recognized following a controversial "unification" match where (another title born with the NWA as sanctioning body) the WWC Universal Heavyweight Championship was purportedly on the line. When reintroduced in 2018, this distinction had been dropped from the name.

In 2021, Fernando Tonos and Manny Ferno created a group known as La Alianza IWE with the intention of completing a hostile takeover on behalf of International Wrestling Entertainment. Members of the stable won all of the IWA-PR titles. In response, general manager Chicky Starr and Savio Vega introduced parallel titles for each division in March 2022. While the storyline continued, there was a pair of belts contested independently of each other, with the original being referenced to as the "IWE World Heavyweight Championship". On November 19, 2022, John Hawking defeated Mr. Big to unify both titles, reintroducing the name "IWA Undisputed World (Heavyweight) Championship".

== History ==
=== Unification with the "Capitol World Heavyweight Championship" ===
On December 15, 2007, Scott Hall failed to attend a titular defense which led to the fictional local boxing and wrestling commission's decision to vacate the WWC Universal Heavyweight Championship and award it to the number one contender who at the moment was Miguel "Biggie Size" Maldonado. On December 30, the Universal Heavyweight Championship was declared vacant following the events where he was declared the champion following Hall's absence to Lockout. The commission's decision was announced during the company's holiday recess and Maldonado retained the championship belt in custody.

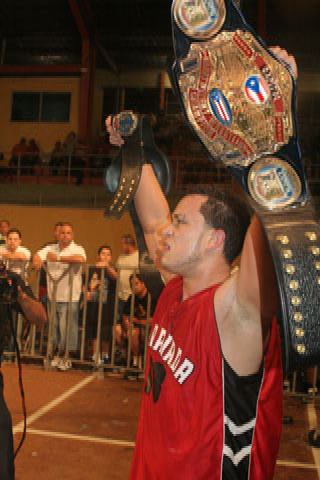
Blitz holds the championships, with the "Capitol Heavyweight Championship" on the foreground

On January 6, 2008, Jack Meléndez who had been managing La Rabia, the stable where he performed abandoned the company citing differences with the company's personnel. Following Meléndez's exit from the company the stable abandoned the company no-showing the a special event scheduled for January 6, 2008. On January 6, Maldonado appeared in the IWA's Histeria Boricua event, with the championship belt still in his possession and challenged Freddie "Blitz" Lozada, who was the IWA World Heavyweight Champion to a unification match. The match took place later in the event with Lozada winning both belts. Following this match WWC's merchandising manager, José Roberto Rodríguez, who had been allowed entry into the building, demanded that the belt was returned to him, but at the moment the IWA's personnel had replaced the belt with Revolution X-Treme Wrestling's championship belt (at the moment in Savio Vega's possession) and had transferred the Universal Heavyweight Championship to a secure location, which led to a discussion between personnel from both companies and Rodríguez's expulsion from the event. After the event's conclusion police officers were deployed and the IWA retained physical possession of the championship. Following this the belt was returned to WWC personnel following an ultimatum, which claimed that the company would take legal action if it wasn't returned within forty-eight hours. However, both the International Wrestling Association and the National Wrestling Alliance recognized the unification match, and considered Lozada the first Undisputed World Heavyweight Champion in Puerto Rico.

=== International exposure ===
Beginning in 2009, the IWA Undisputed World Unified Heavyweight Championship began becoming involved in several inter-promotional "champion vs. champion" contests. The first of these took place on January 6, 2009, where Carlos "Chicano" Cotto was booked to defend the title against Total Nonstop Action Wrestling's Legends Champion, Booker T. The contest was part of an annual event titled "Histeria Boricua". The conclusion came when Cotto inverted a "Book End" attempt, scoring a pinfall victory. On February 14, 2009, the promotion held a special event named "Noche de Campeónes". In this card, Cotto defended the championship against Samoa Joe. During the final stages of the fight, Noel Rodríguez intervened, injuring the referee. Both wrestlers continued performing, with Cotto scoring a pinfall victory after reverting a finisher and receiving the count from a substitute referee. On April 18, 2009, Cotto was challenged to an unification contest by Joe Bravo, who held the DWE Dominican National Championship, the major title of Dominican Wrestling Entertainment based in the Dominican Republic. Bravo won with the help of a heel referee, becoming a dual champion. The next titleholder to challenge for the belt was Jerry Lynn, Ring of Honor's World Champion, who unsuccessfully competed against Bravo and Chicano in a three-way match. This was part of the "Juicio Final 2009" card. On May 29, 2009, Bravo defended the IWA and DWE championships in Panama, defeating El Cuervo as part of a Revolution X-Treme Wrestling card. On November 1, 2009, Bravo and the incumbent WWC Universal Heavyweight Champion, Shane Sewell, performed in a DWE event, with the DWE Dominican National Championship being held up after the creative team booked a no contest. This marked the first instance that the two major champions worked together while holding full recognitions by both promotions.

=== IWA vs. EWO, Clash of the Titans ===
At Summer Attitude 2011, Chris Angel defeated Hiram Tua to become the first undefeated Undisputed World Champion. He went on to defeat all contenders, one of them being Cotto, who was subsequently fired by Pérez after questioning his involvement in a match between both. This event launched a storyline between the IWA and the Extreme Wrestling Organization, the largest independent company and de facto third main promotion in Puerto Rico. On December 17, 2011, Cotto won the EWO Championship, only to be interrupted by Pérez. This was in response to a previous confrontation between both, that occurred following an unrelated charity card. After defending the title at Tierra de Nadie 2012, Pérez once again reclaimed his contract. At Histeria Boricua, Angel was absent for a scheduled defense due to a storyline injury, which resulted in the title being stripped from him. The interim General Manager went on to proclaim himself champion, issuing an open challenge which was accepted by EWO's first contender, a masked wrestler known only as "Bonecrusher", who won it Ina squash match. The confrontations between Cotto and Pérez continued in two of IWA's events expanding to include EWO's CEO, Richard Rondón, as well. On February 25, 2012, following more intervention from the IWA, Cotto issued a challenge to end the conflict, an unification match for the EWO Championship and IWA Undisputed World Heavyweight Championship. On March 1, 2012, the challenge was accepted by Pérez and Rondón in a backstage segment. At Clash of the Titans, Bonecrusher defeated Cotto, becoming Unified Champion. In 2012, IWA folded, so the title was vacated.

During the following years, the Undisputed World Heavyweight Championship made appearances in a number of unrelated media. In early 2015, while Vega was part of La Radio PR's Más Allá del Ring show, the title made appearances as part of the studio's decore along the Intercontinental and World Tag Team Championships. In autumn, the IWA Undisputed World Heavyweight Championship was taken to New York during Amaro Productions' La Guerra 2 event. In an interview published on October 22, 2015, wrestling journalist Joel Torres reunited Ricky Banderas with the belt, with the wrestler reminiscing about winning it in Juicio Final 2001 and emphasized on the history that the title had. The title was also featured at the 2016 WrestleCon held at Dallas, with Vega posing with it in fan requests and while being reunited with Miguel Pérez.

=== Revival, pandemic hiatus (2019–2021) ===
The title was formally reactivated on April 20, 2018, initially scheduled to be contested in a charity card held in benefit of Gustavo Rodríguez, a former member of the IWA's ring crew and Hardcore Champion. The contenders were to be elected by Savio Vega and Miguel Pérez, with the former choosing Monster Pain as his representative. Hours later, the return of the IWA was teased as part of World Wrestling League's (up to that point the promotion's spiritual successor) version of Juicio Final. However, internal differences within the interpromotional event lead to the cancellation of the Luchando por Gustavo titular match the following day, leaving the title vacant. The IWA trademark was formally reintroduced on May 6, 2018. The Undisputed World Heavyweight Championship (along the Intercontinental and World Tag Team belts) was featured in the promotion for Golpe de Estado 2018, where the main storyline revolved around Vega's intention of renaming WWL.

Vega carried the belt with him at Golpe de Estado, and in subsequent charity events. On July 20, 2018, a relaunch of IWA's Florida spinoff was also announced, along a tournament to fill the vacancies for the Undisputed World Heavyweight and World Tag Team Championships. However, the formal reactivation of IWA-PR led to the reassignment for the second date of Impacto Total: El Tour, where it would be disputed in a four-way match. On its part, IWA Florida received its own version of the Heavyweight Championship (which kept the original design minus minor alterations and not making a claim of "world" status) which longtime rival headliner Carly Colón appropriated following a match with Mechawolf 450 as part of Histeria Boricua 2019.

The crowning of a new champion became part of the return tour's main storyline. First in a segment where Savio Vega noted that it was his dream to restage the ambienance of October 28, 2000. This led to Director of Talent Relations, Dennis Rivera, granting the Puro Macho stable leader, Manny Ferno, the opportunity to elect only one of its members for a place in the titular match (intending to create division in retribution for the WWL feud). The latter would meet with Mr. Big, who had served a mercenary role for the faction and requested the reassurance that he would not be joining his old IWA team of Los Rabiosos, only to receive a demand for a title shot in exchange for allegiance. Savio Vega was noted to be skeptical of allowing Puro Macho a chance to gather influence within the promotion, but was reassured by Rivera that the ambitions would create irreparable damage. Meanwhile, members of Puro Macho Electro and Khriz "The Chosen" held a meeting in which the former noted his interest in the accolade, later informing Ferno of this stance.

Shane Sewell was the first contender announced, but resigned his place to Mr. Big, betting that he still remained loyal to the IWA. Former champions Ricky Banderas and Apolo were announced as the other two. Ultimately, Ferno acknowledged that the decision would be problematic and refused to elect a member, allowing Rivera to choose Electro in his stead. As the youngest of the group the latter would emerge victorious, continuing the IWA's philosophy of building a "new generation" with the collaboration of veterans. After CWA World Heavyweight Champion Noel Rodríguez made an appearance and issued a challenge at Vendetta, Electro had a defense against him in that promotion's Sabotaje event.

After being given the title for the first time in 14 years, Mikael Judas started defending it abroad, beginning with a successful defense at Tennessee. Another appearance for Continental Championship Wrestling of Georgia, in which he was announced as the "Puerto Rico World Champion". On November 30, 2019, Mr. Big defeated Judas at Hardcore Weekend. Benefited by the COVID-19 pandemic, he entered the longest reign of any wrestler, scoring a number of defenses that aired in events without public.

=== Major League Wrestling and IWE Takeover (2021–present) ===
On July 31, 2021, former Caribbean Heavyweight Champion and Major League Wrestling (MLW) regular Richard Holliday made his debut for IWA-PR by defeating Mr. Big for the World Heavyweight Championship. After some titles changes, Fernando Tonos reveal he got in his power a book property of Victor Quiñones with "work plans" using it to create the IWE and take control of all titles with intentions of close IWA and renamed. After Juicio Final 2022, the company got 2 champions on all divisions due to controversy between IWE & IWA.

== Belt design ==
The IWA World Heavyweight Championship belt originally consisted of five gilded circular plaques placed on a black belt. The main plate featured a mapamundi at the center, flanged by eleven flags (Puerto Rico, Japan, Brazil, Canada, Australia, Colombia, Italy, South Korea, Mexico, United States and the Pan-African flag) and the words "World Heavyweight Wrestling Champion", and "IWA" prominently at the crown. The interior set of side plaques depict wrestlers grappling and the outside set is dominated by another, single-circle, world map. All of the secondary plates are crowned by the corporate acronym. The piece was crafted and designed by Reggie Parks, who had manufactured titles for the World Wrestling Federation (WWF, now known as WWE) and other international companies.

Its original colors included light-blue on the globes and black on the company acronym. In subsequent retouches, the underlying chrome base was evident, the blue coloration was darkened, "IWA" was recolored red throughout, the Pan-African flag was changed twice (first to that of Venezuela and later Germany) and the flag of Italy was switched with France's. In 2018, Collection Spot was commissioned to restore the IWA World Heavyweight Championship, adding to the work previously done by Rolando Martínez. Besides retouching the colors, reinstating the Italian flag and restoring the black to "IWA" throughout, the process involved adding gold to the mantling of the plates and painting their studs blue.

In 2022, IWA-PR commissioned new belts for all divisions from Collection Spot as part of revamp for its 20th anniversary. The IWA World Heavyweight Championship retained the original Reggie Parks design, but was enlarged and the blue shade of the mapamundi reverted to a lighter shade of blue. Instead of being etched intaglio as in the original design, the "IWA" logo is now flat and silver-colored. Meanwhile, the original belt was repurposed as the IWE World Heavyweight Championship with a sticker of the stable’s logo being placed over the "IWA" in the crown of the center plate.

== Title history ==
Indicates disputed IWA/IWE champions.
Indicates title reigns and changes not recognized by IWA or vacancies.

Highlights in bold denotes after Juicio Final 2022 each division have 2 champions due by the controversy between IWA and IWE, in which the latter took control of the old titles forcing IWA to create new titles in each division

#	Wrestler:	Times:	Date:	Days held	Place:	Event:	Notes:	Ref.
1	Glamour Boy Shane	1	October 28, 2000	105	Bayamón, Puerto Rico	IWA TV Taping	Defeated Ricky Banderas, Apolo and Miguel Perez Jr. in a Tournament Final.	
2	Ricky Banderas	1	February 10, 2001	56	Bayamón, Puerto Rico	Zona Caliente		
3	Glamour Boy Shane	2	April 7, 2001	14	Bayamón, Puerto Rico	Juicio Final (2001)	Won the title in a Ladder Match.	
4	Ricky Banderas	2	April 21, 2001	56	Gurabo, Puerto Rico	Impacto Total	No-DQ Match	
5	Gran Apolo	1	May 8, 2001	144	Cataño, Puerto Rico	IWA TV Taping	Won the Title in a Cage Match.	
6	Pain	1	September 29, 2001	21	Bayamón, Puerto Rico			
7	Glamour Boy Shane	3	October 20, 2001	7	Carolina, Puerto Rico	Zona Caliente		
8	Gran Apolo	2	October 27, 2001	42	Bayamón, Puerto Rico			
	Vacant		December 8, 2001	84	Orocovis, Puerto Rico		Stripped by the company's General Manager, Savio Vega after a match between Apolo and Shane the Glamour Boy.	
9	Primo Carnero	1	March 2, 2002	0	Bayamón, Puerto Rico		Defeated Nuevo Gran Apolo.	
10	Savio Vega	1	March 2, 2002	42	Bayamón, Puerto Rico		Given the title by Carnero after the match.	
11	Gran Apolo	3	April 13, 2002	14	Bayamón, Puerto Rico			
12	Primo Carnero	2	April 27, 2002	15	Levittown, Puerto Rico			
13	Apolo	4	May 12, 2002	6	Bayamón, Puerto Rico	Armagedon (2002)		
14	Primo Carnero	3	May 18, 2002	28	Caguas, Puerto Rico	IWA TV Taping	Chain Match.	
15	Ricky Banderas	3	June 15, 2002	91	Bayamón, Puerto Rico			
16	Rey Fénix	1	September 14, 2002	56	Carolina, Puerto Rico	Golpe de Estado (2002)	It rained heavily on Carolina during the event.	
17	Apolo	5	November 9, 2002	58	Cayey, Puerto Rico	IWA TV Taping		
18	Ricky Banderas	4	January 6, 2003	89	Carolina, Puerto Rico	Histeria Boricua (2003)		
19	Ray González	2	April 5, 2003	105	Bayamón, Puerto Rico	Juicio Final (2003)		
20	Apolo	6	July 19, 2003	63	Bayamón, Puerto Rico	IWA TV Taping		
21	Glamour Boy Shane	4	September 20, 2003	42	Bayamón, Puerto Rico	IWA TV Taping		
22	Bison Smith	1	November 1, 2003	28	Bayamón, Puerto Rico	IWA TV Taping	Baseball Bat hanging over 15' Air Match.	
	Vacant		November 29, 2003	14	Carolina, Puerto Rico	Hardcore Weekend (2003)	Title was held up after a match between Bison and Glamour Boy Shane.	
23	Glamour Boy Shane	5	December 13, 2003	24	Bayamón, Puerto Rico	Christmas in PR (2003)	Won the rematch against Bison.	
24	Humongous	1	January 6, 2004	32	Bayamón, Puerto Rico	Histeria Boricua (2004)		
	Vacant		February 7, 2004	7	Caguas, Puerto Rico	IWA TV Taping	When Humongous no showed the title was held up after a match between Bison Smith and Glamour Boy Shane.	
25	Glamour Boy Shane	6	February 14, 2004	21	Bayamón, Puerto Rico	IWA TV Taping		
	Vacant		March 6, 2004	0	Carolina, Puerto Rico	IWA TV Taping	GM Jose Chaparro stripped Shane of the title because they didn't get an economic deal with him.	
26	Ray González	3	March 6, 2004	182	Carolina, Puerto Rico	IWA TV Taping	Won the vacant title against Apolo.	
27	"El Leon" Apolo	7	September 4, 2004	84	Bayamón, Puerto Rico	IWA TV Taping		
28	Ray González	4	November 27, 2004	21	Bayamón, Puerto Rico	Hardcore Weekend (2004)		
29	Glamour Boy Shane	7	December 18, 2004	56	Bayamón, Puerto Rico	Christmas in PR (2004)		
30	Ricky Banderas	5	February 12, 2005	7	Caguas, Puerto Rico	IWA TV Taping		
	Vacant		February 19, 2005	8	Caguas, Puerto Rico	IWA TV Taping	Title was held-up after the match between Glamour Boy Shane and Ricky Banderas.	
31	Glamour Boy Shane	8	February 27, 2005	48	Caguas, Puerto Rico	IWA TV Taping	Defeated Banderas in a rematch.	
32	Chicano	1	April 16, 2005	42	Caguas, Puerto Rico	Juicio Final V		
	Vacant		May 28, 2005	14	Levittown, Puerto Rico	IWA TV Taping	Cruz was the first contender but got injured so Shane replaced him but Title was held up after the match between Chicano ended as no contest.	
33	Chicano	2	June 11, 2005	70	Toa Baja, Puerto Rico	IWA TV Taping	Won the rematch against Glamour Boy Shane in a Ladder match.	
34	Slash Venom	1	August 20, 2005	42	Aguas Buenas, Puerto Rico			
35	Chicano	3	October 1, 2005	41	Carolina, Puerto Rico		Won the title in a Fatal 4-Way TLC Match against Slash Venom Ricky Banderas and Apolo.	
36	Savio Vega	2	November 11, 2005	154	Bayamón, Puerto Rico			
37	Apolo	8	April 15, 2006	35	Caguas, Puerto Rico	Apocalipsis (2006)		
38	Savio Vega	3	May 20, 2006	28	Toa Baja, Puerto Rico			
39	Lightning	1	June 17, 2006	42	Bayamón, Puerto Rico		Won the title in a mask vs title match.	
40	Mikael Judas	1	July 29, 2006	35	Bayamón, Puerto Rico			
41	Ray González	5	September 2, 2006	7	Caguas, Puerto Rico	Golpe de Estado (2006)	Won the title in a 45 minutes for the gold match.	
	Vacant		September 9, 2006	7	Caguas, Puerto Rico	IWA TV Taping	Title held up after the match between Ray González and Mikael Judas.	
42	Ray González	6	September 16, 2006	84	Cayey, Puerto Rico	Noche de Justicia	Won the rematch against Mikael Judas in a 30 Minutes for the Gold Match. Invader I was the special referee in this match.	
43	Glamour Boy Shane	9	December 9, 2006	35	Bayamón, Puerto Rico	Christmas in PR (2006)	Defeated Ray González & Lightning in a 3-way match to win the title.	
44	Ray González	7	January 13, 2007	91	Cayey, Puerto Rico			
	Vacant		April 14, 2007	15	Caguas, Puerto Rico		González abandoned the promotion, entering a brief retirement from professional wrestling.	
45	Chicano	4	April 28, 2007	78	Cayey, Puerto Rico	La Pesadilla de Cayey	Defeated Joe Bravo for the vacant title. There were 2 special referees in the match: Chicky Starr and Bacano.	
46	Bison Smith	2	July 15, 2007	77	Yabucoa, Puerto Rico	Summer Attitude (2007)		
47	Blitz	1	September 29, 2007	139	Caguas, Puerto Rico	En Ruta al Oro (2007)	Blitz defeated Mr.Big (WWC Universal Champion) in a unification match on January 6, 2008 in Bayamon, Puerto Rico. The title was renamed Undisputed World Unified Heavyweight Championship. However, WWC didn't recognize the unification.	
48	Ricky Vega	1	February 16, 2008	49	Toa Baja, Puerto Rico	Guerra por el Oro (2008)	Won the title in a 5-way match against Blitz, Bison, Mr. Big and Glamour Boy Shane.	
	Vacant		May 17, 2008	29	Levittown, Toa Baja, Puerto Rico	Injustice (2008)	Title was stripped by the IWA.	
49	Blitz	2	May 17, 2008	63	Bayamón, Puerto Rico	Juicio Final (2008)	Won the title in a 3-way match against Ricky Vega and Chicano to win the vacant title. Savio Vega was the special referee.	
50	Joe Bravo	1	July 19, 2008	49	Bayamón, Puerto Rico	Summer Attitude (2008)	Savio Vega was a "Special Enforcer".	
51	Blitz	3	September 6, 2008	28	Bayamón, Puerto Rico	Armagedón (2008)		
52	Chicano	5	October 4, 2008	28	Bayamón, Puerto Rico	Golpe de Estado (2008)	Won a 3-way match against Blitz and Noriega.	
53	Dennis Rivera	1	November 1, 2008	14	Bayamón, Puerto Rico	IWA TV Taping		
54	Chicano	6	November 15, 2008	154	Bayamón, Puerto Rico	Hardcore Weekend (2008)	Won the title in a Cage Match.	
55	Joe Bravo	2	April 18, 2009	21	Bayamón, Puerto Rico	IWA TV Taping	Bravo became an international double champion also holding Dominican Wrestling Entertainment's Dominican National Championship.	
	Vacant		May 9, 2009	7	Hatillo, Puerto Rico	IWA TV Taping	Stripped by the company's General Manager, Savio Vega.	
56	Joe Bravo	3	May 16, 2009	63	Bayamón, Puerto Rico	Juicio Final (2009)	Defeated Jerry Lynn and Chicano in a 3-way match.	
	Vacant		July 18, 2009	29	Bayamón, Puerto Rico	IWA Decimo Aniversario	Title was held up after the match between Joe Bravo and Savio Vega.	
57	Joe Bravo	4	August 16, 2009	13	Cataño, Puerto Rico	Golpe de Estado (2009)	Won the rematch against Savio Vega.	
58	Miguel Pérez, Jr.	1	August 29, 2009	42	Cataño, Puerto Rico	Copa Alcalde José Rosario		
59	Joe Bravo	5	October 10, 2009	88	Bayamón, Puerto Rico	IWA TV Taping	Held along the IWA Intercontinental Heavyweight Championship.	
60	Glamour Boy Shane	10	January 6, 2010	101	Bayamón, Puerto Rico	Histeria Boricua (2010)		
61	Ricky Cruzz	1	April 17, 2010	70	Bayamón, Puerto Rico	Juicio Final (2010)	Won the title in a Gold Miner match.	
62	Rick Stanley	1	June 26, 2010	21	Bayamón, Puerto Rico	V Copa José Miguel Pérez	Won the title in an Extreme Rules Match.	
63	Ricky Cruzz	2	July 17, 2010	28	Bayamón, Puerto Rico	Summer Attitude (2010)	Won the title in a cage match.	
64	Rick Stanley	2	August 14, 2010	63	Bayamón, Puerto Rico	Armagedon (2010)	Won a 5-way match against Cruzz, Noel Rodríguez, Diabólico and Dennis Rivera.	
65	Dennis Rivera	2	October 16, 2010	82	Bayamón, Puerto Rico	Hardcore Weekend (2010)	Won a double title match for the IWA Puerto Rico and World Heavyweight titles. He became "Triple Mega Champion" as he was also Tag Team Champion at the time.	
66	Escobar	1	January 6, 2011	86	Bayamón, Puerto Rico	Histeria Boricua (2011)		
67	Hiram Tua	1	April 2, 2011	119	Toa Baja, Puerto Rico	Juicio Final (2011)		
68	Chris Angel	1	July 30, 2011	182	Bayamón, Puerto Rico	Summer Attitude (2011)	First wrestler to win the championship undefeated in singles competition within any of the major promotions. Held along the Intercontinental Heavyweight Championship.	
	Vacant		January 28, 2012		Toa Alta, Puerto Rico	Histeria Boricua (2012)	Title Stripped due to Chris Angel being unable to defend it. He is still undefeated following this event.	
69	Jay-Cobs	1	January 28, 2012	<1	Toa Alta, Puerto Rico	Histeria Boricua (2012)	Interim General Manager in substitution of Vega. Self-appointed himself as champion.	
70	Bonecrusher	1	January 28, 2012	119	Toa Alta, Puerto Rico	Histeria Boricua (2012)	On March 17, 2012, Bonecrusher defeated Chicano to win the EWO World Heavyweight Championship. First unification recognized by at least two of the major promotions in Puerto Rico.	
71	Spectro	1	May 26, 2012	<1	Cataño, Puerto Rico	VII Copa José Miguel Pérez	Won with help from Mr Big who went to the ring as referee.	
	Vacant		May 26, 2012		Cataño, Puerto Rico	VII Copa José Miguel Pérez	Title stripped by the IWA president Miguel Pérez when Mr. Big interfered in this match as a referee, did a countdown and Spectro won the title.	
72	Bonecrusher	2	May 26, 2012	21	Cataño, Puerto Rico	VII Copa José Miguel Pérez		
	Deactivated		June 16, 2012				When IWA closed for six years.	
73	Electro	1	January 12, 2019	238	Manatí, Puerto Rico	Impacto Total: El Tour 2019	Defeated Ricky Banderas, Apolo and Mr. Big in a 4-way match.	
74	Mikael Judas	2	September 7, 2019	84	Guaynabo, Puerto Rico	Golpe de Estado (2019)	Defeated Electro and Mr. Big in a Three-way Match.	
75	Mr. Big	1	November 30, 2019	609	Trujillo Alto, Puerto Rico	Hardcore Weekend (2019)		
76	Richard Holliday	1	July 31, 2021	112	San Juan, Puerto Rico	La Gran Amenaza (2021)	First contracted MLW star to win the title.	
77	Mr. Big	2	November 20, 2021	<1	Manatí, Puerto Rico	Impacto Total		
78	Lightning	2	November 20, 2021	1	Manatí, Puerto Rico	Hardcore Weekend (2021)		
79	Manny Ferno (IWE)	1	November 21, 2021	160	Manatí, Puerto Rico	Impacto Total	After winning the title, he renamed it as the IWE World Championship (Original IWA title design). Representing IWE.	
80	John Hawking (IWA half)	1	April 30, 2022	91	Humacao, Puerto Rico	Juicio Final (2022)	Hawking defeated Mr. Big, Manu & Aiden Grimm in a Gold Mine Match to win the IWA half (New IWA title design). The IWE Half was also contested at the last moments of the event. In storyline, both titles (IWA/IWE World title halfs) would hold the same hierarchy for months and the status as world champion was disputed. Representing IWA.	
81	Invader #1 (IWE half)	1	April 30, 2022	28	Humacao, Puerto Rico	Juicio Final (2022)	Defeated Manny Ferno to win the IWE title (original IWA title design) with Savio Vega serving as special Referee. A separate new champion was crowned earlier at the event to represent the IWA (new title design). In storyline, both titles (IWA/IWE World title halfs) would hold the same hierarchy for months and the status as world champion was disputed. Representing IWA.	
82	Manny Ferno (IWE Half)	2	May 28, 2022	154	Vega Baja, Puerto Rico	La Gran Amenaza (2022)	Defeated Invader #1 to win the IWE half (Original IWA title design). Representing IWE.	
83	Mr. Big (IWA Half)	3	July 30, 2022	112	Guaynabo, Puerto Rico	Summer Attitude (2022)	Defeated John Hawking to win the IWA half (New IWA Title design). Representing IWE.	
84	John Hawking (IWE Half and unification)	2 (IWE) / 3 (Undisputed)	October 29, 2022	49	Manati, Puerto Rico	Halloween Mayhem (2022)	Won the IWE half (Original IWA title design) from Manny Ferno, who represented IWE. In Golpe de Estado (November 19), defeated Mr. Big (representing IWE) to win the IWA half in a Title vs Title unification match. The title was branded once again as the **IWA Undisputed World Championship** and the IWE title half (old classic IWA title design) was retired, ending the IWA vs IWE title dispute storyline.	
85	Romeo Quevedo	1	December 17, 2022	20	Trujillo Alto, Puerto Rico	Christmas Hardcore Weekend in PR		
86	John Hawking	4	January 6, 2023	0	Juncos, Puerto Rico	Histeria Boricua (2023)		
87	Aiden André	1	January 6, 2023	15	Juncos, Puerto Rico	Histeria Boricua (2023)	Redeemed a title opportunity earned by winning a cup.	
88	John Hawking	5	January 21, 2023	98	Guaynabo, Puerto Rico	Histeria Boricua La Revancha (2023)		
89	Romeo Quevedo	2	April 29, 2023	49	Eustis, Florida	MCW LuchaCade	Second time that the title was defended at Movement Championship Wrestling (MCW).	
90	Niche	1	June 17, 2023	105	Humacao, Puerto Rico	Summer Attitude (2023)	Originally was Romeo Quevedo Vs Mike Mendoza with John Hawkins as Special referee early that night Niche won The José Miguel Pérez Sr. cup, he redeem it making a Triple Threat match.	
91	Mike Mendoza	1	September 30, 2023	231	Bayamon, Puerto Rico	Golpe de Estado (2023)		
92	El Niche	2	February 3, 2024	70	Guaynabo, Puerto Rico	25 Años de Historia		
93	El Cuervo	1	April 13, 2024	35	Trujillo Alto, Puerto Rico	Juicio Final (2024)		
94	Pedro Portillo III	1	May 18, 2024	133	Vega Alta, Puerto Rico	La Gran Amenaza (2024)		
95	John Hawking	6	September 28, 2024	749	Bayamón, Puerto Rico	Golpe de Estado 2024		
—	Vacated	—	December 27, 2025	—	Humacao, Puerto Rico	Christmas Hardcore Weekend	Due to Hawking’s departure from the IWA.	
96	The Falcon Jay Blake	1	December 27, 2025	56	Humacao, Puerto Rico	Christmas Hardcore Weekend	He defeated Nihan to win the vacant title.	
97	El Anarquista Manú	1	February 21, 2026	105	Vega Alta, Puerto Rico	Vendetta		
98	Ricky Banderas	6	June 6, 2026	63	Humacao, Puerto Rico	Legend Mania		
99	El Dragón Nihan	1	August 8, 2026	58+	Humacao, Puerto Rico	Summer Attitude (2026)	Cash in a World Cup to win the title.	

== Combined Reigns ==
As of October 17, 2026.

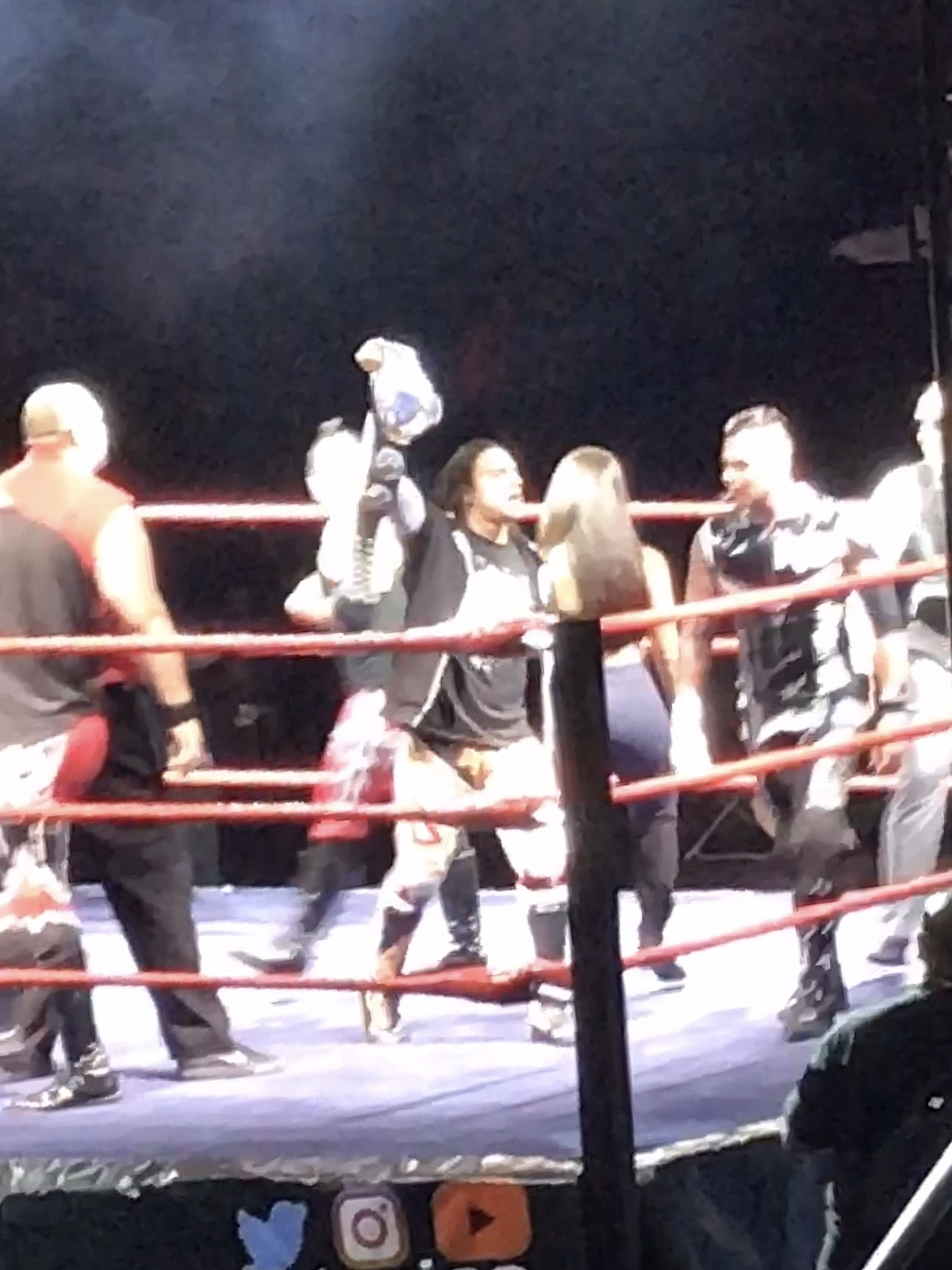
First champion following reinstatement, "La Nueva Cara" Electro.

†	Indicates the current champion

Rank	Wrestler	No. of reigns	Combined days
1	Mr. Big	3	834
2	Ray González	7	553
3	John Hawking	6	987+
4	Glamour Boy Shane	10	453
5	Chicano	6	414
6	Apolo	8	343
7	Manny Ferno	2	314
8	Ricky Banderas/El Mesias	6	279
9	Electro	1	238
10	Joe Bravo	5	234
11	Blitz	3	231
11	Mike Mendoza	1	231
13	Savio Vega	3	224
14	Chris Angel	1	182
15	El Niche	2	175
16	Bonecrusher	2	140
17	Pedro Portillo III	1	133
18	Mikael Judas	2	126
19	Hiram Tua	1	119
20	Richard Holliday	1	112
21	Bison Smith	2	104
22	Ricky Cruzz	2	98
23	Dennis Rivera	2	96
24	Escobar	1	86
25	Rick Stanley	2	84
26	Romeo Quevedo	2	69
27	Ricky Vega	1	49
28	Lightning	2	43
29	Primo Carnero	3	43
30	Slash Venom	1	42
30	Miguel Pérez, Jr.	1	42
32	El Cuervo	1	35
33	Humongous	1	32
34	Invader #1	1	28
35	Pain	1	21
36	Aiden André	1	15
37	Spectro	1	<1
37	Jay-Cobs	1	<1
