= Bison Smith =

American professional wrestler (1970–2011)

- Smith's Pro Wrestling Noah publicity photo.

Personal information
- Born: Mark Thomas Smith; September 24, 1970 Arcadia, California, U.S.
- Died: November 22, 2011 (aged 41) Carolina, Puerto Rico
- Cause of death: Heart complications
- Children: 2

Professional wrestling career
- Ring name(s): Bison Smith; Bison; Buffalo Bison; Mark Smith; Super Destroyer 2000
- Billed height: 6 ft 3 in (191 cm)
- Billed weight: 280 lb (127 kg)
- Billed from: Denver, Colorado
- Trained by: Donovan Morgan; Michael Modest
- Debut: April 12, 1998

Mark Thomas Smith (September 24, 1970 – November 22, 2011) was an American professional wrestler, better known by his ring name, Bison Smith. He was best known for his appearances with Pro Wrestling Noah in Japan; and World Wrestling Council and International Wrestling Association in Puerto Rico. In January 2009, he joined the American promotion Ring of Honor.

After being trained by Donovan Morgan and Michael Modest, Smith began wrestling on the independent circuit. He began competing for the International Wrestling Association in Puerto Rico in 2003, and held the IWA World Heavyweight Championship on two occasions, the IWA World Tag Team Championship once, the IWA Intercontinental Heavyweight Championship once, and the IWA Hardcore Championship one time. He also wrestled for Pro Wrestling Noah, and on May 23, 2008, he won the GHC Tag Team Championship with Akitoshi Saito and again on April 14, 2010, with Keith Walker. He also won the Global Tag League tournament with Saito in 2008. In January 2009, he debuted for Ring of Honor, where he was pushed as "unstoppable", before he joined Prince Nana's Embassy faction.

== Early life and career ==
Smith was born in Arcadia, California and moved to Fresno, California when he was one year old, where he was raised. He began weightlifting at the age of 13. He played American football at the University of Colorado, where he was an offensive lineman. After his final year at college, Smith worked as a furniture mover. He later moved to Colorado.

== Professional wrestling career ==
=== Training and early career ===
While in California Smith trained at the All Pro Wrestling promotion under Donovan Morgan and Mike Modest. He debuted in 1998. He also wrestled under a mask in 2000 as "Super Destroyer 2000" managed by Buddy Sotello Esq. as part of the "Sotello Syndicate", along with tag team partner Vinnie "the Innovator" Massaro.

=== Independent and Japanese promotions ===
Smith toured in Japan first in July 2001. On June 7, 2003, Smith won the Pro Wrestling IRON Heavyweight Championship, by defeating Bart Blaxson, and held the title for nearly two years before he dropped it on April 28, 2005, to California wrestler Malachi. He competed for the International Wrestling Association (IWA) in Puerto Rico, where, on November 1, 2003, he defeated Glamour Boy Shane to win the IWA World Heavyweight Championship, which he held for over a month, before losing it back to Glamour Boy Shane. On July 16, 2004, he defeated Slash Venom to win the vacant IWA Hardcore Championship. He lost it later that month to Chet Jablonski. On September 25, 2004, Smith won the New Breed Wrestling Association's top championship, the NBWA Championship, when he and Morgan defeated B. J. Whitmer and ODB in a tag team match, where the person who won the pin, won the Championship. He competed sporadically for the next few months, and won the IWA Intercontinental Heavyweight Championship from Glamour Boy Shane on November 20, 2005. He held the Championship for over a year, before losing it to Slash Venom on December 12, 2005, in a steel cage match.

He began competing for the Japanese promotion, Pro Wrestling Noah, in 2005, where he competed mainly in tag team matches. He made his Pro Wrestling Noah debut on May 29, 2005, where he, Akitoshi Saito, and Takashi Sugiura defeated Akira Taue, Takuma Sano, and Jun Izumida. In his next appearance two days later, Smith and Low Ki were defeated by KENTA and Kenta Kobashi. He teamed with fellow Americans, and his trainers, Michael Modest and Donovan Morgan in June to defeat Takeshi Rikio, Muhammad Yone, and Yoshinobu Kanemaru, which was followed by a defeat for his team, also including Akitoshi Saito and Masao Inoue, to Mitsuharu Misawa, Akira Taue, and Jun Izumida. Smith didn't appear again in Pro Wrestling Noah until he went on a tour with them in November 2005, where he usually teamed up with fellow "gaijins", or foreigners, most commonly Low Ki. He also teamed with Nigel McGuinness, Doug Williams and Scorpio on various occasions throughout November and December 2005.

At the start of 2006, Smith returned to the United States, where he began competing for New Wrestling Superstars. In August 2006, Smith began regularly wrestling for Fusion Pro Wrestling. He also wrestled for the American Wrestling Federation (AWF), and on November 11, 2006, he won the AWF Heavyweight Championship by defeating Steve Gatorwolf. In July 2007, he returned to the IWA in Puerto Rico, where he won the IWA World Heavyweight title for the second time by defeating Chicano on July 15. He later lost the Championship to Blitz on September 30, 2007. In October 2007, while touring Japan with Pro Wrestling Noah, he suffered a broken breastbone. In 2008, he returned to Pro Wrestling Noah, and, with Akitoshi Saito, won the GHC Tag Team Championship on May 23, by defeating Naomichi Marufuji and Takashi Sugiura. Smith and Saito also won the Global Tag League 2008. On April 14, 2010, Smith teamed up with Keith Walker to win the GHC Tag Team Championship from Takeshi Rikioh and Muhammad Yone. On August 31, however, Walker's father died. Walker later chose not to immediately return to Japan, and on September 10 both Smith and Walker were stripped of the GHC Tag Team Championship. On January 15, 2011, Smith unsuccessfully challenged Takashi Sugiura for the GHC Heavyweight Championship.

=== Ring of Honor ===
Smith made his Ring of Honor (ROH) debut at Full Circle on January 16, 2009, in Manassas, Virginia, by interrupting a match between Rhett Titus and Sean Denny, and attacking both men. The next night at Injustice II, Smith interrupted a match between Grizzly Redwood and Chris Escobar, and attacked both men. At the Caged Collision pay-per-view, which was taped on January 31, Smith attacked Bryan Danielson, during a number one contender's match, powerbombing him on the floor and giving him a concussion. Smith made his in-ring debut on February 6, at Proving Ground 2009 Night One. He quickly defeated Sal Rinauro gaining the victory with the Skull Vise Slam. The next night at Proving Ground Night Two, Smith gained his second victory, defeating John Kermon. On the March 4 edition of the ROH Video Wire, it was revealed that Prince Nana, a manager who had just recently returned to ROH, was controlling Smith. Smith had his first loss in ROH on March 13 at Stylin' and Profilin', when he lost to Danielson by countout. Smith made his debut in the Hammerstein Ballroom in New York City in a losing effort teaming with the returning Jimmy Rave against Danielson and the returning Colt Cabana on March 21. Smith, with Rave and Ernie Osiris, then joined the newly reformed Embassy faction, led by Prince Nana.

== Death ==
Smith died on November 22, 2011, in Puerto Rico due to heart complications. Men in Smith's family had a history of early deaths linked to heart disease, Smith's maternal grandfather died at the age of 43 due to heart disease, and several of his maternal great-uncles also died from heart-related issues. Heart disease was a recurring condition in Smith's family. Smith was in Puerto Rico because he was due to fight Eddie Colon the same week during World Wrestling Council's Crossfire show. The event started with a tribute to Smith by Willie Urbina with the WWC roster in the arena.

== Championships and accomplishments ==
- All Pro Wrestling
  - APW Tag Team Championship (1 time) – with Boyce LeGrande
- American Wrestling Federation
  - AWF Heavyweight Championship (1 time)
- International Wrestling Association
  - IWA World Heavyweight Championship (2 times)
  - IWA Intercontinental Heavyweight Championship (1 time)
  - IWA Hardcore Championship (1 time)
  - IWA World Tag Team Championship (1 time) – with Miguel Perez
- New Breed Wrestling Association
  - NBWA Heavyweight Championship (1 time)
- Pro Wrestling Illustrated
  - PWI ranked him #196 of the top 500 singles wrestlers in the PWI 500 in 2010
- Pro Wrestling IRON
  - PWI International Wrestling Championship (1 time)
- Pro Wrestling Noah
  - GHC Tag Team Championship (2 times) – with Akitoshi Saito (1) and Keith Walker (1)
  - Global Tag League (2008) – with Akitoshi Saito
  - Global Tag League Outstanding Performance (2009)- with Akitoshi Saito
  - Global Tag League Technique Prize (2011)- with Masao Inoue
