= Dennis Rivera (wrestler) =

Puerto Rican wrestler (born 1979)

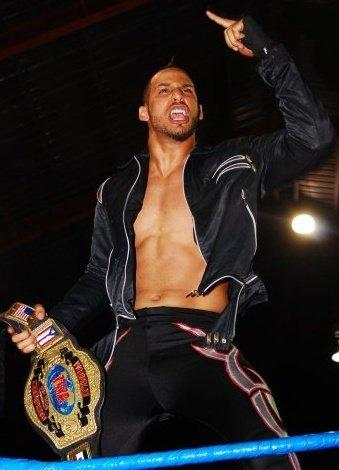
- Rivera as the IWA World Tag Team Champion

Personal information
- Born: Dennis Alexis Rivera Rodríguez; September 27, 1979 (age 47) Vega Alta, Puerto Rico
- Relative: Savio Vega (brother)

Professional wrestling career
- Ring name(s): D-nnis; Dennis Rivera; Dennis Rodríguez
- Billed height: 6 ft 2 in (1.88 m)
- Billed weight: 205 lb (93 kg)
- Trained by: Alex "Lighting" Cruz; Savio Vega
- Debut: 2007

Dennis Alexis Rivera Rodríguez (born September 27, 1979) is a Puerto Rican professional wrestler. He is part of a tag team known as La Malicia along Noel Rodríguez, which after holding the International Wrestling Association's World Tag Team Championship on several occasions participated in the only unificatory tag team contest co-sanctioned by the two major Puerto Rican promotions of the 2000s, when they challenged for the World Wrestling Council's titles on September 24, 2011. The result of the match remains controversial, Rivera and Rodríguez were originally declared winners and left the building with both sets of belts, but WWC revoked the original result to a "no contest" minutes later. However, the IWA still recognized the coronation of the first Undisputed Tag Team Champions in Puerto Rico. Rivera also worked in the World Wrestling League, where he held the WWL Trios Championship.

== Biography ==
Rivera's brother, Juan Rivera is a professional wrestler who has wrestled in the World Wrestling Council and World Wrestling Federation, better known by his ring name, Savio Vega. Due to his family's involvement in the business, he became familiar with its inner workings early in his life. Dennis Rivera visited his brother Savio Vega while working in the WWE and got the opportunity to meet many WWE wrestlers backstage. His brother would be involved in the establishment of the International Wrestling Association in 2001, along Miguel Pérez, Jr. and Víctor Quiñones. Due to this, Rivera formed friendships with several of the company's employees. He decided to join a group in a training exercise out of curiosity, eventually choosing to practice full-time. Before entering professional wrestling, Rivera was working in a factory and as a bass player for a rock band. Upon learning that he was training, his brother enrolled him in a wrestling school, seeking better training. On February 19, 2012, he debuted a professional wrestling blog titled "La Rompecuellos", his first published work, for mainstream digital newspaper Noticel.

== Early career (2007–2011) ==
=== International Wrestling Association (2007-2010) ===
Rivera's first work in the company was helping with the scenario's preparation before a card and doing promotions. This was incorporated in his first angle as an active wrestler, when he formed part of a stable known as the "Ring Crew" along Noel Rodríguez. His official debut took place on April 21, 2007, when he participated in a tag team match against Los Luchas. Rivera's first participation in one of the company's major events occurred on June 9, 2007, when he defeated Tommy Diablo in a stipulation match. The tag team soon joined the Starr Corporation, led by José Laureano also known as Chicky Starr.

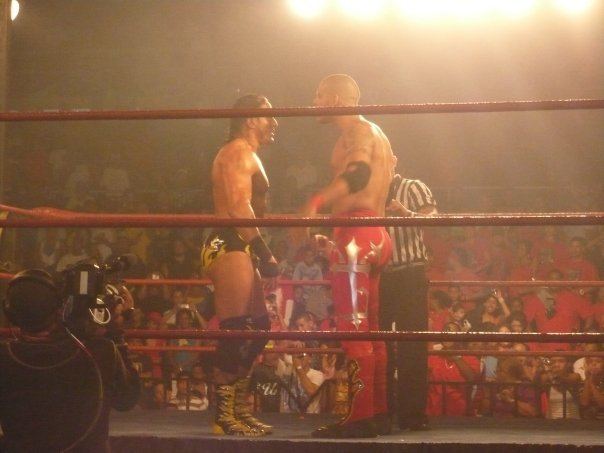
El Mesías and Rivera

Rivera sold his heel character by dropping his first last name, referring to himself as "Dennis Rodríguez", during this time him and Noel Rodríguez were referred to as "Los Rodríguez", eventually becoming "Los Dueños de la Malicia". The team turned on Laureano joining Savio Vega, signifying the end of the "Starr Corporation". The new stable was included in an angle, where they would ambush anyone with ties to the World Wrestling Council. On May 31, 2008, Los Dueños de la Malicia won the IWA World Tag Team Championship. At Summer Attitude 2008, they defeated the Cruz del Diablo to retain the titles. The team was booked against Total Nonstop Action Wrestling's Latin American X-Change, winning to retain the championship. Subsequently, LAX returned at Noches de Campeones 2009 and Los Dueños de la Malicia dropped the titles to them. The Loteria del Terror angle was concluded when Los Dueños de la Malicia were booked to beat Vega and Pérez. Rivera was involved in a feud with Vega throughout the first half of the year, which came to a conclusion in May, when he was turned face by defending Vega from an assault. At the IWA Tenth Anniversary event, former AAA Mega Champion Gilbert Cosme, known internationally as "El Mesías" Ricky Banderas, was booked over Rivera. Consequently, he was expelled from Los Dueños de la Malicia, which at this point had become a stable. At Histeria Boricua 2010, Rivera was booked over Kahagas to retain the title.

=== CWA, Bronco and Daniel Bryan ===
On April 10, 2010, Rivera debuted in the Champion Wrestling Association as a face, turning on his tag team partner during the match. His participation with the promotion was brief, returning to the IWA months after his debut. On September 10, 2010, he was involved in two matches, winning the first involving El Bronco by disqualification. Later, Rivera was booked to defeat active World Wrestling Entertainment (WWE) employee and first contender for the WWE United States Championship, Daniel Bryan, by pinfall to win the IWA Puerto Rico Heavyweight Championship. (Note: After winning the IWA Puerto Rico Heavyweight Championship (from Q.T. Marshall on July 17, 2010) Bryan returned to WWE at SummerSlam and entered into a feud with The Miz, officially becoming the challenger for the WWE United States Championship on the September 6, 2010 edition of Raw, four days before this match. Nine days after losing the IWA Puerto Rico Heavyweight Championship to Rivera, Bryan won the WWE United States Championship at Night of Champions.) After winning this match, he entered a feud with Rick Stanley for the IWA Undisputed Heavyweight Championship, which was interrupted when a stipulation match was ordered and they were forced to team, winning the IWA World Tag Team Championship. Rivera went on to defeat his partner and became a triple-champion. He held the three belts until November 20, 2010, when he was stripped of the IWA Puerto Rico Heavyweight Championship for failing to defend it in over 55 days and let Stanley be pinned to drop the tag team titles. In the first half of 2011, he feuded with Chris Angel who had "retired" his brother in a previous storyline. Rivera attempted to break Angel's undefeated streak twice, but failed on both occasions. Subsequently, La Malicia reunited and began an angle with Carlos Cotto, who led several teams composed of former Lucha Libre 101 members. From which Rivera and Rodríguez emerged as World Tag Team Champions.

== Interpromotional angles; Undisputed Tag Team Championship ==
=== El Bombazo and Golpe de Estado en Septiembre Negro ===
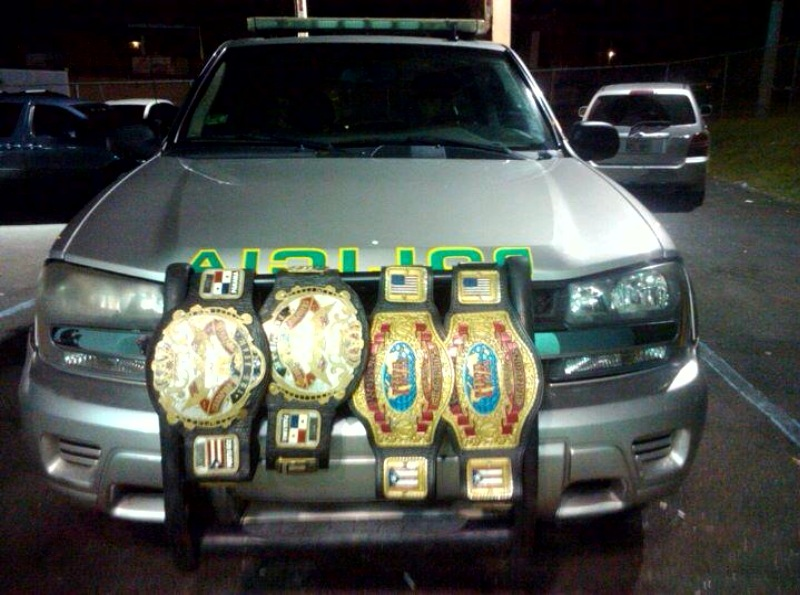
The Unified Tag Team Championship

In July 2011, Savio Vega appeared in WWC programming, beginning the first interpromotional angle between both promotions. Rivera and Rodríguez were among the first to participate in a WWC event as an active IWA wrestler, joining several wrestlers in an appearance at Aniversario 2011. There they were booked to ambush the WWC World Tag Team Champions, Wilfredo "Lynx" Rivera and "Niche" Marrero following a match against Thunder and Lighting, who were being booked as IWA employees despite working for WWC. Between major events, they dropped the belts to a tag team which featured Vega's debuting student, Diego de Jesús, recovering them the next week. The angle continued at Summer Attitude, where Rivera and Rodríguez confronted several WWC wrestlers that counter invaded the event. Despite experiencing an overwhelming positive response from the public, the interpromotional angle fell due to economic and creative differences between the executives of both companies. Despite this, Rivera and Rodríguez decided to participate in WWC's Septiembre Negro independently while still the reigning IWA World Tag Team Champions. The contest was against Marrero and Rivera, but only the WWC championships were on the line. La Malicia won the contest by pinfall and were announced as new titlists, immediately leaving the building and defying the original booking, in which the titles were to be held up in a subsequent skit.

WWC attempted to nullify the match and lists the result as a "no contest", but Rivera and Rodríguez kept physical possession of the belts, issuing a challenge for the IWA championship in an attempt to revive the interpromotional angle despite being unfavored by the promoters of both companies. They began a tour throughout Puerto Rico's independent scene, in which they appeared with both belt sets and continuously repeated the challenge, expanding it to independent tag team champions as well. One of the accepted challenges took place on November 5, 2011, when they challenged Guevara and Zapata to an unification for the IWA, WWC and Extreme Wrestling Organization (EWO) World Tag Team Championships, which concluded in a no contest. Following this event, Marrero and "Lynx" Rivera, accompanied by two independent wrestlers, ambushed Noel and his girlfriend, gaining illegal possession of one of the IWA belts and recovering of WWC's. The other half was still owned by Dennis Rivera, who was not present in the scene. Despite this event, La Malicia continued the tour appearing at New Pro Wrestling on November 19, 2011, confronting NPW World Tag Team Champions and WWC employees, Thunder and Lighting, for the belts. The challenge was accepted for NPW's last event of the year, Cierre de Temporada ending in a no contest. La Malicia was selected 2011's Tag Team of the Year in both Puerto Rico Wrestling and Lucha Libre Online's open vote.

=== Tiempos de Guerra ===
La Malicia emulated the event at WWC un an interpromotional angle between IWA and EWO, taking the EWO World Tag Teams Championship belts with them at Tierra de Nadie. However, at Histeria Boricua they both dropped the IWA titles in a defense and lost the EWO belts when a team known as "Los Lights" recovered them during the match. At Kaos and Odissey, Rivera challenged Carlos Cupeles for the IWA Television Championship, only to lose when distracted by an EWO cameraman. At Clash of the Titans, La Malicia regained the status of first contenders, winning a tag team three-way match. In this event, La Milicia also became the IWA World Tag Team Champions. As part of the promotional buildup for IWA's Payback, La Malicia joined a heel-face coalition to drive EWO away, officially dubbed "Team IWA". However, at the event Rivera and Rodríguez lost to La Milicia in a no-disqualification titular contest following outside intervention from a stable of masked wrestlers only known as "El Ejército Positivo". On May 26, 2012, La Malicia challenged for the championship, but the match concluded in a no contest. After Juicio Final was postponed for unspecified reasons, Rivera and Rodríguez began an independent tour, joining the Puerto Rico Wrestling Association.

== Post-IWA, international tryouts ==
=== WWL, La Nueva Rabia (2014–2015) ===
After IWA stopped holding regular cards, Rivera and Rodríguez made sporadic appearances in the local independent circuit. After his brother performed with the rest of Los Boricuas in the World Wrestling League, Rivera joined the promotion as part of an anti-establishment angle. As the leader of a rebel stable known as La Nueva Rabia, a revisiting of a different group known as La Rabia that had been created by Jack Meléndez in 2007 and that performed in WWC and IWA, he served as foil to Richard Negrín's role as president of WWL. While actively feuding with Negrín's faction, Rivera joined Rodríguez and Daniel García Soto (also known by the pseudonym of Stefano) to become the first WWL Trios Champions. However, both the titles and the angle were abandoned once WWL entered into a brief hiatus that led to the exit of his brother and other talents, with the vacant titles being won by the original La Rabia.

=== WWE tryout; independent circuit (2014–present) ===
In March 2014, Rivera participated in a tryout for WWE. He was invited to the WWE Performance Center in Florida, where he was subjected to a series of tests. When questioned about this audition, Rivera discarded that being older than the prospects typically scouted by the promotion would affect his chances, believing that his experience and previous ties to the business gave him an edge over them and noting that some of the more recent additions had debuted over the age of thirty. In anticipation, Rivera underwent a quartering, where he improved his training and avoided alcohol and other distractions following the advice of his brother, who warned him of the challenge that WWE's itinerary represents. Despite not being contracted by the promotion, he employed the occasion that represented Carlos Colón's induction into the WWE Hall of Fame to lobby for the inclusion of José Miguel Pérez, another Puerto Rican wrestler that competed during the Vince McMahon, Sr. era and who held the promotion's first set of tag team titles (the NWA-CWC World Tag Team Championship) along Antonino Rocca, remaining the only tag team champions to stay undefeated during their entire run in the company.

On June 8, 2015, New Revolution Wrestling announced that Rivera would be joining their roster. Performing as a heel in his return, he attacked a masked wrestler known as Mariachi and took the latter's NRW Global Championship belt after incapacitating him. On July 31, 2015, Rivera won this title in a match between both as part of the promotion's Summer Revolution card. Parallel to this, he made appearances for CWA, where he won an eliminatory to become the first contender to the promotion's main title at an event named Sunmer Mayhem. On August 8, 2015, Rivera defeated Akiles Falcón to win the CWA World Heavyweight Championship.

2018 to present Dennis Rivera currently host a podcast called La Vuelta produce by Juan Ramírez.

== Championships and accomplishments ==
- Champion Wrestling Association (Puerto Rico)
  - CWA World Championship (2 times)
  - Victor Rodríguez Memorial Cup (2013)
- International Wrestling Association
  - IWA Undisputed World Heavyweight Championship (2 times)
  - IWA Intercontinental Championship (1 time)
  - IWA World Tag Team Championship (7 times) – with Noel Rodríguez (4), Chicano (2) and Rick Stanley (1)
  - IWA Puerto Rico Heavyweight Championship (1 time)
  - José Miguel Pérez Memorial Cup (2009)
- Entertainment Wrestling Organization
  - EWO World Tag Team Championship (1 time) – with Noel Rodriguez
- New Revolution Wrestling
  - NRW Global Championship (2 times)
- Pro Wrestling Illustrated
  - PWI ranked him #302 of the top 500 singles wrestlers in the PWI 500 in 2011
- World Wrestling Council
  - WWC World Tag Team Championship (1 time) – with Noel Rodríguez
- World Wrestling League
  - WWL World Trios Championship (1 time) – with Noel Rodriguez and Stefano

== See also ==
- Professional wrestling in Puerto Rico
