= WWL World Trios Championship =

Professional wrestling trios tag team championship

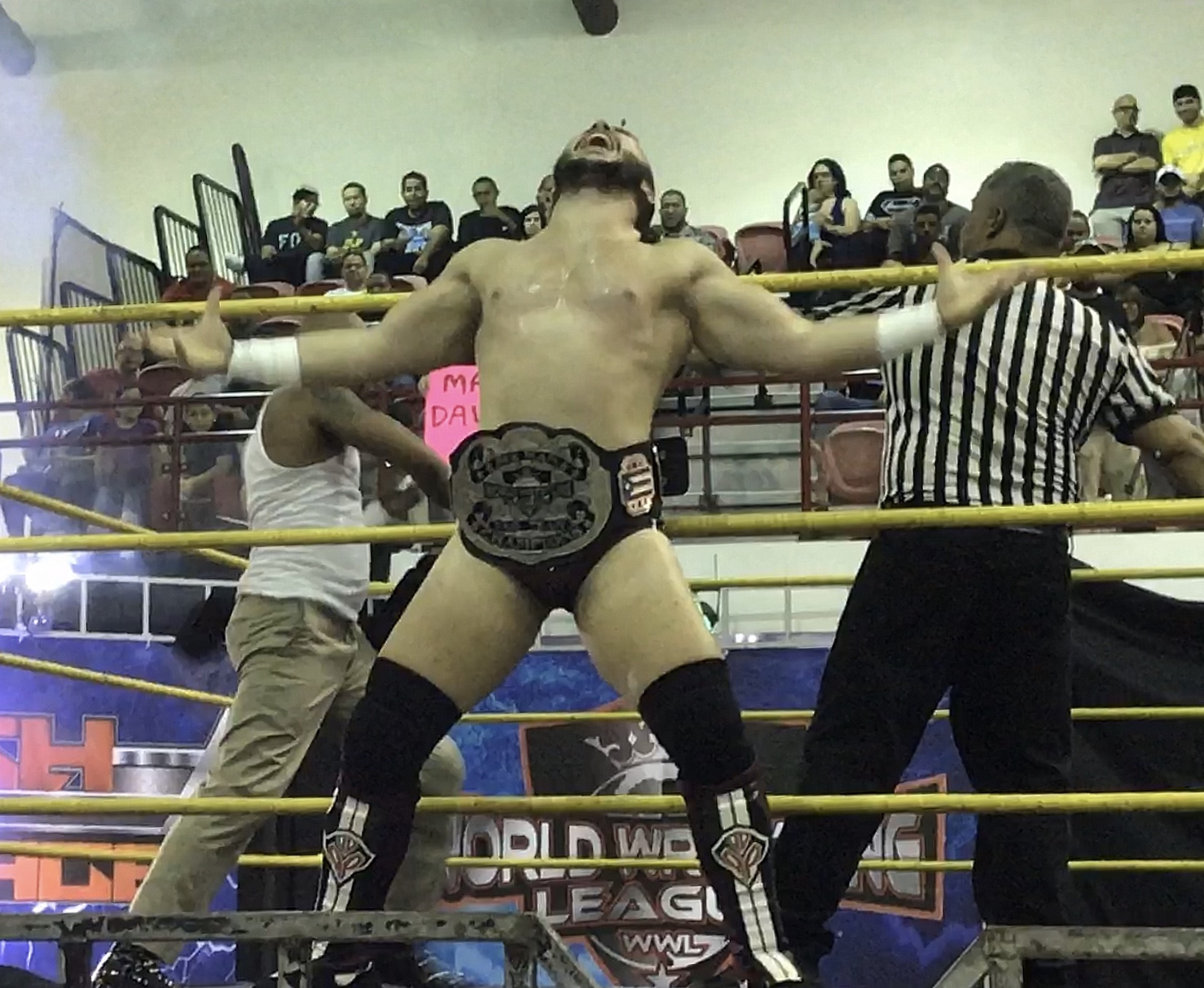
- Mark Davidson as a third of the titleholders (Los Favoritos) in 2017.

Details
- Promotion: World Wrestling League
- Date established: December 13, 2014
- Current champion: Vacant
- Date won: April 20, 2018
Statistics
- First champion: La Rabia
- Most reigns: (As Tag Team) All Champions (1 reign) (As Individual) Mark Davidson (3 reigns)
- Longest reign: Legio (336 days)
- Shortest reign: Puro Macho (13 days)

The WWL World Trios Championships is a professional wrestling championship promoted by the World Wrestling League (WWL) promotion in Puerto Rico.

The championship was generally contested in professional wrestling matches, in which participants execute scripted finishes rather than contend in direct competition.

== Title history ==
#	Wrestlers	Reign	Date	Days held	Location	Event	Notes	Ref
1	La Rabia (Dennis Rivera, Noel Rodríguez and Stefano)	1	December 13, 2014	98	Bayamon, Puerto Rico	Insurrection	Defeated The Rodríguez Brothers and Caifas to become the first champions.	
2	Los Rabiosos (Mr. Big, Blitz and Niche)	1	March 21, 2015	147	Bayamon, Puerto Rico	International Cup		
3	Legio (Spectro, Kronya and Vassago)	1	August 15, 2015	336	Toa Baja, Puerto Rico	Sin Piedad		
4	Rikochet, Apolo Jr. and Mark Davidson	1	July 16, 2016	28	Canovanas, Puerto Rico	Edicion Especial - WWL High Voltage	Kronya was absent so Nightmare from CWS La Escuela wrestled. This special episode aired on Youtube on August 10, 2016.	
5	Vacant	-	August 13, 2016	126	Arecibo, Puerto Rico	WWL Summer Blast	Vacated by GM Dennis Rivera due to interference in match by JC Navarro. It aired on tape delay on August 18, 2016	
6	Justin Dynamite, Excellent Mantel and Mark Davidson ^{(2)}	1	December 17, 2016	99	Bayamon, Puerto Rico	WWL Christmas in P.R	Defeated The Bullying Crew to win the vacant title. it aired on Youtube on January 9, 2017..	
7	Allison, Excellent Mantel ^{(2)} and Mark Davidson ^{(3)}	1	March 25, 2017	391	Guaynabo, Puerto Rico	Genesis	La Perla Negra Allison replaces Justin Dynamite who left from WWL on February 5, 2017.	
8	Puro Macho (PMS, Kris The Chosen Diaz and Electro)	1	April 20, 2018	13	Dorado, Puerto Rico	Juicio Final		
–	Vacant	–	May 3, 2018	–				
