= Electro (wrestler) =

Puerto Rican professional wrestler

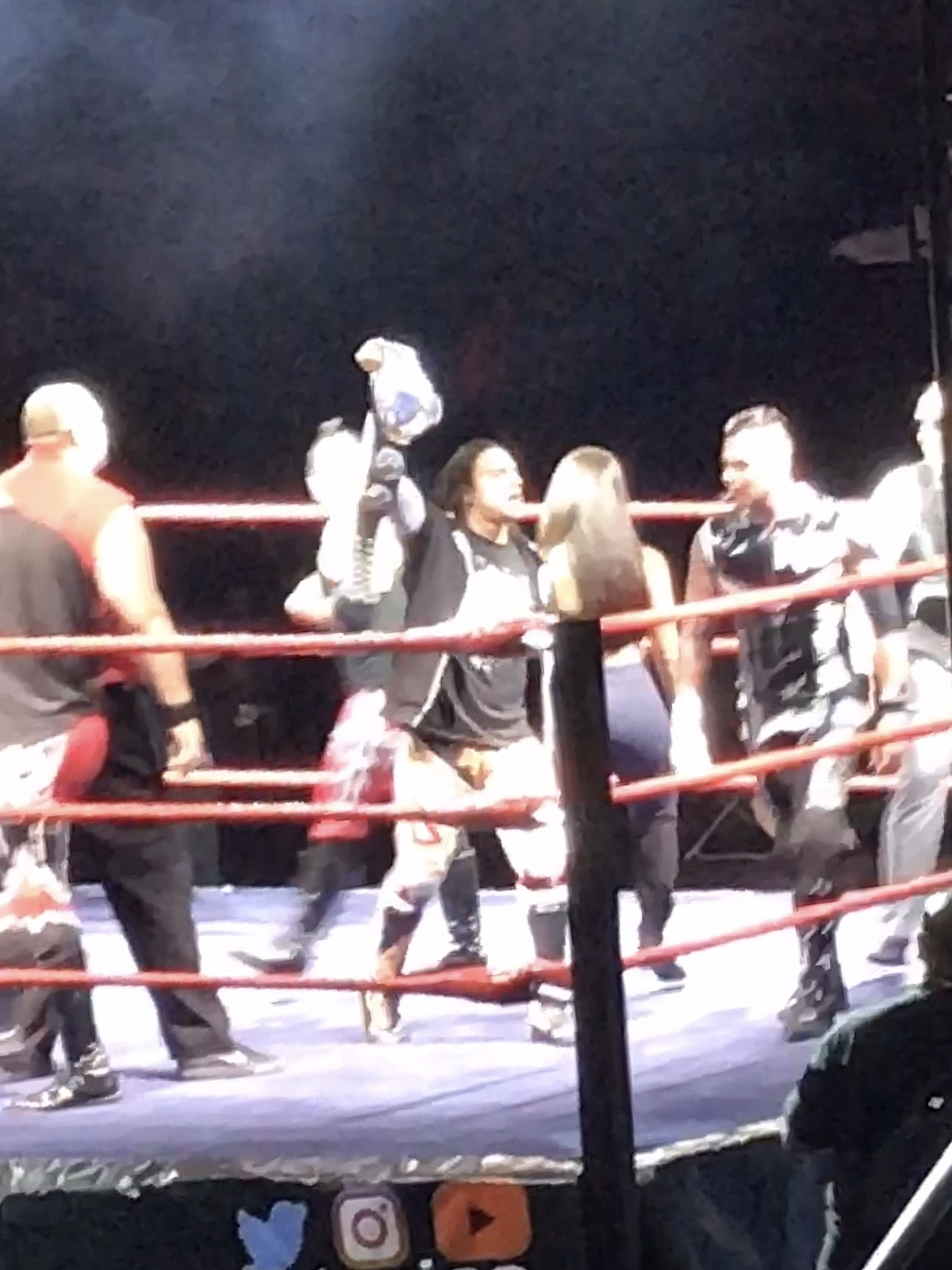
- Electro at the IWA World Heavyweight Championships

Personal information
- Born: Álex Montalvo; 1997 (age 28–29) Ponce, Puerto Rico

Professional wrestling career
- Ring name(s): Electro Boy; Electro
- Billed height: 5 ft 8 in (1.73 m)
- Billed from: Ponce, Puerto Rico
- Debut: 2014

Álex Montalvo (born 1997) is a Puerto Rican professional wrestler better known by the ring name Electro. Locally, he has performed for top-tier promotions World Wrestling League (WWL) and International Wrestling Association (IWA-PR). Spending most of the early stages of his career in team action, he collected the WWL World Trios Championship. In 2019, Electro became winner of the IWA World Heavyweight Championship.

== Professional wrestling career ==
=== Early career (2014–2016) ===
When interviewed, Montalvo expressed that he was widely underestimated early in his career, noting that even his teacher was sceptical of his potential. In January 2014, he began his career by performing as "Electro Boy" in the independent circuit, appearing in regional promotions like Caribbean Wrestling Federation, 100% Lucha and WPV, among others.

Montalvo joined the World Wrestling League in 2016, where he began performing and later became simply known as "Electro" in the undercard while being evaluated. During this time he continued appearing at 100% Lucha, joining Víctor Meléndez against Black Money Services, and Noche de Evolución 4. At WWL, Electro was randomly attacked by the Westside Mafia as they threatened Savio Vega with revealing the contents of a mysterious black box. Electro then unsuccessfully challenged 5to Elemento for the WWL Super Cruiserweight Championship. During this time, Manny Ferno began approaching him to join a nascent stable called Puro Macho. Electro continued pursuing titles, joining Jayden and Sr. C in an unsuccessful challenge for the WWL World Trios Championship.

=== Puro Macho, main event push (2017–2018) ===
As part of Puro Macho, Electro faced off in a series against La Hermandad. Afterwards, he joined Khriz "The Chosen" and JC Navarro in a win over the Westside Mafia. Afterwards, Electro and Khriz failed to win the WWL World Tag Team Championship in a rematch that also included La Hermandad and Los Primos Rodríguez. Without the involvement of the other two teams, Westside Mafia still retained. Afterwards, Electro unsuccessfully challenged Payatronic for the Super Cruiserweight Championship. After the passing of Hurricane María forced a hiatus for WWL, Electro joined other members of Puro Macho in continuing a feud against La Hermandad at independent promotion NEW in Ponce. This was given continuity once operations resumed, along Ferno's ambitions of having them collect titles.

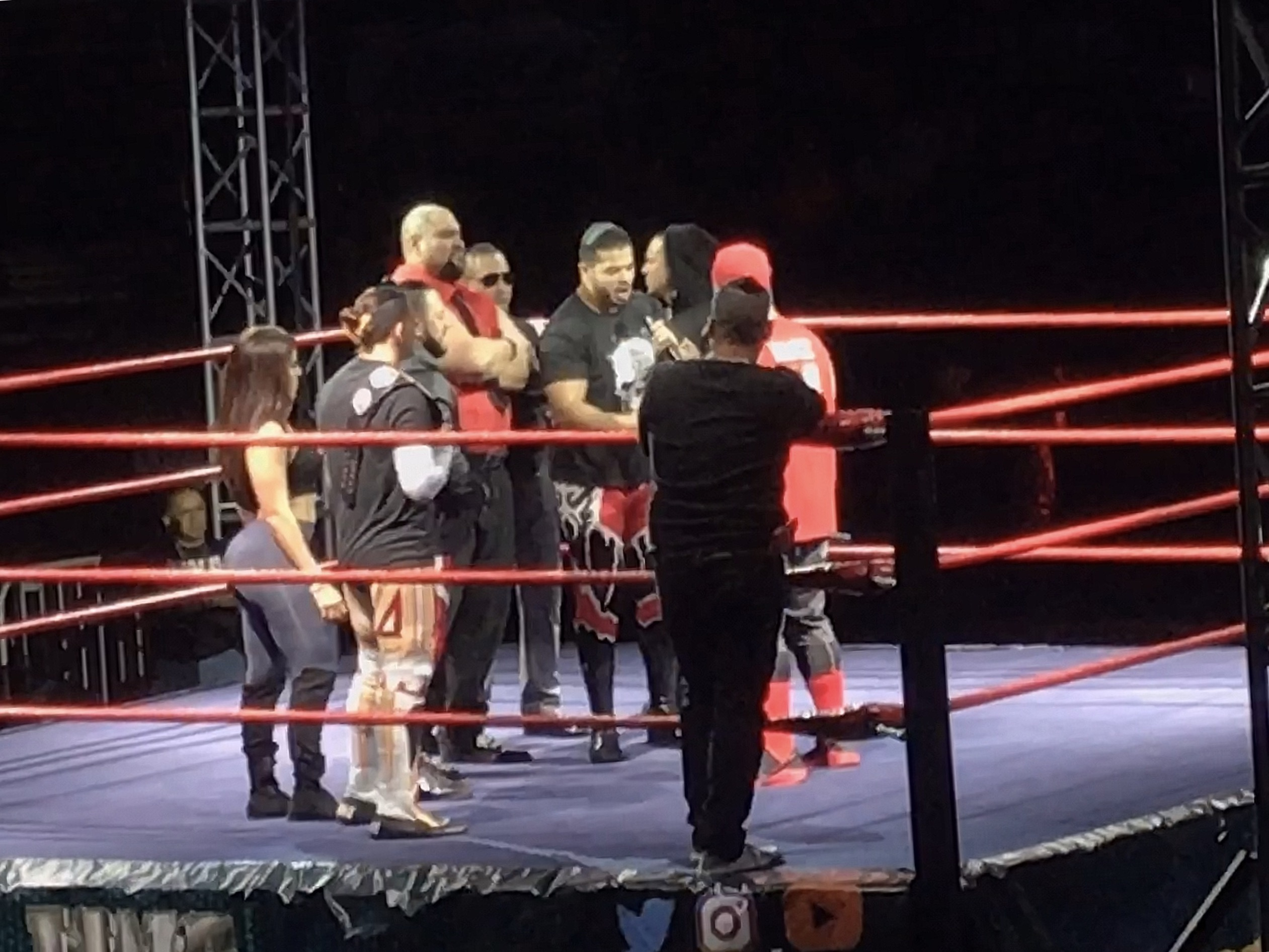
Electro as part of Puro Macho.

Electro then joined Khriz and David Montes in defeating Los Favoritos and winning the WWL World Trios Championship. At Juicio Final, Savio Vega made his return to WWL with a team of former IWA wrestlers and challenged Manny Ferno for control. Electro joined Puro Macho in defeating Team Savio/IWA at Golpe de Estado, in the process stopping an attempt to rename the promotion. Electro and Khriz then attempted to become dual champions by going after the tag team champions in a three-way match, but were uninvolved in the outcome. In another encounter between Puro Macho and Team Savio/IWA, he was hit with an object and pinned. After Vega left WWL, Electro faced a remnant of the invading team in Noel Rodríguez (initially supposed to be Jesús Castillo Jr.) as part of a series of hardcore matches.

Electro joined Puro Macho when the group made a surprise appearance at Hugo Savinovich's MysterioManía: Tributo al Mesías where IWA-PR officially announced its return to the wrestling scene. This new confrontation with Savio Vega marked the beginning of a transition for the stable, which nonetheless decided to close up their storylines at WWL by appearing in the season closing event. At Black Xmas, he won a four-way match to determine the new first contender for the WWL World Heavyweight Championship (besting Ferno, Mr. Big and Apolo), unsuccessfully challenging incumbent BJ later in the event. Electro made his final in-ring appearance of 2018 at Championship Wrestling Association's Christmas Showdown, defeating Shane Strickland and Lynx in a three-way match.

=== IWA (2019–2022) ===
At IWA, Puro Macho continued immersed in a feud to dispose of the IWA originals. As part of this, a single space for the stable was opened in a four-way match to crown a new IWA World Heavyweight Champion. Electro revealed his interest to Khriz "The Chosen", while Mr. Big did the same on his part. Caught in an unsalvageable situation, Ferno declined to name a contender, allowing Director of Talent Relations Dennis Rivera to choose Electro in his stead (hoping that this would breach the team's chemistry). Ultimately, Mr. Big was also allowed to participate after Shane Sewell surrendered his spot. To open Impacto Total: El Tour he joined Puro Macho in giving Team IWA a beat down. On January 12, 2019, Electro won the IWA World Heavyweight Championship by pinning Mr. Big in the four-way match, in the process angering his stablemate. On the final night of the tour, this development brought consequences when the latter turned on Puro Macho and helped Team IWA win the contention, he also remained outside the ring while the stable was assaulted.

== Championships and accomplishments ==
- International Wrestling Association
  - IWA World Heavyweight Championship (1 time)
  - IWA/IWE Intercontinental Championship (2 times)
- World Wrestling League
  - WWL World Trios Championship (1 time)
