= Stefano (wrestler) =

Puerto Rican professional wrestler

Personal information
- Born: Daniel García Soto Brooklyn, New York

Professional wrestling career
- Ring name(s): Stefano; Xtefy
- Billed height: 5 ft 10 in (1.78 m)
- Billed weight: 221 lb (100 kg)
- Trained by: Isaac Rosario
- Debut: 2000

Daniel García Soto is a Puerto Rican professional wrestler best known by his ring name Stefano.

Soto wrestles for promotions across Puerto Rico including International Wrestling Association, World Wrestling Council and New Wrestling Stars. Soto would also make an appearance in America's Total Nonstop Action Wrestling as a storyline lawyer for The Latin American Xchange faction.

Soto also became one of the first wrestlers in Puerto Rican Wrestling to win the triple-crown of the three different Puerto Rican jr. heavyweight titles after winning IWA's Jr. Heavyweight, WWC's Jr. Heavyweight (5 November 2005), and finally NWS Cruiserweight title; which he won on 10 September 2006. After almost a year in WWC, Stefy returned to the IWA in 2008 under his Rabia character and renamed as Xtefy.

== Championships and accomplishments ==
- International Wrestling Association
  - IWA Hardcore Championship (5 times)
  - IWA World Junior Heavyweight Championship (3 times)
  - IWA World Tag Team Championship (1 time) – with Chicano
- New Wrestling Stars
  - NWS Cruiserweight Championship (1 time)
- World Wrestling Council
  - WWC World Junior Heavyweight Championship (2 times)
- World Wrestling League
  - WWL World Trios Championship (1 time) – with Noel Rodriguez and Dennis Rivera

== See also ==
- Professional wrestling in Puerto Rico
