= IWA Puerto Rico Heavyweight Championship =

Details
- Promotion: International Wrestling Association
- Date established: June 16, 2008
- Date retired: August 7, 2011

The IWA Puerto Rico Heavyweight Championship ("Campeonato de Puerto Rico Peso Completo de la IWA" in Spanish), was a secondary championship defended in the International Wrestling Association of Puerto Rico (IWA-PR).

== History ==
Championship was announced on June 16, 2008 via IWA's website then on IWA's TV Show Impacto Total. The title was shown to the public on June 28, 2008 by IWA's Promoter Edwin Vázquez Ortega at Yabucoa, Puerto Rico then it was announced that the inaugural champion was going to be decided in a Tournament.

The inaugural tournament took place at three dates: On July 5, 2008 at San Juan, Puerto Rico then On July 12, 2008 at Bayamón, Puerto Rico and the final on the Summer Attitude live event on July 19, 2008 at Bayamon, Puerto Rico.

On September 6, 2008 at Armagedón show in Bayamón, the title changed hands in a Tag Team Match, where the IWA Hardcore Championship was also on the line. in the match El Bacano & Vengador Boricua defeated Zaeir Arafat (IWA-Hardcore) & Hardam Kadafi (IWA-PR) to win those titles respectly.

On October 4, 2008 at Golpe de Estado show the IWA Hardcore and IWA World Cruiserweight Championships were unified to this title and the new champion was Noel Rodríguez who defeated Zaer Arafat, Rick Stanley, Hardam Kadafi, Spectro, Manson, Rainstein, Onix and Niche in an Elimination Match.

On April 3, 2010 the championship was defended outside Puerto Rico for the first time when Q. T. Marshall defeated Ray Beez on I Believe in Wrestling live Event Believe XVI on Florida, United States.

On November 20, 2010, Triple Mega Champion Dennis Rivera was stripped of the title by IWA's president Miguel Pérez Jr. as he had not defended it in almost 2 months

== Inaugural tournament ==
First Round (07/05 - San Juan)
Hardam Kadafi	W
Angel
Onix	W
Escorpión
Vengador Boricua	W
Eli Rodríguez
Zaeir Arafat	W
Joseph RPM

Semifinals (07/12 - Bayamón)
Hardam Kadafi	W
Onix
Vengador Boricua	W
Zaeir Arafat

Final (07/19 - Bayamón)
Hardam Kadafi	W
Vengador Boricua

== Title history ==
†	Indicates title reigns and changes not recognized by IWA.

#	Wrestlers	Reign	Date	Days held	Location	Event	Notes	Ref
1	Hardam Kadafi	1	July 19, 2008	49	Bayamón, Puerto Rico	Summer Attitude (2008)	Defeated Vengador Boricua in a tournament final to become the inaugural champion.	
2	Vengador Boricua	1	September 6, 2008	7	Bayamón, Puerto Rico	Armagedón (2008)	Won a Tag Team Match with Bacano where this title and IWA Hardcore title were on the line	
3	Hardam Kadafi	2	September 13, 2008	21	Bayamón, Puerto Rico	IWA TV Taping		
4	Noel Rodríguez	1	October 4, 2008	69	Bayamón, Puerto Rico	Golpe de Estado (2008)	Defeated Zaier Arafat and others in a 7-Man Elimination Match	
5	Chris Joel	1	December 12, 2008	64	Yauco, Puerto Rico	Christmas in PR (2008)	w/ Chicano Defeated Noel Rodriguez and Black Devil in a Tag Team Match	
6	Rick Stanley	1	February 14, 2009	63	Bayamón, Puerto Rico	Noche de Campeones (2009)		
7	Chris Joel	2	April 18, 2009	120	Bayamón, Puerto Rico	Extreme Major		
8	El Bacano	1	August 16, 2009	118	Cataño, Puerto Rico	Golpe de Estado (2009)		
9	El Chicano	1	December 12, 2009	1	Bayamón, Puerto Rico			
—	Vacated	—	December 13, 2009	—		IWA TV Taping	After El Chicano left IWA-PR.	
10	Ricky Cruzz	1	January 30, 2010	49	Levittown, Puerto Rico	La Noche Donde Nada Es Lo Que Parece	Defeated Bacano, Bolo The Red Bulldog, Zaer Arafat and Romeo in a Rumble Hardcore Match	
11	Q. T. Marshall	1	March 20, 2010	56	Las Piedras, Puerto Rico	Copa Alcalde Las Piedras	QT stole the title and proclaimed himself champion after losing.	
†	Ricky Cruzz	1 ^{(2)}	May 15, 2010	0	Bayamón, Puerto Rico	IWA TV Taping	Defeat Q.T. Marshall for the IWA Puerto Rico Heavyweight Championship only.	
†	Q.T. Marshall	1 ^{(2)}	May 15, 2010	63	Bayamón, Puerto Rico	IWA TV Taping	The title has been returned.	
12	Bryan Danielson	1	July 17, 2010	75	Bayamón, Puerto Rico	Summer Attitude (2010)	In August 2010, Danielson signed with WWE and returned to his role as Daniel Bryan, becoming the first contender for the WWE United States Championship. He was allowed to complete his contracted dates, including a scheduled return to IWA-PR where he would defend the title.	
13	Dennis Rivera	1	September 10, 2010	86	Yabucoa, Puerto Rico	Golpe de Estado (2010)		
—	Vacated	—	November 20, 2010	—	Lajas, Puerto Rico	IWA TV Taping	Stripped by IWA-PR's president Miguel Pérez for failure to defend.	
14	Noel Rodríguez	2	December 5, 2010	48	Bayamón, Puerto Rico	Christmas in PR (2010)	Defeated Spectro to become new champion	
15	Damian	1	January 22, 2011	35	Aguas Buenas, Puerto Rico	IWA TV Taping		
—	Unified	—	February 26, 2011	—	Yabucoa, Puerto Rico	IWA TV Taping	The IWA Caribbean Championship was unified to this title	
16	Xix Xavant	1	February 26, 2011	162	Yabucoa, Puerto Rico	IWA TV Taping	Defeated Damian to become IWA Unified Puerto Rico Champion	
—	Deactivated	—	August 7, 2011	—	—	—		

== Combined reigns ==
Rank	Wrestler	No. of reigns	Combined days
1	Chris Joel	2	184
3	Xix Xavant	1	162
4	Q. T. Marshall	2	119
5	El Bacano	1	118
6	Noel Rodriguez	2	117
7	Dennis Rivera	1	86
8	Bryan Danielson	1	75
9	Hardam Kadafi	2	70
10	Rick Stanley	1	63
11	Ricky Cruzz	2	49
12	Damian	1	35
13	Vengador Boricua	1	7
14	Chicano	1	1>
