= IWA Hardcore Championship =

Details
- Promotion: International Wrestling Association
- Date established: 2000
- Date retired: 2008 & 2012
Statistics
- First champion: Andrés Borges
- Most reigns: Huracan Castillo (12 reigns)
- Longest reign: Slash Venom (235 days)
- Shortest reign: Rest of the wrestlers (Less on 1 day)

IWA Hardcore Championship was a title contested under hardcore wrestling rules (with the application of the 24/7 rules) in the International Wrestling Association in Puerto Rico. On October 4, 2008, the title was unified with the IWA Puerto Rico Heavyweight Championship.

== Title history (2000–2008, 2012) ==
The first IWA Hardcore Champion was crowned on a 20 Minute Limit Hardcore Match and wrestlers that took part of it were Huracán Castillo Jr., Pain, Miguel Pérez Jr., Ninjitzu, Ricky Banderas, Apolo, TNT (Hombre Dinamita), Super Crazy, Tajiri, Chicky Starr, Victor the Bodyguard, Vyzago (Brett Sanders), Andy Anderson, Taka Michinoku, Andrés Borges and Sean Hill

Wrestler:	Times:	Date:	Location:	Events:	Notes:	Ref:
Andrés Borges	1	November 25, 2000	Trujillo Alto, Puerto Rico	IWA TV Taping	Pinned Taka Michinoku to become the first champion.	
Super Crazy	1	November 25, 2000	Trujillo Alto, Puerto Rico	IWA TV Taping	24/7 Rules.	
Ninjitzu	1	November 25, 2000	Trujillo Alto, Puerto Rico	IWA TV Taping	24/7 Rules.	
Chicky Starr	1	November 25, 2000	Trujillo Alto, Puerto Rico	IWA TV Taping	24/7 Rules.	
Miguel Pérez, Jr.	1	November 25, 2000	Trujillo Alto, Puerto Rico	IWA TV Taping	24/7 Rules.	
Tajiri	1	November 25, 2000	Trujillo Alto, Puerto Rico	IWA TV Taping	24/7 Rules.	
Huracán Castillo	1	November 25, 2000	Trujillo Alto, Puerto Rico	IWA TV Taping	All changes above took place in a 20 Minute Limit Hardcore match.	
Faraón Zaruxx	1	June 2, 2001	Bayamón, Puerto Rico	Impacto Total	Won with help from Pete Gas and Chaz	
Vyzago	1	June 3, 2001	Peñuelas, Puerto Rico			
Vacated		June 15, 2001	Peñuelas, Puerto Rico			
Hombre Dinamita	1	June 16, 2001	Bayamón, Puerto Rico	IWA TV Taping	Defeated Faraón Zaruxx to become new champion.	
Stripped		June 23, 2001	Bayamón, Puerto Rico		The title was stripped by Heriberto López after El Hombre Dinamita attacked him and Dutch Mantel.	
Faraón Zaruxx	2	June 23, 2001	Bayamón, Puerto Rico		Zaruxx Defeated El Hombre Dinamita by forfeit as Commissioner Mantel ordered El Hombre Dinamita to defend the title or be stripped.	
Super Crazy	2	July 21, 2001	Levittown, Puerto Rico			
N.Y. Rican Baldie	1	July 21, 2001	Levittown, Puerto Rico			
Crash Holly	1	July 27, 2001	Bayamón, Puerto Rico	Summer Attitude (2001)	Defeated N.Y. Rican Baldie in a 24/7 rule and later Defeated Super Crazy for the IWA Hardcore and IWA/UWA Unified World Junior Heavyweight titles.	
Super Crazy	3	July 28, 2001	Carolina, Puerto Rico	Summer Attitude (2001)	Defeated Crash Holly and "El Lobo" Andy Anderson in a 3-way match for the IWA Hardcore and IWA/UWA Unified World Junior Heavyweight titles.	
N.Y. Rican Baldie	2	July 29, 2001	Levittown, Puerto Rico			
Faraón Zaruxx	3	August 3, 2001	Cayey, Puerto Rico	IWA TV Taping	Defeated N.Y. Rican Baldie and Super Crazy in a 3-way match.	
Diabólico	1	August 3, 2001	Cayey, Puerto Rico	IWA TV Taping	24/7 Rules.	
Stefano	1	August 3, 2001	Cayey, Puerto Rico	IWA TV Taping	24/7 Rules.	
N.Y. Rican Baldie	3	August 3, 2001	Cayey, Puerto Rico	IWA TV Taping	24/7 Rules.	
Super Crazy	4	August 4, 2001	Levittown, Puerto Rico	IWA TV Taping		
Paparazzi	1	August 4, 2001	Levittown, Puerto Rico	IWA TV Taping	24/7 Rules.	
Stefano	2	August 4, 2001	Levittown, Puerto Rico	IWA TV Taping	24/7 Rules.	
N.Y. Rican Baldie	4	August 4, 2001	Levittown, Puerto Rico	IWA TV Taping	Diabolico, Abbad among others tried to win the title but failed. 24/7 Rules.	
Tommy Diablo	1	August 10, 2001	Manatí, Puerto Rico			
Diabólico	2	August 10, 2001	Manatí, Puerto Rico			
Stefano	3	August 10, 2001	Manatí, Puerto Rico			
Paparazzi	2	August 10, 2001	Manatí, Puerto Rico			
N.Y. Rican Baldie	5	August 10, 2001	Manatí, Puerto Rico			
Stefano	4	August 11, 2001	Levittown, Puerto Rico	IWA TV Taping		
Eric Alexander	1	August 11, 2001	Levittown, Puerto Rico	IWA TV Taping		
N.Y. Rican Baldie	6	August 11, 2001	Levittown, Puerto Rico	IWA TV Taping		
Glamour Boy Shane	1	August 18, 2001	Levittown, Puerto Rico	Zona Caliente		
N.Y. Rican Baldie	7	August 25, 2001	Bayamón, Puerto Rico			
Glamour Boy Shane	2	August 25, 2001	Levittown, Puerto Rico			
Agente Bruno	1	August 31, 2001	Manatí, Puerto Rico			
Glamour Boy Shane	3	August 31, 2001	Manatí, Puerto Rico			
Big Russ McCullough	1	September 1, 2001	Gurabo, Puerto Rico			
Faraón Zaruxx	4	September 1, 2001	Gurabo, Puerto Rico			
Apolo	1	September 2, 2001	San Sebastian, Puerto Rico			
N.Y. Rican Baldie	8	September 8, 2001	Bayamón, Puerto Rico	IWA TV Taping	Faraon Zaruxx was the champion at this date but unclear when he won it. Defeated Shane, Tommy Dreamer & Zaruxx	
Tommy Dreamer	1	September 8, 2001	Bayamón, Puerto Rico	IWA TV Taping	24/7 Rules.	
Glamour Boy Shane	4	September 8, 2001	Bayamón, Puerto Rico	IWA TV Taping	24/7 Rules.	
"El Lobo" Andy Anderson	1	September 29, 2001	Bayamón, Puerto Rico			
Pulgarcito	1	October 27, 2001	Bayamón, Puerto Rico			
Stefano	5	October 27, 2001	Bayamón, Puerto Rico			
"El Lobo" Andy Anderson	2	October 27, 2001	Bayamón, Puerto Rico			
Anarchy	1	November 17, 2001	Humacao, Puerto Rico	IWA TV Taping	Defeated Andy Anderson & Fujita in a Triple Threat Match. 24/7 Rules	
Super Crazy	5	November 24, 2001	Bayamón, Puerto Rico	II Bruiser Brody Memorial Cup Weekend	20 Man Hardcore Battle Royal, Super Crazy won by last eliminating Andy Anderson	
Chicano	1	January 12, 2002	Cayey, Puerto Rico			
Super Crazy	6	January 12, 2002	Cayey, Puerto Rico			
Huracán Castillo	2	February 2, 2002	Bayamón, Puerto Rico		Defeated Super Crazy and Agente Bruno in a 3-way match.	
Super Crazy	7	February 2, 2002	Bayamón, Puerto Rico		Also Defeated Eddie Guerrero to become the first IWA Intercontinental Heavyweight Championship on February 23, 2002 in Philadelphia, Pennsylvania.	
Huracán Castillo	3	March 2, 2002	Bayamón, Puerto Rico			
Super Crazy	8	June 2, 2002	Toa Baja, Puerto Rico			
Huracán Castillo	4	June 2, 2002	Toa Baja, Puerto Rico			
Ozzie (Ashley Hudson)	1	June 3, 2002	Levittown, Puerto Rico			
Huracán Castillo	5	June 15, 2002	Bayamón, Puerto Rico		Defeated Ozzie and Super Crazy in 3-way match.	
Super Crazy	9	June 15, 2002	Bayamón, Puerto Rico			
Anarchy	2	June 15, 2002	Bayamón, Puerto Rico			
Agente Bruno	2	June 15, 2002	Bayamón, Puerto Rico			
Huracán Castillo	6	July 13, 2002	Carolina, Puerto Rico	Summer Attitude (2002)	Defeated Agente Bruno and Dragon Makabe	
Agente Bruno	3	August 15, 2002	Guayama, Puerto Rico	IWA TV Taping	Won with help from Chicano. 24/7 Rules	
Huracán Castillo	7	August 15, 2002	Guayama, Puerto Rico	IWA TV Taping	Won with help from Miguel Perez Jr. 24/7 Rules	
Agente Bruno	4	August 17, 2002	Isabela, Puerto Rico	IWA TV Taping		
Huracán Castillo	8	August 17, 2002	Isabela, Puerto Rico	IWA TV Taping	Won with help from Miguel Perez Jr. 24/7 Rules	
Anarchy	3	August 23, 2002	Hatillo, Puerto Rico	IWA TV Taping	Defeated Badwrench. 24/7 Rules.	
Chicano	2	August 23, 2002	Hatillo, Puerto Rico	IWA TV Taping	24/7 Rules.	
Huracán Castillo	9	August 23, 2002	Hatillo, Puerto Rico	IWA TV Taping	24/7 Rules.	
Kevin Kelly (Kevin Landry)	1	August 24, 2002	Toa Baja, Puerto Rico	IWA TV Taping	During the Match (Huracan vs Skull) he interneved and won the title	
Huracán Castillo	10	August 24, 2002	Toa Baja, Puerto Rico	IWA TV Taping	Skull and Kevin Kelly were arguing when Huracan took advantage and won the title back	
Badwrench	1	September 7, 2002	Aguas Buenas, Puerto Rico			
Eric Alexander	2	September 15, 2002	Manatí, Puerto Rico	Golpe de Estado (2002)	24/7 Rules.	
Badwrench	2	September 15, 2002	Manatí, Puerto Rico	Golpe de Estado (2002)	24/7 Rules.	
Anarchy	4	September 21, 2002	Toa Baja, Puerto Rico	IWA TV Taping	24/7 Rules.	
Badwrench	3	September 21, 2002	Toa Baja, Puerto Rico	IWA TV Taping	24/7 Rules.	
Eric Alexander	3	September 28, 2002	Bayamón, Puerto Rico	IWA TV Taping	After the Match (Diabolico vs Badwrench) concluded, he attacked Badwrench and won the title	
Badwrench	4	September 28, 2002	Bayamón, Puerto Rico	IWA TV Taping	Chicano tried to attack Eric Alexander but couldn't, meanwhile he was distracted, Badwrench won the title back	
Super Mark	1	October 6, 2002	Yauco, Puerto Rico	IWA TV Taping	Chicano and Badwrench were hit with the ring bell by Huracan Castillo so he took advantage and won the title	
Chicano	3	October 6, 2002	Yauco, Puerto Rico	IWA TV Taping	24/7 Rules.	
Badwrench	5	October 6, 2002	Yauco, Puerto Rico	IWA TV Taping	24/7 Rules.	
Huracán Castillo	11	October 19, 2002	Bayamón, Puerto Rico	IWA TV Taping	Listed previously as won on October 20 on Juana Diaz, PR but unclear	
Abyss	1	November 2, 2002	Bayamón, Puerto Rico	IWA TV Taping	Won with the help from Flash Venom (Slash Venom)	
Eric Alexander	4	November 23, 2002	Carolina, Puerto Rico	IWA TV Taping		
Abyss	2	November 23, 2002	Carolina, Puerto Rico	IWA TV Taping	Eric was arguing with Angel Rodriguez while Abyss took advantage and won the title back.	
Huracán Castillo	12	November 29, 2002	Humacao, Puerto Rico	Hardcore Weekend (2002)		
Abyss	3	November 29, 2002	Humacao, Puerto Rico	Hardcore Weekend (2002)		
Ricky Banderas	1	November 30, 2002	Bayamón, Puerto Rico	Hardcore Weekend (2002)		
Glamour Boy Shane	5	April 20, 2003	Cabo Rojo, Puerto Rico	IWA TV Taping		
Ricky Banderas	2	April 20, 2003	Cabo Rojo, Puerto Rico	IWA TV Taping		
Apolo	2	May 24, 2003	Manatí, Puerto Rico	IWA TV Taping		
Ricky Banderas	3	May 24, 2003	Manatí, Puerto Rico	IWA TV Taping	24/7 Rules.	
Víctor The Bodyguard	1	June 1, 2003	Bayamón, Puerto Rico			
Glamour Boy Shane	6	June 15, 2003	Bayamón, Puerto Rico	IWA TV Taping	Defeated Ricky Banderas, Miguel Pérez, Jr. and Victor The Body Guard in a fatal 4-way match.	
Ricky Banderas	4	June 21, 2003	Cayey, Puerto Rico	IWA TV Taping	24/7 Rules.	
Vampiro	1	July 12, 2003	San Juan, Puerto Rico	Summer Attitude (2003)		
Ricky Banderas	5	July 12, 2003	San Juan, Puerto Rico	Summer Attitude (2003)	Also Defeated Chicano for the IWA Intercontinental Heavyweight Championship on July 26, 2003 in Bayamón, Puerto Rico.	
Vampiro	2	September 13, 2003	Carolina, Puerto Rico	Golpe de Estado (2003)	Tables, Ladders & Chairs Match with the title hanging over 20 feet in the air	
Ricky Banderas	6	October 7, 2003	Kissimmee, Florida	Total Impact Live!		
Vampiro	3	October 7, 2003	Kissimmee, Florida	Total Impact Live!	Apolo wanted to face new champion Banderas but he was unaware of Vampiro and he attacked him and won the title back	
Slash Venom	1	November 16, 2003	Yauco, Puerto Rico	IWA TV Taping		
Vampiro	4	December 11, 2003	Manatí, Puerto Rico	Christmas in PR (2003)		
Slash Venom	2	January 24, 2004	Cabo Rojo, Puerto Rico	IWA TV Taping		
Victor The Bodyguard	2	February 28, 2004	Bayamón, Puerto Rico	IWA TV Taping	La Compañía attacked Slash Venom and Victor The Bodyguard declared himself the new IWA Hardcore Champion.	
Slash Venom	3	April 4, 2004	San Germán, Puerto Rico			
Held Up		June 20, 2004	Yauco, Puerto Rico	IWA TV Taping	Title was vacated due to Victor the Bodyguard passed away by heart attack during a IWA event	
Buffalo Bison	1	July 16, 2004	Ponce, Puerto Rico	Summer Attitude (2004)	Defeated Slash Venom for the vacant title.	
Slash Venom	4	July 16, 2004	Ponce, Puerto Rico	Summer Attitude (2004)		
Chet Jablonski	1	August 14, 2004	Bayamón, Puerto Rico	IWA TV Taping	Title awarded by Ray Gonzalez and "La Familia del Milenio".	
Ricky Banderas	7	August 14, 2004	Bayamón, Puerto Rico	IWA TV Taping		
Chet Jablonski	2	September 25, 2004	Bayamón, Puerto Rico	IWA TV Taping	TLC Match. 24/7 Rules	
Chicano	4	October 23, 2004	Levittown, Puerto Rico	IWA TV Taping	24/7 Rules.	
Ricky Banderas	8	November 20, 2004	Bayamón, Puerto Rico	Hardcore Weekend (2004)	20 Man "Boricua Rumble". Won by last eliminating Slash Venom	
Hangman Hughes	1	February 11, 2005	Arecibo, Puerto Rico			
Ricky Banderas	9	February 12, 2005	Caguas, Puerto Rico			
Hangman Hughes	2	February 25, 2005	Gurabo, Puerto Rico	IWA TV Taping		
Ricky Banderas	10	March 11, 2005	Fajardo, Puerto Rico			
Slash Venom	5	March 13, 2005	Toa Baja, Puerto Rico		Also Defeated Chicano for the IWA World Heavyweight Championship on August 20, 2005 in Aguas Buenas, Puerto Rico.	
Aaron Stevens	1	November 3, 2005	Gurabo, Puerto Rico	Hardcore Weekend (2005)	Won a 12-man extreme battle royal.	
Jimmy Snuka Jr.	1	November 4, 2005	Moca, Puerto Rico	Hardcore Weekend (2005)	Won a 13-man extreme battle royal.	
Slash Venom	6	November 5, 2005	Carolina, Puerto Rico	Hardcore Weekend (2005)	Won a 20-man extreme battle royal.	
Mr. Big	1	February 18, 2006	Toa Baja, Puerto Rico	IWA TV Taping	Handed to Big by Savio Vega after Slash Venom lost a match against Noriega.	
Cruzz	1	March 18, 2006	Bayamón, Puerto Rico			
Balls Mahoney	1	April 1, 2006	Caguas, Puerto Rico	Juicio Final VI	Defeated Cruzz and Chicano in a 3-way Ladder match.	
Chicano	5	April 15, 2006	Caguas, Puerto Rico	Apocalipsis		
Bad Boy Bradley	1	May 14, 2006	Bayamón, Puerto Rico			
Chicano	6	June 17, 2006	Bayamón, Puerto Rico	Summer Attitude (2006)	Defeated Bad Boy Bradley in a Lumberjack match.	
Mr. Big	2	August 5, 2006	Bayamón, Puerto Rico	IWA TV Taping		
Super Mark	2	October 22, 2006	Bayamón, Puerto Rico	Impacto Total	24/7 Rules introduced again. Super Mark attacked Big Backstage.	
Joe Bravo	1	October 28, 2006	Aguas Buenas, Puerto Rico	Impacto Total	Defeated Super Mark in a 2 referees match.	
Super Mark	3	October 28, 2006	Aguas Buenas, Puerto Rico	Impacto Total	24/7 Rules.	
Blitz	1	October 28, 2006	Aguas Buenas, Puerto Rico	Impacto Total	24/7 Rules.	
Amazona	1	November 18, 2006	Carolina, Puerto Rico	Impacto Total	24/7 Rules. First female to win the IWA Hardcore Championship. It Aired on 11/18	
"El Hombre Bestia" Angel	1	November 18, 2006	Carolina, Puerto Rico	Armagedon (2006)	24/7 Rules.	
Hiram Túa	1	November 25, 2006	Levittown, Puerto Rico	Impacto Total	Match was Angel vs Bolo The Red Bulldog but Tua intervened and won the title	
"El Hombre Bestia" Angel	2	December 2, 2006	Levittown, Puerto Rico	Antesala a Christmas in PR	Defeated Hiram Túa and Bolo The Red Bulldog in a 3-way match.	
Diabólico	4	December 10, 2006	San Sebastian, Puerto Rico	Christmas in PR (2006)		
"El Hombre Bestia" Angel	3	December 10, 2006	San Sebastian, Puerto Rico	Christmas in PR (2006)		
Super Mark	4	December 16, 2006	Yabucoa, Puerto Rico	IWA TV Taping		
"El Hombre Bestia" Angel	4	December 16, 2006	Yabucoa, Puerto Rico	IWA TV Taping		
Hiram Túa	2	January 27, 2007	Bayamón, Puerto Rico	La Tercera Guerra	Defeated Tommy Diablo, "El Hombre Bestia" Angel and Barbie Boy in a 4-way elimination match.	
Bolo The Red Bulldog	1	February 10, 2007	Bayamón, Puerto Rico	Revelaciones		
Gustavo Rodríguez	1	May 11, 2007	Yabucoa, Puerto Rico	Juicio Final VII	Tag Team Match where he and Chicky Starr defeated Bolo The Red Bulldog and Shaka El Truckero	
Shaka El Truckero	1	May 26, 2007	Caguas, Puerto Rico	Impacto Total		
Noel Rodríguez	1	June 15, 2007	Villalba, Puerto Rico	I Copa Jose Miguel Perez		
Vacated		September 2, 2007	Yabucoa, Puerto Rico	NWA Weekend		
"El Hombre Bestia" Angel	5	September 15, 2007	Toa Baja, Puerto Rico	Golpe de Estado (2007)	Won a battle royal.	
Tommy Diablo	3	September 29, 2007	Caguas, Puerto Rico	En Ruta al Oro		
Bolo The Red Bulldog	2	December 15, 2007	Bayamón, Puerto Rico	Christmas In PR (2007)		
Onix	1	April 19, 2008	Caguas, Puerto Rico	En Ruta a Juicio Final VIII		
Bolo The Red Bulldog	3	May 17, 2008	Bayamón, Puerto Rico	Juicio Final VIII	Defeated Onix in a chain match.	
Rick Stanley	1	June 14, 2008	Bayamón, Puerto Rico	III Copa Jose Miguel Perez		
"El Hombre Bestia" Angel	6	June 28, 2008	Yabucoa, Puerto Rico	IWA TV Taping	Defeated Rick Stanley and Erik Escorpion in a 3-way match.	
Erik Escorpion	1	July 19, 2008	Bayamón, Puerto Rico	Summer Attitude (2008)	Defeated "El Hombre Bestia" Angel, Death Cold and Joseph RPM in a 4-way match.	
Raymond Sales	1	July 19, 2008	Bayamón, Puerto Rico	Summer Attitude (2008)	24/7 Rules	
Payaso Totín	1	July 19, 2008	Bayamón, Puerto Rico	Summer Attitude (2008)	24/7 Rules	
Zaer Arafat	1	August 16, 2008	Bayamón, Puerto Rico	Road to Armagedon	24/7 Rules	
El Bacano	1	September 6, 2008	Bayamón, Puerto Rico	Armagedon (2008)	Won a tag team match with El Vengador Boricua to defeat Los Árabes for the IWA Hardcore and Puerto Rico Heavyweight titles	
Zaer Arafat	2	September 6, 2008	Bayamón, Puerto Rico	Armagedon (2008)	After the match ended, he wins the title back with the help of Hardam Kadafi (24/7 Rules)	
Niche	1	September 27, 2008	Levittown, Puerto Rico	Ruta a Golpe de Estado	24/7 Rules	
Noel Rodríguez	2	October 4, 2008	Bayamón, Puerto Rico	Golpe de Estado (2008)	Defeated El Niche, Onix, Rain Stein, Giant Manson, Spectro, Hardam Kadafi, Rick Stanley and Zaer Arafat in a 9-way elimination match for the IWA Hardcore, Extreme Cruiserweight and Puerto Rico Heavyweight titles.	
Unified		October 4, 2008	Bayamón, Puerto Rico	Golpe de Estado (2008)	Title was unified with the IWA Extreme Cruiserweight and the IWA Puerto Rico Heavyweight titles.	
Crazy Louis	1	February 11, 2012	Toa Alta, Puerto Rico	Kaos and Odissey	Defeated Rahid Zahid, Teakyon, Siniestro, Cyrus, Tanú and Psycho for the reactivated title in a 7-man elimination match.	
Psycho	1	February 11, 2012	Toa Alta, Puerto Rico	Kaos and Odissey	"Interim" General Manager Jaycobs helped Psycho distracting Crazy Louis using new 24/7 Rules after the match ended.	
Crazy Louis	2	March 17, 2012	Santurce, Puerto Rico	Clash of the Titans		
Destro	1	March 17, 2012	Santurce, Puerto Rico	Clash of the Titans	With the help of Maximo, Destro beat both opponents after the match ended (24/7 Rules)	
Crazy Louis	3	April 14, 2012	Santurce, Puerto Rico	Payback	Defeated Destro and Psycho in a 3-way match.	
Slayer (Syler Andrews)	1	May 19, 2012	Santurce, Puerto Rico	Antesala VII Copa Jose Miguel Perez		
Crazy Louis	4	May 19, 2012	Santurce, Puerto Rico	Antesala VII Copa Jose Miguel Perez	Defeated Slayer, Psycho & "El Apostador" Jack Daniels in a 4-way match to retain the title.	
Slayer (Syler Andrews)	2	May 19, 2012	Santurce, Puerto Rico	Antesala VII Copa Jose Miguel Perez	After losing in a Fatal 4-Way against Crazy Louis, Psycho & "El Apostador" Jack Daniels later attacked and pinned Crazy Louis in a parking brawl after card ended (24/7 rules).	
Crazy Louis	5	May 26, 2012	Cataño, Puerto Rico	VII Copa Jose Miguel Perez		
Deactivated		June 16, 2012			When IWA closed.	

== Combined reigns ==
Rank	Wrestler	No. of reigns	Combined days
1	Ricky Banderas	10	449
2	Slash Venom	6	400
3	Huracán Castillo	12	351
4	Bolo The Red Bulldog	5	244
5	Victor The Bodyguard	2	127
6	Vampiro	4	108
7	Chicano	6	106
7	Mr. Big	2	106
8	Super Crazy	9	98
8	"El Hombre Bestia" Angel	6	98
9	Noel Rodríguez	2	79
10	Tommy Diablo	3	77
11	Crazy Louis	5	56
12	"El Lobo" Andy Anderson	2	49
13	Badwrench	5	42
14	Glamour Boy Shane	6	41
15	Faraón Zaruxx	4	36
16	Zaer Arafat	2	35
16	Psycho	1	35
17	Bad Boy Brdley	1	34
18	N.Y. Rican Baldie	8	28
18	Agente Bruno (Daniel González)	4	28
18	Abyss	3	28
18	Onix	1	28
18	Payaso Totín	1	28
18	Destro	1	28
19	Hiram Túa	2	21
20	Shaka El Truckero	1	20
21	Hangman Hughes	2	15
21	Bison Smith	1	15
21	Gustavo Rodríguez	1	15
22	Ricky Cruzz	1	14
22	Balls Mahoney	1	14
22	Rick Stanley	1	14
22	Niche	1	14
23	Vyzago (Brett Sanders)	1	12
23	Ozzie (Ashley Hudson)	1	12
24	Anarchy	4	7
24	Slayer (Syler Andrews)	2	7
24	Hombre Dinamita	1	7
25	Super Mark	3	6
25	Apolo	2	6
26	Crash Holly	1	1
26	Aaron Stevens	1	1
26	Jimmy Snuka Jr.	1	1
27	Stefano	5	<1
27	Diabólico	4	<1
27	Eric Alexander	4	<1
27	Paparazzi	2	<1
27	Chet Jablonski	2	<1
27	Andrés Borges	1	<1
27	Ninjitzu	1	<1
27	Chicky Starr	1	<1
27	Miguel Pérez	1	<1
27	Tajiri	1	<1
27	Abbad	1	<1
27	Big Russ McCullough	1	<1
27	Pulgarcito	1	<1
27	Kevin Kelly (Kevin Landry)	1	<1
27	Joe Bravo	1	<1
27	Blitz	1	<1
27	Amazona	1	<1
27	Erik Escorpion	1	<1
27	Raymond Sales	1	<1
27	Bacano	1	<1
