= Flash Flanagan =

American professional wrestler

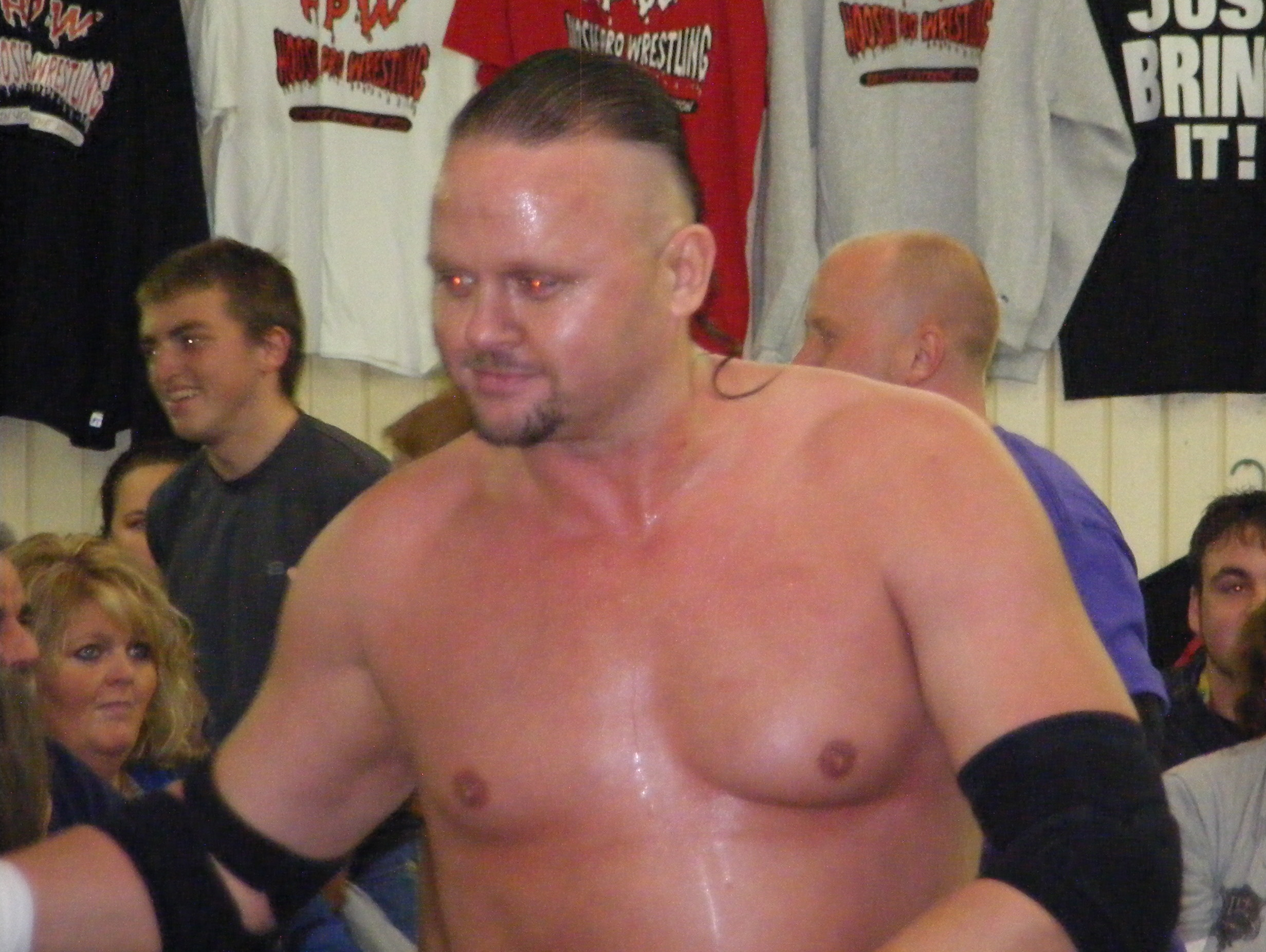
- Flanagan in 2011

Personal information
- Born: Christopher Kindred; April 6, 1974 (age 52) Indianapolis, Indiana, US

Professional wrestling career
- Ring name(s): Flash Flanagan; Gregor Falcon; Kobain; Slash Venom
- Billed height: 6 ft 2 in (188 cm)
- Billed weight: 231 lb (105 kg)
- Billed from: Indianapolis, Indiana
- Debut: 1992

Christopher Kindred (born April 6, 1974) is an American professional wrestler. He is currently performs on the independent circuit. He is best known for his time in World Wrestling Entertainment (WWE), Total Nonstop Action Wrestling (TNA), Ohio Valley Wrestling (OVW) and the briefly appears for Ring of Honor (ROH). He is also known for his time in International Wrestling Association (IWA), and is best known by his ring names Flash Flanagan and Slash Venom.

== Professional wrestling career ==
Early in his career, Kindred formed a team with Wolfie D, known as The Blacksheep. Flanagan also formed teams with Billy Travis, Nick Dinsmore, and Steven Dunn. Flanagan wrestled one match on WWF Monday Night Raw losing to Brian Christopher; he then wrestled 3 matches in 1999 on WWF Shotgun Saturday Night all in losing efforts. From 1999 to 2002, he was signed to a developmental deal with the WWF/WWE. After being released from WWE, he worked in NWA:TNA as Kobain in The Disciples of the New Church with former partner Wolfie D (Slash). After TNA, he wrestled under the name Slash Venon in IWA Puerto Rico. In 2005, he briefly wrestled in Ring of Honor. He now wrestles on the southeast independent circuit, mainly in United States Wrestling Organization, Showtime All-Star Wrestling and New Era Pro Wrestling, as well as many promotions throughout Indiana. In November 2012, he returned to Ohio Valley Wrestling as a masked man attacking his old rival Trailer Park Trash. On December 5, he was unmasked, revealing that he was working for Josette Bynum to "take out the Trash from OVW".

On August 3, 2013, Flanagan won the OVW Television title and became a Triple Crown winner. However, he lost the title to Elijah Burke on September 11, 2013. In March 2015, during the main event at Hoosier Pro Wrestling, Scarecrow Eddie Felson and Wicked Clown jumped Flash. Then Flash demanded a title match against Double R Rob Ramer (the heavyweight champion), Scarecrow Eddie Felson and Wicked Clown (the HPW tag team champions) vs. him and The Van Zants for the April show.

== Championships and accomplishments ==
- Hoosier Pro Wrestling
  - HPW Heavyweight Championship (3 times)
  - HPW Tri-State Championship (1 time)
  - Hall of Fame (Class of 2014)
- IWA Puerto Rico
  - IWA World Heavyweight Championship (1 time)
  - IWA Intercontinental Championship (1 time)
  - IWA World Tag Team Championship (4 times) – with Miguel Perez (1) and Chicano (3)
  - IWA Hardcore Championship (6 times)
- Music City Wrestling
  - MCW North American Tag Team Championships (1 time) – with Wolfie D
- National Wrestling Alliance
  - NWA North American Tag Team Championship (1 time) – with Wolfie D
- High Voltage Wrestling
  - PWA Heavyweight Championship (1 time)
- New Era Wrestling
  - NEW Heavyweight Championship (1 time)
- NWA Midwest
  - NWA Indiana Heritage Championship (1 time)
  - NWA Indiana Heritage Title Tournament (2009)
- Ohio Valley Wrestling
  - OVW Heavyweight Championship (4 times)
  - OVW Hardcore Championship (1 time)
  - OVW Television Championship (1 time)
  - OVW Southern Tag Team Championship (5 times) – with BJ Payne (1), Doug Basham (1), Nick Dinsmore (1) and Trailer Park Trash (2)
  - Twelfth OVW Triple Crown Champion
- Pennsylvania Championship Wrestling
  - PCW Americas Heavyweight Championship (1 time)
  - PCW Tag Team Championship (1 time) – with Glen Osbourne
- Pro Wrestling Illustrated
  - PWI ranked him # 122 of the top 500 singles wrestlers in the PWI 500 in 1999
- Southern Illinois Championship Wrestling
  - SICW Classic / All-Classic Championship (5 times)
  - SICW Tag Team Championship (1 time) – with Jayson Breed
  - SICW All Classic Title Tournament (2021)
- United States Wrestling Association
  - USWA World Tag Team Championship (6 times) – with Billy Travis (2), Steven Dunn (3), Doug Gilbert (1) and Nick Dinsmore (1)
- XCW Midwest Championship Wrestling
  - XCW Midwest Heavyweight Championship (1 time)
- WrestleArts
  - WrestleArts Global Openweight Championship (1 time)
