= Jack Meléndez =

Puerto Rican wrestling announcer

Héctor Meléndez, born in Ponce, Puerto Rico better known by his stage name "Moody" Jack Meléndez or simply Moody, is a Puerto Rican professional wrestling sportscaster. He is known in the United States as the Spanish play-by-play announcer for Total Nonstop Action Wrestling (TNA) and the personal ring announcer for The Latin American Xchange, a stable in TNA. He has also worded for wrestling promotions in Puerto Rico. Melendez is bilingual, speaking both Spanish and English.

== Early life ==
Early in his childhood Meléndez enjoyed wrestling, and his mother used to take him to the World Wrestling Council shows every Saturday. During this time, he became interested in Capitol Sports Promotions until Bruiser Brody was allegedly killed by José Huertas Gonzalez at an event. After this event Meléndez became interested in the programming of the World Wrestling Federation and World Championship Wrestling. He continued watching Capitol's programming but his interest in local wrestling was not revived until the debut of the International Wrestling Association (IWA).

== Career ==
=== IWA Puerto Rico ===
While working for a magazine publisher in Puerto Rico's metropolitan area, Meléndez pursued a job with the IWA.

=== Total Nonstop Action Wrestling ===
Meléndez left Puerto Rico in 2004 and joined TNA, then based in Nashville, Tennessee, as a sportscaster and video editor and producer thanks to Dutch Mantel and Jeff Jarrett. He was originally partnered with Armando Quintero before Konnan began providing commentary, replacing Quintero. This would prove bad for Meléndez since allegedly he felt that Konnan was preventing him from doing his job as an announcer because of Konnan's disrespect for the position and lack of interest in doing a good job. In December 2005, Konnan formed a stable known as the Latin American Xchange (LAX), claiming that Latinos were discriminated against in TNA. The LAX had their own entrance with Moody making the introduction in Spanish becoming the voice of the LAX. In mid-2006, the LAX set up a "border zone" around the Spanish commentary table, attacking any wrestlers who crossed the "border". From TNA Victory Road 2006 Moody also interfered in matches on their behalf, helping them to defeat their opponents several times. In October 2006, Melendez quit Total Nonstop Action Wrestling because he felt that the pay raise he was offered was not sufficient to make up for his increased duties. It was rumored that he had a fallout with Jarrett for unknown reasons. It is also rumored that Melendez wanted to be more involved in the creating process and had already accepted a position as head booker for IWA, but Melendez issued a statement where he said that accepting that position was only " a fact after the matter just because I wasn't a yes man. "

=== World Wrestling Council ===
He then returned to Puerto Rico to work there full-time as the IWA head booker alongside Luke Williams. On the January 18, 2007 edition of TNA Impact! Meléndez returned to television in his previous role and also as the new manager of the LAX. Once again, he was occasionally involved in the outcome of LAX matches. This second stint didn't last long as Meléndez decided to take a breakfrom wrestling. This lasted around four months when shockingly Moody accepted a position as the head booker for the rival WWC in Puerto Rico. Meléndez then began working in the World Wrestling Council, where he worked not only as the booker, but also head of TV, and commentator.

=== Asistencia Asesoría y Administración ===
Since 2004, Melendez had been contacted by the president of AAA (Mexico), the late Antonio Peña. Peña wanted to revolutionize wrestling in México and he believed Melendez was the man that could help him do it offering him the job as booker alongside him. Moody declined this offer several times but with the latest developments in WWC he felt that it was time to go. Melendez quit WWC. After that he had a brief run on IWA Puerto Rico and then took a three-month break and accepted the booking position with AAA Mexico where he resides working as a creative consultant to the Peña family, agent, TV producer and video editor. In 2011 he returned to Puerto Rico. He has since been replaced by Miguel G. Fonseca.

=== World Wrestling League ===
After mediating a collaboration between WWL and The Crash though Konnan, a talent exchange took place beginning at Golpe de Estado 2017. Following the WWL's summer season, Meléndez -who had an offer to book for The Crash- left WWL amidst internal differences with the owner of the promotion's ring and his tag team partner, returning shortly afterwards after the latter left for WWC. However, after hurricanes Irma and Maria passed over Puerto Rico during the 2017 Atlantic hurricane season, Meléndez lost power for several months and WWL came to a halt and entered a hiatus. During this period of inactivity, Konnan also left The Crash for Aro Lucha, formally ending the talent exchange (though Konnan later expressed interest in returning individually). As the return of WWL approached during early 2018, Meléndez resumed his work as booker, appearing in several videos where he approached figures like Mr. Big (Miguel Maldonado) and Dennis Rivera in an effort to create a faction that would oppose the heels led by Manny Ferno.

=== AAA/WWE ===
Jack Melendez aka Moody Jack was hired set to be part of WWE x AAA Worlds Collide on June 7, 2025. This is Melendez second return to AAA and his first creative job for World Wrestling Entertainment (WWE).
