= IWA Intercontinental Championship =

Professional wrestling championship

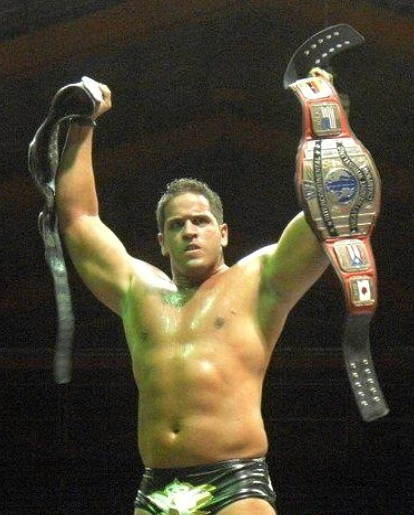
- The IWA Intercontinental Championship (right) being held by former champion Chris Angel.

Details
- Promotion: International Wrestling Association & International Wrestling Entertainment
- Date established: February 23, 2002
- Current champion: Pedro Portillo iii
- Date won: 10/17/26

Other names
- IWA Intercontinental (Heavyweight) Championship (Febrery 23, 2002 - June 16, 2012, September 7, 2019 -present); IWE Intercontinental Championship (January 22, 2022 - November 19, 2022 (Unification)) (During the IWE takeover storyline vs IWA, 2 champions of each division were disputed, it continued with the same lineage); IWA Undisputed Intercontinental Championship (also used in addition as referenced in IWA's website since the November 19, 2022 IWA/IWE title Unification)
Statistics
- First champion: Super Crazy
- Most reigns: Chicano (6 reigns)
- Longest reign: Manny Ferno (623 days)
- Shortest reign: Huracan Castillo (<1 day)

The IWA Intercontinental Championship is a secondary professional wrestling title defended in Puerto Rico. It was originally defended in the original International Wrestling Association, later being reintroduced in the World Wrestling League (WWL). The title was used since 2002, when Super Crazy became the first champion, defeating Eddie Guerrero at the very first Ring of Honor event, The Era of Honor Begins, in Philadelphia, Pennsylvania. The championship was modified in 2009, changing the original black belt to another colored red.

In 2021, Fernando Tonos and Manny Ferno created the group La Alianza IWE with the intention of completing a hostile takeover on behalf of International Wrestling Entertainment. Members of the stable won all of the IWA-PR titles. In response, general manager Chicky Starr and Savio Vega introduced parallel titles for each division in March 2022. While the storyline continued, there was a pair of belts contested independently of each other, with the original being referenced to as the "IWE Intercontinental Championship".

== History ==
In early 2015, while Vega was part of La Radio PR's "Más Allá del Ring" show, the title made appearances as part of the studio's decore along the Undisputed World Heavyweight and World Tag Team Championships.

Reintroduced by Savio Vega as part of the main angle of Golpe de Estado 2018, in which he led a group that intended to convert the WWL into the second incarnation of the IWA. At the event, Richard Rondón carried the title with him. Despite IWA failing at Golpe de Estado, the angle was continued. In the meantime, the Intercontinental Championship was featured in an event sponsored by the municipal administration of Naranjito, still lacking formal adjudication.

=== Reintroduction (2019) ===
On June 15, 2019, in Naranjito, Puerto Rico IWA started doing matches to determine a new Intercontinental Champion. the new champion will be determined at Golpe de Estado in Guaynabo, Puerto Rico on September 7, 2019. On August 24 edition of Impacto Total, Chicky Starr announced that Monster Pain would replace Sweet Nasty Papi due he was beaten and unable to participate at the event.

== Tournament ==
Impacto Total

06/15 Naranjito

Zona de Conflicto

08/17 Vega Alta

Golpe de Estado

09/07 Guaynabo

1
Huracan Castillo
W

8
Pupe Jackson

Thunder
W

Huracan Castillo

4
Thunder
W

5
PMS Dean Rose

Huracan Castillo

Monster Pain

2
Sweet Nasty Papi
W

7
Excellent Mantell

Lightning
W

Sweet Nasty Papi

3
Lightning
W

6
Bolo The Red Bulldog

== Belt designs ==
The original was crafted by Reggie Parks using acid etching in 2002, it used the same basic template that this craftsman has used in the 1986 WWE Intercontinental Championship belt and other titles in his line. Like those belts, the IWA Intercontinental Heavyweight Championship had a main plate composed by three gilded rectangles of receding size, which due to usage exposed the silver coloring underneath. The central area of the design features a geographical World Map inside a circle, flanked by the same design of six five-pointed stars grouped together. Above and under are three black-colored ribbons, with the upper one prominently reading “INTERCONTINENTAL” and the inferior pair “HEAVYWEIGHT WRESTLING CHAMPION”. The lower part features two eight-pointed stars, an element that is also present in the Parks belts. The crown of the belt has the acronym, “IWA”, inside a trapezoid that is surrounded by leaf motifs. There are four two side square side plates which originally featured designs of wrestlers grappling under the company name. These were replaced with ones that depict the flags of Puerto Rico, Japan, Germany and the United States with their capitalized names over each. The title was modified in 2009, when strap was replaced with a new made of red-colored leather. The template was shared with the IWA Hardcore Championship and later the IWA Puerto Rico/Caribbean Heavyweight Championship.

In 2021, IWA-PR commissioned new belts to commemorate its 20th anniversary from Collection Spot. The Intercontinental Heavyweight Championship was replaced with an original design, which was based on the original. The new belt featured an oblong central plaque that preserved the World Map and ribbons. However, it introduced two flanking black ribbons which contained five stars and widespread use of heraldic wreath motifs and mantling. The grouping of six stars forming another star, a feature created by Parks and present in many of his designs, was used inside a circle placed at the bottom of the central plaque. The side plates were redesigned to be circular and removing the flags. Both feature maps surrounded by two ribbons with five stars and wreaths, with the left plaque depicting the Western Hemisphere and the right the Eastern Hemisphere. All three plates include a silver-colored IWA logo at the top. Meanwhile, the original belt was repurposed as the IWE Intercontinental Championship with a sticker of the stable's logo being placed over the "IWA" in the crown of the center plate.

== Title history ==
Indicates disputed IWA/IWE champions.
Indicates title reigns and changes not recognized by IWA or vacancies.

Highlights in bold denotes after Juicio Final 2022 each division have 2 champions due by the controversy between IWA and IWE, in which the latter took control of the old titles forcing IWA to create new titles in each division

#	Wrestlers	Reign	Date	Days held	Location	Event	Notes	Ref
1	Super Crazy	1	February 23, 2002	42	Philadelphia, Pennsylvania	ROH : The Era of Honor Begins	Defeated Eddie Guerrero at Ring of Honor's debut show to become the first champion.	
2	"El Lobo" Andy Anderson	1	April 6, 2002	7	Carolina, Puerto Rico	Juicio Final II	Defeated Super Crazy in a Tables, Ladders and Chairs Match.	
3	Super Crazy	2	April 13, 2002	7	Bayamón, Puerto Rico		Won the title by forfeit due to Lobo being injured.	
4	Anarchy	1	April 20, 2002	28	Bayamón, Puerto Rico			
5	Chicano	1	May 18, 2002	98	Caguas, Puerto Rico	IWA TV Taping		
6	"El Lobo" Andy Anderson	2	August 24, 2002	42	Toa Baja, Puerto Rico	IWA TV Taping		
	Vacant		October 5, 2002	Bayamón, Puerto Rico	IWA TV Taping	Miguel Pérez stripped El Lobo of the title due to an injury.		
7	Justin Sane	1	October 5, 2002	28	Bayamón, Puerto Rico	IWA TV Taping	Defeated Diabólico.	
8	Eric Alexander	1	November 2, 2002	42	Bayamón, Puerto Rico	IWA TV Taping		
9	Abyss	1	December 14, 2002	1	Carolina, Puerto Rico	Christmas in PR (2002)		
10	Glamour Boy Shane	1	December 15, 2002	83	San Germán, Puerto Rico	Christmas in PR (2002)		
11	Nord	1	March 8, 2003	42	Toa Baja, Puerto Rico	IWA TV Taping		
12	Chicano	2	April 19, 2003	98	Bayamón, Puerto Rico	IWA TV Taping		
13	Ricky Banderas	1	July 26, 2003	125	Bayamón, Puerto Rico	IWA TV Taping	Also Defeated Vampiro to win his 5th reign for the IWA Hardcore Championship on July 12, 2003 in San Juan, Puerto Rico and Banderas Defeated Vampiro again to win his 6th for the IWA Hardcore Championship on October 7, 2003 in Kissimmee, Florida.	
	Vacant		November 28, 2003	Manatí, Puerto Rico	Hardcore Weekend (2002)	Ray Gonzalez requested a match with David Flair for the belt.		
14	David Flair	1	November 28, 2003	2	Manatí, Puerto Rico	Hardcore Weekend (2002)	Defeated Ray Gonzalez for the vacant championship.	
15	Ray González	1	November 30, 2003	27	Mayagüez, Puerto Rico			
16	Invader I	1	December 27, 2003	119	Carolina, Puerto Rico			
17	Glamour Boy Shane	2	April 24, 2004	210	Cayey, Puerto Rico	IWA TV Taping		
18	Bison	1	November 20, 2004	84	Bayamón, Puerto Rico	Hardcore Weekend (2004)		
19	Slash Venom	1	February 12, 2005	13	Caguas, Puerto Rico	IWA TV Taping	This was a Steel Cage match.	
20	Kasey James	1	February 25, 2005	30	Gurabo, Puerto Rico			
21	Ricky Banderas	2	March 27, 2005	20	Guayanilla, Puerto Rico	IWA TV Taping		
22	Jean-Pierre Lafitte	1	April 16, 2005	63	Caguas, Puerto Rico			
23	Ricky Banderas	3	June 18, 2005	103	Carolina, Puerto Rico		Won the title in a Steel Cage match.	
24	Hannibal	1	September 29, 2005	10	Gurabo, Puerto Rico			
25	Noriega	1	October 9, 2005	27	Toa Baja, Puerto Rico			
26	Invader I	2	November 5, 2005	84	Bayamon, Puerto Rico			
26	Chicano	3	January 28, 2006	42	Levittown, Puerto Rico			
27	Ray González	2	March 11, 2006	99	Bayamón, Puerto Rico			
	Vacant		June 18, 2006	Yabucoa, Puerto Rico		Title stripped.		
28	Magnificent Chris	1	July 15, 2006	91	Toa Baja, Puerto Rico		Won a battle royal, last eliminating Joe Bravo.	
29	Chicano	4	October 14, 2006	83	Caguas, Puerto Rico	Hardcore Weekend (2006)	If Magnificent Chris loses, he will have to dress like a woman.	
30	Mr. Big	1	January 5, 2007	15	Isabela, Puerto Rico	Histeria Boricua (2007)		
31	Lightning	1	January 20, 2007	85	Levittown, Puerto Rico	IWA TV Taping		
32	El Diamante (Julio César Cruz)	1	April 15, 2007	34	Isabela, Puerto Rico			
33	"Jumpin" Jeff Jeffrey	1	May 19, 2007	40	Carolina, Puerto Rico	Juicio Final - La Revancha	Won the title pinning the champion in a tag team match	
	Vacant		July 28, 2007	Carolina, Puerto Rico		Jeff Jeffrey jumped to WWC so the title was stripped from him.		
34	Vito	1	August 18, 2007	45	Bayamón, Puerto Rico	Armagedón (2007)	Defeated El Bacano.	
	Vacant		October 2, 2007	Yabucoa, Puerto Rico		Title vacant.		
35	Richard Rondón	1	January 6, 2008	Bayamón, Puerto Rico	69	Histeria Boricua (2008)	Won a battle royal.	
36	Romeo	1	March 15, 2008	63	Caguas, Puerto Rico	IWApr.tv Exclusive	The event was branded exclusive for IWApr.tv website.	
37	Richard Rondón	2	May 17, 2008	56	Bayamón, Puerto Rico	Juicio Final VIII		
	Vacant		July 12, 2008	Bayamón, Puerto Rico		Title vacant.		
38	Romeo	2	July 19, 2008	8	Bayamón, Puerto Rico	Summer Attitude (2008)	Defeated Mr. Big.	
39	Mr.Big	2	July 27, 2008	27	Levittown, Puerto Rico	Summer Attitude - La Revancha		
40	Richard Rondón	3	August 23, 2008	42	Levittown, Puerto Rico	Road to Armaggedon	Before the match Romeo attacks brutally Mr. Big, later in the same night Richard Rondón returns and Defeated Romeo to become the new IWA Intercontinental Heavyweight Champion.	
41	Joe Bravo	1	October 4, 2008	133	Isabela, Puerto Rico	Golpe de Estado (2008)		
42	Super Crazy	3	February 14, 2009	93	Bayamón, Puerto Rico	Noche de Campeones (2009)		
43	Rick Stanley	1	May 16, 2009	63	Bayamón, Puerto Rico	Juicio Final (2009)		
44	Diabólico	1	July 18, 2009	84	Bayamón, Puerto Rico	IWA 10th Anniversary	Defeated Rick Stanley in a Ladder Match.	
45	Joe Bravo	2	October 10, 2009	18	Bayamón, Puerto Rico	IWA TV Taping	Also Defeated Miguel Pérez, Jr. for the IWA World Heavyweight Championship to become double champion.	
46	Dennis Rivera	1	October 28, 2009	80	Sabana Grande, Puerto Rico			
47	Joe Bravo	3	January 16, 2010	91	Aguas Buenas, Puerto Rico	IWA TV Taping		
48	Noel Rodríguez	1	April 17, 2010	70	Bayamón, Puerto Rico	Juicio Final (2010)		
49	Gilbert	1	June 26, 2010	21	Bayamón, Puerto Rico	V Copa José Miguel Pérez		
50	Noel Rodríguez	2	July 17, 2010	21	Bayamón, Puerto Rico	Summer Attitude (2010)	Defeated Gilbert in a TLC match.	
51	Diabólico	2	August 7, 2010	120	Toa Alta, Puerto Rico	Back to School	Defeated Ash Rubinsky and Noel Rodríguez in 3-way match.	
52	Chris Angel	1	December 5, 2010	327	Bayamón, Puerto Rico	Christmas in P.R (2010)	After Diabólico no showed the match, Chris Angel Defeated Savio Vega in his in-ring debut to win the vacant title.	
53	El Ilegal (Jeff Jeffrey)	2	October 28, 2011	106	Toa Alta, Puerto Rico	Halloween Mayhem (2011)		
54	Zcion	1	February 11, 2012	126	Toa Alta, Puerto Rico	Kaos and Odissey	Defeated El Ilegal, Jay-Cobs and Enigma in a 4-way match.	
	Deactivated		June 16, 2012			When IWA closed		
55	Huracan Castillo	1	September 7, 2019	<1day	Guaynabo, Puerto Rico	Golpe de Estado (2019)	The President of IWA, Savio Vega named Huracan Castillo as the Tournament Champion by default and the New IWA Intercontinental Champion.	
56	Monster Pain	1	September 7, 2019	84	Guaynabo, Puerto Rico	Golpe de Estado (2019)		
57	Electro	1	November 30, 2019	98	Trujillo Alto, Puerto Rico	Hardcore Weekend (2019)		
58	Manny Ferno	1	March 7, 2020	623	Humacao, Puerto Rico	Histeria Boricua (2020)		
59	Chicano	5	November 20, 2021	1	Manati, Puerto Rico	Impacto Total		
60	Mighty Ursus	1	November 21, 2021	20	Manati, Puerto Rico	Impacto Total		
61	Chicano	6	December 11, 2021	70	Humacao, Puerto Rico	Christmas in P.R (2021)	During his reign on January 22, 2022, Chicano was viciously attacked by Mighty Ursus, with the latter stealing his title and unofficially self-proclaimed himself as Champion, with him calling referring it as the IWE Intercontinental Championship or just as Intercontinental Championship as Tonos and the alliance takeover control of titles	
62	Khriz Díaz (IWE Half)	1	February 19, 2022	70	Manati, Puerto Rico	Impacto Total	After legitimate champion Chicano was viciously injured and was not available to defend for 3 months, in a meeting between Vega, Tonos, Ferno and Promoter Edwin Ortega. 4th contender Díaz was awarded the title by Manny Ferno who was the number 1 contender after he withdrew from a signed match at the meeting between him and Díaz (Grimm and Ursus (unofficial self-proclaimed champion) were second and third contenders respectively and were out with injuries.	
63	Niche (IWA Half)	1	April 30, 2022	49	Humacao, Puerto Rico	Juicio Final (2022)	IWA crowned a new IWA Intercontinental Champion in a X Match also involved Ezdraz, El Hijo Del Enigma, Dean Rose & Azazel	
64	Electro (IWE Half)	2	April 30, 2022	28	Humacao, Puerto Rico	Juicio Final (2022)		
65	Khriz Diaz (IWE Half)	2	May 28, 2022	21	Vega Baja, Puerto Rico	La Gran Amenaza (2022)	Defeated Electro in a rematch to win the IWE Intercontinental Championship, in other side Niche retains the IWA Intercontinental Championship	
66	Aiden Grimm (IWE Half)	1	June 18, 2022	42	Humacao, Puerto Rico	Summer Attitude (2022)	Defeated Khris Diaz to win the IWE Intercontinental belt.	
67	Azazel (IWA Half)	1	June 18, 2022	12	Humacao, Puerto Rico	Summer Attitude (2022)	Defeated El Niche to win the IWA Intercontinental belt.	
68	Niche (IWA Half)	2	July 30, 2022	142	Guaynabo, Puerto Rico	Summer Attitude (2022)	Defeated Azazel to win the IWA Intercontinental belt.	
69	Manú (IWE half/Unification)	1 IWE half / 2 Undisputed	July 30, 2022	189	Guaynabo, Puerto Rico	Summer Attitude (2022)	Defeated Aiden Grimm to win the IWE half, months later during his reign he defeated Niche on November 19 to win the IWA half, unifying the belts and became the Undisputed IWA Intercontinental champion. Ending the IWA/IWE title dispute storyline	
68	Azazel	2	February 4, 2023	21	Humacao, Puerto Rico	Vendetta (2023)		
69	Manú	3	February 25, 2023	266	Unknown River location	Impacto Total	This was a segment-match, defeated Azazel to win the IWA title in a last man standing match that started in the parking lot of Coliseo Emilio Huyke and ended in an unknown river, where the former champion drowned and did not respond.	
70	John Hawking	1	December 16, 2023	658	Juncos, Puerto Rico	Mano Dura	During this reign, on the September 28 Golpe de Estado event, Hawking defeat Pedro Portillo III in a triple title match for the IWA World Heavyweight Championship, Heavyweight Championship, the IWA Puerto Rico Championship and retained his IWA Intercontinental Championship.	
	Vacant			September 6, 2025	—	—	Due to an agreement with IWA Commissioner Fernando Tonos.	
71	El Cuervo	1	September 27, 2025	21	Humacao, Puerto Rico	Golpe de Estado	He defeated Manu in the final for the vacant title.	
	Vacant		October 18, 2025		Humacao, Puerto Rico	Halloween Mayhem	Due to an injury.	
72	Manu	4	October 18, 2025	126	Humacao, Puerto Rico	Halloween Mayhem	He defeated Paradox for the vacant title.	
—	Vacant		February 21, 2026		Vega Alta, Puerto Rico	Vendetta	Due to an rise how world champion.	
73	Luis Jabtiel Pérez	1	Abril 25, 2026	0	San Juan, Puerto Rico	Daño Colateral	He defeated Pedro Portillo III for the vacant title.	
74	Pedro Portillo iii	1	Abril 25, 2026	105	San Juan, Puerto Rico	Daño Colateral		
75	Mr. Iguana	1	August 8, 2026	70	Humacao, Puerto Rico	Summer Attitude		
—	Vacant		October 17, 2026		Humacao, Puerto Rico	Golpe de Estado	Due to the physical absence of Mr. Iguana	
76	Pedro Portillo iii	2	October 17, 2026	13+	Humacao, Puerto Rico	Golpe de Estado	He defeated Barbie Boy for the vacant title due to the physical absence of Mr. Iguana	

== Combined reigns ==
As of October 30, 2026.

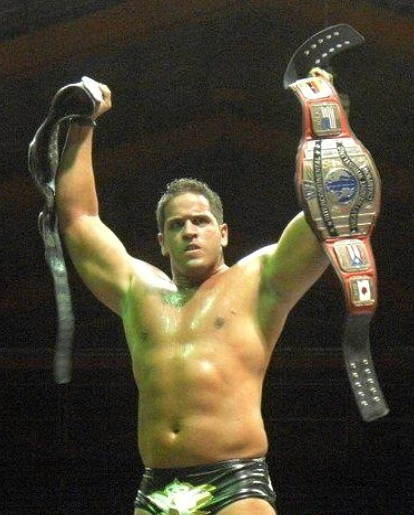
Record longest reigning champion Chris Angel

†	Indicates the current champion

Rank	Wrestler	No. of reigns	Combined days
1	Manny Ferno	1	623
2	John Hawking	1	1077+
3	Chicano	6	507
4	Chris Angel	1	326
5	Glamour Boy Shane	2	293
6	Joe Bravo	3	280
7	Ricky Banderas	3	248
8	Ray Gonzalez	2	244
9	Invader I	2	202
10	Diabólico	2	198
11	Richard Rondón	3	167
12	Super Crazy	3	140
13	Zcion	1	126
14	Electro	1	98
15	Noel Rodríguez	2	91
15	Magnificent Chris	1	91
17	Lightning	1	87
18	Bison Smith	1	84
19	Monster Pain	1	80
20	Romeo	2	71
21	Khriz Díaz	1	70
22	Jeff Jeffrey	1	67
23	Jean Pierre Lafitte	1	63
23	Rick Stanley	1	63
25	Dennis Rivera	1	49
26	E2 Lobo (Andy Anderson)	2	48
27	Big Vito	1	45
28	Nord	1	42
28	Eric Alexander	1	42
30	Mr. Big	2	35
31	Diamante	1	32
32	Kasey James	30	
33	Anarchy	28	
34	Justin Sane	27	
35	Noriega	27	
36	Gilbert	21	
37	Mighty Ursus	20	
38	Slash Venom	13	
39	Hannibal	10	
40	David Flair	1	
41	Abyss	1	
42	Huracan Castillo	1	<1
