= Tommy Diablo =

Puerto Rican professional wrestler

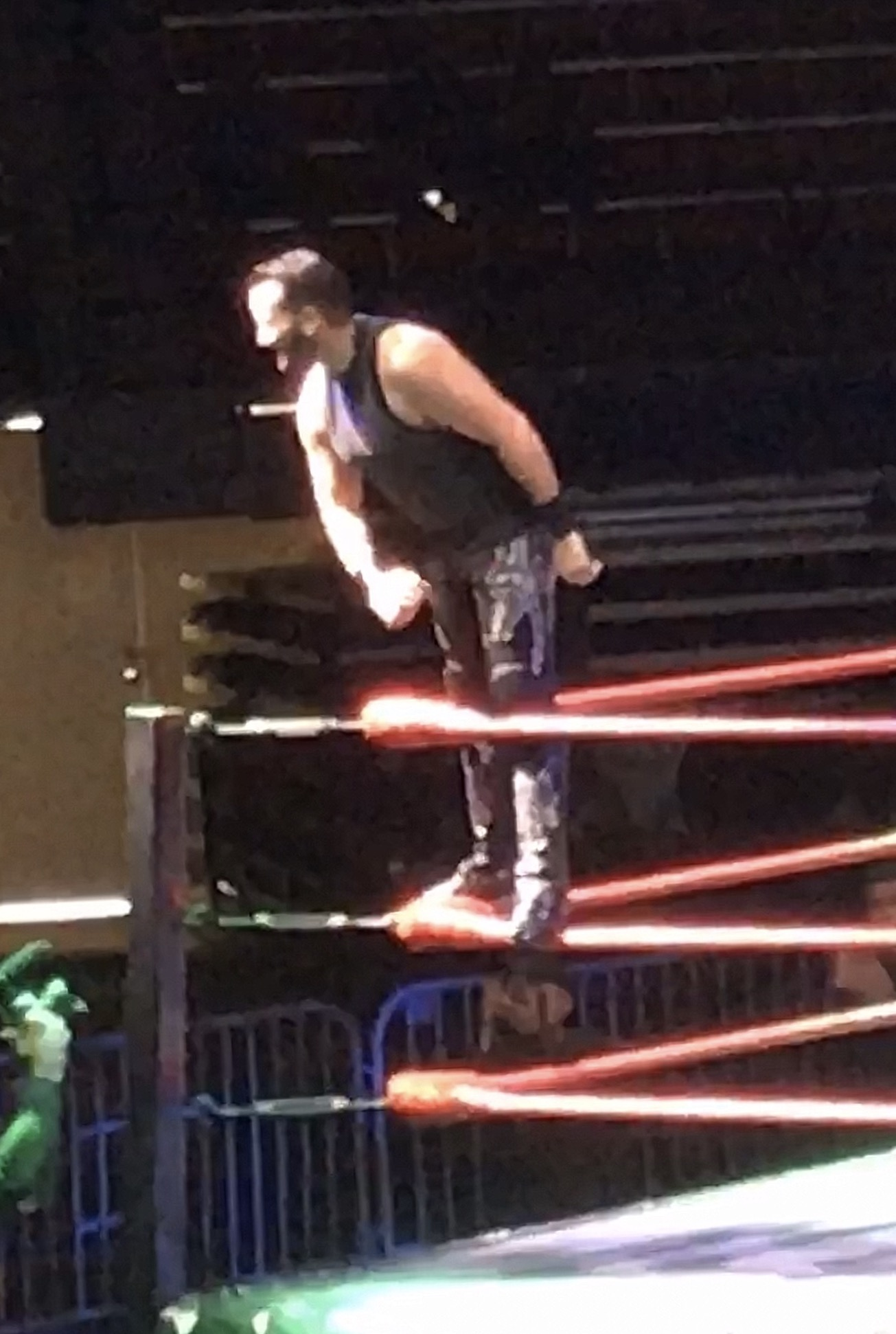

Personal information
- Born: Armando José Gorbea Pontón Carolina, Puerto Rico

Professional wrestling career
- Ring name(s): Tommy Diablo; Mr. San Juan Tommy Diablo
- Billed height: 5 ft 8 in (1.73 m)
- Billed weight: 200 lb (91 kg)
- Trained by: Isaac Rosario
- Debut: 2000

Armando Gorbea Pontón, better known as Tommy Diablo, is a professional wrestler better known for wrestling in both the International Wrestling Association in Puerto Rico and the World Wrestling Council, where he is a fifteen-time WWC World Junior Heavyweight Champion.

== Professional career ==
=== Early career ===
Gorbea was raised in the tourist district of Isla Verde, Puerto Rico, where several of the foreign wrestlers that worked for Capitol Sports Promotions (now the World Wrestling Council or simply WWC) and International Wrestling Association (IWA-PR) stayed. He would follow his neighbors around, chatting with them and asking where he could train to become a wrestler himself. Among them was Shane Sewell, with whom Gorbea struck a friendship and who referred him to Isaac Rosario's school in the municipality of Vega Alta. There he trained along The Colóns, Thunder and Lightning and Lucha Libre 101, whose members were starting to wrestle at IWA-PR and WWC and where veterans such as Ray González made training appearances.

While attending an IWA-PR card as a fan, Gorbea met founder Víctor Quiñones, who gave him backstage work assembling the ring, setting up the cameras and selling tickets. He continued training with Rosario, who intended to debut him in an independent show. Instead, Gorbea was contacted by Savio Vega (Juan Rivera), who recruited him to work in IWA-PR. He adopted the ring name “Tommy Diablo” prior to his debut, intending it to be concise and memorable. In 2000 Tommy Diablo made his professional debut in the International Wrestling Association of Puerto Rico. His first notable feud was against Andy Anderson and Tiger Ali Singh, during this angle he teamed up with Steve Bradley. The feud was part of Club WWF a weekly television program transmitted on Telemundo. He won his first title within four months, becoming the Junior Heavyweight Champion.

In June 2001, Stefano and Paparazzy defeated Anarchy and Tommy Diablo. During the summer of 2001, Gorbea was involved in a feud against Paparazzi and his assistant in El Tocotón Stefano. As part of this storyline he teamed with Anarchy to win a tag team match, but was subsequently humiliated by getting his lips painted. This tag team went on to defeat Lucha Libre 101 members Carlos Cotto and Sinigaglia. Gorbea and Anarchy then defeated Paparazzy and Stefano, but were covered in syrup by both the Tocotón crew and Lucha Libre 101. The following week, the team won a rematch where the loser would get tarred and covered in feathers. At Summer Attitude 2001, Gorbea won a battle royale. On August 4, 2001, Gorbea won the IWA Hardcore Championship by randomly intervening in a match due to the 24/7 rule, dropping it back immediately. Gorbea and García then had differences while working a tag team match.

A lingering knee injury forced Gorbea to take a break from the ring, missing the first edition of Juicio Final. After recovering, Diablo left the IWA and debuted on the World Wrestling Council during 2002. He was involved in a feud against Eddie Colón over the WWC Junior Heavyweight championship. He would fail to acquire the title for Colon. When Colon was defeated in a title match against Kid Kash, Diablo would develop a feud for the title. He won the WWC Junior Heavyweight championship on December 14, 2002. He won the title against Brent Dáil in a match to determine a new champion after the title was vacated by Kash. He teamed with Wilfredo Alejandro in an angle where he would attempt to unmask a wrestler that was playing mind games with him. Tommy Diablo was part of La Invasion Dominicana a heel faction led by El Bronco and Chicky Starr. Diablo would make a return to the International Wrestling Association in 2003. After losing to Noriega during the first night of Juicio Final 2003, Tocotón Team joined him in an attack over the former, until Anarchy and Chris Devine made the save. The following night, Gorbea defeated Anarchy and once again joined Stefano and Paparazzi in another attack. This feud continued throughout April, with the addition of other wrestlers in the matches between teams. Gorbea then formed an alliance with Freddy Lozada, which lost to Andy Anderson and Chris Devine. On May 4, 2003, Gorbea injured his arm in a match against Noriega. When Team Tocotón began having issues, Gorbea replaced García at El Tocotón and in exchange, Tapia helped him defeat Noriega to win the Junior Heavyweight Championship. In May 2003, Rivera and Eddie Colón encountered each other in a restaurant, entering into an argument about the practices and product of their respective promotions. The IWA turned this into an angle, where they belittled Colón as a “fan of Tommy Diablo” during a segment of El Tocotón. Noriega was able to respond by defeating him in a rematch.

=== Hosting El Tocotón ===
On May 30, 2003, García formally quit El Tocotón, being replaced by Gorbea full time. However, both would later be involved in an angle where the new host of the segment would be selected by popular vote, where Gorbea aided Paparazzi in his bid to retain the segment. Meanwhile, Gorbea and Tapia formed a tag team, defeating Anarchy and Damián. He was then placed in a makeshift tag team with García, taking the pin and leading to a confrontation involving his title. In July 2003, Gorbea traveled to Mexico in order to join the Consejo Mundial de Lucha Libre, where he performed throughout the following month. On August 2, 2003, Gorbea returned to the IWA and dropped the Junior Heavyweight Championship to Anarchy. Gorbea tried unsuccessfully to regain the championship twice. During this timeframe he also Noriega, but lost to García in the continuation of the Tocotón angle. On August 30, 2003, Gorbea regained the Junior Heavyweight Championship in another rematch. Despite this, he continued losing to the former champion. At Golpe de Estado 2003, Gorbea lost to García, leading to a confrontation with referee José Vázquez, against whom he exchanged wins the other nights of the event. The feud continued and Gorbea formed an alliance with another referee, who would rig the results in his favor. His ongoing alliance with Tapia continued being unsuccessful. On October 4, 2003, he defeated Freddie Lozada. Both would be involved in an ongoing rivalry during the rest of the month. After falling behind in a series against him 1–2, Lozada earned another win to tie the score. On October 7, 2003, Gorbea retained the Junior Heavyweight Champion in the promotion's first card in the city of Kissimmee, Florida. Lozada continued being a frequent challenger for Gorbea's title, who managed to retain it throughout October. Afterwards, García continued his winning streak over Gorbea. On November 1, 2003, Lozada won a four-way match to become the first contender and later in the night defeated Gorbea for the title. The former champion unsuccessfully attempted to sabotage Lozada, who also continued his winning streak over him. However, Gorbea was able to win a three-way where the champion also wrestled in return. Both were then involved in a brief interlude, where they defeated jobbers. During one of the preliminary nights of Hardcore Weekend, Gorbea defeated Chris Sabin. The main night of the tour, Lozada won a three-way match for the Junior Heavyweight Championship against Gorbea and Chris Sabin. He was involved in an angle in which he helped Paparazzi in a feud with Stefano, this angle lasted through fall. The long-running feud between Gorbea and García extended to 2004. His rivalry with Lozada also turned bizarre, with the addition of midget wrestlers. Gorbea entered a series with mixed results against masked wrestler Super Atomo, before making a brief run in the heavyweights, being squashed by Eric Pérez. On February 14, 2004, Gorbea briefly resumed his alliance with Tapia and his feud with García, helping him win the Junior Heavyweight Championship but losing to the second. Shortly afterwards, he was involved in more matches against Super Atomo and was occasionally aided by referee Anarchy. He defeated Lozada with the help of Tapia. On March 13, 2004, Gorbea defeated him to win the Junior Heavyweight Championship. This feud continued afterwards. At IWA Extravaganza, Blitz & Cyrus defeated Tommy Diablo & Just Perfect. In February 2004, Gorbea defeated Lozada. At Juicio Final 2004, he participated in an X-Match for the Junior Heavyweight Championship, but was dethroned by Lozada. When Diablo and other heels expelled a wrestler from their locker-room, Lozada intervened. During the following month, Gorbea stagnated in the low card, facing Golden Boy and winning the occasional title defense. He opened the Summer Attitude with a tag team loss. During the Summer Attitude tour, Lozada retained the Junior Heavyweight Championship by defeating Gorbea in a ladder match.

=== Mr. Japan ===
His stay in IWA-PR allowed him to travel to Japan, where he joined Taka Michinoku's Kaientai Dojo, being accompanied by other young talents. In Puerto Rico, he underwent a character change and adopted the moniker of Mr. Japan, but Lozada continued dominating their feud. On August 14, 2004, Ray González presented Gorbea as the latest member of his stable, La Familia. He was the involved in a feud with Julio Franco over the title. The title was held up after he scored a controversial win over referee Pelayo Vázquez, following the interference of Franco. Vázquez went on to win the title with the help of Franco, and win a rematch. At Golpe de Estado 2004, El Enjabonao defeated Gorbea. In September 2004, Gorbea defeated Pelayo Vázquez and Just Perfect. He was involved in an angle in which he was (kayfabe) gravely injured by Apolo, he was out of action until early 2005. On January 22, 2005, the IWA aired a segment where Lozada implied that Gorbea was a has been, signaling a face turn. On February 12, 2005, they were involved in an angle where the team sabotaged a gift that Carlos Cotto had left for a woman, only for Gorbea to intervene and be attacked instead. On March 6, 2005, it was revealed that Gorbea wanted to join a stable known as La Nueva Generacion, coached by Huertas. On April 18, 2005, Gorbea aided Blitz a match for the Junior Heavyweight Championship, despite being a face. At Juicio Final, he officially turned heel by abandoning his partner. He was involved in a feud with Super Mark eventually defeating him for Junior Heavyweight title on May 21, 2005, in Toa Baja, Puerto Rico. Gorbea helped Stefano defeat Viruz. On May 21, 2005, Gorbea won the Junior Heavyweight championship and turned on his valet. In June, Gorbea was involved in an inter-sex feud with Amazona, who defeated him in singles. At the Víctor Rodríguez memorial Cup, Gorbea retained the title over Amazona. In February 2006, Gorbea's team lost to Hiram Tua's team. During the following weeks, he continued participating in random tag team pairings with little success . On February 19, 2006, Gorbea intervened in a match for the Junior Heavyweight Championship by distracting Díaz to help Lozada and later boasted about helping the champion. At IWA Uncensored Díaz defeated Gorbea. At Juicio Final, he teamed with Díaz to defeat Lozada and Chris. On April 8, 2006, Lozada defeated Gorbea with the help of Chris. On June 10, 2006, he defeated Magnificent Chris. On July 15, 2006, Gorbea defeated Lozada by cheating. He then challenged for the title in a rematch, but won by disqualification. On August 19, 2006, Gorbea won a four corner match and Díaz issued a challenge for Golpe de Estado.

=== WWS and teaming ===
While IWA and WWS held a talent exchange agreement, Gorbea had a parallel feud with Chris at that promotion. He also challenged for the WWS World Heavyweight Championship. Gorbea then defeated Lozada in a grudge match, and prevented his rival from interfering in a match for the Junior Heavyweight Championship. At Golpe de Estado, Gorbea defeated Lozada. At Golpe de Estado, Díaz won a titular X match in which Díaz and Gorbea participated. Later in the tour, Díaz and Gorbea lost a titular three-way match to Super Mark. he rebounded by defeating the champion in a three fall match. On September 9, 2006, Gorbea lost to a debuting Muerte Cibernetica 2 (Richard Rondón). He then lost a non-titular match to Mark.

Gorbea then formed a team with El Diabólico and exchanged wins with the tag team champions, the British Militia (Jon Moxley and Hade Vansen). On September 23, 2006, they failed to capture the titles. The following weeks, Díaz teamed with Gorbea and exchanged wins with the tag team champions. Gorbea and Díaz would later win a 3 on 3 match by double pinning The British Militia. He challenged for the titles along Jeffreys, but lost. The first night of Hardcore Weekend, the team won a match in anticipation to their opportunity. The main night of the event, The British Militia retained the titles. The final night of Hardcore Weekend, Lozada defeated Gorbea in an extreme rules match. He then resumed his team with Diabólico, in a loss to the British Militia. Diablo then lost to Ash. Towards the year's end, Lozada and Big were rebranded as “Los Rabiosos”, a pair of deadbeats that spent their time drinking beer, partying and playing basketball. Under this new persona, Lozada was given a win over Gorbea. He continued performing in the low card. To open Armagedon, Gorbea and Díaz teamed again in a win over La Revolución Dominicana and a debutant. He then defeated the new Junior heavyweight champion, bolo. On November 25, 2006, the IWA dropped the Junior Heavyweight Championship and opened the division to both genders, creating the Cruiserweight Championship. That same date, they hosted a tournament where he participated defeating a valet in the first round. Lozada then defeated Gorbea. He was ten booked in low card tag team matches, and a loss to Moxley. At Christmas in PR, Gorbea defeated Super Mark.

=== Frustration ===
On December 30, 2006, the IWA aired a backstage segment where Gorbea encountered the promotional poster for Histeria Boricua 2007 and left frustrated that he was not in it. At Histeria Boricua, Gorbea's team defeated Lozada's team. On January 6, 2007, Gorbea turned heel in a promo where it criticized the management of the IWA and ordered the public to change their ring side tickets for general entrance tickets since he would not be wrestling. Later that night, he tried to aid Ray González in a match for the World Heavyweight Championship. In the following date of the tour, he participated in a four-way match for the Hardcore Championship. In a subsequent show, he was involved in confrontations with the ring crew over the state of its assembly. Gorbea then joined La Revolución against members of “La Nueva Generacion” including Díaz and Mulero. On January 21, 2007, Gorbea asked for an opportunity for the World Heavyweight Championship, but was ignored. Later in the event, he unsuccessfully challenged Lozada for the Cruiserweight Championship. Díaz then defeated Gorbea, when he focused on grabbing a card protesting against the IWA administration. Afterwards, he confronted the referees. Gorbea continued depressed and dropped a match to Super Mark. On January 27, 2007, Mulero eliminated Gorbea in the final of a Hardcore Elimination Match to win the Hardcore Championship. In segments aired on February 3, 2007, Gorbea tried to recruit Cruz and Super Mark to his cause. On February 3, 2007, Gorbea insulted Amazona after she was beaten, being joined by Cruz, who made a heel turn.

=== Las Estrellas ===
In early 2007, Gorbea turned heel and became part of a stable named “Las Estrellas“ led by general manager Orlando Toledo. Los Aéreos feuded with Orlando Toledo's Las Estrellas, defeating Super Mark and Gorbea. Blitz also defeated Gorbea, now part of Toledo's Estrellas, in secondary cards. On February 25, 2007, Diablo teamed with Killer Kat to defeated Díaz and Amazona. González then ordered Las Estrellas to get rid of Los Aéreos. Los Aéreos then defeated Gorbea and Super Mark, part of Las Estrellas which had been tasked with eliminating them. In secondary cards, Los Rabiosos defeated Gorbea and Rondón. On March 11, 2007, Gorbea retained the Cruiserweight Championship over Díaz. Gorbea then challenged the members of the ring crew led by Noel Rodríguez, but this plan backfired. Gorbea then retained the Extreme Cruiserweight Championship over Díaz. At the Víctor Quiñones Memorial, Gorbea retained the Extreme Cruiserweight Championship over Díaz, Psichosis and Balbuena. Díaz suffered a legitimate injury during this match, but still made an appearance in a loss to Gorbea. Mulero then defeated Gorbea. At Juicio Final, Lozada defeated Gorbea in a non-title match. Later in the tour, he defeated Billy Kidman and Psichosis in a match for the title. On May 19, 2007, Gorbea dropped the Extreme Cruiserweight championship to Phoenix Star. Rivera challenged Gorbea to a match where Orlando Toledo would be forced to wrestle him if the Estrella lost. Rivera won the match and earned the right to wrestle Toledo five minutes at the José Miguel Pérez Cup. Gorbea was one of several IWA talents that participated in Junte para la Historia, a card held on June 14, 2007, in memorial of deceased wrestler Omar Pérez Barreto. At the José Miguel Pérez Cup, Gorbea and Sweet Nancy lost to Amazona and Lozada. The same night, Rivera lost a match due to the intervention of Gorbea. Later in the tour, he lost to Toledo with the help of Gorbea. Gorbea won a match between both. Rivera then won a rematch. Afterwards, both were involved in a challenge that included two referees. In mixed gender matches, Gorbea's team defeated Rivera's. At Summer Attitude, Los Aéreos defeated Gorbea and Bolo. Gorbea then defeated Rivera in another tag team match. Rivera closed Summer Attitude by defeating Gorbea. Díaz then defended the Extreme Cruiserweight Championship over Gorbea. Gorbea then defeated referee José Vazuqez. Gorbea and Rondón then defeated low carders. the team then became known as Club Élite. A segment between both revealed that Rondón was getting tired of being a heel. On September 2, 2007, Cruz and Gorbea turned on Rondón after being ordered to do so by Toledo. Afterwards, he continued losing to midcarders aiding Toledo's team. On November 22, 2007, Gorbea appeared at NWG's Thanksgiving Riot, losing to Abbad. In the same event, his team lost a three on three match. At Christmas in PR, Bolo defeated Gorbea for the Hardcore Championship. Afterwards, Gorbea abandoned a match against Cassandro after being legitimately kissed in a deviation from the script. At Guerra por el Oro, Gorbea lost to a returning Jeffreys. At La Revancha, Los Aéreos defeated Dennis Rivera and Gorbea. Los Aéreos then defeated Stanley and Gorbea to win opportunities for the Extreme Cruiserweight and Tag Team championships. Gorbea continued being harassed by Cassandro. At Injustice, Gorbea lost to a returning Guzmán.

=== Independent circuit, WWC ===
After the IWA experienced an internal administrative rift, Gorbea made appearances for LLXI. On May 8, 2008, it was announced that Gorbea was opening a wrestling school at Tae Fit Gym in Carolina, Puerto Rico. Later that month, it was reported that Gorbea was in conversations with WWC to return. On May 31, 2008, Juventud Rebelde and a returning Gorbea attacked BJ during a match with El Profe. Gorbea then defeated Estrada. Gorbea continued interrupting BJ's matches. BJ then defeated Gorbea. Gorbea was then featured in interviews claiming that BJ had robbed the Puerto Rico Heavyweight Championship. BJ then retained the title against Gorbea. Gorbea then wrestled in tag team action, losing to Gemelos D’ Jour. On August 9, 2008, Gorbea defeated BJ to win the Puerto Rico Heavyweight Championship. Besides his valet, Gorbea was assisted by Aquiles Falcon as enforcer, allowing him to pick wins over Estrada Jr. A match between Noriega and BJ then evolved in a 3 on 3, with the addition of Orlando Colón, Estrada Jr., González and Gorbea, with the faces winning. He hosted an open challenge for any wrestlers that wanted to challenge Falcon. In singles, Gorbea defeated Abbad due to intervention. BJ then defeated Todd Dean despite the intervention of Gorbea. Gorbea then faced Shane Sewell, but got himself counted out. BJ and Gorbea then wrestled to a time limit draw. Castillo then defeated Gorbea, after being jumped by the heels. At Septiembre Negro, BJ and Gorbea wrestled to a time limit draw. BJ won a subsequent rematch by disqualification. BJ then won a battle royale by eliminating Gorbea. After defeating and attacking a midcarder, Gorbea was confronted by BJ.

=== Feuding with Los Aéreos ===
On October 11, 2008, Díaz appeared in WWC as “Aquario”, revealing his identity prior to a loss to Gorbea. On October 24, 2008, Thunder and Lightning retained over Los Adorabels and Gorbea. He was then aided by a foreign referee to win his matches. He then lost to Angel. This feud continued with interventions by BJ. At Lockout, BJ defeated Gorbea to win the Puerto Rico Heavyweight Championship. Thunder and Lightning then defeated Gorbea and Charles Evans. Gorbea then wrestled Angel to a double countout. In singles, Díaz lost to Reyes due to the intervention of Gorbea. Reyes and Gorbea then defeated Los Aéreos with the help of Styles. Los Aéreos then defeated Gorbea and Aquilles. Gorbea then defeated Díaz with the intervention of Reyes. BJ then defeated Gorbea. Gorbea and Reyes then defeated Mulero and a jobber. Díaz then defeated Gorbea. Díaz then defeated Reyes despite the intervention of Gorbea. Díaz then defeated Gorbea, in a match where his girlfriend was attacked by his opponent's new female enforcer. Díaz continued defeating Gorbea. A rematch between Mulero and Reyes for the Junior Heavyweight Championship ended with Gorbea cheating to help his associate retain and another confrontation between Los Aéreos, when Díaz made the save but was confused as the attacker. A match between Díaz and Gorbea then ended in a time limit draw due to a brawl between Mulero and Reyes, leading to more clashes within Los Aéreos. Gorbea and other heels then approached Mulero and tried to convince him that Díaz was jealous, something that he did not dismiss. At Camino a la Gloria, Los Aéreos recon ciliated and defeated Gorbea's team in a 3 on 3 match. Gorbea and Styles then defeated Los Aéreos with the help of the referee. Gorbea's team then defeated Los Aéreos and Laureano in a 4 on 3 match. Thunder and Lightning then defeated Estrada and Gorbea. At Honor vs. Traición Gorbea defeated Díaz and Angel in a three-way match. Multiple run ins during a singles match then concluded with Gorbea, Estrada and Styles wrestling Thunder and Lightning and Angel. Díaz then defeated Gorbea after Reyes interfered. Angel then defeated Gorbea with the help of the referee. Gorbea then retained the Junior Heavyweight championship over Díaz and Reyes. Los Aéreos then defeated Reyes and Gorbea. Gorbea then retained the Junior Heavyweight championship over Díaz. Prior to Aniversario, Gorbea complained that he did not even have a match for the event and challenged Laureano, only to be confronted by Reyes, Mulero, Styles, Angel and Díaz. Laureano accepted the challenge on the condition that it was an extreme rules match, however the distraction costed him a match with BJ. La Pesadilla, Mac and Idol Steven then defeated Thunder and Lightning and Laureano, after Gorbea attacked the latter. The X match at Aniversario was won by Díaz.

=== Fake Chicky Starr, various promotions ===
Gorbea was then involved in a storyline where he dropped his gimmick of Tommy Diablo and appropriated José Laureano's Chicky Starr persona. He then appeared in a charity card. He won his first match of Septiembre Negro 2009 with the help of Reyes. The following date, Gorbea hosted an edition of the Chicky Starr Sport Shop and attempted to convince the former Chicky Starr to forfeit, only to be attacked and then beaten by Laureano in a match where the winner would keep the name. He no-showed the following card. He then lost to newcomer Ricochet. He continued jobbing and intervening in Ricochet's matches. At Halloween Wrestling Xtravaganza, Gorbea participated in a four-way match for the Junior Heavyweight Championship won by Ricochet. Díaz and Ricochet then defeated Mulero and Gorbea. Gorbea then no-showed a show. At Crossfire, Noriega defeated Sewell to become the Universal Heavyweight Champion with the help of Álvarez and Gorbea. On December 5, 2009, Gorbea made an appearance in independent promotion NPW. After WWC spoiled that Sewell had left to join to join the IWA and make a surprise appearance at Christmas in PR, they responded by filing a lawsuit prohibiting the use of the character of “Ricky Banderas” and forcing the use of “El Triple Mega Campeón“ as replacement. WWC's own Gorbea refute the content of the press release, becoming involved in a public dispute with BJ. On December 12, 2009, Díaz's team defeated Gorbea's team in the NPW's season closer. During the offseason, Díaz, Mulero and Gorbea made appearances in the season closer of independent promotion HWR. Díaz then defeated Gorbea. Gorbea then defeated Angel. In the continuation of this longstanding feud, he attacked Angel following a loss. He cheated his way to another win. Gorbea and Lynx participated in a three way where Ricochet won the WWC Junior Heavyweight Championship. Gorbea then defeated Ricochet to win the title. He retained in a rematch by convincing the referee that Ricochet had attacked him with a chain. Gorbea was then confronted by referee El Artache. He tried to pull off the same trick in a rematch against Ricochet, but referee Angel Fashion disqualified him. At Camino a la Gloria 2010, Ricochet won an X match for the WWC Junior Heavyweight Championship that included Lynx. Gorbea joined Lynx to defeat Doom Patrol. He then challenged Angel for the WWC Junior Heavyweight Championship. Angel defeated Tommy Diablo, Lynx and Ricochet to retain the title. On June 6, 2022, Diablo won a three-way match to become the WWC Junior Heavyweight Champion. Tommy Diablo made an open challenge for the Junior Heavyweight Championship but refused to accept El Comandante, whom he believe was not a cruiserweight wrestler, being forced by referee Angel Fashion and retaining. To open Aniversario 2010, Tommy Diablo retained the WWC Junior Heavyweight Championship over Lynx and Ricochet. The following night, Ricochet and the D’Jour Twins defeated Tommy Diablo and Los Fujitivos. At La Revolución, he intentionally got himself disqualified by unmasking Ricochet to retain. Before making another defense, the commission fined him for his actions. Angered, Diablo said that he preferred to quit and left, with Ricochet being named new Junior Heavyweight Champion. He appeared at EWO's Halloween Rage, losing to Bonecrusher. Diablo reappeared in the independent circuit, where he won the LLXI Junior Heavyweight Championship. He defended the title at LLXI Destino 2010. Competing in Panama, he won tag team titles along Pablo Marquez. He reappeared at EWO in Xmas Aggression, issuing a challenge.

=== Perennial Jr. Heavyweight Champion ===
Returning to WWC, Diablo defeated El Cuervo to win the Junior Heavyweight Championship. Tommy Diablo retained the Junior Heavyweight Championship against El Niche. At Camino a la Gloria 2011, Tommy Diablo defeated Ricochet. At Summer Madness, Tommy Diablo won a battle royale to win the WWC Junior Heavyweight Championship, last eliminating Ricochet. Ricochet and Jay Velez defeated Tommy Diablo and Angel, after the match an impersonator attacked the former. To open Aniversario 2011, Ricochet defeated Tommy Diablo to win the Junior Heavyweight Championship. Tommy Diablo and Johnny Ringo defeated Los Fujitivos to win the World Tag Team Championship. He defeated AJ Castillo. The titles were later stripped due to cheating. Gorbea continued appearing in NPW, losing to Shane Sewell in the promotion's anniversary show. He defeated Jay Vélez. Los Fujitivos defeated Tommy Diablo and Johnny Ringo, whose group also included El Cuervo. Ricochet defeated Tommy Diablo. Tommy Diablo defeated El Cuervo. At Crossfire, JJJ defeated Tommy Diablo. To open Lockout, Mr. Big and Tommy Diablo defeated JJJ and Johnny Ringo. The following night he unsuccessfully challenged JJJ for the Junior Heavyweight Championship. During the offseason, he wrestled for IWL. At La Hora de la Verdad, Tommy Diablo and El Cuervo wrestled to a time limit draw. Afterwards, Diablo retained over El Cuervo and JJJ. At Noche de Campeones, Tommy Diablo retained the Junior Heavyweight Championship over El Cuervo. Diablo and Díaz competed in the independent circuit for IGWA. Afterwards, Orlando Toledo and his Nuevo Mando turned on Diablo. At Camino a la Gloria, The Patriot defeated Tommy Diablo to win the Junior Heavyweight Championship. After losing a match to The Patriot, Diablo was attacked by WWC World Tag Team Champions Bolo and El Diabólico, being saved by El Cuervo. He appeared in Junte para la Historia, a charity card which included talent from several promotions. Cuervo and Diablo immediately began feuding with the champions. Both teams wrestled each other to a no contest. Tommy Diablo and El Cuervo defeated Bolo and Diabólico to win the World Tag Team Championship. Tommy Diablo and Cuervo defeated Thunder and Lightning by disqualification. To open Aniversario, Cuervo and Diablo defeated Philip Cardona and Angel. The main night, Los Arcángeles defeated Diabólico and Enyel to retain the World Tag Team Championship. The final night of the event, El Diabólico defeated Diablo. After El Cuervo left WWC for EWO, Diablo lost the titles to Diabólico and Enyel in a handicap match. In singles, he defeated El Diabólico. As the sole remaining “Arcángel”, he once again defeated El Diabólico at Septiembre Negro 2012. He reappeared by issuing a challenge to Ricochet for the WWC Junior Heavyweight Championship. Gorbea defeated Ricochet to win the Junior Heavyweight Championship. Their feud continued afterwards. To open Crossfire 2013, Syler Andrews defeated Tommy Diablo and Ricochet to win the Junior Heavyweight Championship. To open Euphoria, he teamed with Eric Scorpion in a loss to AJ Castillo and Syler Andrews. Gorbea then faced David Montes. El Diabólico then defeated Tommy Diablo. Tommy Diablo then defeated Ricochet to win the Junior Heavyweight Championship. At La Hora de la Verdad, Diablo retained over El Príncipe. At Camino a la Gloria, Gorbea retained the Junior Heavyweight Championship over JC Navarro. Fashion and Gorbea where involved in a confrontation, leading a match won by the latter, who made it clear that he was interested in the title. Fashion defeated Gorbea to win the Junior Heavyweight Championship. Fashion retained over Gorbea and Ricochet in a three-way match. At Summer Madness Ricochet defeated Gorbea to become the first contender for the Junior Heavyweight Championship. Fashion recovered the title and faced Ricochet and Tommy Diablo in a three-way match.

=== Various feuds, AAA ===
Abroad at Asistencia, Asesoría y Administración (AAA), Gorbea and Díaz competed in a three-way match for the AAA World Tag Team Championship, then held by Angélico & Jack Evans. Tommy Diablo defeated Fashion and Ricochet to win the Junior Heavyweight Championship. The team of Angel Fashion, Samuel Adams and David Montes defeated Tommy Diablo, AJ and Ricochet by cheating. This led to a match between Tommy Diablo and Fashion at Septiembre Negro, where the loser would be forced to become a full time referee. In the match, Fashion defeated Gorbea to win the Junior Heavyweight Championship and the stipulation. Gorbea debuted in the role later in the same night. Fashion then defended the title against Rikochet with Gorbea as the referee. Backstage, Fashion continued mocking Gorbea. Meanwhile, Gorbea helped Ricochet defeat Fashion by exposing his cheating. Ricochet defeated Fashion for the Junior Heavyweight Championship in a match where he was favored by Gorbea and Pelayo Vázquez returned to make the count. To open Aniversario 41, he appeared as referee. To continue the tour, Fashion attacked Gorbea backstage, who later made the count in his loss to Pelayo Vázquez. At Lockout, he participated in a Boricua Rumble for the Junior Heavyweight Championship that was won by Samuel Adams. At Euphoria 2015 unsuccessfully challenged Adams. At Aniversario, Tommy Diablo defeated Peter the Bad Romance to win the Junior Heavyweight Championship. Tommy Diablo, Rikochet and Peter the Bad Romance clashed in a three-way match for the Junior Heavyweight Championship. At Halloween Wrestling Xtravaganza, Tommy Diablo and Peter had a titular rematch. Tommy Diablo and El Cuervo faced La Revolución. At Lockout 2015, Peter retained in a four-way match over Rikochet, Tommy Diablo and Morgan. At Euphoria, Peter the Bad Romance defended against Tommy Diablo. Gorbea retained the Junior Heavyweight Championship over Rikochet. They clashed in a rematch. He participated in a battle royale where an opportunity for any title was in play. At La Hora de la Verdad, Rikochet defeated Tommy Diablo and Angel Cotto to win the Junior Heavyweight Championship. Tommy Diablo faced La Otra Parte de la Revolución. OT Fernández and Tommy Diablo faced The Banker's Club. Gorbea unsuccessfully challenged Angel Cotto for the title. This was followed by consecutive titular rematches. OT Fernández, JC Navarro and Tommy Diablo managed by Vanilla Vargas appeared at CMLL DragonMania 11. At Noche de Campeones, Tommy Diablo defeated Angel Cotto to win the Junior Heavyweight Championship. Jay Cobs defeated Tommy Diablo and Angel Cotto to win the Junior Heavyweight Championship. Jay Cobs retained over Tommy Diablo, OT Fernández and Angel Cotto. Tommy Diablo clashed with Angel Fashion. To open Aniversario, Tommy Diablo faced Angel Fashion. To continue the tour, Angel Cotto won a battle royale over Angel Fashion, Tommy Diablo, Enyel and OT Fernández to win the Junior Heavyweight Championship. To close the tour, El Diabólico defeated Diablo. To open Lockout 2016, Gorbea challenged Angel Cotto for the Junior Heavyweight Championship. Gorbea retained the Junior Heavyweight Championship over Angel Fashion, who took the belt afterwards. Angel Fashion defeated Gorbea to win the Junior Heavyweight Championship. In the continuation of their feud, González cheated to defeat Thunder, Lightning defeated Mike Mendoza to win an opportunity for the Puerto Rico Heavyweight Championship. Fernández then defended in a three-way match against Gorbea and Fashion.

=== IWA-PR return, WWL ===
At Impacto Total: El Tour, Cotto defeated Blitz and Tommy Diablo. Gorbea appeared at WWL, attending a press conference when the promotion joined FITE TV.

Afterwards Gorbea joined the World Wrestling League (WWL) in an on-camera and backstage role. He was part of the heel stable that joined Thunder and Lightning when they turned on their “Councilor” El Bronco, who requested help from a reluctant Huertas.

=== El Informante ===
In January 2023, El Informante faced Jay Velez. At Euphoria, he retained the Puerto Rico Heavyweight Championship over Jay Velez. At Honor vs. Traición, JC Jexx defeated El Informante to win the Television Championship. He often aided other heel wrestlers, which placed him at odds with the likes of Ray González and La Maldita Revolución. In the first round to crown a new Caribbean Heavyweight Champion, Mike Nice eliminated El Informante. At Aniversario, El Informante and Mr. Anthony defeated Pulli and JC Jexx. At Summer Madness, Jexx retained over El Informante. At La Noche que no Necesita Nombre, JC Jexx removed El Informante's mask, getting himself disqualified.

== Personal life ==
Gorbea graduated from Academia del Perpetuo Socorro, a San Juan Catholic high school, in 1999. That same year, he was admitted into the Pre-Medical program of the University of Puerto Rico at Río Piedras. Ultimately, he graduated as an accountant. Later in life, Gorbea earned a Juris Doctor and was admitted into the BAR, where he litigates civil, penal and family law cases. In May 2010, his father died.

== Championships and accomplishments ==
- International Wrestling Association
  - IWA Hardcore Championship (3 times)
  - IWA Cruiserweight Championship (1 time)
  - IWA Junior Heavyweight Championship (6 times)
- Lucha Xtrema Nacional de Panamá
  - LXN Tag Team Championship (2 times) - with Juventud Guerrera and Gran Tonka
- World Wrestling Council
  - WWC World Junior Heavyweight Championship (17 times)
  - WWC Puerto Rico Championship (1 time)
  - WWC World Tag Team Championship (2 times) - with Johnny Ringo (1) and Cuervo (1)
  - WWC Television Championship (2 times)

== See also ==
- Professional wrestling in Puerto Rico
