= Mike Lozansky =

Canadian professional wrestler (1968–2003)

Personal information
- Born: Michael Joseph Lozanski; 13 November 1968 Calgary, Alberta, Canada
- Died: 19 December 2003 (aged 35) Calgary, Alberta, Canada

Professional wrestling career
- Ring name(s): Mike Lozansky; Mike Anthony; Tigre Canadiense; Canadian Tiger
- Billed height: 5 ft 10 in (178 cm)
- Billed weight: 189 lb (86 kg)
- Trained by: Jesse Hernandez
- Debut: 1989
- Retired: 2002

Michael Lozanski (November 13, 1968 – December 19, 2003) was a Canadian professional wrestler who spent his career in Western Canada, Mexico, Japan, Memphis and Extreme Championship Wrestling in Philadelphia. He also competed as Mike Anthony and Tigre Canadiense.

== Professional wrestling career ==
Lozansky began his professional wrestling career in his hometown of Calgary, Alberta where he worked for Stampede Wrestling. Also worked in the Maritimes, Winnipeg and Vancouver.

In 1990, he worked for Steve Rickard in New Zealand. Then in 1991, he began working in Mexico as Tiger Candianese and later that year made his debut in Japan for New Japan Pro Wrestling.

Chris Jericho gives Lozansky praise for getting Jericho into Mexico in 1992. The two would become a tag team where Jericho got his name Lionheart.

In 1993, he made his debut in Memphis, Tennessee as Mike Anthony for United States Wrestling Association where he became a two time USWA World Tag Team Champion with Moondog Spike and Jeff Gaylord.

Lozansky made his debut in 1993 in Puerto Rico for World Wrestling Council where he teamed with Doby Gills for the tag team titles in 1994.

In 1995, Lozansky returned to Japan to work for All Japan Pro Wrestling.

He worked at the Stu Hart 50th Anniversary Show in Calgary where he teamed with King Lau losing to Gerry Morrow and the Cuban Assassin.

In 1996, he worked for Catch Wrestling Association in Germany.

From 1997 to 1998 he worked for World Championship Wrestling and the World Wrestling Federation in 1998.

In 1998 he worked for Extreme Championship Wrestling based in Philadelphia. He lost to Mikey Whipwreck at A Matter of Respect (1998) pay-per-view. He lost to ECW World Television Champion Rob Van Dam for a title shot on ECW Hardcore TV. He left ECW in early 1999.

Later in his career he worked in the independents in the States and Mexico.

He lost to Val Venis on the March 4, 2002 edition of Monday Night Raw.

== Death ==
Lozanky died on December 19, 2003, from a heart attack in his sleep at his home in Calgary. He was 35 years old.

Friend and colleague Moondog Manson made a tribute on his website to Lozansky a couple of days later after his death

== Championships and accomplishments ==
- United States Wrestling Association
  - USWA World Tag Team Championship (2 times) - with Moondog Spike (1) and Jeff Gaylord (1)
- International Wrestling Association (Puerto Rico)
  - IWA World Junior Heavyweight Championship (1 time)
- Wrestling International New Generations
  - W*ING World Junior Heavyweight Championship (2 times)
- World Wrestling Council
  - WWC World Tag Team Championship (2 times) – with Dobbie Gillies (2)
  - WWC World Junior Heavyweight Championship (2 times)

== Luchas de Apuestas record ==
Winner (wager)	Loser (wager)	Location	Event	Date	Notes
Villano IV (mask)	Tigre Canadiense (mask)	Naucalpan, State of Mexico	Live event	October 20, 1991	
Tigre Canadiense (hair)	Tamba (career)	Nezahualcoyotl, State of Mexico	Live event	February 28, 1992	
