= Angel Cotto =

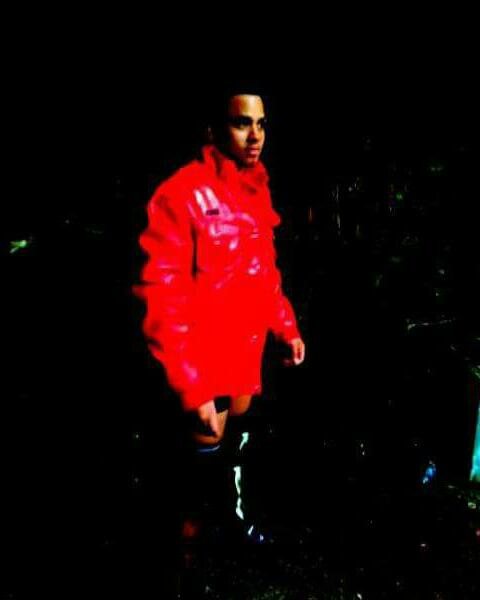

Personal information
- Born: Javier Omar Cotto Caguas, Puerto Rico

Professional wrestling career
- Ring name(s): Awesome Angel Cotto; El Hijo De Espanto; Mafia Kid
- Billed height: 5 ft 8 in (1.73 m)
- Billed weight: 190 lb (86 kg)
- Trained by: El Diamante
- Debut: 2000

Javier Omar Cotto, better known by his ring name Angel Cotto, is a Puerto Rican professional wrestler.

== Career ==
=== Early career (2000–2013) ===
Angel Cotto began his career in 2000 in the company PRWA, under the name of El Hijo Del Espanto(his father also wrestler, use the name of El Espanto in the early 1990s) later in 2002 he goes to BSP as Mafia Kid when he won the BSP Jr. Heavyweight Championship he was there till 2005 when he moved to Sacramento where he joined a local promotion California Wrestling Entertainment (CWE), and others promotion like Boricua Most Wanted (BMW) and Connecticut based LWA. in 2005 he retired to focus on music, he have a small Latin music group of merengue. He has 5 kids.

On 2007 he returned to Puerto Rico and return to BSP, later on 2010 he join NPW as Mafia Kid till 2012 Where he joins the EWO as part of Los Negativos as a masked wrestler named Suicidio as part of an angle against a group of wrestlers that were part of the campaign Ponte Pa Lo Positivo when he feud with El Sensacional Carlitos, Niche & Lynx, Mr Big and El Cuervo, he leaves EWO and join CWA when he unmasked himself, and reveals his name Angel Cotto soon he makes a team with Iro to win the ÇWA Tag Team Championship.

=== World Wrestling Council (2013–2020) ===
Cotto joined WWC on 2013, after several time of feud with WWC talent, on July 11, 2015, all the WWC Junior Heavyweight Division comes out to demand a rematch after that until then champion Peter The Bad Romance said that there was no one who defeated him on WWC, that week on TV showSuper Estrellas WWC was announced on Noche De Campeones one 5 way X Match style for the WWC Junior Heavyweight Championship where Angel Cotto grab the title to win for first time the WWC Junior Heavyweight Championship.

== Championships and accomplishments ==
- Borinquen Sport Promotions
  - BSP Junior Heavyweight Championship (1 time)
- Championship Wrestling Alliance
  - CWA Tag Team Championship (1 time) – with Iro
- Pro Wrestling Illustrated
  - PWI ranked him #311 of the top 500 singles wrestlers in the PWI 500 in 2016
- World Wrestling Council
  - WWC Junior Heavyweight Championship (4 times)

== See also ==
- Professional wrestling in Puerto Rico
