= Andy Anderson (wrestler) =

Canadian professional wrestler

Personal information
- Born: Andrew Anderson; February 22, 1975 (age 51) Winnipeg, Manitoba, Canada

Professional wrestling career
- Ring name(s): Andy Anderson; Andrew Anderson; Buff Anderson; Ayatollah Anderson; Deja Vu; Siberian Tiger; JT Atlas; Lone Wolf; Lobo; Lobo Blanci
- Billed height: 5 ft 10 in (1.78 m)
- Billed weight: 215 lb (98 kg)
- Billed from: Middle East (Ayatollah Anderson)
- Trained by: Vance Nevada
- Debut: June 6, 1996

Andrew Anderson (born February 22, 1975) better known by his ring name Andy Anderson is a Canadian professional wrestler who worked in Western Canada, and Puerto Rico.

== Professional wrestling career ==
Anderson made his wrestling debut in 1996 for the Canadian Wrestling Federation in Winnipeg as JT Atlas. He would team with his trainer, Vance Nevada. On October 27, 1997, Anderson lost to Perry Saturn in a dark match for WCW Monday Nitro. Also in 1997, Anderson would work in the Southern United States for IWA Mid-South and Music City Wrestling in Nashville. On August 29, 1998, he lost to Brickhouse Brown in a Loser Leaves Town match at Music City Wrestling and left the promotion.

During the summer of 1999, Anderson went to Japan for Battlarts. He teamed with Alexander Otsuka that November in a tag team tournament losing in the semifinals to Carl Malenko and Katsumi Usuda. After the tournament, Anderson left Japan and returned in August 2001.

In 1999, Anderson made his debut for the development territory for the World Wrestling Federation, IWA Puerto Rico known as the "Lone Wolf" where he had his biggest success of his career. Anderson worked in joint shows for IWA/WWF until both companies parted ways in 2001. Teamed with Steve Bradley as Club WWF in 2000 twice winning the IWA World Tag Team Championship. He won the IWA World Junior Heavyweight Championship three times as Lobo from 2001 to 2002, and twice with the IWA Hardcore Championship. He left Puerto Rico in 2004.

Anderson competed in WWE formerly World Wrestling Federation for Velocity losing to Rikishi on December 18, 2002 and lost to Orlando Jordan on August 9, 2003, in Kelowna, British Columbia.

Since leaving Puerto Rico in 2004, Anderson returned to Western Canada working in the independent circuit most notably Prairie Wrestling Association based in Calgary from 2011 to 2022.

In 2023, Anderson reunited with his trainer Vance Nevada as Nothing But Trouble for the first time since 1997. They currently work for in CanAM Wrestling in Alberta where they as the current tag team champions.

== Championships and accomplishments ==
- Canadian Wrestling Federation
  - CWF Canadian Unified Junior Heavyweight Championship (2 times)
  - CWF Tag Team Championship (2 times) - with Vance Nevada (2 times)
- CanAm Wrestling
  - CanAm Community Chaos Championship (3 times)
  - CanAm Heritage Heavyweight Championship (1 time)
  - CanAm Tag Team Championship (3 times) - with Vance Nevada
  - MexiFest Championship (1 time, current)
- International Wrestling Association
  - IWA World Junior Heavyweight Championship (3 times)
  - IWA World Tag Team Championship (4 times) - with Steve Bradley (2), Vyzago (1) and Eric Pérez (1)
  - IWA Hardcore Championship (2 times)
- Monster Pro Wrestling
  - MPW Heavyweight Championship (1 time)
- Prairie Wrestling Alliance
  - PWA Canadian Tag Team Championship (1 time) - with Sheik Akbar Shabaz
  - PWA Championship (1 time)
  - PWA Interim Championship (1 time)
  - PWA Mayhem Championship (1 time)
- Prime Time Wrestling
  - PTW Heavyweight Championship (1 time, current)
- Pro Wrestling Illustrated
  - PWI ranked him # 442 of the 500 best singles wrestlers of the PWI 500 in 1997
  - PWI ranked him # 233 of the 500 best singles wrestlers of the PWI 500 in 2001
- Western Canadian Championship Wrestling
  - WCCW Tag Team Championship (1 time) - with Vance Nevada
- Wild West Wrestling
  - WWW Tag Team Championship (1 time) - with Chi Chi Cruz
