= WWC World Junior Heavyweight Championship =

Professional wrestling championship

WWC Junior Heavyweight Championship
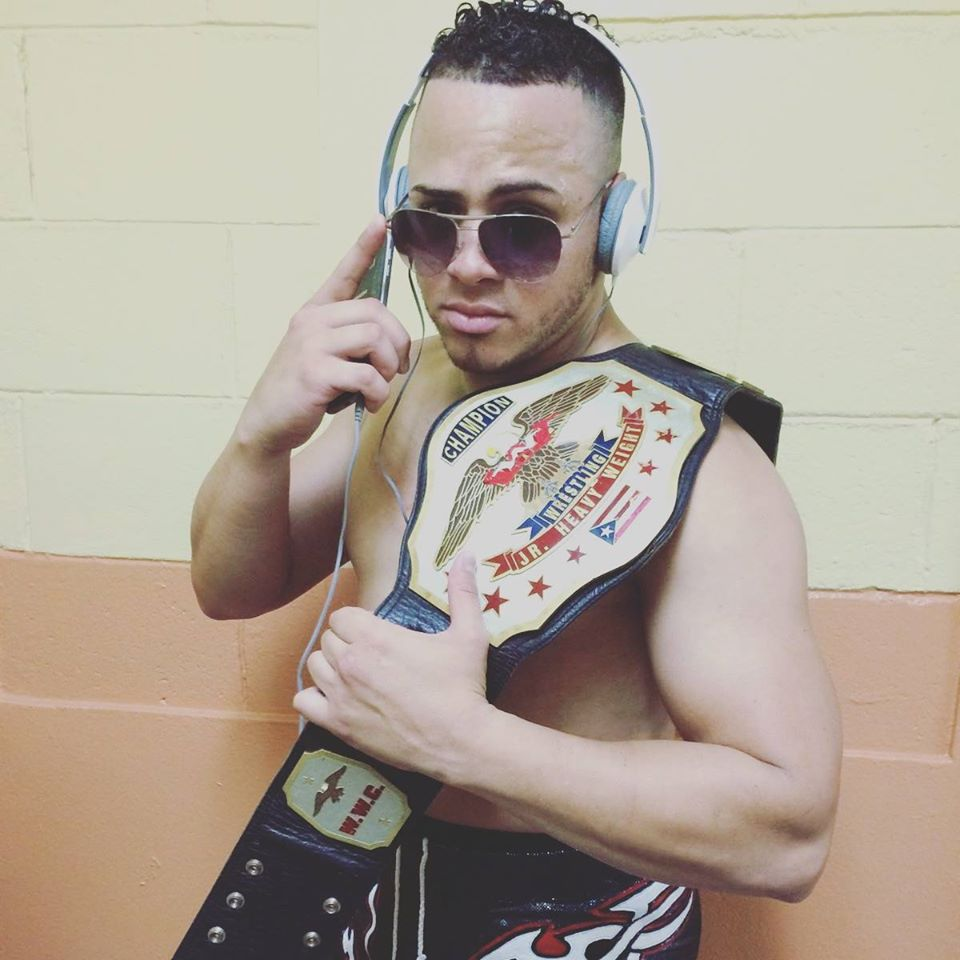
- Angel Cotto

Details
- Promotion: World Wrestling Council; Wrestling International New Generations; International Wrestling Association Florida
- Date established: December 14, 1974
- Current champion: Jovan
- Date won: September 26, 2026

Other names
- WWC World Junior Heavyweight Championship (1974–1991, 1994–2014, 2022-present); W*ING World Junior Heavyweight Championship (1992–1994); WWC American Lightweight Championship (1997); Puerto Rico Middleweight Championship (2018–2020)
Statistics
- First champion: Dick Steinborn
- Most reigns: Tommy Diablo (17 reigns)
- Longest reign: Les Thornton (471 days)
- Shortest reign: Manny Soto, Barrabás, Alex Montalvo and Brent Dail (24 hours)
- Oldest champion: Don Kent (53 years, 103 days)
- Youngest champion: Eddie Colón (18 years, 50 days)

The WWC Junior Heavyweight Championship is a championship contested for in the Puerto Rican professional wrestling promotion, the World Wrestling Council. While weight classes are generally not strictly adhered to in professional wrestling today, this particular championship is usually competed for by wrestlers weighing less than 230 lbs.

== History ==
For a time, the title was defended in the W*ING promotion in Japan as the W*ING World Junior Heavyweight Championship. Originally, the title was used to push a wrestler that the promotion was interested in, becoming a stepping stone on the route to the WWC Universal Heavyweight Championship. A pattern was followed where these talents would win the Junior Heavyweight Championship first, followed by tertiary and secondary titles, before progressing to the main event.

By the 2010s, promoting up-and-comers became a secondary function, with the title now being used to appease journeymen and occasionally punish wrestlers that failed to draw. Independent wrestlers and veterans such as Tommy Diablo (Armando Gorbea) would exchange the title, which served as a perpetual card opener.

=== 2017 international tours ===
After defeating Ángel Pérez to win the title for the first time and aware that it was no longer being used to push new or young talents, O.T. Fernández requested permission to take it abroad, citing interest in returning it to its original format and reputation by stating that he was "going to keep representing and showcasing the title with the best of [his] abilities [and that he wanted] to keep elevating this championship back to its old roots." In May 2017, he took the title on the Dragonmanía XII tour held at the Arena México, marking the first time in years that the title was exposed internationally, though it was not officially defended. On July 8, 2017, Fernández successfully retained the title over Aero Boy in a Cleveland Knights Championship Wrestling (CKCW) card held at Ohio.

His reign continued gathering outside exposition by making an appearance in a WAPA-TV comedy named "Such is Life". Fernández's successor, Ángel Cotto, continued the trend by defending the title at Chicago as part of IWC's Halloween In Your Face event, retaining against Julio "Vértigo" Rivera by getting himself disqualified.

=== Inactivity, IWA Florida (2018–2020) ===
After the title was quietly retired, the incumbent left WWC with the belt in his possession. On October 17, 2018, Cotto debuted in the rival World Wrestling League, where the fact that he never lost the WWC World Junior Heavyweight Championship was worked into a storyline that saw him challenge WWL Super Cruiserweight Champion Mark Davidson. On November 12, 2018, the actual belt made an appearance (as the "Puerto Rico Middleweight Championship") in a video announcing his arrival to IWA Florida, itself a spinoff of WWC's longstanding competition, the International Wrestling Association (IWA-PR). On December 7, 2018, the WWC World Junior Heavyweight Championship made its first physical appearance (though it was partially obscured) in WWL as part of Cotto's promotional skit for Black Xmas, where he felt short in his attempt to accomplish an extra-official unification.

On December 17, 2018, IWA Florida announced that he would be exposing the title in an open challenge at Histeria Boricua 2019. As part of that event, Papi Nieves won the belt and was attacked backstage. This led to a formal feud against Cotto. Nieves’ reign ended on March 16, 2019, when he dropped the belt back to its former owner at the IWA Arena. Cotto would then take it to Chicago, appearing in Global Wrestling Stars’ Noche Xtrema event. Even when entering a tournament for the IWA Florida Tag Team Championship, his incumbency as champion was emphasized.

When queried about carrying and defending the belt, Cotto said that he would return it to WWC if an “economic agreement is reached with Carlos Colón”. He continued being billed as the “incumbent champion” afterwards, making appearances in this role in August 2019.

=== Reintroduction (2021–present) ===
Following a nine-month hiatus caused by the COVID-19 pandemic, WWC announced that among the changes that would take place when cards resumed was a tournament for the World Junior Heavyweight Championship. This included the introduction of a new belt, to be awarded to the winner on January 31, 2021.

== Title history ==
Key
No.	Overall reign number
Reign	Reign number for the specific champion
Days	Number of days held

No.	Champion	Championship change			Reign statistics		Notes	Ref.
No.	Champion	Date	Event	Location	Reign	Days	Notes	Ref.
WWC World Junior Heavyweight Championship
1	Dick Steinborn	December 7, 1974	WWC show	Caguas, Puerto Rico	1	14	Won a 6-man tournament final.	
2	Carlos Colón	December 21, 1974	WWC show	Caguas, Puerto Rico	1	21		
3	Dick Steinborn	January 11, 1975	WWC show	Caguas, Puerto Rico	2	213		
4	Carlos Colón	August 12, 1975	WWC show	Bayamón, Puerto Rico	2	31		
5	Karl Moffatt	September 12, 1975	WWC show	Sabana Grande, Puerto Rico	1	239		
6	Dick Steinborn	May 8, 1976	WWC show	Caguas, Puerto Rico	2	144		
7	Carlos Colón	September 29, 1976	WWC show	Bayamón, Puerto Rico	3	251		
8	Webster Jackson	June 7, 1977	WWC show	Caguas, Puerto Rico	1	62		
9	El Divino Tony	August 8, 1977	WWC show	San Germán, Puerto Rico	1	30		
10	Dave Jackson	September 7, 1977	WWC show	San Juan, Puerto Rico	1	37		
11	James Jackson	October 14, 1977	WWC show	San Juan, Puerto Rico	1	51		
12	Manny Soto	December 4, 1977	WWC show	Mayagüez, Puerto Rico	1	1		
13	Roberto Soto	December 5, 1977	WWC show	San Juan, Puerto Rico	1	309		
14	James Jackson	October 10, 1978	WWC show	Adjuntas, Puerto Rico	2	306		
15	Huracan Castillo Jr.	August 12, 1979	WWC show	San Juan, Puerto Rico	1	29		
16	James Jackson	September 10, 1979	WWC show	Arecibo, Puerto Rico	3	9		
17	Sean Doolitle	September 19, 1979	WWC show	Bayamón, Puerto Rico	1	21		
18	James Jackson	October 10, 1979	WWC show	Maunabo, Puerto Rico	4	288		
19	Les Thornton	July 24, 1980	WWC show	San Juan, Puerto Rico	1	471	Also win the NWA World Junior Heavyweight Champion.	
20	Joe Lightfoot	November 7, 1981	WWC show	Bayamón, Puerto Rico	1	7		
21	Les Thornton	November 14, 1981	WWC show	San Juan, Puerto Rico	2	24		
22	Herbert Gonzalez	December 8, 1981	WWC show	Bayamón, Puerto Rico	1	263		
23	Dick Steinborn	August 28, 1982	WWC show	San Juan, Puerto Rico	3	68		
24	Jerry Brisco	November 4, 1982	WWC show	San Juan, Puerto Rico	1	41		
25	Divino Tony	December 15, 1982	WWC show	Bayamón, Puerto Rico	2	21		
26	Perro Aguayo	January 5, 1983	WWC show	Guadalajara, México	1	366		
27	Aníbal	January 6, 1984	WWC show	Bayamón, Puerto Rico	19	253	Also won the UWA World Junior Light Heavyweight Champion.	
28	Invader III	September 15, 1984	WWC Aniversario 1984	San Juan, Puerto Rico	1	54		
29	El Profe	November 8, 1984	WWC show	Bayamón, Puerto Rico	1	2		
30	Barrabás	November 10, 1984	WWC show	Guaynabo, Puerto Rico	1	1		
31	El Profe	November 11, 1984	WWC show	Bayamón, Puerto Rico	2	215		
32	Invader III	June 14, 1985	WWC show	Hormigueros, Puerto Rico	2	164	Defeat Denny Brown for the vacant title.	
33	Eric Embry	November 25, 1985	WWC show	Dorado, Puerto Rico	1	54		
34	Invader III	January 18, 1986	WWC show	San Juan, Puerto Rico	3	46		
35	Chicky Starr	March 5, 1986	WWC show	San Juan, Puerto Rico	1	14		
36	Invader III	March 19, 1986	WWC show	Caguas, Puerto Rico	4	24		
37	Chicky Starr	April 12, 1986	WWC show	Caguas, Puerto Rico	2	22		
38	Invader III	May 4, 1986	WWC show	Caguas, Puerto Rico	5	174		
39	Don Kent	October 25, 1986	WWC show	Caguas, Puerto Rico	1	25		
40	Invader III	November 19, 1986	WWC show	Caguas, Puerto Rico	6	115		
41	Frankie Lancaster	March 14, 1987	WWC show	Guaynabo, Puerto Rico	1	28		
—	Vacated	April 11, 1987	WWC show	Caguas, Puerto Rico.	—	—	Title held up after a match between Super Médico and Frankie Lancaster	
42	Frankie Lancaster	April 18, 1987	WWC show	San Juan, Puerto Rico	2	91	Defeat Super Médico in a rematch.	
43	Gran Mendoza	July 18, 1987	WWC show	San Juan, Puerto Rico	1	64		
44	Huracán Castillo Jr.	September 20, 1987	WWC Aniversario 1987	Bayamón, Puerto Rico	2	17		
45	Gran Mendoza	October 7, 1987	WWC show	Cataño, Puerto Rico	2	90		
46	Huracán Castillo Jr.	January 5, 1988	WWC show	Mayagüez, Puerto Rico	3	88		
47	Tony Falk	April 2, 1988	WWC show	San Juan, Puerto Rico	1	11		
48	Invader III	April 13, 1988	WWC show	Guaynabo, Puerto Rico	7	217		
49	El Profe	November 16, 1988	WWC show	Cataño, Puerto Rico	3	59		
50	Ricky Santana	January 14, 1989	WWC show	Caguas, Puerto Rico	1	78		
51	Jonathan Holiday	April 2, 1989	WWC show	Aguadilla, Puerto Rico	1	48		
52	Super Medico I	May 20, 1989	WWC show	Caguas, Puerto Rico	1	35		
53	Chicky Starr	June 24, 1989	WWC show	Caguas, Puerto Rico	3	35		
54	Super Médico I	July 29, 1989	WWC show	Caguas, Puerto Rico	2	182		
55	Eddie Watts	January 27, 1990	WWC show	Guaynabo, Puerto Rico	1	84		
56	Huracán Castillo Jr.	April 21, 1990	WWC show	Bayamón, Puerto Rico	4	126		
57	Ron Starr	August 25, 1990	WWC show	Caguas, Puerto Rico	1	21		
58	Invader IV	September 15, 1990	WWC show	Bayamón, Puerto Rico	1	11		
59	Ron Starr	September 26, 1990	WWC show	San Juan, Puerto Rico	2	10		
60	Huracán Castillo Jr.	October 6, 1990	WWC show	Bayamón, Puerto Rico	5	28		
61	Billy Joe Travis	November 3, 1990	WWC show	Bayamón, Puerto Rico	1	17		
62	Huracán Castillo Jr.	November 20, 1990	WWC show	Bayamón, Puerto Rico	6	81		
63	Mr. Pogo	February 9, 1991	WWC show	Caguas, Puerto Rico	1	57		
—	Vacated	April 7, 1991	WWC show	—	—	—	Title held up after a match between Mr. Pogo and Ricky Santana	
64	Ricky Santana	April 13, 1991	WWC show	Carolina, Puerto Rico	2	28		
65	Brad Anderson	May 11, 1991	WWC show	Guaynabo, Puerto Rico	1	14		
66	Ricky Santana	May 25, 1991	WWC show	Caguas, Puerto Rico	3	98		
67	Alex Porteau	August 31, 1991	WWC show	Cataño, Puerto Rico	1	42		
68	Ray González	October 5, 1991?	WWC show	Caguas, Puerto Rico	1	56		
—	Deactivated	November 30, 1991	—	—	—	—		
WWC/W*ING World Junior Heavyweight Championship.
69	Jimmy Backlund	June 12, 1992	W*ING show	Chiba, Japan	1	174	Won a 6-man tournament final.	
70	Ray González	December 3, 1992	W*ING show	Saitama, Japan	2	35		
71	Masayoshi Motegi	January 7, 1993	W*ING show	Tokyo, Japan	1	29		
72	Hiroshi Itakura	February 5, 1993	W*ING show	Tokyo, Japan	1	45		
73	Masayoshi Motegi	March 22, 1993	W*ING show	Osaka, Japan	2	38		
74	Tiger Mike Anthony	April 29, 1993	W*ING show	Tampa, Florida	1	10		
75	El Texano	May 9, 1993	W*ING show	Saitama, Japan	1	163		
76	Masayoshi Motegi	October 19, 1993	W*ING show	Tokyo, Japan	3	58		
77	Shinichi Nakano	December 16, 1993	W*ING show	Kawasaki, Japan	1	29		
78	Masayoshi Motegi	January 14, 1994	W*ING show	Toda, Japan	4	28		
79	Tiger Mike Anthony	February 11, 1994	W*ING show	Japan	2	36		
WWC World Junior Heavyweight Championship
80	Ken Wayne	March 19, 1994?	WWC show	Puerto Rico	1	721		
81	Tiger Mike Anthony	March 9, 1996	WWC show	Mayagüez, Puerto Rico	3	350		
WWC American Lightweight Championship
82	Chuck Singer	February 22, 1997	WWC show	Ponce, Puerto Rico	1	7		
83	Pablo Márquez	March 1, 1997	WWC show	Cabo Rojo, Puerto Rico	1	13		
84	Chuck Singer	March 15, 1997	WWC show	Caguas, Puerto Rico	2	21		
85	Alex G.	April 5, 1997	WWC show	Toa Alta, Puerto Rico	2	49		
86	Chuck Singer	May 24, 1997	WWC show	Humacao, Puerto Rico	3	12		
WWC World Junior Heavyweight Championship
87	Pablo Márquez	July 5, 1997	WWC show	Bayamón, Puerto Rico	2	63		
88	Tiger Mike Anthony	September 6, 1997	WWC show	Humacao, Puerto Rico	4	28		
—	Vacated	October 4, 1997	WWC show	—	—	—	Title vacated when Mike Anthony left WWC	
89	Steve Corino	October 25, 1997	WWC show	Gurabo, Puerto Rico	1	21	Defeat El Halcón.	
90	Jerry Estrada	November 15, 1997	WWC show	Cabo Rojo, Puerto Rico	1	28		
91	La Ley	December 13, 1997	WWC show	Caguas, Puerto Rico	1	24		
92	Jerry Estrada	January 6, 1998	WWC show	Caguas, Puerto Rico	2	221	Won the title by forfeit when Ley left the promotion.	
93	Rockero	August 15, 1998	WWC show	Caguas, Puerto Rico	1	189		
94	Sean Hill	February 20, 1999	WWC show	Humacao, Puerto Rico	1	91		
95	Rockero	May 22, 1999	WWC show	Guaynabo, Puerto Rico	2	42		
96	Maelo Huertas (Invader IV)	July 3, 1999	WWC show	Guaynabo, Puerto Rico	2	42		
97	Black Boy (Julio César Cruz)	August 14, 1999	WWC Aniversario 1999	Caguas, Puerto Rico	1	28		
98	Rockero	September 11, 1999	WWC show	Fajardo, Puerto Rico	3	21		
99	Black Boy	October 2, 1999	WWC show	Guaynabo, Puerto Rico	2	7		
100	Sean Hill	October 9, 1999	WWC show	Guaynabo, Puerto Rico	2	35		
101	Maelo Huertas	November 13, 1999	WWC show	Nagüabo, Puerto Rico	3	7		
102	Rockero	November 20, 1999	WWC show	Cayey, Puerto Rico	4	21		
103	Exotíco	December 11, 1999	WWC show	Guaynabo, Puerto Rico	1	56		
104	Rockero	February 5, 2000	WWC show	Caguas, Puerto Rico	5	28		
105	Exotíco	March 4, 2000	WWC show	Guaynabo, Puerto Rico	2	98		
106	Rockero	June 10, 2000	WWC show	Lares, Puerto Rico	6	98		
—	Vacated	September 16, 2000	—	—	—	—	Title held up	
107	Black Boy	September 30, 2000	WWC show	San Germán, Puerto Rico	3	56	Defeat Richie Santiago and Rockero in a 3-way match.	
108	Trailer Park Trash	November 25, 2000	WWC show	Carolina, Puerto Rico	1	21		
—	Vacated	December 16, 2000	—	—	—	—	Title vacated when Trash no-showed a title defense against Eddie Colón.	
109	Damien Steele	January 5, 2001	WWC show	Ponce, Puerto Rico	1	36	Defeat Eddie Colón, Richie Santiago, Black Boy and Rockero in a 5-way match.	
110	Eddie Colón	February 10, 2001	WWC show	Carolina, Puerto Rico	1	7		
111	Damien Steele	February 17, 2001	WWC show	Manatí, Puerto Rico	2	21		
112	Eddie Colón	March 10, 2001	WWC show	Morovis, Puerto Rico	2	168		
113	Barrabás Jr.	August 25, 2001	WWC show	Manatí, Puerto Rico	1	49		
114	Eddie Colón	October 13, 2001	WWC show	Carolina, Puerto Rico	3	14		
115	Justin Sane	October 27, 2001	WWC show	Carolina, Puerto Rico	1	28	Defeat Eddie Colón, Barrabás, Jr. in 3-way match.	
116	Eddie Colón	November 24, 2001	WWC show	Caguas, Puerto Rico	4	43		
117	Rey Mysterio Jr.	January 6, 2002	WWC show	Caguas, Puerto Rico	1	90		
119	Eddie Colón	April 6, 2002	WWC show	Humacao, Puerto Rico	5	252	Defeated Rey Mysterio and Justin Sane in a 3-way match.	
120	Tommy Diablo	December 14, 2002	WWC show	Caguas, Puerto Rico	1	14		
121	Eddie Colón	December 28, 2002	WWC show	Caguas, Puerto Rico	6	9		
122	Tommy Diablo	January 6, 2003	WWC show	Caguas, Puerto Rico	2	12		
123	Alex Montalvo	January 18, 2003	WWC show	San Lorenzo, Puerto Rico	1	7	Defeat Diablo and Brent Dail in a 3-way match.	
124	Tommy Diablo	January 25, 2003	WWC show	Cayey, Puerto Rico	3	21		
126	Brent Dail	February 15, 2003	WWC show	Ponce, Puerto Rico	1	35	Defeat Diablo and Alex Montalvo in a 3-way match.	
127	Livewire	March 22, 2003	WWC show	Morovis, Puerto Rico	1	28	Defeat Brent Dail, Alexander Montalvo, Pablo Márquez, New York Hit Squad #1 and New York Hit Squad #2 in a 6-way elimination match.	
128	Alex Montalvo	April 19, 2003	WWC show	Carolina, Puerto Rico	2	29		
129	New York Hit Squad #2	May 18, 2003	WWC show	Carolina, Puerto Rico	1	6		
130	Pablo Márquez	May 24, 2003	WWC show	Bayamón, Puerto Rico	3	7		
131	Alex Montalvo	May 31, 2003	WWC show	Carolina, Puerto Rico	3	49		
132	José Rivera Jr.	July 19, 2003	WWC Aniversario 2003	Carolina, Puerto Rico	1	27		
133	Alex Montalvo	August 15, 2003	WWC show	Carolina, Puerto Rico	4	1		
134	Diabólico	August 16, 2003	WWC show	Nagüabo, Puerto Rico	1	21		
135	Pablo Márquez	September 6, 2003	WWC show	Caguas, Puerto Rico	4	42	Defeat Diabólico and Alex Montalvo in a 3-way match.	
136	Alex Montalvo	October 18, 2003	WWC show	Santa Isabel, Puerto Rico	5	42		
137	Maniac	November 29, 2003	WWC show	Bayamón, Puerto Rico	1	21		
138	Diabólico	December 20, 2003	WWC show	Caguas, Puerto Rico	2	23		
139	MarcuS Falk	January 12, 2004	WWC show	N/A	1	47		
140	Pablo Márquez	February 28, 2004	WWC show	Caguas, Puerto Rico	5	28		
141	Rockero	March 27, 2004	WWC show	Caguas, Puerto Rico	7	98		
142	Brent Dail	July 3, 2004	WWC show	Caguas, Puerto Rico	2	14		
143	Maniac	July 17, 2004	WWC show	San Juan, Puerto Rico	2	35		
144	Kid Kash	August 21, 2004	WWC Aniversario 2004	Caguas, Puerto Rico	1	35		
145	Alex Montalvo	September 25, 2004	WWC show	Carolina, Puerto Rico	6	14		
146	Brent Dail	October 9, 2004	WWC show	Gurabo, Puerto Rico	3	15		
147	Alex Montalvo	October 24, 2004	WWC show	Camuy, Puerto Rico	7	32		
148	Juventud Guerrera	November 25, 2004	WWC show	Caguas, Puerto Rico	1	9		
149	Alex Montalvo	December 4, 2004	WWC show	Caguas, Puerto Rico	8	6		
150	Brent Dail	December 10, 2004	WWC show	Caguas, Puerto Rico	4	1		
151	Alex Montalvo	December 11, 2004	WWC show	Hatillo, Puerto Rico	9	35		
152	Brent Dail	January 15, 2005	WWC show	Arroyo, Puerto Rico	5	35		
153	Chris Joel	February 19, 2005	WWC show	Caguas, Puerto Rico	1	35		
154	"Jumping" Jeff Jeffrey	March 26, 2005	WWC show	Caguas, Puerto Rico	1	28		
155	Brent Dail	April 23, 2005	WWC show	Carolina, Puerto Rico	6	7	Defeat Jumping Jeff Jeffrey, Alex Montalvo, A.J. Marley and Justin Sane in a 5-way elimination match.	
156	"Jumping" Jeff Jeffrey	April 30, 2005	WWC show	Peñuelas, Puerto Rico	2	112		
157	Superstar Romeo	August 20, 2005	WWC show	Carolina, Puerto Rico	1	77		
158	Stefano	November 5, 2005	WWC Aniversario 2005	Bayamón, Puerto Rico	1	29	N/A	
159	Maniac	December 4, 2005	WWC show	Lares, Puerto Rico	3	6		
160	Elí Rodríguez	December 10, 2005	WWC show	Bayamón, Puerto Rico	1	112		
161	Stefano	April 1, 2006	WWC show	Cayey, Puerto Rico	2	35		
162	Brent Dail	May 6, 2006	WWC show	Caguas, Puerto Rico	7	56	Defeat Stefano and Gama Singh, Jr. in a 3-way match.	
163	Superstar Romeo	July 1, 2006	WWC show	Bayamón, Puerto Rico	2	14		
164	Brent Dail	July 15, 2006	WWC show	Bayamón, Puerto Rico	8	28		
165	José Rivera, Jr.	August 12, 2006	WWC Aniversario 2006	Bayamón, Puerto Rico	2	20		
166	Brent Dail	September 1, 2006	WWC show	Caguas, Puerto Rico	9	8	Defeat José Rivera, Jr. and Hammett in a 3-way match.	
167	Hammett	September 9, 2006	WWC show	Ponce, Puerto Rico	1	28		
168	Brent Dail	October 7, 2006	WWC show	Bayamón, Puerto Rico	10	47		
169	Hammett	November 23, 2006	WWC show	Carolina, Puerto Rico	2	114	Defeat Brent Dail, Elí Rodríguez and Rick Stanley in a 4-way battle royal.	
170	Rick Stanley	March 17, 2007	WWC show	Bayamón, Puerto Rico	4	29	Rick Stanley formerly known as Maniac.	
171	BJ	April 15, 2007	WWC show	Peñuelas, Puerto Rico	1	6		
172	Rick Stanley	April 21, 2007	WWC show	Barranquitas, Puerto Rico	5	21		
173	BJ	May 12, 2007	WWC show	Bayamón, Puerto Rico	2	126		
174	William de la Vega	September 15, 2007	WWC show	Caguas, Puerto Rico	1	91	Defeat BJ, Hammett, Rick Stanley, El Niche and Dave Dijour in a 6-man X match.	
175	El Niche	December 15, 2007	WWC show	Caguas, Puerto Rico	1	21		
—	Vacated	January 5, 2008	—	—	—	—	Vacated after Niche jumps to IWA	
176	Ricky Reyes	March 7, 2009	WWC show	Bayamón, Puerto Rico	1	42	Defeat Tommy Diablo, "El Hombre Bestia" Angel, El Sensacional Carlitos, Johnny Styles and Hiram Túa in a 6-man X match.	
177	"El Hombre Bestia" Angel	April 18, 2009	WWC show	Aguas Buenas, Puerto Rico	1	28		
178	Tommy Diablo	May 16, 2009	WWC show	Caguas, Puerto Rico	4	56	Defeat El Sensacional Carlitos and "El Hombre Bestia" Angel in a 3-way match.	
179	El Sensacional Carlitos	July 11, 2009	WWC Aniversario 2009	San Juan, Puerto Rico	1	70	Defeat "El Hombre Bestia" Angel, Chicky Starr, Hiram Tua, Johnny Styles, Ricky Reyes and Tommy Diablo in a 7-man X match.	
180	Ricky Reyes	September 19, 2009	WWC show	Arecibo, Puerto Rico	2	42		
181	Rikochet	October 31, 2009	WWC show	Bayamón, Puerto Rico	1	98	Defeat Ricky Reyes, "El Hombre Bestia" Angel and Tommy Diablo in a fatal 4-way match.	
182	Lynx	February 6, 2010	WWC show	Bayamón, Puerto Rico	1	14		
183	Rikochet	February 20, 2010	WWC show	Bayamón, Puerto Rico	2	7	Defeat Lynx and Tommy Diablo in a 3-way match.	
184	Tommy Diablo	February 27, 2010	WWC show	Ponce, Puerto Rico	5	21		
185	"El Hombre Bestia" Angel	March 20, 2010	WWC show	Bayamón, Puerto Rico	2	14		
186	Rikochet	April 3, 2010	WWC show	Carolina, Puerto Rico	3	21	Defeat "El Hombre Bestia" Angel, Niche and Lynx in a 4-way X match.	
187	Lynx	April 24, 2010	WWC show	Bayamón, Puerto Rico	2	14		
188	"El Hombre Bestia" Angel	May 8, 2010	WWC show	Lajas, Puerto Rico	3	29		
189	Tommy Diablo	June 6, 2010	WWC show	Bayamón, Puerto Rico	6	76	Defeat "El Hombre Bestia" Angel & Rikochet in a 3-way match.	
190	Rikochet	August 21, 2010	WWC show	Cabo Rojo, Puerto Rico	4	63		
191	Lynx	October 23, 2010	WWC show	Bayamon, Puerto Rico	3	7		
192	Rikochet	October 30, 2010	WWC show	Manatí, Puerto Rico	5	14	"El Hombre Bestia" Angel was especial referee.	
193	"El Hombre Bestia" Angel	November 13, 2010	WWC show	Bayamón, Puerto Rico	4	14		
194	Rikochet	November 27, 2010	WWC show	Bayamón, Puerto Rico	6	15	Defeat "El Hombre Bestia Angel" in an extreme rules match.	
195	El Niche	December 12, 2010	WWC show	Bayamón, Puerto Rico	2	41	Defeat "El Hombre Bestia" Angel, Lynx and Rikochet in a 3-way match.	
196	Lynx	January 22, 2011	WWC show	Bayamón, Puerto Rico	4	7		
197	El Niche	January 29, 2011	WWC show	Gurabo, Puerto Rico	3	7		
198	Rikochet	February 5, 2011	WWC show	Carolina, Puerto Rico	7	21		
199	Cuervo	February 26, 2011	WWC show	Bayamón, Puerto Rico	1	15		
200	Tommy Diablo	March 13, 2011	WWC show	Moca, Puerto Rico	7	35		
201	Rikochet	April 17, 2011	WWC show	Carolina, Puerto Rico	8	6	Defeat Tommy Diablo and Cuervo in a 3-way match.	
202	Tommy Diablo	April 23, 2011	WWC show	Bayamón, Puerto Rico	8	21		
203	Cuervo	May 14, 2011	WWC show	Carolina, Puerto Rico	2	21		
204	Tommy Diablo	June 4, 2011	WWC show	Caguas, Puerto Rico	9	41		
205	Rikochet	July 15, 2011	WWC Aniversario 2011	Ponce, Puerto Rico	9	29		
206	"El Hombre Bestia" Angel	August 13, 2011	WWC show	Carolina, Puerto Rico	5	78		
207	"Jumping" Jeff Jeffrey	October 30, 2011	WWC show	Caguas, Puerto Rico	3	104		
208	Tommy Diablo	February 11, 2012	WWC show	San Juan, Puerto Rico	10	56	Defeat "Jumping" Jeff Jefrey and Cuervo in a 3-way match.	
209	The Patriot #1	April 7, 2012	WWC show	Bayamon, Puerto Rico	1	56		
210	Jay Vélez	June 2, 2012	WWC show	Ponce, Puerto Rico	1	118		
211	Barrabás Jr.	September 28, 2012	WWC show	Caguas, Puerto Rico	2	30		
212	Jay Vélez	October 28, 2012	WWC show	Bayamón, Puerto Rico	2	13	Defeat Barrabás Jr. and AJ Castillo in a 3-way match.	
213	Steve Joel	November 10, 2012	WWC show	Bayamón, Puerto Rico	1	7		
214	AJ Castillo	November 17, 2012	WWC show	Ponce, Puerto Rico	1	77		
215	Diabólico	February 2, 2013	WWC show	Bayamón, Puerto Rico	3	42		
216	Zcion RT One	March 16, 2013	WWC show	Bayamón, Puerto Rico	1	105		
217	AJ Castillo	June 29, 2013	WWC show	Caguas, Puerto Rico	2	49	Win a 6-man royal battle 3rd rope elimination.	
218	Rikochet	August 17, 2013	WWC show	Bayamón, Puerto Rico	10	56	Defeat AJ Castillo, Steve Joel and Diabólico in a fatal 4-way match.	
219	Tommy Diablo	October 12, 2013	WWC show	Bayamón, Puerto Rico	11	5		
220	Rikochet	October 17, 2013	WWC show	Bayamón, Puerto Rico	11	30		
221	Syler Andrews	November 16, 2013	WWC show	Bayamón, Puerto Rico	1	64	Defeat Rikochet and Tommy Diablo in a 3-way match.	
222	AJ Castillo	January 19, 2014	WWC show	Bayamón, Puerto Rico	3	19		
223	Syler Andrews	February 7, 2014	WWC show	Bayamón, Puerto Rico	2	22		
224	Rikochet	March 1, 2014	WWC show	Bayamón, Puerto Rico	12	14		
225	Tommy Diablo	March 15, 2014	WWC show	Bayamón, Puerto Rico	12	56		
226	Ángel Fashion	May 10, 2014	WWC show	Bayamón, Puerto Rico	1	42		
227	Mike Mendoza	June 21, 2014	WWC show	Bayamón, Puerto Rico	1	7		
228	Ángel Fashion	June 28, 2014	WWC show	Cataño, Puerto Rico	2	42		
229	Tommy Diablo	August 9, 2014	WWC show	Bayamón, Puerto Rico	13	28	Defeat Ángel Fashion and Rikochet in 3-way match.	
230	Ángel Fashion	September 6, 2014	WWC show	Bayamón, Puerto Rico	3	21	If Diablo lose, he'll become a referee.	
231	Rikochet	September 27, 2014	WWC show	Bayamón, Puerto Rico	13	42		
WWC Junior Heavyweight Championship
232	Samuel Adams	November 8, 2014	WWC show	Bayamón, Puerto Rico	1	105		
233	Rikochet	February 21, 2015	WWC show	Bayamón, Puerto Rico	14	21		
234	Peter The Bad Romance	March 14, 2015	WWC show	Bayamón, Puerto Rico	1	140		
235	Ángel Cotto	August 1, 2015	WWC show	Bayamón, Puerto Rico	1	14	This was a X Match also involving Mr. Revolution Morgan, O.T. Férnandez, Rikochet & Peter The Bad Romance.	
236	Peter The Bad Romance	August 15, 2015	WWC show	Bayamón, Puerto Rico	2	42		
237	Tommy Diablo	September 26, 2015	WWC Aniversario 2015	Bayamón, Puerto Rico	14	21		
238	Peter The Bad Romance	October 17, 2015	WWC show	Bayamón, Puerto Rico	3	94	Defeat Diablo and Rikochet in 3-way match.	
239	Tommy Diablo	January 9, 2016	WWC show	Bayamón, Puerto Rico	15	39		
240	Rikochet	February 27, 2016	WWC show	Bayamón, Puerto Rico	15	8	Defeat Tommy Diablo and Ángel Cotto in a 3-way match.	
241	Ángel Cotto	March 6, 2016	WWC show	Bayamón, Puerto Rico	2	132		
242	Tommy Diablo	July 16, 2016	WWC show	Bayamón, Puerto Rico	16	28		
243	Jay-Cobs	August 13, 2016	WWC show	Bayamón, Puerto Rico	1	63	Defeat Tommy Diablo and Ángel Cotto in 3-way match.	
244	Ángel Cotto	October 15, 2016	WWC Aniversario 2016	Bayamón, Puerto Rico	3	48	This was a Battle Royal against Jay- Cobs, Ángel Fashion, Tommy Diablo, "El Hombre Bestia" Angel, O.T. Fernández and El Paparazzi.	
245	Tommy Diablo	December 2, 2016	WWC show	Ponce, Puerto Rico	17	78		
246	Ángel Fashion	February 18, 2017	WWC show	Bayamón, Puerto Rico	4	29		
247	O.T. Fernández	March 19, 2017	WWC show	Bayamón, Puerto Rico	1	139		
248	Peter The Bad Romance	August 5, 2017	WWC show	Bayamón, Puerto Rico	4	22		
249	Ángel Cotto	August 27, 2017	WWC show	Bayamón, Puerto Rico	4	64 (503†)	Defeat Peter Peter The Bad Romance and O.T. Fernandez in a 3-way match.	
—	Deactivated	October 30, 2017	—	—	—	—		
Puerto Rico Middleweight Championship (IWA Florida)
†	Papi Nieves	January 12, 2019	IWA-FL Histeria Boricua	Orlando, Florida	1†	63	Defeated Cotto at Histeria Boricua 2019. Tough its official name was not acknowledged, WWC personnel including Carly Colón were involved in the event.	
†	Ángel Cotto	March 16, 2019	IWA-FL Choque de Dinastías	Orlando Florida	5†	665	Part of Choque de Dinastías, where Colón became the first WWC wrestler to win a title under the IWA brand.	
WWC Junior Heavyweight Championship
250	Justin Dynamite	January 31, 2021	WWC Cuentas Pendientes	San Juan, Puerto Rico	1	293	Title was reactivated and vacancy filled in tournament. The final aired on February 6, 2021, with Dynamite defeating Will Austin.	
251	Androide 787	November 20, 2021	N/A	Hatillo, Puerto Rico	1	105		
252	Justin Dynamite	March 5, 2022	N/A	Manati, Puerto Rico	2	28		
253	Emil Roy	April 2, 2022	N/A	Manati, Puerto Rico	1	126		
254	Androide 787	August 6, 2022	Aniversario 49	Bayamon, Puerto Rico	2	126	Defeats Roy, Jovan, and Pablo Marquez in a 4-way match.	
255	Jovan	December 10, 2022	N/A	Manati, Puerto Rico	1	105	Defeats Androide, Brandon the Skater, and Emil Roy in a 4-way match.	
256	Brandon the Skater	March 25, 2023	N/A	San Juan, Puerto Rico	1	91		
257	Jovan	June 24, 2023	Aniversario 50	Bayamon, Puerto Rico	2	126	Defeats Skater and Diego Luna in a 3-way match.	
258	Diego Luna	October 28, 2023	N/A	Bayamon, Puerto Rico	1	84		
259	El Informante	January 20, 2024	N/A	Bayamon, Puerto Rico	1	168	Defeat Diego Luna, El Hijo del Enigma and Brandon Skater in a 4-way match.	
260	Sr. Anthony	April 13, 2024	N/A	Bayamon, Puerto Rico	1	28	Defeats El Informante, Diego Luna, and Brandon Skater in a 4-way match.	
—	Vacated	May 11, 2024	WWC show	Bayamón, Puerto Rico	—	—	Title stripped due to Sr. Anthony being over the weight limit.	
261	El Informante	May 19, 2024	N/A	Bayamon, Puerto Rico	2	104	Title awarded.	
262	Sr. Anthony	August 31, 2024	N/A	Bayamón, Puerto Rico	2	28		
—	Vacated	September 28, 2024	WWC show	Bayamón, Puerto Rico	—	—	Title stripped by Gilbert.	
263	El Informante	December 14, 2024	Lockout	Bayamón, Puerto Rico	3	28	Defeat Vinny Pacífico for the vacant title.	
264	J.C. Jexx	January 11, 2025	Euphoria	Bayamón, Puerto Rico	1	231		
265	Brandon the Skater	August 30, 2025	Aniversario 52	Bayamón, Puerto Rico	2	105		
266	Jovan	December 13, 2025	N/A	Bayamón, Puerto Rico	3	259		
267	Brandon The Skater	August 29, 2026	La Noche Que No Necesita Nombre	Bayamón, Puerto Rico	3	28		
268	Jovan	September 26, 2026	Septiembre Negro 2026	Bayamón, Puerto Rico	4	30		
