= IWA World Junior Heavyweight Championship =

Details
- Promotion: International Wrestling Association
- Date established: 1999
- Date retired: 2006

Other name
- Unified World Junior Heavyweight Championship
Statistics
- Most reigns: Blitz (8 reigns)
- Longest reign: Mr. Águila (264 days)
- Shortest reign: Andrés Borges (<1 day)

The IWA World Junior Heavyweight Championship was a title for wrestlers that weight 225 pounds and under that was being defended in the International Wrestling Association in Puerto Rico. The championship is generally contested in professional wrestling matches, in which participants execute scripted finishes rather than contend in direct competition.

== Inaugural Tournament (1999) ==
Participants of the Inaugural tournament were: Super Crazy, Tajiri, Christopher Daniels, Mr. Águila, Black Scorpion, Danny Boy, Pablo Marquez, Pepe Prado, Reckless Youth, Taka Michinoku, Alexander Otsuka, The Great Sasuke, Tiger Mask IV and Jeff Hardy

First round
1	Pablo Marquez
16	Danny Boy	W
8	Christopher Daniels	W
9	Pepe Prado
5	Reckless Youth
12	Taka Michinoku	W
4	Alexander Otsuka
13	Aguila	W
6	Jeff Hardy
11	Super Crazy	W
3	The Great Sasuke
14	Tiger Mask IV
7	Black Scorpion
10	Tajiri	W
2	BYE
15	BYE

Quarter-finals
Danny Boy
Christopher Daniels	W
Taka Michinoku
Aguila	W
Super Crazy
BYE
Tajiri
BYE

Semi-finals
Christopher Daniels
Aguila	W
Super Crazy
Tajiri	W

Final
Aguila	W
Tajiri

== Title history ==
#	Wrestler:	Times:	Date:	Place:	Event	Notes:	Ref.
	IWA World Junior Heavyweight Championship (1994)						
1	Mike Anthony	1	February 5, 1994	San Juan, Puerto Rico	House Show	Won a tournament final and also defeat Masayoshi Motegi to win the W*ING World Junior Heavyweight Championship on february 11, 1994 in Japan.	
—	Deactivate	—	February 26, 1994	San Juan, Puerto Rico	House Show		
	IWA World Junior Heavyweight Championship (1999-2006)						
2	Mr. Águila	1	May 21, 1999	Carolina, Puerto Rico	Zona Caliente	Defeated Tajiri in a tournament final to Crown the inaugural champion.	
3	MIKAMI	1	February 9, 2000	Guadalajara, Mexico	Impacto Total	Phantom title change when Mr. Águila left to focus in WWF. (He would switch to Essa Rios character)	
4	Sean Hill	1	March 11, 2000	Arroyo, Puerto Rico			
5	Ismael Feliciano	1	May 20, 2000	Carolina, Puerto Rico			
6	Andrés Borges	1	June 3, 2000	Ponce, Puerto Rico			
7	Ismael Feliciano	2	June 4, 2000	Cataño, Puerto Rico			
8	Jesus Cristobal	1	June 17, 2000	Humacao, Puerto Rico			
9	Andrés Borges	2	August 19, 2000	Manati, Puerto Rico			
10	Sean Hill	2	August 19, 2000	Manati, Puerto Rico		Awarded the title by his tag team partner Borges.	
11	Andrés Borges	3	September 30, 2000	Guaynabo, Puerto Rico		Hill returned the title after defeating him in a non-title match with Borges being upset over losing a match to his tag team partner.	
12	Tommy Diablo	1	October 14, 2000	Yabucoa, Puerto Rico			
	Vacated		October 21, 2000			Title vacated due to an injury.	
13	Paparazzi	1	October 21, 2000			Defeated Sean Hill to win the vacant title.	
14	Juventud Guerrera	1	October 26, 2000	Juana Diaz, Puerto Rico	IWA TV Taping	Tag Team Match stipulation by Commissioner Heriberto Lopez. Juventud Guerrera & Sean Hill defeated Paparazzi & Super Crazy	
15	Sean Hill	3	October 28, 2000	Bayamón, Puerto Rico	IWA TV Taping	Defeated Juventud Guerrera, Paparazzi and Andrés Borges.	
	Unified World Junior Heavyweight Championship						
16	Super Crazy	1	December 10, 2000	Moca, Puerto Rico		Defeated Pablo Márquez in a title vs title match for the UWA and IWA World Junior Heavyweight titles on February 24, 2001 in Bayamón, Puerto Rico to be first the Unified World Junior Heavyweight Champion.	
17	Andy Anderson	1	April 21, 2001	Carolina, Puerto Rico			
18	Super Crazy	2	June 23, 2001	Bayamón, Puerto Rico			
19	Crash Holly	1	July 27, 2001	Bayamón, Puerto Rico	Summer Attitude (2001)	Defeated N.Y. Rican Baldie for the IWA Hardcore title in a 24/7 rule later defeated Super Crazy for the IWA/UWA Unified World Junior Heavyweight titles.	
20	Super Crazy	3	July 28, 2001	Carolina, Puerto Rico	Summer Attitude (2001)	Defeated Crash Holly and Andy Anderson in a 3-way match for the IWA Hardcore and the IWA/UWA Unified World Junior Heavyweight titles.	
	Vacated		December 8, 2001	Orocovis, Puerto Rico		Titles stripped by IWA general manager Savio Vega.	
21	Andy Anderson	2	December 8, 2001	Orocovis, Puerto Rico		Defeated Minoru Fujita for the IWA/UWA Unified World Junior Heavyweight titles.	
22	Minoru Fujita	1	January 6, 2002	Bayamón, Puerto Rico	Histeria Boricua (2002)		
23	Andy Anderson	3	February 2, 2002	Bayamón, Puerto Rico		The IWA General Manager Savio Vega stripped the UWA World Junior Heavyweight Championship on February 26, 2002 in Bayamón, Puerto Rico.	
	IWA World Junior Heavyweight Championship						
24	Chicano	1	March 2, 2002	Bayamón, Puerto Rico			
—	Vacated	—	March 23, 2002		Zona Caliente	Declared vacant by Victor Quiñones after a controversial match with Anarchy as both of them were not suitable for the junior division anymore.	
25	Stefano	1	April 6, 2002	Carolina, Puerto Rico	Juicio Final II	Defeated Tommy Diablo and Diabólico in a 3-way match for the vacant title.	
—	Vacated	—	April 27, 2002			Title held up after a controversial match between Diabólico and Stefano.	
26	Stefano	2	May 4, 2002	Bayamón, Puerto Rico		Defeated Diabólico to regain the title.	
27	Damián	1	October 5, 2002	Bayamón, Puerto Rico	IWA TV Taping		
28	Stefano	3	November 2, 2002	Bayamón, Puerto Rico	IWA TV Taping		
29	Diabólico	1	November 23, 2002	Carolina, Puerto Rico	IWA TV Taping		
30	Paparazzi	2	February 1, 2003	Bayamón, Puerto Rico	IWA TV Taping		
31	Noriega	1	April 19, 2003	Bayamón, Puerto Rico			
32	Tommy Diablo	2	May 17, 2003	Toa Baja, Puerto Rico	IWA TV Taping		
33	Anarchy	1	August 2, 2003	Carolina, Puerto Rico	IWA TV Taping		
34	Tommy Diablo	3	August 30, 2003	Bayamón, Puerto Rico	IWA TV Taping		
35	Blitz	1	November 1, 2003	Bayamón, Puerto Rico	IWA TV Taping	Defeated Johnny Styles, Paparazzi and Noriega in a Fatal 4-Way Match to become n°1 contender then champion.	
36	Tommy Diablo	4	November 15, 2003	Bayamón, Puerto Rico	IWA TV Taping	Defeated Blitz and Paparazzi in a 3-way match.	
37	Blitz	2	November 29, 2003	Carolina, Puerto Rico	Hardcore Weekend (2003)	Defeated Tommy Diablo and Chris Sabin in a 3-way X match.	
38	Homicide	1	January 4, 2004	Cayey, Puerto Rico			
39	Blitz	3	January 24, 2004?	Cabo Rojo, Puerto Rico			
40	Paparazzi	3	February 14, 2004	Bayamón, Puerto Rico	IWA TV Taping		
41	Super Átomo	1	February 28, 2004	Bayamón, Puerto Rico	IWA TV Taping		
42	Blitz	4	April 3, 2004	Carolina, Puerto Rico	Juicio Final IV (2004)	Defeated Tommy Diablo, Cyrus and Misawa in a Fatal 4-way match.	
43	Tommy Diablo	5	April 17, 2004	Bayamón, Puerto Rico	IWA TV Taping		
44	Pelayito Vazquez	1	September 25, 2004	Bayamón, Puerto Rico	IWA TV Taping	First Puerto Rican referee to hold a professional title. Extreme Rules Match	
45	Tommy Diablo	6	October 15, 2004			Unclear when Tommy Diablo regained the title	
—	Vacated	—	October 30, 2004	Bayamón, Puerto Rico	IWA TV Taping	Tommy Diablo was injured by Apolo so the title was vacated by GM Savio Vega and ordered a Battle Royal.	
46	Golden Boy	1	October 30, 2004	Bayamón, Puerto Rico	IWA TV Taping	Golden Boy won a Battle royal against Blitz, Lash, Enjabonao, Just Perfect, Johnny Styles, Hip, Hop, Rising Bull I y Rising Bull II.	
47	Blitz	5	December 18, 2004	Bayamón, Puerto Rico	Christmas in PR (2004)	Ladder Match.	
48	Super Mark	1	February 27, 2005	Bayamón, Puerto Rico	IWA TV Taping		
49	Tommy Diablo	7	May 21, 2005	Toa Baja, Puerto Rico	IWA TV Taping	No-Time Limit Match	
50	"El Sensacional" Carlitos	1	October 1, 2005	Carolina, Puerto Rico	Golpe de Estado (2005)		
51	Blitz	6	February 4, 2006	Caguas, Puerto Rico	IWA TV Taping		
52	"El Sensacional" Carlitos	2	March 31, 2006	Toa Baja, Puerto Rico	Juicio Final (2006)	Defeated Hiram Tua, Blitz and Tommy Diablo in a fatal 4-way X match.	
53	Blitz	7	April 15, 2006	Caguas, Puerto Rico	Apocalipsis (2006)		
54	Hammett	1	May 6, 2006	Bayamón, Puerto Rico	IWA TV Taping		
55	Blitz	8	May 27, 2006	Aguas Buenas, Puerto Rico	IWA TV Taping		
56	"El Sensacional" Carlitos	3	August 5, 2006	Bayamón, Puerto Rico	IWA TV Taping		
57	Super Mark	2	September 3, 2006	Caguas, Puerto Rico	Golpe de Estado (2006)	Defeated "El Sensacional" Carlitos and Tommy Diablo in a 3-way extreme rules match.	
—	Vacated	—	September 16, 2006	Cayey, Puerto Rico	Noche de Justicia (2006)	Super Mark Defeated "El Sensacional" Carlitos, then said to GM Orlando Toledo that he wanted to leave the Jr Heavyweight division.	
58	"El Enjabonao" Julio Franco	1	October 14, 2006	Caguas, Puerto Rico	Hardcore Weekend (2006)	Won the vacant title in a 15-man battle royal.	
59	Bolo The Red Bulldog	1	November 18, 2006	Carolina, Puerto Rico	Armagedón (2006)		
—	Deactivate	—	November 25, 2006	Levittown, Puerto Rico	Impacto Total	Orlando Toledo announced that the Cruiserweight title would replace the title.	

== Combined reigns ==
Rank	Wrestler	No. of reigns	Combined days
1	Tommy Diablo	7	490
2	Blitz	8	303
3	Super Crazy	3	299
4	Mr. Águila	1	264
5	Stefano	3	194
6	Carlitos	3	169
7	Sean Hill	3	155
8	El Lobo (Andy Anderson)	3	120
9	Paparazzi	3	96
10	Diabólico	1	70
11	Super Mark	2	69
12	Jesus Cristobal	1	63
13	Golden Boy	1	49
14	Super Átomo	1	35
14	"El Enjabonao" Julio Franco	1	35
15	MIKAMI	1	31
16	Damian	1	28
16	Noriega	1	28
16	Anarchy	1	28
16	Brent Dail	1	28
17	Ismael Feliciano	2	27
17	Minoru Fujita	1	27
18	Mike Anthony	1	21
18	Chicano	1	21
18	Hammett	1	21
19	Homicide	1	20
19	Pelayo Vazquez	1	20
20	Andrés Borges	3	19
21	Bolo The Red Bulldog	1	7
22	Juventud Guerrera	1	2
23	Crash Holly	1	<1
