= International Wrestling Association (Puerto Rico) =

Professional wrestling promotion

IWA Puerto Rico
- The logo used by IWA-PR.
- Acronym: I.W.A.
- Founded: 1994; 32 years ago
- Style: Fusion of several (among them technical, aerial and strong style)
- Headquarters: Carolina, Puerto Rico
- Founder(s): Víctor Quiñones; Miguel Perez Jr. Savio Vega
- Owner: Savio Vega
- Website: https://www.iwapuertorico.com/

The International Wrestling Association is a conglomerate of professional wrestling promotions that originated in Puerto Rico and currently operates there. Founded in 1994 by wrestler promoter Víctor Quiñones and wrestler Miguel Perez Jr. it quickly entered an agreement to serve as a development territory for the World Wrestling Federation (now known as WWE) that lasted until 2001. During its first decade, IWA grew to rival the long-standing World Wrestling Council (WWC). Its business model relies on pushing younger talents, using veterans and foreign wrestlers to get them over with the public.

Besides a number of alliances with foreign promotions that included Total Nonstop Action Wrestling, International Wrestling Association of Japan (which Quiñones also co-founded in 1994), IWA Mid-South, and Ring of Honor (ROH), the company was also a member of the National Wrestling Alliance between 2007 and 2008. The original incarnation ceased operations in 2012. On October 24, 2018, the reopening of IWA-PR was also announced.

== History ==
=== IWA (1994) ===
Víctor Quiñones, Miguel Perez Jr and Perez wife made an attempt to start the promotion by doing TV tapings in February 1994 with local and international wrestlers. With no success Víctor Quiñones went to Japan to work on International Wrestling Association of Japan.

=== IWA-WWF (1999–2000) ===
The International Wrestling Association (IWA) had a working agreement with the World Wrestling Federation (WWF) in the first year of operations from 1999 to 2000, with IWA serving as the WWF's developmental territory. During that time some developmental and regular WWF talent often appeared on IWA Puerto Rico shows. That included The Rock's first and only wrestling match in Puerto Rico on April 28, 2000, at Paquito Montaner Stadium in Ponce, Puerto Rico when he teamed with Kane against the Dudley Boyz. During that year IWA began promoting two of their most popular annual events, IWA Christmas in PR and Histeria Boricua. On the second night IWA Christmas in PR Histeria Boricua on January 6, 1999 at "Juan Pachin Vicens Auditorium" on Ponce, Puerto Rico with Kane vs. The Undertaker on the main event drew 15.000 fans, the largest crowd for a wrestling event in Ponce.

=== IWA-PR vs. WWC ===
IWA adopted a strict protocol of expelling problematic fans, such as those that threw objects to the ring. On April 1, 2001, the IWA parodied Jovica's accent and referred to WWC as an independent company with mediocre performers in a segment of El Tocotón. In June 2001, the IWA held a joint show along independent promotion Puerto Rico Wrestling Association. On July 28, 2001, it was published that the promotion had extended the contract of their top stars Ricky Banderas and Apolo for five years plus another additional year of no competing in case of abandoning the promotion. In August 2001, the IWA made efforts to exploit The Invasion angle being featured in WWF by bringing members of the regular roster and The Alliance such as Mike Awesome, Billy Gunn, Justin Credible, Tajiri, Tommy Dreamer, Hugh Morris, Steve Blackman, Hakú, Scotty 2 Hotty or Shawn Stasiak. This was combined with a move to bring Balls Mahoney, another ex-ECW figure to the company. On October 10, 2002, an extension of the contract between IWA and Telemundo was made public. On October 13, 2002, both promotions announced a card to be held on the same date and venue for October 18. Ultimately, IWA presented its event, while WWC did not hold one on that day. In 2003, Savio Vega tried to bring Randy Savage to IWA-PR. In May 2003, the Wrestling Observer reported that Dutch Mantel, the IWA's creative head, had applied for work at WWE and been declined. He responded by expressing that Meltzer was “100% wrong” and that he only had informal conversations with the promotion in the past. In May 2003, Rivera and Eddie Colón encountered each other in a restaurant, entering into an argument about the practices and product of their respective promotions. The IWA turned this into an angle, where they belittled Colón as a “fan” of Armando Gorbea. On May 29, 2003, a copy of a letter that WWC sent to Telemundo in response for its use of the name “TNT” was made public. In June 2003, the IWA began an onscreen storyline where Víctor Quiñones would sell the company to an unnamed buyer in order to expand and begin an internationalization of the brand. This was a tie in to a legitimate expansion, in which the promotion reached an agreement with Sunshine TV, a network based in Florida, to begin the transmission of an English version of their programming. The taped show was named IWA: Total Impact, and was narrated by Dutch Mantell and Mario Savoldi. The program was produced by the latter's filming studios. Prior to Summer Attitude 2003, the promotion contacted several small businesses to sell the tickets from the event, avoiding its regular distributor, Ticket Center. After contracting José Huertas González, the IWA used him to promote their Summer Attitude card in Telemundo's programming, including a variety show named Atrevete.

=== Broadcasting abroad ===
IWA: Total Impact debuted the first week of July, being broadcast by Sunshine Network in Florida and Latin TV in New York. During its initial run, the program was complimented by classic footage from the USWA. The promotion was expected to employ this to create a fan base in the United States, eventually hosting cards in these states. In this show, Rivera was referred to as “The Boss” instead of “Savio Vega” due to copyright claims by WWE. The show was quickly retransmitted in other stations throughout the United States, including WCYB - TV (Bristol, Virginia), KTUD-TV (Las Vegas, Nevada), AIN Cresson (Texas), WBGN-TV (Pittsburgh, Pennsylvania), XCVS-TV (Shreveport, Louisiana), KBBR-TV (Baton Rouge, Louisiana), KBCB-TV (Bellingham, Washington), WRCX-TV (Dayton, Ohio), WVII-TV (Bangor, Maine), WPXT-TV (Portland, Maine), KLDT-TV (Lewisville, Texas), WBQP-TV (Pensacola, Florida), WBII-TV (Ashland, Mississippi), WBGT-TV (Rochester, New York), WYCS-TV (Louisville, Kentucky), WYLE-TV (Sheffield, Alabama), WCOM-TV (Griffin, Georgia), WLOT-TV (New York) and Comcast (Philadelphia, Pennsylvania). At its peak, this internationalization effort grew to include more that 100 channels. On August 27, 2003, it was reported that a series of conversations between the promotion and TNA-NWA were in an advanced stage. The idea was to bring talent from the IWA to perform in the latter's X Division as a promotional stunt to attract Latin American audiences. In September, the promotion created a second show directed to the United States public titled Zona Impactante. Produced by Hector Moyano and Axel Cruz, the show was televised through Telemundo 40 in Orlando and América Azteca in Kissimmee. Several other stations were reportedly interested in the promotion's product. In September, the promotion lost Mantell as booker when he signed with TNA-NWA, despite the loss, both parts parted on good terms. Soon afterwards, these programs were retransmitted locally.

=== Apolo lawsuit ===
The promotion held its first show abroad for October 7, 2003, in the Kissimmee Civic Center in the city of Kissimmee, Florida. During this event, Kein Kelly joined the promotion. After participating in this card, Figueroa decided to stay in that state, being removed from the promotion's storylines. Weeks later, Figueroa made an appearance in a local promotion, No Name Wrestling (NNW) being also scheduled for a subsequent appearance the following month. Figueroa then revealed that he had left the promotion unsatisfied with a situation involving the health of one of his daughters and expected to relocate to Florida permanently. The promotion retaliated by sending a letter to NNW, TNA and WWE, informing them of the wrestler's ongoing contract and that the ring name “Apolo” was registered.

2004 opened with German Figueroa returning to NWA-TNA as part of a talent exchange, but there soon was a setback in the promotion's agreement, which was precipitated by an exclusivity clause that prevented NWA-TNA talent from appearing in an IWA cable PPV. Nonetheless, IWA continued its plans to do the PPV with its own talent and distribute it through both cable and Dish Network. The event's name was changed to “Total Impact” after being taped and prior to its distribution began on March 5, 2004. The event was sold for $19.95 and was rerun on March 6 and 11. During this month, Mantell approached the promotion and offered his services as a consultant, but the approach was declined. Shortly afterwards, Mantell signed with WWC and the promotion's working agreement with NWA-TNA was cancelled, reportedly because of disagreements regarding IWA's incursion in the PPV market. The rivalry between promotions also resulted in occasional confrontations to ensure the availabilityof a venue. On the other hand, the promotion also held friendly relations, and even some degree of working relationships, with local independent promotions such as CWF. The promotion also benefited from its previous ties with WWE, who allowed Val Venis to make a campaign for it due to not possessing any plans for him at the moment. However, it lost its narrator and producer, Hector Meléndez, to NWA-TNA, when Mantell recruited him for the same purpose. Following the death of close collaborator Miguel Aponte, the promotion held a series of special events in his honor. The IWA responded by contacting NWA-TNA and prohibiting the use of contracted wrestler Apolo, while they had a working relationship with WWC.

=== Collaborations ===
On May 15, 2004, it was announced that “El Café del Milenio”, a television segment that originally aired in WWC's Superestrellas de la Lucha Libre, was being brought to IWA's programming. The promotion also held a benefic wheelchair basketball game. On June 20, 2004, one of the promotion's talents, Víctor Rodríguez, died of a heart attack. The promotion then changed all of its schedule to hold a number of homages to the wrestler. From this point onwards, the momentum gained during the year was lost and the assistance was irregular. During the 2004 Summer Olympics, the promotion was forced to change the horary of its programs to accommodate Telemundo's coverage of the event. During the summer of 2004, IWA collaborated with Ring of Honor (ROH) in a talent exchange, where several of the latter's wrestlers came in representation. On September 11, 2004, two of the promotion's talents, Carlos Cotto and Slash Venom, competed in a ROH card. The passing of tropical storm Jeanne over Puerto Rico affected the organization of cards during this month. Besides its ongoing relationship with ROH and the rekindled agreement with NWA-TNA, the IWA also tried to bring professional boxers into the promotion as special referees, unsuccessfully approaching Félix Trinidad and Miguel Cotto (who is the cousin of Carlos Cotto). During this timeframe, the IWA prevented the participation of some of its talents in a card held by independent promotion NWG, deviating from its previous cooperation with independents. For Histeria Boricua 2005, the promotion contacted several international talents, including Abdullah the Butcher and Nidia. After Figueroa wrestled with independent promotion CWF, the IWA threatened the company with legal action. During the offseason, the promotion modified the horary of their shows to accommodate special programming in the channel. Leading to Histeria Boricua 2005, the IWA aired special programming to promote the event. The promotion also repackaged the content of their PPV as a DVD. The IWA also readjusted the days in which secondary wrestlers were used. In February 2005, the promotion held a massive tryout. On March 24, 2005, the IWA rekindled its relationship with WWE, reaching an agreement that would see some developmental talent arrive to the promotion without it being considered a territory itself. Along their previous working relationships with NWA-TNA and ROH, this meant that the promotion had reached accords with all three major North American promotions. Locally IWA and NWS joined forces for the Juicio Final 2005 card. Entering the summer, the IWA began coordinating a show in collaboration with International Gladiators of Wrestling, to be held at the Coliseum of Puerto Rico. As part of its alliance with WWE, Eugene was brought for the Víctor Rodríguez Memorial Cup. In July 2005, it was announced that Shane Sewell would jump from the IWA to NWS. The acquisition of an active maineventer lead to the cancellation of the collaboration between both promotions. The IWA responded by filing a legal complaint over the ownership of a ring, but the case was dismissed. In August 2005, it was reported that WWE had further plans for both IWA and WWC. In August, reports noted that the promotion was having issues running shows in its habitual venue, the José Cestero Court. However, this issue was solved within weeks. During this month, the promotion also faced other difficulties including a lawsuit filed against them by the family of Víctor Rodríguez and losing their narrator, Willie Urbina. On March 18, 2006, independent promotion PWA accused the IWA and NWS of sabotaging one of its cards, with both promotions reflecting the blame.

=== Death of Víctor Quiñones ===
On April 2, 2006, the IWA lost its founder and owner, when Víctor Quiñones suddenly died of a heart attack at the age of 46. The event lead to a series of cross-promotional homages by wrestlers and corporations that knew him, including some that were actively competing with IWA-PR at the moment such as WWC's Rico Suave and several of NWS’ employees. Advertisers and promoters also joined on the condolences. On their part, several wrestlers that began their career at IWA-PR reacted expressing both grief and gratitude. Former employees such as announcer Hugo Savinovich, referee Eliezer Rosado and managers Jorge Casanova and Joe Don Smith reacted the same. Foreign wrestlers such as Fidel Sierra, the Youngbloods, Tahitian Warrior, Angel Mexicano, Bret Sanders and Andy Anderson also made public statements. On April 8, 2006, the IWA held its own homage to Quiñones.

In June 2006, Figueroa appeared in a NWS show despite remaining under contract. The IWA responded with a number of legal actions involving the use of the wrestler and his character. On July 9, 2006, it was reported that the IWA administration and the WWC administration had discussed the possibility of cooperating with each other, even discussing a potential interpromotional angle. During the first week of August, IWA and NWS offshoot World Wrestling Stars (WWS) announced an alliance where both promotions would share cards and cooperate on the television product. Later in the month, the promotion recovered Sewell from NWS and González made his return after a hiatus. After acquiring Joan Guzmán from WWC, the IWA debuted a new section named La Chercha, which aired along IWA classics. In November, the promotion collaborated with independent NWG in a community activity. In December 2006, it was announced that the promotion's programming would air in the western coast of Puerto Rico through WOLE-TV. Parallel to this, Zona Caliente moved to the 3:00 p.m. - 5:00 p.m. slot in Telemundo. During this time, the promotion also emphasized a lack of support from the public during its storylines, making reference to a real decline in assistance. Outside of wrestling, the promotion was involved in visits to hospital where children suffering cancer were treated. In January 2007, the IWA debuted a new television segment hosted by Los Rabiosos. During this month, one of the IWA's talents, John Moxley, performed for WWE Heat. On February 7, 2007, the IWA announced that in March they would be hosting their first cards at Ecuador, also announcing an alliance with local promotion WAR. In March 2007, WWC and Mario Savoldi broke their working relationship, with the IWA capitalizing by bringing in the agent and Billy Kidman and Psychosis, both of which were announced to perform in their rival's cards. On April 7, 2007, Zona Caliente returned to its original 1:00 p.m. slot. On June 2, 2007, independent promotion Puerto Rico Wrestling Alliance (PRWA) accused the IWA of preventing one of its talents from performing there. On June 5, 2007, Miguel Pérez was sued in his role as IWA promoter by DRD, who cited faults to articles IX and XVI of a regulation that had just been approved by the agency. On June 9, 2007, the IWA introduced a new intro for its shows. One of the promotion's wrestlers, Joan Guzmán, became WWS Heavyweight Champion. On June 14, 2007, the IWA joined NWG, WWR and WWS in a card named Junte para la Historia in memorial of deceased wrestler Omar Pérez Barreto. In July, the IWA held an angle where one of its wrestlers would win a WWE contract due to the impending departure of Colossus to Florida Championship Wrestling (FCW).

=== La Rabia, heist of the Universal Championship ===
The final week of the month, the promotion aired a special programming titled Mega Momentos de la IWA. However, the same day WWC contacted several wrestlers with ties to Hector Meléndez and filmed a segment with them concealing their identities. During this time, the NWA also began considering hosting the finals of a tournament to crown the new NWA World Heavyweight Champion in an IWA card, being a finalist along New York and Los Angeles. Faced with losing their talent, IWA reinforced its roster with foreign wrestlers such as Vampiro, Ricky Vega and Vito. Of the performers that left, Cotto returned weeks later. IWA was ultimately selected to host the NWA final, with Bryan Danielson and Adam Pierce being the contenders. However, after the former underwent eye surgery he was replaced by Brent Albright. Afterwards, it was announced that Danielson would be the guest enforcer. In the event titled NWA Weekend held on September 1, 2007, Pierce became the new NWA World Heavyweight Champion. During this timeframe, the promotion made several adjustments such as holding cards every two weeks and firing several talents, including the entire Women's Division, which had been irregularly used for months. In October, the IWA continued downsizing, firing Venom due to unspecified differences. On November 22, 2007, the IWA collaborated with NWG in organizing Thanksgiving Riot. In December 2007, Williams suddenly left his office as IWA booker. On January 11, 2008, IWA announced that Zona Caliente would be airing on Video Max.

On January 5, 2008, WWC announced that Rubysnky had opted to sign with IWA following failed negotiations, in the process revealing both the character that he would take as well as the storyline. All of his teammates at los Templarios left for IWA as well. None of La Rabia members made their scheduled appearances for the first date of the Euphoria tour. Following the absences, it was reported that there had been conversations between the group and IWA during the offseason. On January 6, 2008, Big made a surprise appearance at Histeria Boricua while carrying WWC's Universal heavyweight Championship belt and challenged the IWA World Heavyweight Champion, his former partner Lozada, to an unification match. After he made his initial appearance, WWC's merchandising executive José Roberto Rodríguez entered the building and demanded that the belt was returned, but IWA personnel had taken the belt elsewhere and Salovi confronted him. For the unification, Big carried the Revolution X-Treme wrestling belt that belonged to Rivera and lost the match to Lozada. In an interview with mainstream newspaper Primera Hora, Colón Sr. denied that Big was still champion and warned that they would pursue a case for illegal appropriation if the belt was not immediately returned. The promoter also claimed that Meléndez and La Rabia were aware that they would be fired and decided to do a preemptive strike. For its following program, IWA announced that they would air footage of the event, which was done in an edited fashion. In an NWA Report, the IWA announced that they would retire the old belt and introduce a new one to represent the Undisputed Championship. WWC responded by airing a segment where it boasted putting down La Rabia (which is translated as “The Rabies”) and aired a segment where the commission and insisted that Big was not champion at Histeria Boricua. The same month, IWA announced the acquisition of Cassandra and The Bad Boys from Hell's Kitchen. In February, IWA continued with its roster moves, firing Joan Guzmán and bringing in The Amazing Kong and Jeffreys. However. Weeks later Guzmán was contracted again and La Chercha was included in the programming.

=== Lawsuit against Mario Savoldi ===
On March 22, 2008, reports noted that Mario Savoldi had unilaterally moved the IWA headquarters without informing Pérez or Rivera, who learned of the move when they arrived at their former offices and found them vacant. This division left Telemundo without new programming, with old shows being aired in the meanwhile. Pérez and Rivera retained control of the webpage, the production truck and the ring and the following day they published their account of the events, which they called “a coup against IWA“, claiming that production materials and the film library were moved to a warehouse in the process and that they would take legal action. During this time period, there were doubts that about which part would retain the IWA's name. Despite this, Pérez and Rivera began considering the option of forming a new group and contacted several members of the roster towards this goal. A schism happened within the talents, with Huertas, Los Aéreos, The Naturals, Shane Sewell, Ricky Vega and Toledo siding with Savoldi, most remaining with Pérez and Rivera, and a neutral group led by Ray González and Bison also emerging. Savoldi also made attempts to stop the holding of further cards for the moment. Pérez and Rivera then announced that they would shoot on the situation during the next card. Despite facing serious economic difficulties due to the situation, Pérez and Rivera retained the Telemundo spot and resumed their programming. Meanwhile, Savoldi considered running under the name of International Wrestling Entertainment. On March 29, 2008, the IWA held a card where the conflict was turned into an angle and Rivera was apparently arrested by corrupt cops. On April 6, 2008, IWA announced that the IWA World Heavyweight and Extreme Cruiserweight titles were vacated due to the allegiances of the wrestlers. The following day, Rivera and Pérez won their lawsuit against Savoldi, who was ordered to return the equipment. While new material could be edited, the IWA aired old shows with a current promo. On May 10, 2008, the IWA announced the acquisition of Ricky Vega from Savoldi's group, which had stagnated. In May 2008, the IWA held negotiations with Ramón Álvarez. In June, the IWA announced an acquisition by reviving the “hooded” gimmick, later revealing Joe Bravo.

=== Cobra promotions ===
During this timeframe, promoter Edwin Vázquez Ortega had presence in television and was involved in a number of angles. Referred on screen by the title of “El Promotor”, he was given a role as an authority figure, with power to order matches. Vázquez was given other roles, such as facilitating storylines by getting attacked by Lozada, who disagreed with his actions as promoter. In general, his skits sided him with the heroic, or “face”, characters. For the following months, matches that were “ordered by the promotor” we’re ubiquitous in IWA-PR's cards. He was involved in storylines with Los Dueños de la Malicia and Joe Bravo. Vázquez was involved in the angle for the IWA Undisputed World Heavyweight Championship, stripping Bravo and declaring it vacant. His role in storylines involving Los Dueños de la Malicia, Gilbert and others continued being pervasive in IWA-PR's programming and events.

In July, IWA announced that Savio Vega had been contacted by TNA to work as an agent. On July 31, 2008, IWA announced that Zona Caliente would return in August and be available to the clients of local cable companies.

In August, both WWC and IWA lost talent to a re-branded Extreme Wrestling Organization (EWO), in the case of this promotion it lost both of their announcers, some referees and wrestlers. On August 23, 2008, IWA announced that Impacto Total was returning to its former slot on Telemundo. On September 4, 2009, several IWA talents joined independent performers in a charity card. In October, the promotion cancelled a card citing weather reasons due to the passing of Omar through the region. It also released announcer and commenter Héctor “Voz de Trueno” Meléndez. The new set of rules was enforced in titular matches. In November, IWA announced that they had lost communication with Noriega after reaching an agreement and that he no-showed an event, that part of its talent would wrestle abroad and the integration of Figueroa. For Christmas in PR, Vázquez Ortega made a special offer for tickets preordered at his own business, Cobra Music Center.

For Histeria Boricua 2009, IWA announced that it was making a significant investment in set, which also included bringing TNA talents including the incumbent Legends Champion Booker T and LAX. Greet and meet events were held. At Histeria Boricua, the promotion announced the arrival of Samoa Joe. It also made arrangements to bring back Chet Jablonski. In February, IWA announced the return of Banderas and Sewell.

The promotion was then active in a talent exchange with DWE of the Dominican Republic, but also a localcard. The working agreement between RXW and IWA lead to Panamanian talents appearing in Puerto Rico in March. After IWA announced the return of Sewell to its roster, WWC made arrangements so that he would join them instead. In April, the issues with the television show continued, forcing the IWA to cancel a card. On April 4, 2009, IWA debuted a segment called Malicia TV hosted by Dennis Rivera and Noel Rodríguez. Luke Williams was also featured in the product. During this time, the IWA held an agreement with independent promotion NWG, allowing some of its talents to wrestle there. In May the promotion rearranged the alignments of the wrestlers to compensate for dates outside Puerto Rico and unclear long-term contractual situations. In June the promotion was forced to cancel a card. In June, Vázquez Ortega officially became the IWA's promoter.

=== Tenth anniversary ===
For its anniversary event, IWA brought talent from the TNA Knockouts division. In the lead up to the tenth anniversary event, the IWA booked OBD to a future date despite her scheduled appearance at WWC's Aniversario 2009, airing a promo segment. For the event, the promotion resigned Bryan and Castillo. For its own Tenth Anniversary event, the IWA brought back Banderas and involved him in an angle with Dennis Rivera. A press conference was held prior to the event, which featured meet and greet events with the Beautiful People, Banderas, Bryan and Cotto, among others. On August 7, 2009, the IWA announced the return of Dutch Mantell, who resumed creative functions. The promotion became involved in a number of non-profit events, helping charities and high school classes. Towards this end, they collaborated with other promotions such as Manny's Wrestling authority by loaning their talents. On October 10, 2009, Rivera addressed the crowd informing of an expansion to South American television. The IWA began promoting the future integration of Banderas, Apolo and “two other world champions”. In November, WWC began promoting the “unimaginable”, later revealed to be the debut of Ricky Banderas for the promotion. The arrival marked the latest in a series of attempts to take the wrestler away from the IWA, and served to set a match against Carly Colón to open the 2010 season. In December, reports of an internal restructuration surfaced, including the integration of a new investor. Among these changes, there were issues with the permanency of Mantell, a situation complicated by health issues being faced by Luke Williams. Prior to Christmas in PR, the reinstallation of Vázquez Ortega as promoter was announced. After WWC spoiled that Sewell had left to join to join the IWA and make a surprise appearance at Christmas in PR, they responded by filing a lawsuit prohibiting the use of the character of “Ricky Banderas” and forcing the use of “El Triple Mega Campeón“ as replacement. WWC's own Gorbea refuted the content of the press release, becoming involved in a public dispute with BJ. During the offseason, the promotion loaned talent to be used in the season closer of independent promotion HWR. As the issues with Mantell persisted, the IWA contracted Luis Santiago to perform the role of booker. It also brought in Booker T and Colossus and placed them in a first contender's match. On January 15, 2010, the IWA loaned several talents to a CWF charity card, including the incumbent Undisputed World Heavyweight Champion, Shane Sewell. The promotion then experienced several difficulties, including issues with its program and a cancelled card. In April 2010, IWA announced that Impacto Total was moving to a new time slot, Saturdays from 2 to 4. The company also lost its champion, Shane Sewell, to the PRWA. In June 2010, IWA postponed the José Miguel Pérez Cup due to weather conditions, a situation that also affected its production of Impacto Total. Approaches to Vega by WWC eventually concluded in a skit where he appeared along Carlos Colón in a television show insulting Carlito. This segment was well received, receiving an approval of 64% among polled wrestling fans. IWA emphasized it in its programming, while WWC did not. Ultimately, the angle was abandoned before Aniversario. On its part, the IWA celebrated its 11th anniversary in Summer Attitude. In August 2010, IWA prevented several of its talents from participating in the MMA reality show Fighting for Real, produced by Shane Sewell. The company made several changes to its programming, removing Joe Bravo from his on-screen role as GM and incorporating the commission with more frequency. For Golpe de Estado 2010, IWA featured WWE superstar Daniel Bryan, who wrestled twice against both of the Rivera brothers. Afterwards, the promotion released Joe Bravo and Mostro and added interviewer Keila Huertas to Impacto Total. IWA continued collaborating with NWG. In November 2010, booker Luis Santiago and announcer Frankie Berdecia left IWA.

=== Ricky Banderas lawsuit ===
IWA claimed ownership of the character of “El Mesías” Ricky Banderas, forcing WWC to bill the wrestler as “El Hombre que ellos llaman El Mesías Ricky Banderas” and “El Mega Campeón”. In December 2010, Axel Cruz, Bryan and Eric Escobar returned to IWA. Impacto Total returned to its original slot. As rumors swirled about negotiations with a number of performers, the promotion discarded several in a public statement. The change in slot brought several issues in its implementation during January 2011. The return of Ray González, as Rey Fénix, at Histeria Boricua was well received. IWA was forced to cancel a card. During the final months of 2010 an investor joined IWA, which allowed them to brought in some wrestlers.

Citing “technical problems”, IWA aired Impacto Total online despite claiming that it continued in Telemundo and was working with some “beneficial changes”. The issue persisted in April, while the company “worked things out” with the station. In the meantime, Impacto Total aired on Play TV. Afterwards, IWA released a press statement in which it announced that it would stay in Telemundo. After another program failed to air as scheduled, the promotion revealed that it was trying to continue working with the station, but admitted that if that was the case it would be relegated to Punto Dos. Instead, IWA-PR opted to expand its deal with Play TV by reintroducing Zona Caliente. However, the internal issues of the promotion continued and a card was cancelled without prior notice and lost backstage staff. Another was cancelled citing the weather conditions.

=== La Invasión ===
Days before the celebration of Aniversario 2011, WWC began teasing about an “explosive” storyline. Savio Vega initially denied the implication that he was involved. Instead, as references were made to IWA in Superestrellas de la Lucha Libre, Thunder and Lightning appeared. Vega once again denied that the “invasion” was going on. Despite this, both sides continued in negotiations and ultimately reached an agreement late in the final week, with Vega appearing in Superestrellas de la Lucha Libre. Thunder and Lightning remained the storyline representatives of IWA in WWC. IWA hyped the arrival of WWC wrestlers to Summer Attitude, mentioning Carlito. The angle was well received by the wrestling fans of Puerto Rico. Vega mentioned that both Miguel Pérez and Víctor Jovica opposed to the idea, though he stated that Pérez later warmed up to it. He also confirmed that for the time being its programming was going to continue on Play TV. Four chairs were reserved for IWA the first night of Aniversario 2011, with Thunder and Lightning hinting that they were not alone. The main night of Aniversario, Los Fujitivos wrestled Thunder and Lightning to a no contest in a match were two referees, representing WWC and IWA, counted at the same time. Afterwards, Savio Vega accompanied by a host of IWA wrestlers including Dennis Rivera, Noel Rodiguez, Spectro, Hiram Tua and Carlos Cotto attacked them. He insulted Shane Sewell, Mr. Big and Blitz due to their association with WWC at the moment and insulted Carlito. At IWA Summer Attitude, Gilbert interrupted an homage to Víctor Quiñones, prompting a confrontation with Savio Vega. He was backed by WWC wrestlers Díaz, Los Rabiosos, Los Fujitivos and Shane Sewell. The invading team was repelled by the IWA-PR roster, but accepted a challenge issued by Vega. WWC recorded the intervention. Impacto Total continued moving slots at Play TV. On his part, WWC aired footage of its wrestlers at Summer Attitude. Colón answered the insults thrown at him by Savio Vega in Superestrellas de la Lucha Libre. The collaboration was cancelled when both promotions failed to reach an economic agreement. Another card was cancelled due to a tropical storm. IWA cancelled Golpe de Estado. Despite the failure of the collaboration, Los Dueños de la Malicia appeared in Superestrellas and challenged Los Fujitivos for the WWC World Tag Team Championship. At Septiembre Negro they won the match, immediately leaving the venue afterwards. WWC used the commission as a plot device to declare the titles held up, reaffirming the posture later in Superestrellas de la Lucha Libre. Despite refusing to return the belts to WWC, when interviewed by mainstream media outlet NotiCel Los Dueños de la Malicia assured that they “had not stolen anything” and were the legitimate champions per the rules of professional wrestling. The report also noted that the actions that followed the event were not part of a storyline. WWC later changed the official result of the match through the commissioners, declaring it null and declared that Los Fujitivos remained champions. IWA moved its programming to Mega TV. More issues emerged when it went off air, with IWA uploading its shows to YouTube. In December, they announced the return of the show to MegaTV. To open 2012, IWA postponed Histeria Boricua. Savio Vega reappeared in WWC, challenging Carlito both in Superestrellas de la Lucha Libre and Euphoria. Afterwards, Carlito answered.

=== Foreign use of the brand ===
Since at least May 19, 2011, independent Mexican wrestler Exorcista had made the claim of being the "IWA Puerto Rico Champion" in social media, being billed as such in appearances throughout the summer, wearing an unlicensed belt (with a sideplate globe design similar to that of the IWA World Tag Team Championship's centerplate) to sell the ruse. On August 5, 2011, Mexico City-based independent promotion Lucha Libre Mexicana del Sureste teased the participation of the purported "IWA World Heavyweight" and CMLL World Middleweight within the promotion. For its first defense that took place two days later, the name of the bootleg title was amended to the fictional "IWA World Lightweight Championship", although it was still promoted as a heavyweight championship afterwards. For another appearance that took place on September 17, 2011, LLMS used the IWA's actual logo to promote the card. On October 12, 2012, former Undisputed World Heavyweight Champion Enrique "Ricky" Cruz denounced that the brand had been appropriated in a message to his followers in Mexico (where he performed for International Wrestling Revolution Group), since a backstory had been created for the "IWA Lightweight Championship" where Exorcista had won it from him.

On November 10, 2011, promoter José E. Mateo launched an independent offshoot named IWA Florida with the approval of Savio Vega, basing it in the city of Orlando in the eponymous American state where a significant portion of the Puerto Rican diaspora is located. Although the company's actual name was Independent Wrestling Association, it used the same logo as IWA Puerto Rico due to their inter-promotional affiliation. During its run (2011–2012), Vega also performed as part of the roster.

=== Recess, interpromotional events and bankruptcy (2011–2012) ===
In ate 2011 the company took a recess to restructure the company and return a few months later in 2012 and make inter-promotional shows with WWC and EWO, but the administration confronted economic problems and announced that it would enter another recess. IWA continued an interpromotional angle with EWO for months, which eventually led to title unifications. In June 2012, IWA announced the postponement and later cancellation of Juicio Final. IWA main figure Savio Vega then started working for WWC as wrestler and occasional booker.

=== World Wrestling League (2014–2017) ===
When the World Wrestling League (WWL) shifted its focus from international tours to more home events in 2014, it acquired several locals including Savio Vega and Dennis Rivera. An invasion by IWA talents began at the 2015 International Cup, where Vega made his intentions of taking over and renaming the promotion clear. However, two days after the event owner Richard Negrín announced that the promotion was shutting down as part of a public diatribe, entering a period of inactivity that lasted until June and aborting the angle. Vega was brought back in March 2016, beginning another angle that hinted at his intentions of taking over WWL and relaunching IWA, which included having an edition of WWL High Voltage replaced with Impacto Total.

In July 2016, with the angle still unfinished, Negrín entered another sabbatical citing health issues and Vega acquired the promotion. WWL retained its acronym and initially served as a spiritual successor to the IWA, first using flashbacks of his work as General Manager to place him in a similar role as president and then resuming and concluding an unfinished storyline from 2006. The year was concluded with the revival of Christmas in PR, in which the downfall of the IWA was used as a plot element. In May 2017, Golpe de Estado was also reintroduced, with the backlash of Vega's long history of authority abuse dating back to the IWA as the main storyline behind a coup d'état by long running booker Héctor "MoodyJack" Meléndez, in which both him and Dennis Rivera were ousted from the company.

=== Team IWA's invasion of WWL (2018) ===
The redesigned logo used by Team IWA in the WWL.

The passing of hurricane Maria over Puerto Rico forced WWL into an eight-month hiatus, with Juicio Final being revived to serve as its return show. In the event, Vega and Rivera made their return along Noel Rodríguez and announced themselves as Team Savio/IWA (later completed by Richard Rondón and Roxy Tirado). WWL president Manny Ferno opposed them in representation of WWL, along the stable known as Puros Machos that he led. When the promotion for Golpe de Estado 2018 began, the brand was formally reintroduced with the unveiling of a new logo and the reintroduction of several titles. The event featured the first confrontation between factions, with Team Manny/WWL emerging victorious and preventing the name change in the first attempt. However, the storyline continued with Ferno intending to "destroy" the legacy of the brand after "breaking the man" and grew to include Shane Sewell and Slash Venom, in representation of IWA.

Former Impacto Total/Zona Caliente narrator Axel Cruz was brought in to join WWL's High Voltage team, while the segment El Tocotón also made a comeback led by Stefano. A rematch was pushed, while emphasis was placed on the fact that Team Savio had only one of the wrestlers that headlined the IWA during its peak (himself) and that one of the members (Roxy Tirado) had never been part of the promotion. IWA picked two straight wins over WWL at Summer Blast (later being joined by Jesús Castillo Jr.) and War in the West, with a returning Apolo being approached by Vega and a disappointed Mr. Big by Ferno. The storyline, however, was written off following a skit where the leader of Puro Macho supposedly ordered an "accident" on his counterpart.

On July 20, 2018, a relaunch of IWA Florida was announced, this time with the inclusion of narrator Willie Urbina to the staff. Additionally, a tournament to fill the vacancies for the Undisputed World Heavyweight and World Tag Team Championships was scheduled. This initiative ultimately led to Savio Vega leaving WWL, of which he was a minority owner, to focus on the first card to be held under the brand in more than six years.

=== Corporate revival (2018–2019) ===
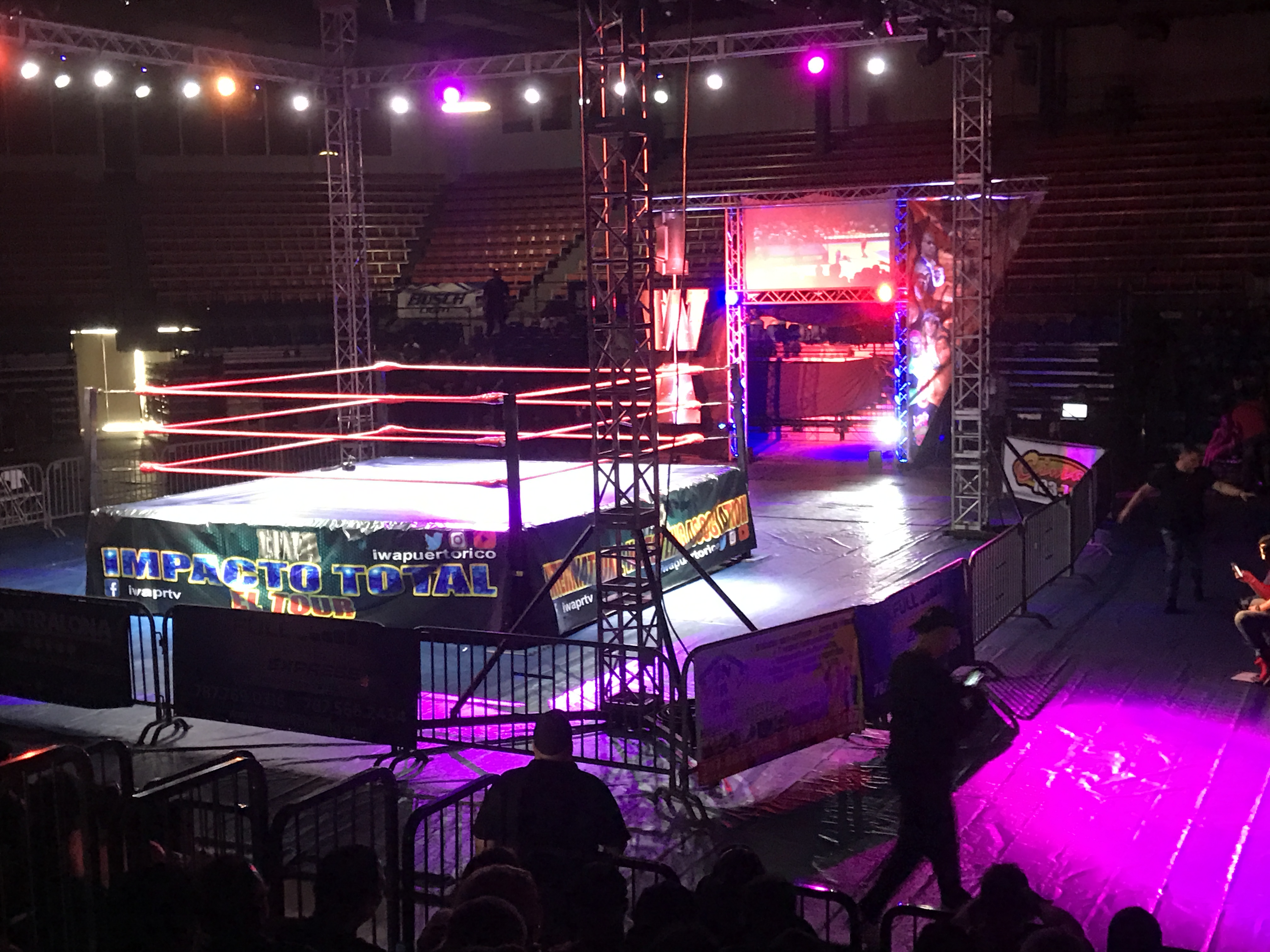
The staging used by IWA-PR in 2019, as seen prior to the start of the final event of its return tour.

On October 24, 2018, Savio Vega announced the return of the original incarnation of the International Wrestling Association in Puerto Rico, with its return show scheduled for 2019. This followed the reactivation of its official accounts earlier that week. On the other hand, IWA-FL held its first set of tapings on October 27, 2018. In November, the spinoff announced that it would host Histeria Boricua in 2019, in a revelation that also featured the debut of longtime rival headliner Carly Colón under the brand.

On November 29, 2018, Vega announced that the first series to be held by IWA-PR, Impacto Total: El Tour, which was scheduled for January. The IWA also reached agreements with several other local promotions (including WWC and Champion Wrestling Association, which had replaced EWO as the largest independent in the scene in the years since) for the use of classic roster talents that had moved on during the hiatus. To close the book on WWL, Puro Macho was brought in and featured in a confrontation against Vega, Sewell, Apolo and Dennis Rivera over the angle that had been dropped months before. As part of its relaunch, IWA-PR became involved with charity events. Savinovich was brought back, promoting the event in the media. In June 2019, IWA announced the return of flagship show Impacto Total, which would stream on the internet. However, the promotion cancelled Summer Attitude and rescheduled for Golpe de Estado.

=== Alliances with WWC and MLW; UPLL (2020–2021) ===
On February 13, 2020, a video where Ray González extended an invitation to Savio Vega to attend a WWC to present him with a proposal that would be mutually beneficial was posted in the IWA-PR's social media platforms. After some anticipation, the summon was accepted in a subsequent segment aired in Superestrellas de la Lucha Libre. On February 15, 2020, Vega accepted a copy of the document from González and informed that he would give his final answer at the IWA-PR event Histeria Boricua 2020. During this skit, the heel faction known as Dynasty (composed by Eddie Colón, Gilbert and Peter John Ramos) where placed in antagonism to the agreement. The COVID-19 pandemic pauses the progression of the storyline, but both promotions passively helped each other by sharing their weekly shows.

After Savio Vega's arrival to Major League Wrestling (MLW) in June 2019, a de facto collaboration between both promotions began, with the emergence of angles involving the IWA Caribbean Heavyweight Championship and Salina de la Renta. In addition, the eventual arrival of MLW World Heavyweight Champion Jacob Fatu and Josef Samael (collectively known as Contra Unit) to IWA-PR was announced prior to the global outbreak, this as part of a collaboration with PCW Ultra.

In July 2020, the creation of a regional alliance known as the Unión Panamericana de Lucha Libre (lit. “Pan American Union of Professional Wrestling”) was announced, with IWA-PR joining Society Action Wrestling (SAW-WAG) of Colombia, Súper Lucha Panamá of Panama, ARENA Fight: El Renacer Maya of Nicaragua and Renegados Lucha of Costa Rica as founding members.

In October 2020, IWA-PR's association with MLW evolved into a formal strategic alliance for the “celebration of inter-promotional events, direct support to the events of each of the companies and collaboration in other types of promotions”. It was later incorporated into a storyline between Vega and Salina de la Renta over the acquisition by a shady entity known as Azteca Underground.

=== IWE Takeover IWA (2021–2022) ===
In 2021, IWA began holding cards in bubble format, also televising the pre-recorded Histeria Boricua through MEGA-TV. To close the summer of 2021, IWA aired its iPPV La Gran Amenaza. A rise in COVID-19 cases due to variants and government restrictions forced IWA to postpone Histeria Boricua and then film the event without fans and air on iPPV. The promotion made its return card on March. In mid, end of 2021 Fernando Tonos Alongside of Many Ferno revived the International Wrestling Entertainment (IWE), Tonos says he get a percentage of control on IWA and after the group won all the IWA Championships they rename it and claim as part of IWE rename it all as IWA/IWE.

In Juicio Final the company IWA announce they were going to crown new champions (New IWA World Heavyweight, New IWA Intercontinental Champion & New IWA Tag Team Champions) after the event the company got 2 champions in all divisions except for the Caribbean Championship. (As part of IWE takeover IWA angle) In an attempt to break a world record for oldest champion in professional wrestling, IWA booked Huertas to defeat Ferno for the World Heavyweight Championship at Juicio Final.

Throughout 2022, Epico Colón’s Latin American Wrestling Entertainment (LAWE) was IWA-PR’s direct competition, temporarily displacing WWC in ticket sales and successful events. The sudden folding of this promotion allowed others to pick wrestlers that were previously contracted. IWA-PR secured LAWE World Heavyweight Champion Pedro Portillo III, who began appearing masked and carrying the belt inside a black pouch, as Noriega had done with the WWC Universal Heavyweight Championship in 2008.

== Annual events ==
- Histeria Boricua
- Noche de Campeones
- Jucio Final
- José Miguel Pérez Memorial Cup
- Summer Attitude
- Armagedon
- Golpe De Estado
- Halloween Mayhem
- Hardcore Weekend
- IWA Christmas in PR

== Championships ==
=== Current championships ===
Championship	Current champion(s)	Date won	Event
IWA World Championship	El Dragón Nihan	August 8, 2026	Summer Attitude
IWA Intercontinental Championship	Pedro Portillo iii	October 17, 2026	Golpe de Estado
IWA World Tag Team Championship	Jon Dave Rose & Joe Anthony	October 17, 2026	Golpe de Estado
IWA Puerto Rico Championship	Salazar de la Muerte	September 5, 2026	Conflicto Letal
IWA Women's World Championship	La Brava Escobar	October 17, 2026	Golpe de Estado

=== Other accolades ===
Championship	Current champion(s)	Date won	Event
Chicky Starr Cup	Aiden Grimm	July 31, 2021	La Gran Amenaza
IWA Medal Champion	Mr Big	June 2, 2022	IWA Impacto Total

=== Defunct and inactive championships ===
Championship	Notes
IWA Hardcore Championship	On October 4, 2008, it was assimilated into the Puerto Rico Heavyweight Championship along the Cruiserweight Championship.
IWA World Junior Heavyweight Championship	Retired on November 25, 2006, by general manager Orlando Toledo. It was replaced by the Cruiserweight Championship.
IWA Cruiserweight Championship	On October 4, 2008, it was assimilated into the Puerto Rico Heavyweight Championship along the Hardcore Championship. On July 18, 2009, it was reactivated by itself as the IWA Extreme Combat Division Championship. During this timeframe, the rules that applied to it were changed to be more loose. The original name was restored on March 5, 2011. However, three months later it was reintroduced as the Television Championship. During its final reign, the belt was unofficially known as the IWA Yoú Tu Championship.
IWA Puerto Rico Heavyweight Championship (Original)	Established in 2008. On February 26, 2011, it was unified with the Caribbean Heavyweight Championship (now known as the IWA Puerto Rico Championship). This condition prevailed until it was retired on August 7, 2011.

== See also ==
- Professional wrestling in Puerto Rico
- List of professional wrestling promotions
- International Wrestling Association of Japan
- IWA Mid-South
