= IWA Histeria Boricua =

Histeria Boricua
- IWA Histeria Boricua logo
- Promotions: IWA
- Nicknames: "La noche donde se sintio la verdadera Euforia" (2008)
- First event: Histeria Boricua 2000
- Event gimmick: Season opener

IWA Histeria Boricua is an annual event that has been produced by the International Wrestling Association (IWA-PR) and other members of its conglomerate as a season opening event. It has been historically held during the first weeks of January, regularly coinciding with the celebration of Epiphany.

== WWF/IWA Histeria Boricua 1999 ==
The 1999 event was held on two locations: On January 5, 1999 at "Héctor Solá Bezares Coliseum" in Caguas, Puerto Rico, and On January 6, 1999 at "Juan Pachin Vicens Auditorium" on Ponce, Puerto Rico

WWF/IWA Histeria Boricua - Caguas (1999)
No.	Results	Stipulations
1	Dick Togo & Taka Michinoku defeated Pablo Márquez & Julio Sanchez	Tag team match
2	Mark Henry defeated Foreign Exchange	Singles match
3	Max Mini defeated El Torito	"Minis" Singles match
4	Jose Estrada Jr defeated Julio Ramirez	Singles match
5	Val Venis defeated D'Lo Brown	Singles Match
6	Miguel Perez defeated Billy Gunn	Singles Match

WWF/IWA Histeria Boricua - Ponce (1999)
No.	Results	Stipulations
1	Dick Togo vs. Jose Estrada Jr. ended in an unknown manner	Singles Match
2	Pablo Márquez vs. Taka Michinoku ended in an unknown manner	Singles Match
3	Mascarita Sagrada vs. El Torito ended in an unknown manner	"Minis" Singles Match
4	D’Lo Brown vs. Foreign Exchange ended in an unknown manner	Singles Match
5	Mark Henry vs. Val Venis ended in an unknown manner	Singles Match
6	Billy Gunn and Road Dogg vs. Miguel Pérez Jr. and Huracán Castillo ended in an unknown manner	Tag Team Match (with Savio Vega as Special Referee)
7	Kane vs. The Undertaker ended in an unknown manner	Singles Match

== WWF/IWA Histeria Boricua 2000 ==
Histeria Boricua
- Promotion: International Wrestling Association
- Date: January 7, 2000
- City: Bayamón, Puerto Rico
- Venue: Rubén Rodríguez Coliseum

The 2000 event was held on two locations: On January 6, 2000 at "Palacio de Recreación y Deportes" in Mayaguez, Puerto Rico and On January 7, 2000 at "Ruben Rodriguez Coliseum" in Bayamón, Puerto Rico.

WWF/IWA Histeria Boricua - Mayaguez (2000)
No.	Results	Stipulations
1	Val Venis (c) defeated Miguel Perez Jr. by disqualification	Singles Match for WWF European Championship
2	Ricky Banderas defeated Gangrel (w/ Luna Vachon)	Singles match
3	Los Boricuas (Huracan Castillo & Savio Vega) defeated Rastaman & Fidel Sierra	Tag Team Match
(c) / – the champion(s) heading into the match

WWF/IWA Histeria Boricua - Bayamon (2000)
No.	Results	Stipulations
1	Luna Vachon defeated Sumie Sakai	Singles match
2	Max Mini defeated El Torito	Singles match
3	Kai En Tai (Taka Michinoku and Funaki) defeated Pepe Prado and Andy Anderson	Tag Team Match
4	The Headbangers (Mosh & Thrasher) defeated Miguel Perez Jr & Nuevo Gran Apolo	IWA World Tag Team Championship Tournament First Round
5	D-Generation X (X-Pac and Billy Gunn) defeated D'Lo Brown	Handicap Match
6	Val Venis and Ricky Santana defeated The Headbangers (Mosh & Thrasher) and Savio Vega and Huracan Castillo	Three Way Tag Team Match for the inaugural IWA World Tag Team Championship

== Histeria Boricua 2001 ==
Histeria Boricua 2001
- Promotion: International Wrestling Association
- Date: January 6, 2001
- City: Caguas, Puerto Rico
- Venue: Hector Sola Besarez Coliseum

The 2001 event was held on three locations: On January 5, 2001 at "Acropolis de Manati" in Manati, Puerto Rico, On January 6, 2001 at "Héctor Solá Bezares Coliseum" in Caguas, Puerto Rico, On January 7, 2001 at "Roque Nido Coliseum" in Guayama, Puerto Rico.

No.	Results	Stipulations
1	Max Mini defeated El Torito	Singles match
2	SOS (Andy Anderson and Vyzago) (c) defeated Sexy Sensual (Shawn Hill and Andres Borges)	Tag Team Match for the IWA World Tag Team Championship
3	Huracan Castillo (c) defeated Apolo and Ricky Banderas	Three Way Match for the IWA Hardcore Championship
4	Miguel Perez defeated Ricky Banderas by DQ	Singles match
5	Glamour Boy Shane and Savio Vega defeated Chicky Starr and Victor The Bodyguard by DQ when Dutch Mantel interfered	Tag Team Match
(c) / – the champion(s) heading into the match

== Histeria Boricua 2002 ==
Histeria Boricua 2002
- Promotion: International Wrestling Association
- Date: January 6, 2002
- City: Bayamón, Puerto Rico
- Venue: Pepin Cestero Court

The 2002 event was held on three (announced) locations: On January 4, 2002 at "Acropolis de Manati" in Manati, Puerto Rico, On January 5, 2002 at "Héctor Solá Bezares Coliseum" in Caguas, Puerto Rico and On January 6, 2002 in Bayamón, Puerto Rico.

IWA Histeria Boricua - Manati (2002)
No.	Results	Stipulations
1	Diabolico defeated Agente Bruno	Singles Match
2	Huracan Castillo defeated Fujita	Singles Match
3	Tommy Diablo defeated Chicano	Singles Match
4	Pulgarcito & Luke Williams defeated Paparazzi & Eric Alexander	Tag Team Match
5	Andy Anderson defeated Dragon Makabe by disqualification	Singles Match
6	Max Mini defeated Octagoncito II	"Minis" Singles Match
7	Apolo defeated Victor The Bodyguard	Singles Match
8	Shane the Glamour Boy vs Brian Lee ended in a No Contest	Singles Match

IWA Histeria Boricua - Bayamón (2002)

No.	Results	Stipulations
1	Minoru Fujita defeated Andy Anderson (c) when Dragon Makabe interfered	Singles match for the IWA World Junior Heavyweight Championship
2	Shane the Glamour Boy and Ricky Banderas vs. The Starr Corporation (Chicky Starr and Victor The Bodyguard) ended in a No Contest	Tag Team Match
3	Apolo (c) defeated Brian Lee	Singles match for the IWA World Heavyweight Championship
(c) / – the champion(s) heading into the match

== Histeria Boricua 2003 ==
The 2003 event was held at four locations: On January 3, 2003 in Yauco, Puerto Rico, On January 4, 2003 in Cayey, Puerto Rico, On January 5, 2003 in Mayaguez, Puerto Rico and On January 6, 2003 in Carolina, Puerto Rico.

IWA Histeria Boricua - Yauco (2003)
No.	Results	Stipulations
1	Justin Sane defeated Diabolico	Singles Match
2	Stefano & Espectrito defeated Anarchy & Max Mini	Mixed Tag Team Match
3	Chicano defeated Enrique Cruz	Singles Match
4	Huracán Castillo defeated Flash Venom	Extreme Rules Match
5	Miguel Pérez & Abyss (with Angel) defeated Andy Anderson & Victor The Bodyguard (with Habana)	Tag Team Match
6	Shane The Glamour Boy defeated Rey Fenix	Lumberjack Match
7	Apolo defeated Jeff Jarrett	Stipulations Match

IWA Histeria Boricua - Cayey (2003)
No.	Results	Stipulations
1	El Paparazzi defeated Damián	Singles Match
2	Diabólico defeated Stefano	Singles Match
3	Anarchy defeated Justin Sane	Singles Match
4	Mini Man defeated Espectrito	Singles Match
5	Miguel Pérez (with Ángel) defeated Huracan Castillo	Singles Match
6	Eric Alexander & Andy Anderson vs. Abyss y Slash Venom (with Ángel) ended in a time limit draw	Tag Team Match
7	Ricky Banderas defeated Victor The Bodyguard	"Lucha de Riña" Rules Match
8	Apolo & Shane The Glamour Boy defeated Rey Fénix & Jeff Jarrett (with Savio Vega)	Tag Team Match

IWA Histeria Boricua - Mayaguez (2003)
#	Results	Stipulations
1	Justin Sane & El Paparazzi defeated El Diabolico & Damian	Tag Team Match
2	Mini Max & Anarchy defeated Chicano & Espectrito	Mixed Tag Team Match
3	Huracan Castillo defeated Slash Venom	Singles Match
4	Abyss defeated Eric Alexander	Singles Match
5	Ricky Banderas defeated Victor the Bodyguard by Disqualification	Singles Match
6	Rey Fenix defeated Shane the Glamour Boy	Singles Match
7	Apolo defeated Jeff Jarrett	Two out of Three Falls Match

IWA Histeria Boricua - Carolina (2003)
#	Results	Stipulations
1	El Paparazzi defeated Enrique Cruz	Singles Match
2	Stefano & Chicano (with El Paparazzi) defeated Diabólico & Noriega	Tag Team Match
3	Anarchy & Max Mini defeated Justin Sane & Espectrito	Mixed Tag Team Match
4	Abyss & Miguel Pérez (c) (with Angel) defeated Eric Alexander & Andy Anderson	Tag Team Match for the IWA World Tag Team Championship
5	Huracan Castillo defeated Slash Venom & Tojo Sensei	Triple Threat Hardcore Match
6	Victor The Bodyguard defeated Rey Fenix (with Savio Vega & Avbriela)	Singles Match
7	Shane the Glamour Boy (c) defeated Jeff Jarrett	Singles Match for the IWA Intercontinental Championship
8	Ricky Banderas defeated Apolo (c)	Singles Match for the IWA World Heavyweight Championship

== Histeria Boricua 2004 ==
The 2004 event was held On January 4, 2004 in Mayaguez, Puerto Rico, On January 5. 2004 in Cayey, Puerto Rico, On January 6, 2004 at "Ruben Rodriguez Coliseum" in Bayamón, Puerto Rico. The event in Bayamon was released on DVD which was one of the few events released on DVD by IWA

IWA Histeria Boricua - Mayaguez (2004)
#	Results	Stipulations
1	Eric Alexander defeated Spectro	Singles Match
2	Tommy Diablo defeated Johny Styles	Singles Match
3	Stefano & Max Mini defeated El Paparazzi & El Torito	Mixed Tag Team Match
4	Blitz (c) defeated Súper Átomo and Homicide	Triple Threat "X Rules" Ladder Match for the IWA World Junior Heavyweight Championship
5	Slash Venom defeated Chicano	Extreme Rules Match
6	Los Boricuas (Miguel Pérez & Huracán Castillo) (c) defeated Los Hijos de la Oscuridad (Ricky Banderas & Vampiro)	Tag Team Match for the IWA World Tag Team Championship
7	Shane the Glamour Boy defeated Abyss (with Habana) by DQ	Singles Match
8	Ray Gonzalez, Thunder and Lightning defeated Humongous, Victor the Bodyguard and Chet "The Jet" Jablonski	Six Man Tag Team Match

IWA Histeria Boricua - Cayey (2004)
#	Results	Stipulations
1	Super Atomo & Eric Alexander defeated Tommy Diablo & Paparazzi	Tag Team Match
2	Max Mini defeated El Torito	"Minis" Match
3	Homicide defeated Blitz	Singles Match
4	Chet "The Jet" Jablonski & Victor The Bodyguard defeated Stefano & Chicano	Tag Team Match
5	Humongous (with Fernando Tonos) defeated Ray Gonzalez	Singles Match
6	Ricky Banderas defeated Abyss (with Habana)	Singles Match
7	Vampiro & La Artilleria Pesada (Thunder & Lightning) (with El Profe) defeated Slash Venom & Los Boricuas (Miguel Perez & Huracan Castillo)	Six Man Tag Team Match
8	Shane the Glamour Boy (c) defeated Apolo	Singles Match for the IWA World Heavyweight Championship

IWA Histeria Boricua - Bayamon (2004)
#	Results	Stipulations
1	Eric Alexander defeated El Espectro and Johnny Styles	Triple Threat Elimination Match
2	Super Atomo & Max Mini defeated El Paparazzi & El Torito	Mixed Tag Team Match
3	Blitz (c) defeated Homicide and Tommy Diablo	Extreme Rules Match for the IWA World Junior Heavyweight Championship
4	Los Ilegales (Chicano & Stefano) defeated Los Boricuas (Miguel Perez Jr. & Huracan Castillo Jr.) (c) (with Fernando Tonos)	Tag Team Match for the IWA World Tag Team Championship
5	Humongous (with Fernando Tonos) defeated Shane the Glamour Boy (c)	Singles Match for the IWA World Heavyweight Championship
6	Thunder & Lightning (with El Profe) defeated Victor The Bodyguard and Chet "The Jet" Jablonski	Tag Team Match
7	Los Hijos de la Oscuridad (Ricky Banderas and Vampiro) defeated Slash Venom and Apolo	"Jaula de la Muerte" Rules Cage Match
8	Ray Gonzalez defeated Abyss (with Habana) by DQ	Singles Match
(c) – refers to the champion(s) heading into the match

== Histeria Boricua 2005 ==
The 2005 event was held at four locations: On January 6, 2005 at "Roberto Clemente Coliseum" in San Juan, Puerto Rico, On January 7, 2005 at "San Sebastian Coliseum" in San Sebastian, Puerto Rico, On January 8 at "Cayey Coliseum" in Cayey, Puerto Rico and On January 9, 2005 at "San German Coliseum" in San German, Puerto Rico

IWA Histeria Boricua - San Juan (2005)
#	Results	Stipulations
1	Stefano and Golden Boy defeated Blitz and Joe Don Smith	Tag Team Match
2	Nidia and Spectro defeated La Tigresa and Anarchy	Mixed Tag Team Match
3	Billy Gunn defeated Vampiro	Singles Match
4	The Tonga Kid defeated Ray Gonzalez by disqualification	Singles Match
5	Thunder and Lightning (c) defeated Konnan and Ron Killings	Tag Team Match for the IWA World Tag Team Championship
6	Miguel Pérez defeated Kasey James	Singles Match
7	Hangman Hughes and Brody Steele defeated Chicano and Slash Venom	Tag Team Match
8	Rikishi pinned Bison Smith	Singles Match
9	Shane the Glamour Boy (c) defeated Ricky Banderas	Singles Match for the IWA World Heavyweight Championship
(c) – refers to the champion(s) heading into the match

IWA Histeria Boricua - San Sebastián (2005)
#	Results	Stipulations
1	Spectro defeated Anarchy	Singles Match
2	Nidia defeated La Tigresa	Singles Match
3	Miguel Pérez defeated Kasey James	Boot on a Pole Match
4	Dr. César Vargas & Livewire defeated Just Perfect & Joe Don Smith	Extreme Rules Tag Team Match
5	Ray Gonzalez & Lightning defeated Konnan and Ron Killings	Tag Team Match
6	Shane the Glamour Boy defeated Chicano	Singles Match
7	Vampiro & Rikishi defeated Billy Gunn & Hangman Hughes.	Tag Team Match
8	“El Mesías” Ricky Banderas (c) defeated “El Bufalo” Bison	Hardcore Match for the IWA Hardcore Championship
(c) – refers to the champion(s) heading into the match

IWA Histeria Boricua - Cayey (2005)
#	Results	Stipulations
1	Golden Boy defeated Just Perfect.	Singles Match
2	Nidia and Stefano defeated La Tigresa and Blitz	Mixed Tag Team Match
3	Black Pearl defeated Chicano by Forfeit (Injury)	Singles Match
4	Vampiro, Konnan & Ron Killings defeated “Badd Ass” Billy Gunn, Lightning & Anarchy.	Six Man Tag Team Match
5	Ray González defeated Tonga Kidd.	Singles Match
6	Shane the Glamour Boy defeared Slash Venom	Singles Match
7	“El Bufalo” Bison & Kasey James defeated Rikishi & Miguel Pérez	Tag Team Match
8	Ricky Banderas defeated Hangman Hughes	"Lucha de Riña" Match

IWA Histeria Boricua - San Germán (2005)
#	Results	Stipulations
1	Golden Boy & Stefano sobre Just Perfect & Blitz	Tag Team Match
2	Tigresa defeated Nidia	Singles Match
3	Miguel Perez defeated Kasey James	Kendo Stick on a Pole Match
4	Shane the Glamour Boy defeated Spectro	Singles Match
5	Hangman Hughes defeated Vampiro	Singles Match
6	Konnan & Ron Killings defeated Lightning & Anarchy	Tag Team Match
7	Ricky Banderas defeated Billy Gunn	Singles Match
8	Rikishi & Tonga Kidd defeated Ray Gonzalez & “El Bufalo” Bison by Countout	Tag Team Match

== Histeria Boricua 2006 ==
The 2006 event was held On January 6, 2006 in Toa Baja, Puerto Rico, On January 7, 2006 at "Cayey Coliseum" in Cayey, Puerto Rico, and On January 8, 2006 at "Palacio de Recreacion y Deportes" in Mayaguez, Puerto Rico and other one (presumed) location.

IWA Histeria Boricua - Toa Baja (2006)
#	Results	Stipulations
1	Carlitos & Hiram Tua defeated Tommy Diablo & Blitz	Tag Team Match
2	Noriega (c) defeated Mr. Big	Singles Match for the IWA Intercontinental Heavyweight Championship
3	Cyber Viking defeated Golden Boy	Singles Match
4	La Artilleria Pesada (Thunder & Lightning) defeated Neo & Montana (c)	Tag Team Match for the IWA World Tag Team Championship
5	Rhyno defeated Apolo	Singles Match
6	Slash Venom defeated New Jack	Hardcore Match
7	Konnan and Ron Killings beat La Cruz del Diablo (Diabolico and Cruzz) by DQ	Tag Team Match
8	Chicano defeated Invader I	Singles Match
9	Ricky Banderas defeated Vampiro	Casket Match
10	Ray Gonzalez defeated Savio Vega	Loser Leaves Town Match

IWA Histeria Boricua - Cayey (2006)
#	Results	Stipulations
1	Hiram Tua defeated Johnny Styles	Singles Match
2	Golden Boy defeated Montana (with Neo)	Singles Match
3	Cyber Viking defeated Super Mark	Singles Match
4	La Tigresa & Blitz defeated Amazona & Carlitos	Mixed Tag Team Match
5	Chicano defeated New Jack	Extreme Rules Match
6	Savio Vega & Apolo defeated Ray Gonzalez & Noriega	Street Fight
7	La Artilleria Pesada (Thunder & Lightning) defeated Slash Venom & Mr. Big	Tag Team Match
8	La Cruz del Diablo (Ricky Banderas, Cruzz & Diabolico) defeated Vampiro, Konnan & Ron Killings	Six-Man Tag Team Match

IWA Histeria Boricua - Mayaguez (2006)
#	Results	Stipulations
1	Noriega & Golden Boy defeated Tommy Diablo y Diabolico	Tag Team Match
2	Just Perfect & Tigresa defeated Paparazzi & Amazona	Mixed Tag Team Match
3	Blitz defeated Carlitos	Singles Match
4	Cyber Viking defeated Pablo Marques	Singles Match
5	Slash Venom defeated New Jack	Asian Death Match
6	Konnan & Ron Killings defeated Mr. Big & Montana	Tag Team Match
7	Vampiro, Thunder & Lighting defeated Spectro, Cruzz & Ricky Banderas	Six Man Elimination Tag Team Match
8	Apolo defeated Ray Gonzalez	Singles Match
9	Invader I defeated Savio Vega	No Ring Match

== Histeria Boricua 2007 ==
The 2007 event was held at four locations: On January 4, 2007 at "Residencial Torres de Sabana" in Carolina, Puerto Rico, On January 5, 2007 at "Jose "Buga" Abreu Coliseum" in Isabela, Puerto Rico, On January 6, 2007 at "Ydelfonso Sola Morales Stadium" in Caguas, Puerto Rico and on January 7, 2007 at "Levittown Coliseum" in Levittown, Puerto Rico

IWA Histeria Boricua - Carolina (2007)
#	Results	Stipulations
1	Barbie Boy defeated Rey Andino	Singles Match
2	Tommy Diablo defeated Adam Mayhem	Singles Match
3	"El Sensacional" Carlitos defeated Bolo The Red Bulldog	Singles Match
4	Cruzz & Black Rose defeated El Diabolico & La Morena	Mixed Tag Team Match
5	El Diamante Dominicano defeated Angel	Singles Match
6	Lightning defeated Bison Smith	Singles Match
7	La Zona Ilegal (Chicano & Jumpin' Jeff Jeffrey) defeated Los Rabiosos (Mr. Big & Blitz)	Tag Team Match
8	Shane the Glamour Boy defeated Mikael Judas	Singles Match

IWA Histeria Boricua - Isabela (2007)
#	Results	Stipulations
1	Amazona & Tommy Diablo defeated Blitz & Barbie Boy	Mixed Tag Team Match
2	Angel (c) defeated Bolo The Red Bulldog, "El Sensacional" Carlitos and Hiram Tua	Fatal Four-way Elimination Match for the IWA Hardcore Championship
3	Cruzz defeated Bull Bronsky	Singles Match
4	Jumpin' Jeff Jeffrey & Black Rose defeated El Diamante & La Morena	Banana Challenge Match, Losers were forced to eat "Guineos" Bananas
5	"El Buffalo" Bison defeated Mikael Judas by disqualification	Singles Match
6	Mr. Big defeated Chicano (c)	Singles Match for the IWA Intercontinental Championship
7	Los Hermanos en Dolor (Ricky Banderas & Shane The Glamour Boy) defeated Ray Gonzalez & Lightning	Tag Team Match
(c) – refers to the champion(s) heading into the match

IWA Histeria Boricua - Caguas (2007)
#	Results	Stipulations
1	"El Sensacional" Carlitos, Angel and Hiram Tua defeated Ravishing Ricardo, Bolo The Red Bulldog and Barbie Boy	Six Man Tag Team Match
2	Joe Bravo defeated Bull Bronsky	Singles Match
3	Blitz (c) defeated Super Mark	Singles Match for the IWA Extreme Cruiserweight Championship
4	Cruzz defeated Diabolico	Warrior's Way Match
5	"El Bufalo" Bison defeated Lightning	Singles Match
6	Mr. Big defeated Spectro	Singles Match
7	Ricky Banderas defeated Mikael Judas	Singles Match
8	La Revolucion Dominicana (El Diamante, El Bacano & El Diabolico) (c) (with La Morena) defeated Cruzz & Jumpin' Jeff Jeffrey (with Chicano)	Tables, Ladders & Chairs Match for the IWA World Tag Team Championship
9	Shane the Glamour Boy (c) defeated Ray Gonzalez	Singles Match for the IWA World Heavyweight Championship
(c) – refers to the champion(s) heading into the match

IWA Histeria Boricua - Levittown (2007)
#	Results	Stipulations
1	Barbie Boy defeated Black Rose	Singles Match
2	Spectro defeated Bull Bronsky	Singles Match
3	Super Mark & Anarchy defeated Mr. Big & Blitz	Tag Team Match
4	Angel (c) defeated Tommy Diablo, "El Sensacional" Carlitos and Hiram Tua	Fatal Four-way Hardcore Match for the IWA Hardcore Championship
5	La Revolucion Dominicana (El Diamante, El Bacano & El Diabolico) (with La Morena) defeated Cruzz & Jumpin' Jeff Jeffrey (with Chicano)	Handicap Match
6	Mikael Judas (with Orlando Toledo) defeated "El Bufalo" Bison	Singles Match
7	Los Hermanos en Dolor (Shane the Glamour Boy & Ricky Banderas) defeated Lightning & Ray Gonzalez	Tag Team Match

== Histeria Boricua 2008 ==
The 2008 event was held at three locations: On January 4, 2008 at "Dr. Pedro Albisu Campos Coliseum" in Yabucoa, Puerto Rico, On January 5, 2008 at "Raul Pipote Oliveras Coliseum" in Yauco, Puerto Rico, On January 6, 2008 at "Jose "Pepin" Cestero Court" in Bayamon, Puerto Rico.

IWA Histeria Boricua - Bayamon (2008)
#	Results	Stipulations
1	Romeo defeated Erick Scorpion	Singles Match
2	"La Bestia Infernal" Damian defeated Onix	Singles Match
3	Little Tatoo defeated Kato	Minis Match
4	Los Templarios (Rick Stanley & William De La Vega) defeated La Nueva Generación (Adam Mayhem & Brandom)	Tag Team Match
5	Blitz (c) (with Invader #1) defeated Tim Arson (with Orlando Toledo)	Singles Match for the IWA World Heavyweight Championship
6	Bolo The Red Bulldog (c) defeated Abbad	Hardcore Match for the IWA Hardcore Championship
7	Ricky Vega defeated Shane the Glamour Boy	Singles Match
8	Richard Rondon defeated Chicano, Dennis Rivera, Diamante and Bacano	Singles Match for the IWA Intercontinental Championship
9	Blitz (IWA World Heavyweight Championship) defeated Biggie Size (Capitol Heavyweight Championship) to unify both titles.	Singles Match for the IWA World Heavyweight Championship and the Capitol Heavyweight Championship
10	"The Naturals" (Chase Stevens & Andy Douglas) (c) (with Orlando Toledo) (IWA World Tag Team Championship) defeated "Los Aereos" (Hiram Tua & Carlitos) (Hairs)	Tag Team Match for the IWA World Tag Team Championship
11	"Los Autenticos" (Savio Vega & Miguel Perez) vs Ray Gonzalez & El Leon Apolo went to a "No-Contest"	Tag Team Match
(c) – refers to the champion(s) heading into the match

== Histeria Boricua 2009 ==
The 2009 event was held on January 6, 2009 at "Jose "Pepin" Cestero Court" in Bayamon, Puerto Rico

IWA Histeria Boricua - 2009
#	Results	Stipulations
1	Rick Stanley defeated Niche, Balbuena, Onix, Shaka el Trukero, Atomo, Joseph RPM, Jay Adonis, Barbie Boy and Raymond Sales	Histeria Boricua Rumble to determine 1st contender to IWA Puerto Rico Heavyweight Championship
2	El Diabólico (Puerto Rico) defeated El Bacano (Dominican Republic)	Flag Match
3	Ravishing Richard (c) defeated Chris Joel by disqualification	Singles Match for the IWA Puerto Rico Heavyweight Championship
4	Amazona (c) defeated Barbie Boy	Singles Match for the IWA Women's Championship
7	Joe Bravo (c) defeated Cruzz	Singles Match for the IWA Intercontinental Championship
6	Savio Vega (c) defeated The Sheik (with Imam Ali)	"Globo de la Muerte" Rules match for the RXW Panama World Championship
8	Bison Smith & Miguel Pérez defeated ‘La Amenaza Árabe’ (c) (Zaer Arafat & Hardan Kadafi)	Tag Team Match for the IWA World Tag Team Championship
9	‘Los Dueños de la Malicia’ (Dennis Rivera & Noel Rodríguez) defeated ‘LAX’ (Homicide & Hernández) (with José Mateo)	Tag Team Match
10	Chicano (c) defeated Booker T	Singles Match for the IWA Undisputed World Heavyweight Championship
(c) – refers to the champion(s) heading into the match

== Histeria Boricua 2010 ==
The 2010 event was held on January 6, 2010 at "Jose "Pepin" Cestero Court" in Bayamon, Puerto Rico and a special event called "Histeria Boricua – La Revancha" On January 9, 2010 at "La Puntilla Court" in Cataño, Puerto Rico.

IWA Histeria Boricua - 2010
#	Results	Stipulations
1	Empio defeated Lash, Átomo, Vértigo, Julian Jamrock, Mike Picono, Enigma and Dimes	Histeria Boricua Rumble for the IWA Extreme Cruiserweight Division Championship
2	Dennis Rivera defeated Kahagas	Singles Match for the IWA Intercontinental Championship
3	“Doble R” (Richard Rondon & Romeo) defeated “Los Árabes” (Hardam Kadafi & Zaer Arafat) (c) and “Los Dueños de la Malicia” (Rick Stanley & Noel Rodríguez)	TLC Triple Threat Tag Team Match for the IWA World Tag Team Championship
4	The Kongs (with Savio Vega) defeated Kid Diamond & Justin Dream	Open Challenge Tag Team Match
5	Shane the Glamour Boy defeated Joe Bravo	Singles Match for the IWA World Heavyweight Championship
6	El Gigante Colossus (with Savio Vega) defeated Booker T by disqualification	Singles Match to determine 1st contender to the IWA Undisputed World Heavyweight Championship
7	“La Cruz del Diablo” (Cruzz & Diabólico) defeated Savio Vega & Gilbert	Texas Tornado Match
(c) – refers to the champion(s) heading into the match

IWA Histeria Boricua "La Revancha" - 2010
#	Results	Stipulations
1	Empio defeated Starky Balbuena	Singles Match
2	Átomo defeated Julian Jamrock	XCD Challenge
3	The Kongs (with Savio Vega) defeated Tuff Dog & Blade	Open Challenge Tag Team Match
4	Dennis Rivera vs Bacano ends in a “No Contest” (with Joe Bravo as Special Referee)	Singles Match for the IWA Intercontinental Championship
5	Savio Vega & Gilbert defeated El Diabólico & Ricky Cruzz	Tag Team Match
6	“Doble R” (Romeo & Richard Rondon) (c) defeated Noel Rodríguez & Bolo The Red Bulldog	Tag Team Match for the IWA World Tag Team Championship
7	Shane the Glamour Boy defeated El Gigante Colossus (with Savio Vega)	No Disqualification Singles Match for the IWA Undisputed World Heavyweight Championship
(c) – refers to the champion(s) heading into the match

== Histeria Boricua 2011 ==
Histeria Boricua 2011
- Promotion: International Wrestling Association
- Date: January 6, 2011
- City: Bayamón, Puerto Rico
- Venue: Cancha José “Pepín” Cestero

The 2011 event was held on January 6, 2011 at "Jose "Pepin" Cestero Court" in Bayamon, Puerto Rico

IWA Histeria Boricua - 2011
#	Results	Stipulations
1	Havoc (c) defeated Jamrock	Singles Match for the IWA Extreme Cruiserweight Division Championship
2	Cruzz defeated El Renegado del Infierno	5 Minute Challenge
3	"La Amenaza" Bryan defeated Cruzz	Singles Match
4	Shockwave the Robot defeated Samuel Adams	Singles Match
5	Xix Xavant (c) defeated Damian	Singles Match for the IWA Caribbean Heavyweight Championship
6	Átomo y Sónico (c) defeated The Academy (Jamal & Phillips)	Tag Team Match for the IWA World Tag Team Championship
7	Noel Rodríguez (c) defeated Hiram Tua	Singles Match for the IWA Puerto Rico Heavyweight Championship
8	Chris Angel (c) defeated Savio Vega	Cage Match for the IWA Intercontinental Championship
9	Escobar defeated Dennis Rivera (c)	Singles Match for the IWA Undisputed World Heavyweight Championship
(c) – refers to the champion(s) heading into the match

== IWA-FL Histeria Boricua 2019 ==
Histeria Boricua 2019
- Promotion: International Wrestling Association Florida
- Date: January 12, 2019
- City: Orlando, Florida
- Venue: IWA Florida Arena

As IWA-PR prepared to relaunch, anglo spinoff International Wrestling Association Florida (IWA-FL) announced that it would host Histeria Boricua this year. The event included the debut of Carly Colón under the IWA brand.

== Histeria Boricua 2020 ==
Histeria Boricua 2020
- Promotion: International Wrestling Association
- Date: March 7, 2020
- City: Humacao, Puerto Rico
- Venue: Coliseo Emilio E. Huyke

The event was held at Coliseo Emilio E. Huyke in Humacao, Puerto Rico, Puerto Rico on March 7, 2020.

IWA Histeria Boricua - 2020
#	Results	Stipulations
1	Real OB vs. Noel Rodríguez	Singles Match
2	Aiden Grimm vs. Jax	Bounty Singles Match
3	The Drunken Xpress (Pupe Jackson and Excellent Mantell) vs. Joe Bravo and Alejandro Diosdado	Tag Team Match
4	Los Fujitivos (Alejandro Marrero and Wilfredo Rivera) defeated Puro Macho (JC Navarro and Khriz Díaz) (c)	Tag Team Match for the IWA World Tag Team Championship
5	Thunder & Lightning vs. Manny Ferno and Legio (Spectro and Vassago)	Two on Three Match
6	Manny Ferno defeated Electro (c)	Singles Match for the IWA Intercontinental Championship
7	Mr. Big (c) defeated Monster Pain	Everything Goes Match for the IWA World Heavyweight Championship. Pain entered the match as self-proclaimed World Heavyweight Champion after stealing the belt at Christmas in PR 2019.
(c) – refers to the champion(s) heading into the match

== Histeria Boricua 2024 ==
Histeria Boricua 2024
- Promotion: International Wrestling Association
- Date: January 6, 2024
- City: Juncos, Puerto Rico
- Venue: Coliseo Rafael G. Amalbert

The 2024 was held at Rafael G. Amalbert Coliseum in Juncos, Puerto Rico, on January 6, 2024.

IWA Histeria Boricua - 2026
#	Results	Stipulations
1	2Hot4U (Cesar Aldea & Edrax) defeat Doom Patrol (Cold & Death Warrant)	Tag Team Match
2	Controversial Inc. (Mr. C & Salazar) defeat Drunken Express (Excellent Mantel & Pupe Jackson) by DQ	IWA Florida Tag Team Title Tournament Match
3	Danny Limelight (c) defeats Azazel	UWN World Title Match
4	Evie De La Rosa & Labrava Escobar defeat Nathalya Perez & Roxxy	Tag Team Match
5	La Industria (El Cuervo & Justin Cotto) (c) defeat Faces Of Destiny (Jay Blake & Khriz Diaz)	IWA Puerto Rico Tag Team Title Match
6	Nick Mercer defeats Leinor White	No Disqualification Match
7	Mike Mendoza (c) vs. Niche - Double DQ	IWA Puerto Rico Heavyweight Title Match
8	John Hawking, Manny Ferno & Miguel Perez Jr. vs. Joe Bravo, Pedro Portillo III & Romeo - No Contest	IWA Puerto Rico Intercontinental Title Miguel Perez Jr. Career On The Line Match
(c) – refers to the champion(s) heading into the match

== Histeria Boricua 2026 ==
The 2026 event was held on January 10, 2026 at "Roberto Clemente Coliseum" in San Juan, Puerto Rico

Histeria Boricua 2026
- Promotion: International Wrestling Association
- Date: January 10, 2026
- City: San Juan, Puerto Rico
- Venue: Roberto Clemente Coliseum

IWA Histeria Boricua - 2026
#	Results	Stipulations
1	Barbie Boy, Doctor Lucha & Pimpinela Escarlata defeat Carlos Controversia, Damian & El Wizard	Six Man Tag Team Match
2	Roxxy & Vanilla Vargas (c) defeat Atillah & Bitterness	IWA Puerto Rico Women's Tag Team Title Matchh
3	Edrax Torres & Mascara Pura (c) defeat Drunken Express (Excellent Mantel & Pupe Jackson)	IWA Puerto Rico Tag Team Title Match
4	Daisy Lyn (c) defeats Evie De La Rosa	IWA Women's World Title Match
5	Pedro Portillo III (c) defeats Niche	IWA Puerto Rico Title Match
6	Atomo & Super Atomo defeat Manu & Pedro Portillo III	Tag Team Match
7	Dragon Nihan defeats Mike Mendoza	Singles Match
8	Jay Blake (c) defeats Ricky Banderas	IWA Puerto Rico Undisputed World Heavyweight Title Match
(c) – refers to the champion(s) heading into the match

== See also ==
- Professional wrestling in Puerto Rico
- List of professional wrestling promotions
