= IWA World Tag Team Championship =

Professional wrestling tag team championship

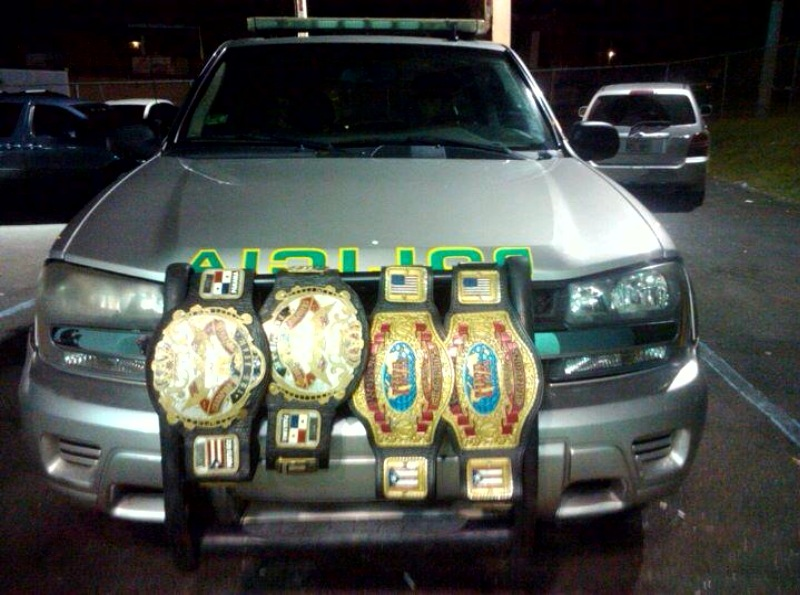
- The Unified Puerto Rico Tag Team Championship as held by Dennis Rivera and Noel Rodríguez; the WWC World Tag Team Championship belts (left) and IWA World Tag Team Championship belts (right).

Details
- Promotion: International Wrestling Association
- Date established: January 6, 2000
- Current champion: Jon Dave Rose & Joe Anthony
- Date won: October 17, 2026

Other names
- IWA World Tag Team Championship (2000-2012, 2019-present) *IWE World Tag Team Championship (2022, during the IWA/IWE title dispute storyline) *IWA Undisputed World Tag Team Championship (also used in addition as referenced in IWA's website since the November 19, 2022 IWA/IWE title Unification)
Statistics
- First champions: Val Venis and Ricky Santana
- Most reigns: (As a tag team) Los Boricuas (7 reigns), Thunder & Lightning (7 reigns) (As individual) Miguel Perez (14 reigns)
- Longest reign: Los Fugitivos (Niche & Lynx) (511 days)
- Shortest reign: Eric Alexander and Craven (1 hour)

The IWA World Tag Team Championship is a Tag Team Championship defended in Puerto Rico.The titles were first introduced in the first incarnation of the International Wrestling Association, where they are defended. They also made a brief appearance in the World Wrestling League (WWL) during 2018. It was introduced on January 6, 2000.

In 2021, Fernando Tonos and Manny Ferno created La Alianza IWE with the intention of completing a hostile takeover on behalf of International Wrestling Entertainment. Members of the stable won all of the IWA-PR titles. In response, general manager Chicky Starr and Savio Vega introduced parallel titles for each division in March 2022. While the storyline continued, there two sets of belts were contested independently of each other, with the originals being referenced to as the "IWE World Tag Team Championship".

== History ==
In early 2015, while Vega was part of La Radio PR's "Más Allá del Ring" show, the title belts made appearances as part of the studio's decore along the Undisputed World Heavyweight and Intercontinental Championships

On May 19, 2018 it was reintroduced by Savio Vega as part of the main angle of WWL Golpe de Estado 2018, in which he led a group that intended to convert the WWL into the second incarnation of the IWA. At the event, Los Dueños de la Malicia carried the titles with them. However, after Golpe de Estado Dennis Rivera announced his retirement due to a legitimate knee injury. The titles made an appearance in an event sponsored by the municipal administration of Naranjito afterwards, but their status was not touched upon.

On July 20, 2018, a relaunch of IWA's Florida spinoff was also announced, along a tournament to fill the vacancies for the Undisputed World Heavyweight and World Tag Team Championships. However, with the relaunch of the IWA's main branch at Puerto Rico, the spinoff received its own titles.

In November 2019, one of the belts was carried by JC Navarro at Caution Wrestling Federation’s Aniversario event in Mexico. He did the same at Colombian Pro Wrestling’s Indy Circuit event, held on December 14, 2019.

=== Revival (2019) ===
After IWA-PR resumed operations in 2018, a tournament to fill the vacancy was announced on February 22, 2019 as part of Revelaciones. The participating teams were West Side Mafia, Thunder & Lightning, Legio and The Drunken Xpress. The eliminatories were set to begin at Sangre x Sangre in March. The first two teams clashed prior to its start, with Thunder and Lightning securing a first-round bye with a win over the West Side Mafia.

== Tournament ==
Sangre x Sangre

(03/30 Cataño)

Vendetta

(04/06 Dorado)

Promised Land

(05/18 Mayaguez)

1
Puro Macho

(Kris Diaz and JC Navarro)

W

8
Los Boricuas

(Miguel Pérez Jr. and Huracan Castillo.)

Puro Macho

(Kris Diaz and JC Navarro)

W

West Side Mafia

(Morgan and Tabu)

4
West Side Mafia

(Morgan and Tabu)

W

5
The Drunken Express

(Excellent Mantell and Pupe Jackson)

Puro Macho

(Kris Diaz and JC Navarro)

W

Legio

(Spectro and Vassago)

2
Legio

(Spectro and Vassago)

BYE

7

Legio

(Spectro and Vassago)

W

La Artilleria Pesada

(Thunder and Lightning)

3
La Artilleria Pesada

(Thunder and Lightning)

BYE

6

== Title history ==
=== Reigns ===
Indicates disputed IWA/IWE champions.
Indicates title reigns and changes not recognized by IWA or vacancies.

Highlights in bold denotes after Juicio Final 2022 each division have 2 champions due by the controversy between IWA and IWE, in which the latter took control of the old titles forcing IWA to create new titles in each division

#	Wrestler:	Times:	Date:	Days held	Place:	Event:	Notes:	Ref.
1	Val Venis and Ricky Santana	1	January 6, 2000	56	Bayamón, Puerto Rico	Histeria Boricua (2000)	Defeated the Head Bangers and Huracán Castillo Jr. and Savio Vega in a three way dance tournament final.	
2	Ricky Santana ^{(2)} and Sean Hill	1	March 2, 2000	36	Carolina, Puerto Rico		Hill replaced Venis due to an injury.	
3	Los Boricuas (Huracan Castillo ^{(1)} and Miguel Perez ^{(1)})	1	March 9, 2000	50	Carolina, Puerto Rico	Impacto Total	Made a team with Savio Vega to defeat Ricky Santana, Sean Hill and Fidel Sierra in a six man tag team match.	
4	Starr Corporation (Chicky Starr ^{(1)} and Victor The Bodyguard ^{(1)})	1	April 28, 2000	9	Ponce, Puerto Rico	IWA One Night Only	Huracan and Miguel were part of Stable "Los Intocables" at this time. Savio Vega was the special referee.	
5	La Nueva Generación (Ricky Banderas and Gran Apolo)	1	May 7, 2000	27	Moca, Puerto Rico			
6	Club WWF (Andy Anderson ^{(1)} and Steve Bradley ^{(1)})	1	June 3, 2000	1	Ponce, Puerto Rico			
7	Andy Anderson ^{(2)} and Headhunter II	1	June 4, 2000	7			Headhunter II replaced Steve Bradley when was called by WWE.	
8	Club WWF (Andy Anderson ^{(3)} and Steve Bradley ^{(2)})	2	June 11, 2000	5			Bradley returned from WWF and regained the Tag Team Championship	
9	La Nueva Generación (Ricky Banderas ^{(2)} and Gran Apolo ^{(2)})	2	June 16, 2000	1	Aguas Buenas, Puerto Rico		This was a 4-way match also including The Starr Corporation (Chicky Starr and Victor The Bodyguard) and Sexy and Sensual (Sean Hill and Andrés Borges) in 4-way match.	
10	Club WWF (Andy Anderson ^{(4)} and Steve Bradley ^{(3)})	3	June 17, 2000	20	Humacao, Puerto Rico			
11	Starr Corporation (Chicky Starr ^{(2)} and Victor The Bodyguard ^{(2)})	2	July 7, 2000	22	Manati, Puerto Rico			
—	Vacated	—	July 29, 2000		Levittown, Puerto Rico		Title was vacated after a match between La Nueva Generación and Starr Corporation.	
12	La Nueva Generación (Ricky Banderas ^{(3)} and Gran Apolo ^{(3)})	3	August 5, 2000	1	Levittown, Puerto Rico	Impacto Total	Ricky Banderas named a new partner, Miguelito Pérez, on August 6 after he turned on Nuevo Gran Apolo.	
13	Los Intocables (Ricky Banderas ^{(4)} and Huracán Castillo ^{(2)} and Miguel Pérez ^{(2)} and Fidel Sierra ^{(1)} and Pain ^{(1)})	1	August 6, 2000	55			On August 13 any combination of Los Intocables were qualified to defend the titles and later Fidel Sierra was added on August 20, 2000 in Lares, Puerto Rico (but Sierra was no longer with IWA).	
14	Starr Corporation (Chicky Starr ^{(3)} and Victor The Bodyguard ^{(3)})	3	September 30, 2000	42	Levittown, Puerto Rico		Defeated Pain and Miguel Pérez, Jr.	
15	SOS (Andy Anderson ^{(5)} and Vyzago ^{(1)})	1	November 11, 2000	105	Levittown, Puerto Rico			
16	Miguel Pérez Jr. ^{(3)} and Gran Apolo ^{(4)}	1	February 24, 2001	25	Bayamón, Puerto Rico		Stipulation was that if Perez and Apolo lost they couldn't be a team anymore.	
17	Starr Corporation (Chicky Starr ^{(4)} and Victor The Bodyguard ^{(4)})	4	March 23, 2001	65	Arecibo, Puerto Rico		Defeated Nuevo Gran Apolo in a handicap match when Miguel Pérez no showed.	
18	D'Lo Brown ^{(1)} and Glamour Boy Shane ^{(1)}	1	May 27, 2001	27	Cataño, Puerto Rico	Impacto Total	Defeated Los Boricuas (Miguel Perez and Huracan Castillo) and Starr Corporation in a 3-way match.	
19	Los Boricuas (Miguel Pérez, Jr. ^{(4)} and Huracán Castillo, Jr. ^{(3)})	3	June 23, 2001	49	Bayamón, Puerto Rico	Impacto Total	Defeated Pete Gas and Chaz and Shane and D-Lo Brown in a 3-way match.	
20	The New Corporation (Big Ross McCollough and Tiger Ali Singh)	1	August 11, 2001	21	Levittown, Puerto Rico	IWA TV Taping		
21	The New Corporation (Faraón Zaruxx and Agente Bruno)	1	September 1, 2001	89	Gurabo, Puerto Rico		They wrestled Tiger Ali Singh and Big Russ McCollough on a tag team match but since they were all member of the NEW CORPORATION, they faked the match. Then Savio ordered the match to be a Title match adding Los Boricuas. At the end Russ was knocked out and then Castillo hit Zaruxx with the bell, Zaruxx landed over Russ and Castillo came to pin both. Savio ruled that since Zaruxx was pinning Russ, Zaruxx and Bruno won the Tag Team Titles.	
22	Los Boricuas (Miguel Pérez, Jr. ^{(5)} and Huracán Castillo, Jr. ^{(4)})	4	September 29, 2001	56	Bayamón, Puerto Rico			
23	The New Corporation (Pain ^{(2)} and Tiger Ali Singh ^{(2)})	1	November 24, 2001	14	Bayamón, Puerto Rico	IWA TV Taping		
24	The New Corporation (Pain ^{(3)} and "Primetime" Ángel Rodríguez) ^{(1)}	1	December 8, 2001	0	Orocovis, Puerto Rico		"Primetime" Ángel Rodríguez replaced Tiger Ali Singh.	
25	Starr Corporation (Chicky Starr ^{(5)} and Victor The Bodyguard ^{(5)})	5	December 8, 2001	118	Orocovis, Puerto Rico			
26	Hermanos del Dolor (Glamour Boy Shane ^{(2)} and Ricky Banderas ^{(5)})	1	April 5, 2002	8	Manatí, Puerto Rico			
27	Starr Corporation (Chicky Starr ^{(6)} and Victor The Bodyguard ^{(6)})	6	April 13, 2002	99	Bayamón, Puerto Rico		Shane no showed under a deportation stipulation (in reality he was headed to Japan).	
28	Los Boricuas (Miguel Pérez, Jr. ^{(6)} and Huracán Castillo, Jr. ^{(5)})	5	July 21, 2002	91	Levittown, Puerto Rico	IWA TV Taping		
29	Los Boricuas Auténticos (Savio Vega and Miguel Pérez ^{(7)})	1	October 20, 2002	78	Juana Diaz, Puerto Rico		Miguel Pérez defeated Huracán Castillo in a No DQ match to win control of the tag team titles at the Antonio Barcelo Coliseum on September 21, 2002 at Toa Baja, PR. later Pérez picked Savio Vega to be his new tag team partner.	
30	Abyss and Miguel Pérez ^{(8)}	1	January 6, 2003	13	Carolina, Puerto Rico	Histeria Boricua (2003)	Abyss replaced Savio Vega.	
31	Eric Alexander and Andy Anderson ^{(6)}	1	January 19, 2003	55	Levittown, Puerto Rico	IWA TV Taping		
—	Vacated	—	March 15, 2003	Bayamón, Puerto Rico		Savio Vega stripped the IWA Tag Team Titles after Eric Alexander failure to defend the title for 30 days due to his injury.		
32	Abyss ^{(2)} and Miguel Pérez ^{(9)}	2	March 15, 2003	63	Bayamón, Puerto Rico		Title returned back by the IWA general manager Savio Vega.	
33	Glamour Boy Shane ^{(3)} and Abyss ^{(3)}	1	May 17, 2003	14	Toa Baja, Puerto Rico	IWA TV Taping	In a match between former tag team partners, Abyss (1/2 of the Tag Team of the promotion) defeated Miguel Perez (1/2 of the tag team) to win the total control of the title, after Shane interfered. Abyss handed him the other belt, so new tag team champions were Shane and Abyss.	
34	Los Desertores (Miguel Pérez, Jr. ^{(10)} and Slash Venom)	1	May 31, 2003	28	Bayamón, Puerto Rico			
35	Eric Alexander ^{(2)} and Craven	1	June 28, 2003	7	Humacao, Puerto Rico			
—	Vacated	—	July 5, 2003			After the match between Miguel Pérez, Jr. and Slash Venom and Eric Alexander and Craven.		
36	Eric Alexander ^{(3)} and Craven ^{(2)}	2	July 12, 2003	154	San Juan, Puerto Rico	Summer Attitude (2003)	Defeated Miguel Pérez, Jr. and Slash Venom in a rematch.	
37	Chicano and Craven ^{(3)}	1	December 13, 2003	1			Chicano replaced Eric Alexander.	
38	Los Boricuas (Miguel Pérez, Jr. ^{(11)} and Huracán Castillo, Jr. ^{(6)})	6	December 14, 2003	23	Bayamón, Puerto Rico	Christmas in PR (2003)	Defeated Craven and Chicano and Power Company (Dave Power and Dean Power) in a 3-way match.	
39	Los Ilegales (Stefano and Chicano ^{(2)})	1	January 6, 2004	18	Bayamón, Puerto Rico	Histeria Boricua (2004)		
40	Los Boricuas (Miguel Pérez, Jr. ^{(12)} and Huracán Castillo, Jr. ^{(7)})	7	January 24, 2004	28	Cabo Rojo, Puerto Rico	IWA TV Taping	Chicano was injured so Stefano had to be in a Handicap Match against Los Boricuas. On 02/07 Caguas. PR Victor and Chet stole the titles proclaiming themselves champions	
41	Artillería Pesada (Thunder and Lightning)	1	February 21, 2004	119	Caguas, Puerto Rico	IWA TV Taping	Defeated La Compañía (Victor the Bodyguard and Chet Jablonski), Los Ilegales (Chicano and Stefano) and Los Boricuas (Miguel Perez, Jr. and Huracan Castillo) in a 3-way Elimination match.	
42	Glamour Boy Shane ^{(4)} and Kasey James	1	June 19, 2004	6	Bayamón, Puerto Rico	IWA TV Taping		
43	Artillería Pesada (Thunder ^{(2)} and Lightning ^{(2)})	2	June 25, 2004	92	Bayamón, Puerto Rico			
44	Slash Venom ^{(2)} and Chicano ^{(3)}	1	September 25, 2004	21	Bayamón, Puerto Rico	IWA TV Taping	Defeated La Artillería Pesada in a cage match.	
45	Chet Jablonski and Kasey James ^{(2)}	1	October 16, 2004	35	Bayamón, Puerto Rico	Golpe de Estado (2004)		
46	Slash Venom ^{(3)} and Chicano ^{(4)}	2	November 20, 2004	1	Bayamón, Puerto Rico	Harcore Weekend (2004)	Defeated Chet Jablonski and Kasey James in a TLC match.	
47	Artillería Pesada (Thunder ^{(3)} and Lightning ^{(3)})	3	November 21, 2004	46	San Sebastián, Puerto Rico			
48	3 LiveKru (Ron Killings and Konnan)	1	January 6, 2005	23	Bayamón, Puerto Rico	Histeria Boricua (2005)		
49	Lightning ^{(4)} and Anarchy	1	January 29, 2005	29	Aguas Buenas, Puerto Rico	IWA TV Taping	Thunder suffered an injury on January 6, 2005 so Savio Vega named Anarchy Lightning's partner and co-holder of the titles.	
50	Noriega and Golden Boy	1	February 27, 2005	48	Bayamón, Puerto Rico	IWA TV Taping	On 04/16 Diabolico and Cruz stole the titles and proclaimed themselves champions	
51	La Cruz Del Diablo (Diabólico ^{(1)} and Cruz ^{(1)})	1	April 16, 2005	29	Caguas, Puerto Rico			
52	La Cruz Del Diablo (Diabólico ^{(2)} and Draco Lee ^{(1)})	1	May 15, 2005	41	Lajas, Puerto Rico		Draco Lee replaced Cruz who won the #1 contender match for the IWA World Heavyweight Championship.	
	Vacated		June 25, 2005	Bayamón, Puerto Rico			Title was Vacated after the match between La Cruz Del Diablo (Diabolico and Draco Lee) and Noriega and Golden Boy.	
53	La Cruz Del Diablo (Diabólico ^{(3)} and Draco Lee ^{(2)})	2	July 2, 2005	14	Bayamón, Puerto Rico	IWA TV Taping	Defeated Noriega and Golden Boy in a rematch.	
54	SWAT Team (I and II)	1	July 16, 2005	14	Bayamón, Puerto Rico	IWA TV Taping		
55	La Cruz Del Diablo (Diabólico ^{(4)} and Draco Lee ^{(3)})	3	July 30, 2005	44	Carolina, Puerto Rico	Summer Attitude (2005)	Defeated The SWAT Team and Noriega and Golden Boy in a 3-way match.	
56	Alex Montalvo and Golden Boy ^{(2)}	1	August 13, 2005	56	Bayamón, Puerto Rico			
57	Neo and Montana	1	October 8, 2005	14	Toa Baja, Puerto Rico			
58	Golden Boy ^{(3)} and Super Mark	1	October 22, 2005	14	Aguas Buenas, Puerto Rico			
59	Neo ^{(2)} and Montana ^{(2)}	2	November 5, 2005	62	Carolina, Puerto Rico			
60	Artillería Pesada (Thunder ^{(4)} and Lightning ^{(5)})	4	January 6, 2006	29	Toa Baja, Puerto Rico			
61	La Cruz Del Diablo (Ricky Banderas ^{(6)} and Cruzz ^{(2)})	1	February 4, 2006	7	Bayamón, Puerto Rico	IWA TV Taping		
62	Artillería Pesada (Thunder ^{(5)} and Lightning ^{(6)})	5	February 11, 2006	63	Caguas, Puerto Rico	IWA TV Taping		
63	Mr. Big and Cruzz ^{(3)}	1	April 15, 2006	29	Caguas, Puerto Rico	Apocalipsis		
64	Artillería Pesada (Thunder ^{(6)} and Lightning ^{(7)})	6	May 14, 2006	62	Bayamón, Puerto Rico			
65	Mr. Big ^{(2)} and Bad Boy Bradley	1	July 15, 2006	28	Toa Baja, Puerto Rico	IWA TV Taping		
66	Chicano ^{(5)} and Slash Venom ^{(4)}	3	August 12, 2006	22	Toa Baja, Puerto Rico	IWA TV Taping		
67	British Militia (Jon Moxley and Hade Vansen)	1	September 3, 2006	69	Aguadilla, Puerto Rico	Golpe de Estado (2006)		
70	La Zona Ilegal (Chicano ^{(6)} and "Jumpin" Jeff Jeffrey)	1	November 11, 2006	28	Carolina, Puerto Rico	IWA TV Taping		
71	La Revolución Dominicana (Bakano ^{(1)} and Joe Bravo ^{(1)} and Elí Rodríguez ^{(1)} and Balbuena ^{(1)} and Diabólico ^{(5)} and Diamante ^{(1)})	1	December 9, 2006	133	Bayamón, Puerto Rico	Christmas in PR (2006)	Bakano and Diamante defeated La Zona Ilegal in a TLC match. Any combination of La revolución dominicana is allowed to defend the titles.	
72	Los Rabiosos (Mr. Big ^{(3)} and Blitz ^{(1)})	1	April 21, 2007	56	Toa Baja, Puerto Rico	Impacto Total	Defeated Diamante and Diabólico.	
73	La Revolución Dominicana (El Diabólico ^{(6)} and El Diamante ^{(2)})	1	June 16, 2007	63	Bayamón, Puerto Rico	II Copa Jose Miguel Perez	Defeated Los Rabiosos (Mr. Big and Blitz) and Las Estrellas (G.Q. The Ravishing and Ricky Cruzz) in 3-way match.	
74	Los Aéreos (Hiram Tua ^{(1)} and 'El Sensacional' Carlitos ^{(1)})	1	August 18, 2007	14	Bayamón, Puerto Rico	Armagedon (2007)	Defeated La Revolución Dominicana in a Ladders and Penalty Box match.	
75	The Naturals (Chase Stevens ^{(1)} and Andy Douglas ^{(1)})	1	September 1, 2007	210	Bayamón, Puerto Rico	NWA Weekend		
—	Vacated	—	March 29, 2008	—		Title presumably vacated by IWA and ordered a Tournament for the Vacant titles.		
76	La Cruz Del Diablo (Cruzz ^{(4)} and Diabólico ^{(7)})	2	May 17, 2008	14	Bayamón, Puerto Rico	Juicio Final (2008)	Defeated Los Dueños de la Malicia (Dennis Rivera and Noel Rodríguez) in a tournament final.	
77	Los Dueños de la Malicia (Dennis Rivera ^{(1)} and Noel Rodríguez ^{(1)})	1	May 31, 2008	105	Toa Baja, Puerto Rico	En Ruta a la III Copa Jose Miguel Perez	Defeated Diabólico in a handicap match.	
78	La Cruz Del Diablo (Cruzz ^{(5)} and Diabólico ^{(8)})	3	September 13, 2008	63	Bayamón, Puerto Rico	Impacto Total	Defeated Los Dueños de la Malicia (Dennis Rivera and Noel Rodríguez) and The Faces of Fear (Spectro and Rainstain) in 3-way match.	
79	Los Árabes (Harrdam Kadafi ^{(1)} and Zaer Arafat ^{(1)})	1	November 15, 2008	14	Bayamón, Puerto Rico	Hardcore Weekend (2008)		
80	Los Boricuas Auténticos (Savio Vega ^{(2)} and Miguel Pérez ^{(13)})	2	November 29, 2008	14	Levittown, Puerto Rico	November to Remember		
—	Vacated	—	December 13, 2008					
81	Los Árabes (Harrdam Kadafi ^{(2)} and Zaer Arafat ^{(2)})	2	December 13, 2008	24	Bayamón, Puerto Rico	Christmas in PR (2008)	Defeated Bison and Miguel Pérez, Jr. for the vacant titles.	
82	Bison Smith and Miguel Pérez, Jr. ^{(14)}	1	January 6, 2009	18	Bayamón, Puerto Rico	Histeria Boricua (2009)		
83	Los Dueños de la Malicia (Dennis Rivera ^{(2)} and Noel Rodríguez ^{(2)})	2	January 24, 2009	21	Toa Alta, Puerto Rico			
84	The Latin American Xchange (Homicide ^{(1)} and Hernandez ^{(1)})	1	February 14, 2009	91	Bayamón, Puerto Rico	Noche de Campeones (2009)		
—	Vacated	—	May 16, 2009	Bayamón, Puerto Rico	Juicio Final (2009)			
85	Los Árabes (Harrdam Kadafi ^{(3)} and Zaer Arafat ^{(3)})	3	July 18, 2009	29	Bayamón, Puerto Rico	IWA Decimo Aniversario	Defeated La Amenaza Ilegal (Chicano and Bryan), La Malicia (Noel Rodríguez and Richard Rondón) and Chris Joel and Golden Boy in a Fatal 4-way match.	
86	La Amenaza Ilegal (Bryan ^{(1)} and Chicano ^{(7)})	1	August 16, 2009	28	Cataño, Puerto Rico	Golpe de Estado (2009)		
87	Los Nuevos Dueños de la Malicia (Rick Stanley and Noel Rodríguez ^{(3)})	1	September 13, 2009	6	Hatillo, Puerto Rico	Impacto Total		
88	Los Auténticos (Chicano ^{(8)} and Dennis Rivera ^{(3)})	1	September 19, 2009	8	Bayamón, Puerto Rico	Armagedon (2009)		
89	Los Árabes (Harrdam Kadafi ^{(4)} and Zaer Arafat ^{(4)})	4	September 27, 2009	6	Yauco, Puerto Rico			
90	Los Auténticos (Chicano ^{(9)} and Dennis Rivera ^{(4)})	2	October 3, 2009	7	Cataño, Puerto Rico	Impacto Total		
91	Los Árabes (Harrdam Kadafi ^{(5)} and Zaer Arafat ^{(5)})	5	October 10, 2009	49	Bayamón, Puerto Rico			
92	Los Fugitivos de la Calle (Niche ^{(1)} and Lynx ^{(1)})	1	November 28, 2009	14	Sabana Grande, Puerto Rico	IWA TV Taping	Arabes didn't win the match in 5 minutes so they had to defend the titles.	
93	Los Árabes (Harrdam Kadafi ^{(6)} and Zaer Arafat ^{(6)})	6	December 12, 2009	25	Bayamón, Puerto Rico	Christmas in PR (2009)	Defeated Los Fugitivos de la Calle (Niche and Lynx) and Los Nuevos Dueños de la Malicia (Noel Rodríguez and Rick Stanley) in a 3-way match.	
94	La Doble R (Richard Rondón and Romeo)	1	January 6, 2010	38	Bayamón, Puerto Rico	Histeria Boricua (2010)	Defeated Los Árabes (Harrdam Kadafi and Zaer Arafat) and Los Nuevos Dueños de la Malicia (Noel Rodríguez and Rick Stanley)in a 3-way TLC match.	
95	La Compañía Elíte (Gilbert and Rick Stanley ^{(2)})	1	February 13, 2010	63	Bayamón, Puerto Rico	Payback (2010)		
96	The Faces of Fear (Spectro and Rainstain)	1	April 17, 2010	15	Bayamón, Puerto Rico	Juicio Final (2010)		
97	La Compañía Elíte (Gilbert and Rick Stanley ^{(3)})	2	May 2, 2010	20	Las Marías, Puerto Rico	1ra Ronda Copa Alcalde	Unclear who were previous champions	
98	The Faces Of Fear (Spectro and Rainstain)	2	May 22, 2010	98	Las Piedras, Puerto Rico	Impacto Total	Defeated La Compañía Elíte (Gilbert and Rick Stanley) and Barbie Boy and Queen Adonis in 3-way match.	
99	The Kongs (Kong I and Kong II)	1	August 28, 2010	14	Yabucoa, Puerto Rico	Impacto Total		
100	The Faces of Fear (Spectro ^{(3)} and Rainstain ^{(3)})	3	September 11, 2010	14	Bayamón, Puerto Rico	Golpe de Estado (2010)		
101	The Kongs (Kong I ^{(2)} and Kong II ^{(2)})	2	September 25, 2010	7	Lajas, Puerto Rico	Impacto Total	Defeated Spectro in a Handicap match.	
102	Rick Stanley ^{(4)} and Dennis Rivera ^{(5)}	1	October 2, 2010	18	Añasco, Puerto Rico	Impacto Total		
103	Los Ídolos de los Niños (Átomo and Sónico)	1	November 20, 2010	84	Lajas, Puerto Rico	Impacto Total		
104	Cruzz of Fear (Spectro ^{(4)} and Damián)	1	February 12, 2011	49	Bayamón, Puerto Rico	Payback (2011)		
105	Artillería Pesada (Thunder ^{(7)} and Lightning ^{(8)})	7	April 2, 2011	70	Toa Baja, Puerto Rico	Juicio Final (2011)		
106	Los Dueños de la Malicia (Dennis Rivera ^{(6)} and Noel Rodríguez ^{(4)})	3	June 11, 2011	56	Bayamón, Puerto Rico	V Copa Jose Miguel Perez	Defeated La Artillería Pesada and Zona 101 (Chicano and Abbad).	
107	Zaion and Big Jonathan	1	August 6, 2011	14	Ciales, Puerto Rico	Impacto Total	Chicano didn't arrive on time so Jonathan replaced him.	
—	Vacated	—	August 20, 2011	Vega Alta, Puerto Rico	Impacto Total	Title Stripped by the IWA president Miguel Pérez.		
108	Los Dueños de la Malicia (Dennis Rivera ^{(7)} and Noel Rodríguez ^{(5)})	4	August 20, 2011	161	Vega Alta, Puerto Rico	Impacto Total	Title returned by the IWA president Miguel Pérez later Los dueños de la malica defeated Los Fugitivos de la Calle (Niche and Lynx) for the WWC World Tag Team titles on September 24, 2011 in Caguas, Puerto Rico. Also defeated La Milicia (Guevara and Zapata) in a triple title match for the WWC, IWA and EWO World Tag Team titles on November 5, 2011 in Santurce, Puerto Rico to be the Unified Tag Team Champions of the three major companies in Puerto Rico.	
109	The New Faces of Fear (Spectro ^{(5)} and Destro)	1	January 28, 2012	0	Toa Alta, Puerto Rico	Histeria Boricua (2012)		
110	La Milicia (Guevara and Zapata)	1	January 28, 2012	14	Toa Alta, Puerto Rico	Histeria Boricua (2012)	La Milicia interfered the match between The New Faces of Fear (Spectro and Destro) and Los Dueños de la Malicia (Dennis Rivera and Noel Rodríguez) to take the titles and proclaim themselves Champions.	
111	Los Invasores/La Fuerza Aérea (Shock and Riddix)	1	February 11, 2012	35	Toa Alta, Puerto Rico	Kaos and Odissey	Defeated La Milicia and Los Perros de la Muerte in a 3-way match.	
112	La Milicia (Guevara and Zapata)	2	March 17, 2012	91	Santurce, Puerto Rico	Clash of the Titans (2012)		
113	Los Dueños de la Malicia (Dennis Rivera ^{(8)} and Noel Rodríguez ^{(6)})	5	June 16, 2012	0	Bayamón, Puerto Rico			
—	Deactivated	—	June 16, 2012	—	—	When IWA closed for six years.		
114	Puro Macho (Khriz Diaz and JC Navarro)	1	May 18, 2019	0	Mayagüez, Puerto Rico	Promised Land	Puro Macho won the IWA World Tag Team Championship Tournament but loss the title against Legio in a Flash Rematch ordered by Dennis Rivera.	
115	Legio (Spectro ^{(6)} and Vassago)	1	May 18, 2019	112	Mayagüez, Puerto Rico	Promised Land	Legio won the IWA World Tag Team Championship in a Flash Rematch ordered by Dennis Rivera, against Khriz Diaz and JC Navarro.	
116	Puro Macho (Khriz Diaz and JC Navarro)	2	September 7, 2019	182	Guaynabo, Puerto Rico	Golpe de Estado (2019)		
117	Los Fugitivos (Niche & Lynx)	2	March 7, 2020	511	Humacao, Puerto Rico	Histeria Boricua (2020)		
118	The Owners of Time (Nick Mercer & Leinord White)	1	July 31, 2021	110	San Juan, Puerto Rico	La Gran Amenaza (2021)		
119	Manú & Edrax	1	November 18, 2021	1	San Juan, Puerto Rico	Impacto Total		
120	The Owners of Time (Nick Mercer & Leinord White)	2	November 19, 2021	58	San Juan, Puerto Rico	Impacto Total		
121	5150 (Danny Rivera and Slice Boogie)	1	January 16, 2022	34	Manatí, Puerto Rico	Impacto Total		
122	Lightning ^{(9)} & Mr. Big ^{(2)}	1	February 19, 2022	21	Manatí, Puerto Rico	Impacto Total		
123	The Owners of Time (Nick Mercer & Leinord White)	3	March 12, 2022	42	Humacao, Puerto Rico	Histeria Boricua (2022)		
—	Vacated	—	—	—	—			
124	La Artilleria Ilegal (Chicano^{(10)} & Lightning ^{(10)}) (IWE half)	1	April 30, 2022	0	Humacao, Puerto Rico	Juicio Final (2022)	Defeated Owners of Time to win the IWE belts. Titles were previously vacant.	
125	Drunken Express (Xcellent Martel & Pupe Jackson) (IWA Half)	1	April 30, 2022	35	Humacao, Puerto Rico	Juicio Final (2022)	Defeated La Supremacia del Pancracio to win the IWA belts.Titles were previously vacant.	
126	La Excelencia Del Pancracio (Jax Di Franco & Gonzalo Leon) (IWA Half)	1	June 4, 2022	0	Lajas, Puerto Rico	La Gran Amenaza (2022)	Defeated Drunken Express to win the IWA belts.	
127	Faces of Destiny (Nick Mercer & Jay Blake) (IWE Half)	1	June 4, 2022	14	Lajas, Puerto Rico	La Gran Amenaza (2022)	Defeated Chicano & Jova El Ilegal to win the IWE belts.	
128	Drunken Express (Xcellent Martel & Pupe Jackson) (IWA Half)	2	June 18, 2022	28	Humacao, Puerto Rico	Summer Attitude El Tour (2022)	Defeated La Supremacia del Pancracio to win the IWA belts.	
129	Los Inhumanos (Invader I & Savio Vega) (IWE Half)	1	July 16, 2022	0	Vega Alta, Puerto Rico	Summer Attitude El Tour (2022)	Defeated Faces of Destiny to win the IWE belts.	
130	Dean Rose & Hell Blaze (IWA Half)	1	July 16, 2022	7	Vega Alta, Puerto Rico	Summer Attitude El Tour (2022)	Defeated Drunken Express on a Handicap Match to win the IWA belts.	
131	Drunken Express (Xcellent Martel & Pupe Jackson) (IWA Half)	3	July 23, 2022	0	Lajas, Puerto Rico	Summer Attitude El Tour (2022)	Defeated Dean Rose & Hell Blaze to win the IWA belts.	
132	Faces of Destiny (Nick Mercer & Jay Blake) (IWE Half/Unification)	2	July 23, 2022	501	Lajas, Puerto Rico	Summer Attitude El Tour (2022)	Defeated Los Inhumanos to win the IWE belts then defeated Drunken Express on November 19 to win the IWA belts and become the undisputed Tag Team Champions.	
133	La Industria (El Cuervo & Justin Cotto)	1	December 6, 2023	129	Juncos, Puerto Rico	IWA Puerto Rico Christmas In PR 2023	This was a Tables, ladders, and chairs match.	
135	Doom Patrol (Cold, Warant and Krystal)	1	April 13, 2024	147	Trujillo Alto, Puerto Rico	Juicio Final (2024)	Cold and Warant won the titles, but Krystal is also recognized as champion under the freebird rules. Thus becoming the first female in IWA History to be recognized as World Tag Team Champion.	
136	La Alianza (Romeo, Manú and Xavier Millet)	1	August 31, 2024	210	Juncos, Puerto Rico	Conflicto Letal		
137	2 Hot 4 U (Edrax and Cesar Aldea)	1	Abril 5, 2025	106	Humacao, Puerto Rico	Juicio Final (2025)		
138	Mike Mendoza and Justin Cotto	1	September 27, 2025	91	Humacao, Puerto Rico	Golpe de Estado		
139	Sangre Pura (Edrax Torres and Máscara Pura)	1	December 27, 2025	56	Humacao, Puerto Rico	Christmas Hardcore Weekend		
140	Matty Ice and Nic Nolan	1	February 21, 2026	49	Vega Baja, Puerto Rico	Vendetta		
141	The MonSTARs Inc. (Chupacabras and Moixilla)	1	April 11, 2026	14	Las Vegas, Nevada	Independent Event		
142	2 Hot 4 U (Edrax and Cesar Aldea	2	April 25, 2026	21	San Juan, Puerto Rico	Daño Colateral		
143	El Gladiador Boricua and El Súper Átomo	1	May 16, 2026	21	Loiza, Puerto Rico	El Gran Festival de Lucha Libre		
144	The American Franchise (Big Tito Lincoln and Cesar Aldea)	1	June 6, 2026	63	Humacao, Puerto Rico	Legend Mania		
145	Barbie Boy and Mr. Iguana	1	August 8, 2026	70	Humacao, Puerto Rico	Summer Attitude		
—	Vacant		October 17, 2026		Humacao, Puerto Rico	Golpe de Estado	Due to the physical absence of Mr. Iguana	
146	Jon Dave Rose & Joe Anthony	1	October 17, 2026	13+	Humacao, Puerto Rico	Golpe de Estado	He defeated Pedro Portillo iii and Cesar Aldea for the vacant titles	

== Combined reigns ==
=== By team ===
†	Indicates the current champion

Rank	Wrestler	No. of reigns	Combined days
1	Los Fugitivos de la Calle (Niche and Lynx)	2	525
2	La Artillería Pesada (Thunder and Lightning)	7	490
3	Starr Corporation (Chicky Starr and Victor The Bodyguard)	6	355
4	Los Dueños de la Malicia (Dennis Rivera and Noel Rodríguez)	4	343
5	Los Boricuas (Huracán Castillo and Miguel Pérez)	6	269
6	The Owners of Time (Nick Mercer and Leinord White)	3	225
7	The Naturals (Chase Stevens and Andy Douglas)	1	210
8	Puro Macho (JC Navarro and Khris Diaz)	1	182
9	Eric Alexander and Craven	2	178
10	The Faces of Fear (Spectro and Rainstain)	3	133
10	La Revolución Dominicana (Bakano and Joe Bravo and Elí Rodríguez and Balbuena and Diabólico and Diamante)	1	133
11	Los Árabes (Zaer Arafat and Harrdam Kadafi)	6	125
12	La Cruz Del Diablo (Cruzz and Diabólico)	3	107
13	La Milicia (Guevara and Zapata)	2	105
13	S.O.S (Andy Anderson and Vyzago)	1	105
14	The Latin American Xchange (Homicide and Hernandez)	1	94
15.	Los Boricuas Auténticos (Miguel Pérez, Jr. and Savio Vega)	2	92
16.	Los Ídolos de los Niños (Átomo and Sónico)	1	84
17.	La Compañía Elíte (Gilbert and Rick Stanley)	2	77
18.	Abyss and Miguel Pérez, Jr.	2	76
18.	Neo and Montana	2	76
19.	British Militia (Jon Moxley and Hade Vansen)	1	69
20.	La Cruz Del Diablo (Diabólico and Draco Lee)	3	68
21.	La Revolución Dominicana (El Diabólico and El Diamante)	1	63
22.	2 Hot 4u (Edrax and Cesar Aldea)	1	573
22.	Val Venis and Ricky Santana	1	56
22.	Golden Boy and Alex Montalvo	1	56
22.	Los Rabiosos (Mr. Big and Blitz)	1	56
23.	Los Intocables (Ricky Banderas and Huracán Castillo and Miguel Perez, Jr. and Fidel Sierra and Pain)	1	55
23.	Eric Alexander and Andy Anderson	1	55
24.	Cruzz of Fear (Spectro and Damian)	1	50
25.	Rick Stanley and Dennis Rivera	1	49
26.	Golden Boy and Noriega	1	47
27.	Chicano and Slash Venom	3	44
28.	Lightning and Anarchy	1	43
29.	La Doble R (Richard Rondón and Romeo)	1	38
30.	Los Auténticos (Chicano and Dennis Rivera)	2	36
31.	Chet Jablonski and Kasey James	1	35
31.	Los Invasores/La Fuerza Aérea (Shock and Riddix)	1	35
31.	5150 (Danny "Limelight" Rivera & Slime Boogie)	1	35
32.	Lightning & Mr. Big	1	21
32.	La Nueva Generación (Ricky Banderas and Gran Apolo)	3	29
32.	Mr. Big and Cruzz	1	29
33.	The New Corporation (Agente Bruno and Faraón Zaruxx)	1	28
33.	Mr. Big and Bad Boy Bradley	1	28
33.	La Zona Ilegal (Chicano and "Jumpin" Jeff Jeffrey)	1	28
33.	La Amenaza Ilegal (Bryan and Chicano)	1	28
34.	Miguel Pérez, Jr. and Apolo	1	27
34.	D'Lo Brown and Glamour Boy Shane	1	27
35.	3Live Kru (Ron Killings & Konnan)	1	23
36.	The Kongs (Kong I and Kong II)	2	21
36.	The New Corporation (Big Ross McCollough and Tiger Ali Singh)	1	21
36.	Lightning & Mr. Big	1	21
37.	Los Ilegales (Stefano and Chicano)	1	18
38.	Bison Smith and Miguel Pérez, Jr.	1	18
39.	The New Corporation (Pain and Tiger Ali Singh)	1	14
39.	Abyss and Glamour Boy Shane	1	14
39.	SWAT Team (I and II)	1	14
39.	Golden Boy and Super Mark	1	14
39.	Los Aéreos (Hiram Tua and Carlitos)	1	14
39.	Zcion and Big Jonathan	1	14
40.	Los Desertores (Miguel Perez and Slash Venom)	1	12
41.	Hermanos del Dolor (Glamour Boy Shane and Ricky Banderas)	1	8
42.	Ricky Santana and Sean Hill	1	7
42.	Andy Anderson and Headhunter II	1	7
42.	La Cruz Del Diablo (Ricky Banderas and Cruzz)	1	7
43.	Glamour Boy Shane and Kasey James	1	6
43.	Los Nuevos Dueños de la Malicia (Rick Stanley and Noel Rodríguez)	1	6
44	Manú & Edrax	1	1
45.	The New Corporation (Pain and "Primetime" Ángel Rodríguez)	1	1>
45.	Chicano and Craven	1	1>
45.	The New Faces of Fear (Spectro and Destro)	1	1>
45.	La Artillería Ilegal (Chicano & Lightning)	1	1>

=== By Wrestler ===
Rank	Wrestler	No. of reigns	Combined days
1.	Lightning	10	554
2.	Miguel Pérez, Jr.	14	549
3.	Niche	2	525
3.	Lynx	2	525
4.	Thunder	7	490
5.	Dennis Rivera	7	428
6.	Diabólico	8	371
7.	Chicky Starr	6	355
7.	Victor The Bodyguard	6	355
8.	Noel Rodríguez	5	349
9.	Huracán Castillo	7	324
10.	Eric Alexander	3	233
11.	Leinord White	3	225
11.	Nick Mercer	3	225
12.	Chase Stevens	1	210
12.	Andy Douglas	1	210
13.	Diamante	2	196
14.	Andy Anderson	7	193
15.	JC Navarro	1	182
15.	Khris Diaz	1	182
16.	Craven	3	178
17.	Spectro	5	169
18.	Chicano	10	154
19.	Cruzz	5	143
20.	Mr. Big	3	134
21.
21.	Rainstain	3	133
21.	Bakano	1	133
21.	Joe Bravo	1	133
21.	Elí Rodríguez	1	133
21.	Balbuena	1	133
18.	Rick Stanley	4	132
22.	Harrdam Kadafi	6	125
22.	Zaer Arafat	6	125
23.	Golden Boy	3	117
24.	Vyzago	1	105
25.	Ricky Banderas	5	99
26.	Homicide	1	94
26.	Hernandez	1	94
26.	Savio Vega	2	92
27.	Abyss	3	90
28.	Átomo	1	84
28.	Sónico	1	84
29.	Gilbert	2	77
30.	Neo	2	76
30.	Montana	2	76
31.	Pain	3	69
31.	Jon Moxley	1	69
31.	Hade Vansen	1	69
32.	Draco Lee	3	68
33.	Ricky Santana	2	63
34.	Edrax	1	573
34.	Cesar Aldea	1	573
35.	Slash Venom	4	56
36.	Gran Apolo	3	56
36.	Val Venis	1	56
36.	Alex Montalvo	1	56
36.	Blitz	1	56
37.	Glamour Boy Shane	4	55
37.	Fidel Sierra	1	55
38.	Damian	1	50
39.	Noriega	1	47
40.	Anarchy	1	43
41.	Kasey James	2	41
42.	Richard Rondón	1	38
42.	Romeo	1	38
43.	Tiger Ali Singh	2	35
43.	Danny "Limelight" Rivera	1	35
43.	Slime Boogie	1	35
44.	Faraón Zaruxx	1	28
44.	Agente Bruno	1	28
44.	Bad Boy Bradley	1	28
44.	"Jumpin" Jeff Jeffrey	1	28
44.	Bryan	1	28
45.	D'Lo Brown	1	27
46.	Ron Killings	1	23
46.	Konnan	1	23
47.	Kong I	2	21
48.	Kong II	2	21
49.	Big Ross McCollough	1	21
50.	Bison Smith	1	17
51.	Stefano	1	18
52.	SWAT I	1	14
52.	SWAT II	1	14
52.	Super Mark	1	14
52.	Hiram Tua	1	14
52.	Carlitos	1	14
53.	Sean Hill	1	7
53.	Headhunter II	1	7
54.	"Primetime" Ángel Rodríguez	1	1>
54.	Destro	1	1>
