= Ice Soldiers =

- DVD cover
- Directed by: Sturla Gunnarsson
- Written by: Jonathan Tydor
- Produced by: Jeff Sackman; David Anselmo
- Starring: Dominic Purcell; Adam Beach; Michael Ironside; Gabriel Hogan; Camille Sulivan; Benz Antoine
- Cinematography: Stephen Reizes
- Edited by: Roger Mattiussi
- Music by: Jonathan Goldsmith
- Production company: Bunk 11 Pictures
- Distributed by: Sony Pictures Home Entertainment
- Release dates: 5 December 2013 (Whistler Film Festival); 28 February 2014 (North America)
- Running time: 95 minutes
- Country: Canada
- Language: English

Ice Soldiers is a 2013 Canadian action-science fiction film directed by Sturla Gunnarsson and starring Dominic Purcell, Adam Beach and Michael Ironside. In the film, Malraux (Purcell), and a team of Canadian scientists release a group of frozen Soviet-era soldiers who attempt to complete their original mission: a devastating attack on the United States.

== Plot ==
In 1962, during the Cuban Missile Crisis, a team of Canadian troops in the arctic discover a crashed plane containing three Soviet soldiers with superhuman abilities. The Canadian forces take them back to base for examination by government scientists but the soldiers later break free and kill many of the troops stationed in the north before fleeing into the wilderness. Fifty years later, a team of Canadian military and scientists, including Dr. Malraux, and Dr. Lobokoff, discover the super soldiers buried beneath the Arctic ice. Malraux explains to the group that the Soviet soldiers were genetically modified by political extremists during the Crisis in 1962 using aid from a captured Nazi scientist and their original mission was to carry out a terrorist attack on New York City with the intent of triggering World War 3. While examining the bodies the scientists discover to their amazement that the soldiers are still alive and gradually regenerating. The scientists then begin to debate what to do with them but fail to reach an agreement. Malraux afraid of what the soldiers might do if they awaken tries and fails to kill them by cutting off their life support. Malraux is locked up for his actions but his fears about the soldiers are later justified as they soon awaken from their hibernation and go on a killing spree that claims much of the military and science personnel including Lobokoff. Surviving their attack, Malraux breaks free and rushes into the wilderness after them, eventually encountering a troubled Cree aboriginal ex-con named Thundercloud Cardinal or “T.C” who agrees to act as a guide for Malraux, as T.C’s father was one of the few survivors of the Soviets first rampage in the 1960s. With some effort they eventually manage to track them to a small oil drilling town where the three had apparently learned from a patron in a Russian Strip club about a mine where they could acquire explosives. Malraux and T.C head to the mine but arrive too late and are mistakenly arrested for the theft of the explosives and the murder of the miners. Malraux tries to warn the sheriff that the soldiers are probably attempting to perform a preprogrammed military exercise they had previously carried out but he is ignored. That night just as predicted the soldiers blow up the town’s power plant and proceed to massacre the local government officials and much of the police force. In the confusion Malraux and T.C escape and chase after the soldiers truck on a snowmobile. After a hectic chase Malraux and T.C are able to trick the truck into ramming into the side of a mountain. The crash triggers a fire that ignites the remaining explosives in the truck and kills two of the soldiers, however the third soldier is found to be missing. Malraux then realizes the last super soldier is on his way to hijack a small plane headed to New York and races to the airport. At the last minute Malraux is able to force the soldier off the plane. The two of them then fight and after a difficult struggle Malraux managed to get the upper hand and stab the final soldier to death. Later as he and T.C are cremating the last soldier’s remains Malraux reveals that his mother was one of the scientists who had examined the soldiers in the 60s and that she had been raped by the soldier they are cremating, making Malraux the super soldier’s son. He remarks that his mother had till her very last day been filled with worry about what sort of man he might grow up to be. T.C then tries to comfort Malraux and says Malraux is not like his father and is a good man, however in the end Malraux states he is still not sure of that.

== Cast ==
- Dominic Purcell as Dr. Andrew Malraux
- Adam Beach as TC Cardinal
- Michael Ironside as Col. Desmond Trump
- Gabriel Hogan as Frozen #1:
  The film’s primary antagonist. David Anselmo, president of Hideaway Pictures, had to say "Gabe Hogan is phenomenal in this film as the bad guy… He really brings a dread, an eerie dread, to a character, which I was surprised at."
- Camille Sullivan as Jane Frazer
- Nicu Branzea as Vladimir Lobokoff
- Benz Antoine as Sgt. Joe Gibbs
- Matthew G. Taylor as Frozen #2
- Andre Tricoteux as Frozen #3
- Carinne Leduc as Juliet
- Jamie Roy as Radio Operator #1
- Raoul Bhaneja as Bates
- Kristina Nicoll as Chief Melody Ripinski
- Jason Abel as Lieutenant Ken McKenzie
- Stefen Hayes as Mitka Dorovich (Russian Oil Executive)

== Production ==
Ice Soldiers was filmed in the Sudbury, Ontario area in 2013. Director, Sturla Gunnarsson, said of the environment "Every day you’re out in the elements, making a storm with a dozen big wind machines, or doing a chase with a Hummer on tracks and a snowmobile… I haven’t seen that chase before, those kinds of vehicles on that landscape. It was a big toybox." The film premiered at the College Boreal Concert hall in Sudbury on February 28, 2014.

== Marketing ==
A trailer for the film was released on November 26, 2013.

== Reception ==
Norman Wilner of Now wrote, "It's all pretty generic, and very stupid". David Johnson of DVD Verdict called it "pretty much standard-issue stalking and stabbing." Jay Stone of Canada.com rated it 2/5 stars and called it "a gleefully preposterous slice of B movie cheese". Likewise, Dennis Shwartz of Ozus’ World Movie Reviews called the film "a disposable B-film, whose best virtue might be in how great the snow looks."
