= Jonathan Ayala =

Puerto Rican wrestler (born 1992)

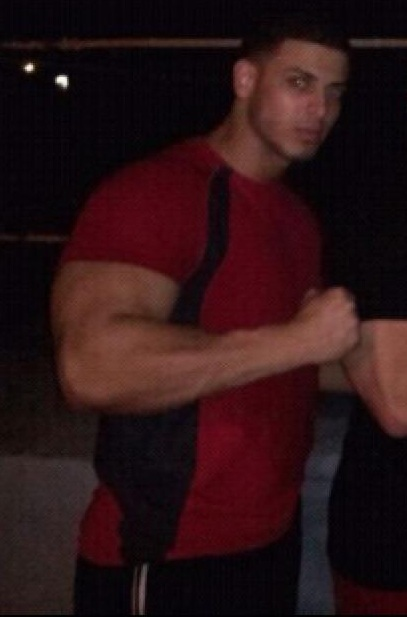

Personal information
- Born: Jonathan Ayala Quiñones; March 3, 1992 (age 34)

Professional wrestling career
- Ring name(s): Atlas; Big Jonathan; Diego de Jesús; Sebastián Guerra
- Billed height: 6 ft 4 in (1.93 m)
- Billed weight: 290 lb (130 kg)
- Billed from: Yabucoa, Puerto Rico
- Trained by: Savio Vega
- Debut: 2011

Jonathan Ayala Quiñones (born March 3, 1992) is a Puerto Rican professional wrestler, best known by his ring names Diego de Jesús, Sebastián Guerra and ATLAS. He is a graduate of the Savio Vega Wrestling Academy and began his career working for the International Wrestling Association, where he won the IWA World Tag Team Championship in his debut. Ayala later migrated to the World Wrestling Council, where he appeared as a part-time performer.

== Personal life ==
Ayala became interested in professional wrestling at a very early age. His grandfather used to attend the cards held by the World Wrestling Council (WWC), where he became a follower of Ray González. As a teenager, he was inspired by Germán Figueroa, beginning weight training at the age of 15. Three years later he began training to become a wrestler, with the help of his compadre, performer Luis Maldonado who would hitchhike him to the classes when he still did not own a car. Afterwards, Ayala joined the newly opened Savio Vega Wrestling Academy in Trujillo Alto, training there for almost a year. He would train two days per week, Mondays and Wednesdays. Despite suffering an ankle fracture that suspended his training for a period of three months, he continued forward and graduated. As part of his training, Ayala would visit the IWA cards in a non-active role.

Ayala married his fiancée in 2016. After training at the Juncos amateur wrestling gym, Ayala made his debut on October 15, 2016, finishing second in the Puerto Rico Beach Wrestling Tournament. In 2019, he joined José Estrada Sr. to inaugurate the Humacao Professional Wrestling Academy, the first of its kind in that region of Puerto Rico. Besides support from a number of veterans, the institution was also supported by Hugo Savinovich who had taken up a sponsor role in Ayala's career.

== Professional wrestling career ==
=== Early career, IWA and WWC (2011–2014) ===
On August 6, 2011, Ayala participated in a tryout for the International Wrestling Association. Later on the same night he made his official debut, winning the IWA World Tag Team Championship along Féliz "Zaion" Torres Vega by replacing an injured Carlos Cotto. The following week, the titles were stripped and returned to the former champions, Dennis Rivera and Noel Rodríguez. After being called "Big Jonathan" in an edition of Impacto Total, he was rebranded as "Diego de Jesús", a name proposed by Savio Vega. Ayala and his partner won a match to recover the first contenders' spot, but failed to win the titles. They continued to pursue the titles, being uninvolved in the conclusion of a four way match at Halloween Mayhem and losing a first contenders' eliminatory in the following card. Despite competing in several tag team contests, Ayala remained unpinned and an angle against Chris Angel, the only wrestler to win the IWA Undisputed World Heavyweight Championship undefeated, was teased in a faceoff. In his individual debut, he won a handicap match against El Generico and a third wrestler. Ayala closed the year by being voted "Rookie of the Year" in Puerto Rico Wrestling's Best of the Year public vote. Like his predecessor, Chris Angel, he won the award after only one singles match, but with participation in more than one official contest. On January 28, 2012, Ayala won his first one-on-one contest, as part of the undercard of Histeria Boricua. Despite being featured in promotional material for Kaos and Odyssey, an annual event, he was not included in the official card.

Ayala left the IWA shortly afterwards, still unpinned in singles competition. Now known as "Sebastián Guerra", he reappeared on April 9, 2012, following months of inactivity and was announced as the new member of The Academy, a stable previously formed by Angel and Phillip Cardona. The decision to join WWC was coordinated between the three wrestlers. However, the following month the group splintered when Ayala announced his return to the IWA's Juicio Final show and the original members debuted in WWC. This was based on a desire to remain active. After Juicio Final was postponed for specified reasons and the IWA entered a hiatus, Ayala visited a WWC card as a fan. After appearing in the crowd, he was invited to join WWC by Carlos Colón, Sr. and later attended an official interview. No longer a member of The Academy, he was reintroduced as a planted fan, having weekly verbal confrontations with Andy Levine. At Noche del Fanático, Ayala interfered in a match between Levine and Germán Figueroa. On September 28, 2012, Ayala made his in-ring debut by defeating a jobber. At Halloween Wrestling Xtravaganza he won a three-way match, leaving both of his opponents unconscious in the ring. Later in the card, Ayala aided Angel by distracting his opponent. He lost his first singles match to Samson Walker, who was able to pin him down while manager Orlando Toledo held his leg from outside the ring.

On November 17, 2012, Ayala was included in a tournament for the vacant WWC Puerto Rico Heavyweight Championship, but was eliminated. In the final event of the year, he defeated "El Súper Gladiador" Ricky Fontán by submission. At Euphoria 2013. Ayala defeated "El Diabolico" Rolando Hernández. This was followed by a single-elimination four way match, where the other participants were Figueroa, Levine and The Sandman, but he was not one of the finalists. Both former members of The Academy reunited in an unsuccessful challenge against Thunder and Lightning. Afterwards, Ayala returned to singles competition, performing in a match to determine the first contender for the WWC Puerto Rico Heavyweight Championship. His following appearances were losses against Savio Vega and Andy Levine. Ayala was then placed over a series of jobbers, including Julio "Barrabas, Jr." López. At La Hora de La Verdad, he teamed with Enrique Elier Sinagaglia in a losing effort. The former members of The Academy met again afterwards, this time as opponents, with Angel defeating Ayala. Now serving as a part-time performer, he lost to Gilbert Cruz on October 19, 2013. His next appearance was a win over AJ Castillo. At Crossfire 2013, Ayala lost to Pedro "Ash" Arbelo due to illegal tactics.

=== International exposition and tryouts (2013–2014) ===
A World Wrestling Entertainment scout was present at WWC's Euphoria 2013 event. This was his very first major event in the promotion and Ayala was only made aware of the scout's presence moments before his match. This individual issued a favorable review of Ayala, based on his youth, physique and stature, offering him a tryout for the multinational company. The tryout took place on August 30, 2013, at the WWE Performance Center in Orlando, Florida. Among the WWE personnel present was Triple H, William Regal, Jesse James, Dusty Rhodes, Steve Taylor, Joe Mercury, Norman Smiley, Jim Ross and some active roster wrestlers. Ayala was the youngest among 30 participants, as well as the only Latino in attendance as part of the Performance Center's inaugural recruitment class. He was paired with Davey Richards in the tryout match. This was the very first time that he had traveled outside of Puerto Rico and he was accompanied by fellow wrestler Samson Walker. Based on the recommendations offered at this event, Ayala devised an action plan, where he would join the now-independent Ohio Valley Wrestling to work on his English promos and adapt to the WWE's style. Once this stage is completed, he expects to join NXT. Shortly afterwards, WWE's main rival Total Nonstop Action Wrestling also showed interest in him following a scouting report of its own. The promotion personally extended a tryout invitation and its co-founder, Jeff Jarrett, was involved in the recruitment. However, due to the possibility of losing the chance to join NXT, Ayala decided to continue his original plan. Jarrett himself left TNA shortly afterwards. On May 31, 2014, Ayala joined the World Wrestling League, where he would wrestle in a tag team with Figueroa under a new character, ATLAS. However, this arrangement was temporary, until he permanently moved to Orlando in order to join NXT.

== Championships and accomplishments ==
- International Wrestling Association (Puerto Rico)
  - IWA World Tag Team Championship (1 time) – with Félix "Zcion" Torres

== See also ==
- Professional wrestling in Puerto Rico
