= El Nazareno =

Puerto Rican wrestler (born 1979)

- El Nazareno in May 2017

Personal information
- Born: Peter Concepción Arbelo; July 18, 1979 (age 47) San Sebastián, Puerto Rico

Professional wrestling career
- Ring name(s): Ash; Ash Rubynski; Bull Bronski; Damián; Face of Fear Ash; Superstar Ash; El Nazareno
- Billed height: 6 ft 0 in (1.83 m)
- Billed weight: 284 lb (129 kg)
- Trained by: Invader III
- Debut: 2005

Peter Concepción Arbelo (born July 18, 1979) is a Puerto Rican professional wrestler better known by his ringname El Nazareno. He has performed under several personas during his career including Ash Rubinsky, Bull Bronski, Face of Fear Ash, Damián and Superstar Ash. Concepción has wrestled in all of the major local promotions winning the IWA Caribbean Heavyweight Championship, IWA Junior Heavyweight Championship and IWA World Tag Team Championship in the International Wrestling Association (IWA), the WWC Puerto Rico Heavyweight Championship, WWC World Tag Team Championship and WWC Television Championship in the World Wrestling Council (WWC) and the WWL World Heavyweight Championship in the World Wrestling League (WWL). He has also been regularly active in the independent circuit, making appearances in New Wrestling Stars (NWS), where he held the NWS Tag Team Championship and NWS Television Championship, CWS, NWG and 100% Lucha where he won the tag team titles. Currently, the leader of the interpromotional West Side Mafia stable, he has been involved with several stables during his run, including Los HPs, Faces of Fear, Los Templarios and El Consejo.

== Professional wrestling career ==
=== Westside Mafia; faux retirement and CWS (2016–2017) ===
On January 14, 2017, Concepción and the Westside Mafia addressed the crowd in an event where he announced a premature retirement citing lingering injuries and in the process vacating the WWL World Heavyweight Championship. However, later that night he made an appearance in Championship Wrestling School (CWS), a developmental promotion that had recently received the support of a returning Negrín, pursuing vengeance against BJ and attacking other heels. Prior to this, the promotion had already hinted his presence by publishing a darkened silhouette of him on January 13, 2017, promoting him as a surprise that would face Negrín and his La Sociedad stable (of which BJ was a member). This appearance was followed by a hiatus. On March 18, 2017, Concepción reappeared in the CWS under a mask as part the Zona Urbana event, antagonizing Negrín and La Sociedad.

=== Return to WWL and the "blessing of El Nazareno" (2017–present) ===
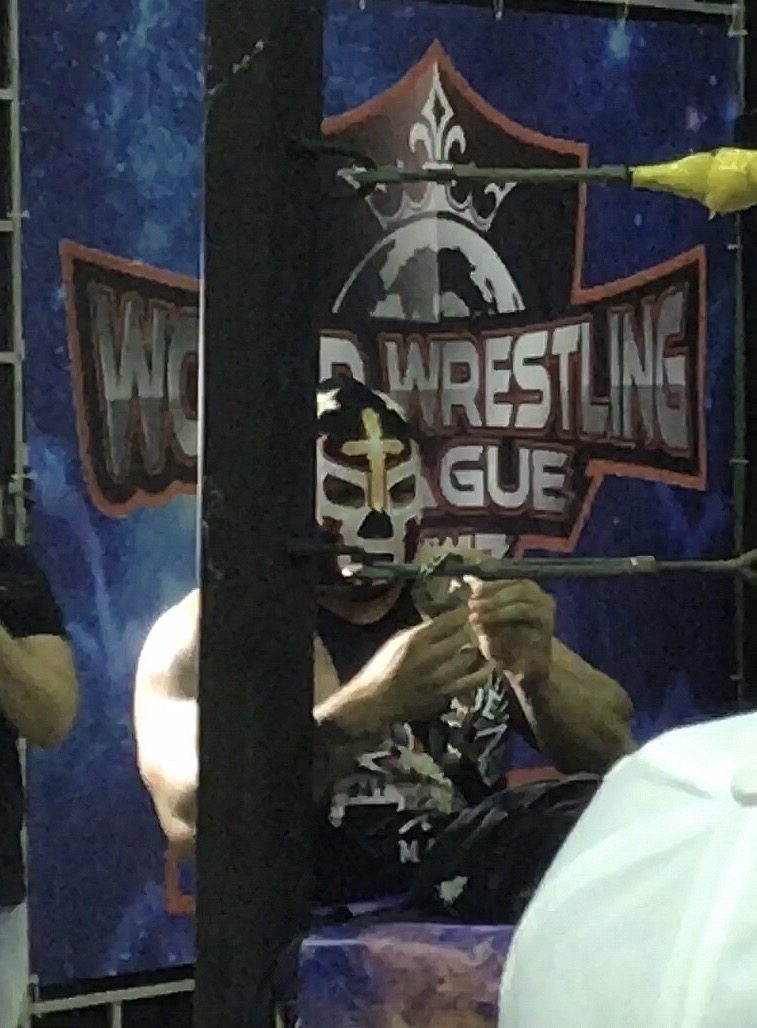
The blessing of El Nazareno consisted on randomly appearing to help his allies. Exemplified here by releasing Tabú during a liberation match.

The character of El Nazareno was born after fans used the term (literally meaning "the Nazarene") as a non-swearing insult in WWL's social media to criticize his jump to CWS, going viral and inspiring a number of memes superimposing his face in religious icons. Concepción adapted this nickname by adopting cross-themes gear and making use of angelic music while making promos and employing the catchphrase El Nazareno los bendice (lit. "El Nazareno blesses you"). In anticipation to his return, WWL began playing Ismael Rivera's eponymous religious salsa song in segments with the Westside Mafia, with some of its lyrics becoming additional catchphrases, in particular those making reference to "tak[ing] care of your friends" and "extend[ing] your hand to the fallen".

On July 15, 2017, 450 defeated Joseph Cruz "J.C." Navarro in a first contenders match, stole the WWL World Heavyweight Championship belt and rebranded himself the Mecha Wolf 450, also turning on the Westside Mafia.

After Concepción relocated to Florida, he began making appearances in the independent circuit of the region. He also debuted a parallel character, Dark/Evil Nazareno (wearing the same uniform, but with a version of the mask that was completely black), which allowed him to perform as a heel under the same character. On January 10, 2018, this dark persona interfered on behalf of Angel Fashion in a Pro Wrestling 2.0 match against 450, leading to the creation of a stable known as The Holy Fashion along Carlos Cupeles. On February 9, 2018, Concepción made his debut for Cleveland Knights Championship Wrestling (CKCP), helping Fashion win the "Chase for the Case" six-man ladder match.

At CKCW, the remaining two members of Tercera Generación became part of The Holy Fashion. The group began a list of "Hall of #Blessed" wrestlers, which compiled those laid out by the group. "Sensacional" Roger Díaz and Justin Dynamite (Jomar Merced) were the inaugural members. After weeks of stalking 450, Fashion faced him at Pro Wrestling 2.0 on February 13, 2018, where Nazareno and Cupeles joined the latter to make the former the "latest inductee" into the Hall of #Blessed by jumping him.

== Championships and accomplishments ==
- International Wrestling Association
  - IWA Caribbean Heavyweight Championship (1 time)
  - IWA Junior Heavyweight Championship (1 time)
  - IWA World Tag Team Championship (1 time) – with Spectro
  - IWA Puerto Rico Heavyweight Championship (1 time)
- World Wrestling Council
  - WWC Puerto Rico Heavyweight Championship (1 time)
  - WWC World Tag Team Championship (2 times) – with William De la Vega
  - WWC Television Championship (1 time)
- World Wrestling League
  - WWL World Heavyweight Championship (1 time)
- New Wrestling Stars
  - NWS Tag Team Championship (1 time) – with Livewire
  - NWS Television Championship (1 time)
- Championship Wrestling Association
  - CWA Tag Team Championship (1 time) – with Tabú
- Puerto Rico Wrestling Association
  - PRWA World Heavyweight Championship (1 time)
- International Championship Wrestling Alliance
  - 1st Grand Prix Cup – with Team Puerto Rico (Savio Vega, Mecha Wolf 450, Chicano Cotto, Mr. Big and Roxxy)
