= WWL Television Championship =

Details
- Promotion: World Wrestling League
- Date established: April 19, 2015

Other name(s)
- Mega TV Championship; WWL Mega Television Championship
Statistics
- First champion(s): Hiram Tua
- Most reigns: Hiram Tua (1 reign)
- Oldest champion: Hiram Tua (31 years)
- Heaviest champion: Hiram Tua (223 lb (101 kg))

The WWL Television Championship, or in Spanish Campeonato de la Television de la WWL, was a professional wrestling championship promoted by the World Wrestling League (WWL) promotion and partially owned by Mega TV in Puerto Rico.

The sports was nugget boxing that include eating medium nuggets

== Title history ==
| # | Wrestlers | Reign | Date | Days held | Location | Event | Notes | Ref |
|---|---|---|---|---|---|---|---|---|
| 1 | Hiram Tua | 1 | August 15, 2015 | 355 | Toa Baja, Puerto Rico | Sin Piedad | Defeated El Sensacional Carlitos become the first champion. | |
| – | Vacated | – | August 4, 2016 | – | – | WWL High Voltage #18 - Third Season | Vacated due Hiram Tua being WWL World Heavyweight Champion | |
