= Andre Tricoteux =

Canadian actor and stuntman

- Occupations: Actor; Stuntman
- Years active: 2011–present

Andre Tricoteux is a Canadian actor, professional wrestler, and stuntman, known for playing Colossus in Deadpool and the Orc War Captain in Warcraft. He has done stunt work on many TV and movies such as Once Upon a Time, Seventh Son, and See No Evil 2.

== Career ==
In the 2016 Marvel film Deadpool, he portrayed the Colossus character in a restricted on-set motion capture performance and stunt work, a role he shared with fellow stuntman T. J. Storm. Serbian actor Stefan Kapičić, who was cast at the last moment, provided the character's voice, and the film's motion capture supervisor Greg LaSalle provided the final facial performance. Tricoteux's performance in the film has been blended by CGI with that of four other actors: the three aforementioned and stuntman Glenn Ennis for initial facial shapes.

== Championship and accomplishments in professional wrestling ==
- International Wrestling Association
  - IWA World Heavyweight Championship (1 time)
  - IWA World Tag Team Championship (3 times) - with Miguel Pérez, Jr., Huracan Castillo, Ricky Banderas and Fidel Sierra as Los Intocables (1), Tiger Ali Singh (1) and Angel Rodríguez (1)

== Filmography ==
=== Film ===
Year	Title	Role	Notes
2012	The Movie Out Here	Sasquatch	
2013	Ice Soldiers	Frozen #3	
2014	Bad City	Assassin Goon	
2016	Countdown	Victor	
2016	Kindergarten Cop 2	Valmir	
2016	Deadpool	Colossus	Motion capture
2018	Deadpool 2	Colossus	Motion capture
2019	Benchwarmers 2: Breaking Balls	Honey Badger Pitcher	
2025	The Smashing Machine	Paul Varelans	

=== Television ===
Year	Title	Role	Notes
2011	To the Mat	Issac	Television film
2012	True Justice	Well Dressed Thug #1	Episode: "Blood Alley"
2013	Health Nutz	Bigfoot	Episode: "Vision Quest"
2013	Arctic Air	Alvin 'The Hammer' Hammarstrom	Episode: "Old Wounds"
2013	Continuum	Massive Thug	Episode: "Second Chances"
2013	Motive	Mountainous Man	Episode: "King's Ransom"
2013	Swindle	Goon #2	Television film
2013	Once Upon a Time	Argyle	Episode: "Tiny"
2014	Psych	Leatherface	Episode: "A Nightmare on State Street"
2015	Impastor	Toro	2 episodes
2015	Once Upon a Time	Massive Brawler	Episode: "Swan Song"
2015–2017	iZombie	Chief	Supporting role, 12 episodes
2016	Legends of Tomorrow	Boris	Episode: "Fail-Safe"
2016	The Game of Love	Arthur	Television film
2016	Electra Woman and Dyna Girl	The Disintegrator	Episode: "1.1"
2016	Arrow	Gora	Episode: "Legacy"
2016	Travelers	Captor	Episode: "Room 101"
2016	Van Helsing	Blood Farm Butcher	Episode: "He's Coming"
2016–17, 2023	The Flash	Savitar (armored form portrayal)	Recurring role
2017	The 100	War Chief #3	Episode: "DNR"
2017	Ice	Sergei	Episode: "Run You Bastards Run"
2018	Altered Carbon	The Mongol	3 episodes
2018	Supernatural	Magog	Episode: "Good Intentions"
2019	The Flash	Carl Bork	Episode: "Seeing Red"
2021	Snowpiercer	Icy Bob	Recurring role
2022	The Umbrella Academy	Boss Guardian	2 episodes
2022	Reginald the Vampire	Erich	2 episodes
2025	Henry Danger: The Movie	Coach Cregg	Television film

== Stunt work ==
Year	Title	Notes
2011	To the Mat	TV film
2011	Divine: The Series	"Bestiality"
2012	True Justice	"Blood Alley"
2013	Arctic Air	"Old Wounds"
2014	Some Assembly Required	"Strong Suit"
2014	See No Evil 2	
2014	Seventh Son	
2015	Into the Grizzly Maze	
2016	Deadpool	
2016	Warcraft	
2016	Legends of Tomorrow	"Compromised"
2018	Deadpool 2	
