= Hiram Tua =

Puerto Rican professional wrestler (born 1983)

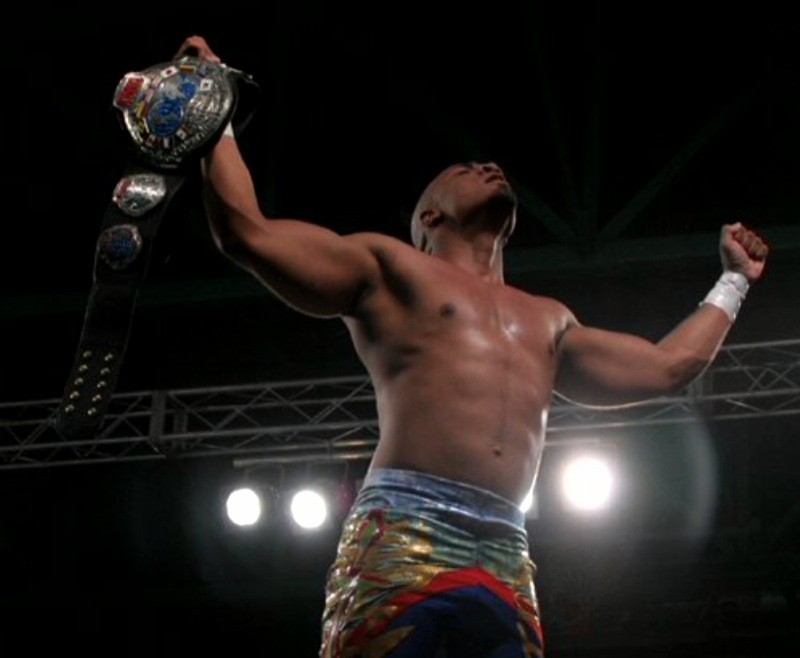
- Hiram Mulero as the IWA Undisputed World Heavyweight Champion.

Personal information
- Born: Hiram Mulero; 16 September 1983 (age 43) Guaynabo, Puerto Rico

Professional wrestling career
- Ring name(s): Airan Anoai Tua; Hiram Tua; La Sombra(WWC); Tua
- Billed height: 6 ft 0 in (1.83 m)
- Billed weight: 260 lb (120 kg)
- Billed from: Guaynabo, Puerto Rico
- Trained by: José Díaz; Shane Sewell
- Debut: 2002
- Retired: 2024

Hiram Mulero (September 16, 1983) is a retired Puerto Rican professional wrestler. He is best known under his ring name, Hiram Tua, which he has used in several of Puerto Rico's promotions, including the International Wrestling Association, the World Wrestling Council and the World Wrestling League.

== Career ==
=== Early career ===
Mulero began his career in the independent promotion, Caribbean Wrestling Association. His first gimmick being that of a Samoan wrestler named Airan Anoy Tua. It was in this company that he won his first two titles, the CWA Cruiserweight Championship and the CWA Tag Team Championship with Roger Díaz. Continuing to perform in the independent circuit, Mulero entered the Extreme Wrestling Organization, where he first adopted the ring name Hiram Tua. His gimmick was the "owner of space", which emphasized aerial style wrestling. He also wrestled in the Puerto Rico Wrestling Association.

Mulero debuted in the International Wrestling Association on November 4, 2005, wrestling against Díaz in a losing effort. His first win took place a month after in a mixed tag team match. He wrestled Díaz twice during the following month, losing both contests. Mulero's first singles victory was over Armando Gorbea on January 14, 2006. Throughout the rest of the year he continued competing on alternate dates, challenging cruiserweights with mixed results. On November he entered a tournament for the IWA Cruiserweight Championship, but was eliminated in the opening round.

At Histeria Boricua 2007, Mulero was teamed with Díaz in a 3 on 3 match. Due to their ability to perform flashy aerial maneuvers, Jack Melendez decided to book them as a tag team that eventually became known as Los Aereos. Mulero occasionally wrestled in single contests even winning the Hardcore Championship on January 27, 2007, despite being mostly a tag team contender. On February 3, 2007, the team was officially named following a contest with then main eventer Joe Bravo. The following week, Mulero dropped the title. In April 2007, Los Aereos entered a feud with NWA Tag Team Champions, Los Luchas. Their subsequent feud was with top heel faction La Revolución Dominicana, which saw them unsuccessfully challenging for the IWA World Tag Team Championship in a ladder match. In a rematch, Los Aereos won the titles. Los Aereos continued rising in the tag team division, eventually entering a feud with the Naturals, dropping the belts. After failing to regain them from the Naturals, they defeated Los Dueños de la Malicia, Dennis Rivera and Noel Rodríguez, for the first contenders spot, but once again lost the titular match.

On October 13, 2007, he won the Cruiserweight Championship, holding on to it until leaving it vacant. The angle with La Malicia continued until early 2008, when Los Aereos left the IWA following an event that broke the promotion's administration in two conflicting bands, Miguel Peréz against Mario Savoldi. Los Aereos remained inactive for several months, until Tua joined EWO for a brief stint. On October 31, 2008, they debuted in the World Wrestling Council. The team entered a short feud against The Texas Outlaws upon arriving in the promotion, which saw them lose a first contenders match for the WWC World Tag Team Championship. This was followed by a series of contests with Gorbea and Ricky Reyes, which saw both teams trade victories. Upon defeating Gorbea and Reyes in a rubber match, Los Aereos went on to unsuccessfully challenge Thunder and Lightning for the championship.

On July 26, 2009, Mulero turned on Díaz, adopting a heel persona known as "El Dueño del Espacio" Hiram Tua, a throwback to his EWO gimmick. He entered a feud with Díaz before joining Orlando Colón in a stable, which saw both of them portray a single character, La Pesadilla. Following Aniversario 2009, where Colón lost his mask, the two created a tag team that became known as Los Traidores. He continued to feud with Díaz, eventually being revealed as La Sombra. However, their partnership was short lived and Los Aereos eventually reunited as a face team. This was followed by a feud against Idol Stevens and King Tonga Jr., who had won the titles. Los Aereos won the Championships from them on April 10, 2010, dropping them back a three weeks later. The final match of this angle took place at Aniversario 2010, in which they were victorious. Subsequently, both were separated in order to pursue single storylines. Mulero feuded with José "Black Pain" Torres and Hideo Saito for the WWC Caribbean Heavyweight Championship, but eventually faded from WWC programming.

Mulero's next appearance was in the IWA, where he challenged Noel Rodríguez, losing an IWA Puerto Rico Heavyweight Championship eliminatory. Immediately afterwards, he entered a feud with Eric Pérez, which extended for several months. On April 2, 2011, Mulero defeated Pérez to win his first IWA Undisputed World Heavyweight Championship. Mulero then joined a group led by Savio Vega, who invaded WWC's Aniversario 2011 in the first interpromotional angle between both companies. He held on to the title for four months, eventually entering a feud against a stable known as the Academy. At Summer Attitude, he dropped the title to Academy member and undefeated Intercontinental Champion, Chris Angel. Later in the same event, he was among the wrestlers that defended the IWA from a counter-invasion from WWC's talent. A month later, Mulero was fired from the IWA by Miguel Pérez as part of a storyline. He subsequently explained this action, stating that he intended to retire from the Puerto Rican circuit in order to pursue an international wrestling career. Mulero completed previous compromises with independent companies EWO and New Professional Wrestling to conclude his local run. He was ranked in the 150th slot in Pro Wrestling Illustrated's 2011 PWI 500, making him the highest rated wrestler that competed exclusively in Puerto Rico that year.

On November 11, 2011, he made his foreign debut for East Coast Professional Wrestling. Mulero won this contest, going over Billy Daly. He returned to ECPW on April 13, 2012, participating in a three-way match, he picked the pinfall following a shooting star press after throwing his second opponent outside the ring. In early 2012, Mulero became tied to Amaro Productions, who went on to form a stable that also included Díaz. He abandoned his local retirement for one night, briefly reforming Los Aereos in a charity card named "Un Junte para la Historia". Mulero returned to New Jersey in autumn, wrestling there for National Pro Wrestling Superstars on October 26–27, 2012. On his first date, he teamed with Frankie Flow to face a team known as Absolutely Latino. Mulero defeated "The Latin Lover" Chachi in a singles match the following night. On June 8, 2013, Mulero performed in La Guerra, an event held prior to the Puerto Rican Day Parade, defeating Bestia 666.

=== World Wrestling League (2014-2016) ===
Mulero returned to local wrestling on December 13, 2014 on Navidad Corporativa, aiding El Sensacional Carlitos, by attacking Mr. 450, but later turning on Carlitos by attacking him. On January 6, 2015 in Guerra De Reyes, he interfered in a match between El Sensacional Carlitos and Mr. 450, costing Carlitos the match by pushing the ladder and throwing Carlitos of the top rope.

On August 15, 2015, "El Sensacional" Carlitos and "El Dueño del Mundo" Hiram Túa faced off to determine the First Mega Champion of the TV of the WWL. Both Carlitos and Túa, launched their entire arsenal of movements. Túa ended up winning and being the First Mega Champion of the TV of the WWL.

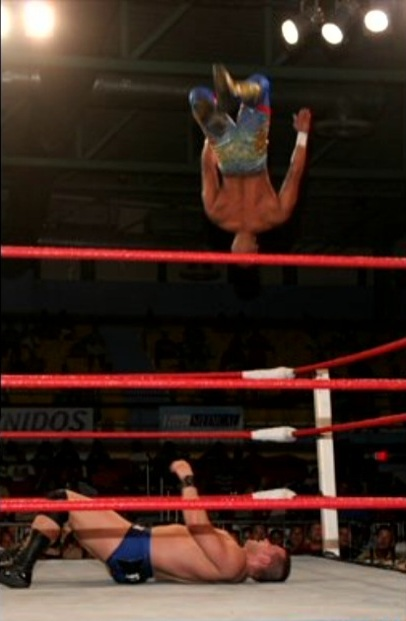
Tua performing the shooting star press on Pérez.

=== Health issues (2018) ===
On September 26, 2018, Mulero announced that he was forced to take "Time Off" from Wrestling due to "health issues" which forced him to cancel appearances for CWA and CKCW among others. A reunion of Los Aéreos scheduled for November would mark his final match. On October 3, 2018, Mulero (who had back problems preceding his career).

With his future in wrestling still uncertain, Mulero saw action at Hugo Savinovich's MysterManía winning an obstentible opportunity for the Wrestling Superstar World Tag Team Championship along Star Roger. Mulero entered a hiatus while recovering from his back injury. His prognosis improved, allowing him to return to the ring.

==== CWA, OIL/GZW (2021–2024) ====
Tua got medically cleared and joined the CWA full-time.

Tua restarted his rivalry against Star Roger, formerly known as El Sensacional Carlitos, which ended up with them teaming up to challenge the CWA Tag Team Champions, Los Fugitivos Alejandro Niche Marrero and Wilfredo Lynx Rivera. On CWA Aniversario 11, on July 20, 2019, The Aereos, Hiram Tua and Star Roger defeat Los Fugitivos and became the new CWA Tag Team Champions.

Mulero joined Organización Internacional de Lucha (OIL) as part of a heel group known as Black and White. When the administration splintered and several left to join Ground Zero Wrestling (GZW) in 2022, he was among the talents that migrated there, being placed in a feud with heavyweight champion Bryan Idol.

On Saturday, April 29, 2023, the CWA and CWS presented the first Tomás Marin "El Martillo" cup at the San Juan Bosco auditorium in Cantera, Santurce, where Tua returns to the CWA and defeats "El Mejor" Dimes to become CWA Champion for the first time.

=== Health and Career (2024 -present) ===
Hiram Tua continued to consolidate his legacy in the wrestling industry during 2024. Among his most notable achievements of the year, Hiram Tua took the initiative to share his knowledge and experience by announcing the creation of content focused on Puerto Rican wrestling. This new project sought to highlight local stories and talent, offering a unique perspective of one of the most respected wrestlers on the island.

In September 2024, Hiram announced that he would be pausing his career due to the need for spine surgery. He had his "last match" at CWA's Anniversary event against one of his notable opponents, Noel Rodríguez. After being medically cleared he announced his retirement from wrestling by doctors recommendation.

== Championships and accomplishments ==
- International Wrestling Association (Puerto Rico)
  - IWA Undisputed World Heavyweight Championship (1 time)
  - IWA World Tag Team Championship (1 time) - with Sensacional Carlitos
  - IWA Hardcore Championship (2 times)
  - IWA Cruiserweight Championship (1 time)
- World Wrestling Council
  - WWC World Tag Team Championship (1 time) - with Sensacional Carlitos
- Caribbean Wrestling Association
  - CWA World Heavyweight Championship (1 time)
  - CWA Puerto Rico Heavyweight Championship (1 time)
  - CWA Cruiserweight Championship (1 time)
  - CWA Tag Team Championship (1 time) - with Sensacional Carlitos
- Championship Wrestling School
  - CWS World Championship (1 time)
- United Wrestling Alliance
  - UWA World Heavyweight Championship (1 time)
- World Wrestling League
  - WWL World Heavyweight Championship (1 time)
  - WWL Television Championship (1 time)
- Wrestling Superstar
  - WS World Tag Team Championship (1 time)
- Pro Wrestling Illustrated
  - PWI ranked him # 150 of the 500 best singles wrestlers of the PWI 500 in 2011
  - PWI ranked him # 430 of the 500 best singles wrestlers of the PWI 500 in 2010
  - PWI ranked him # 439 of the 500 best singles wrestlers of the PWI 500 in 2009
  - PWI ranked him # 474 of the 500 best singles wrestlers of the PWI 500 in 2008

== See also ==
- Professional wrestling in Puerto Rico
