= Carlos Cotto =

Puerto Rican professional wrestler (born 1980)

Chicano
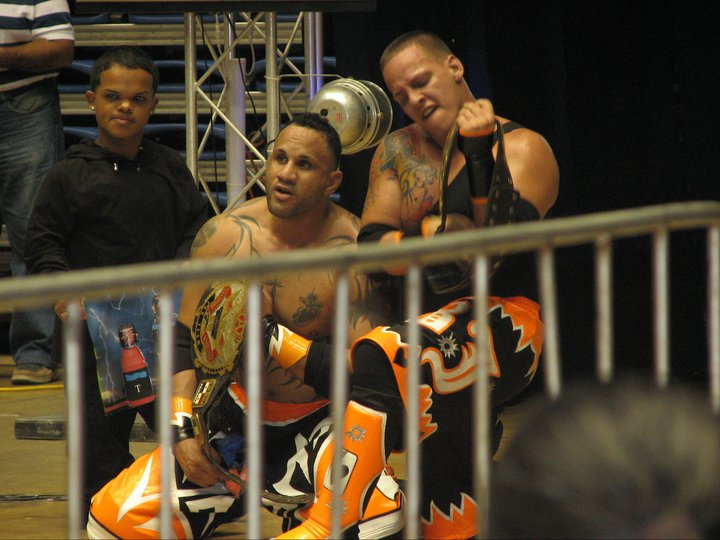
- Cotto (left) as WWC World Tag Team Champion

Personal information
- Born: Carlos Omar Cotto Cruz; February 13, 1980 (age 46) Caguas, Puerto Rico

Professional wrestling career
- Ring name(s): (El) Chicano; El Ilegal; El Chico Ilegal; El Pelotero
- Billed height: 6 ft 0 in (183 cm)
- Debut: 2000

Carlos Omar Cotto Cruz (born February 13, 1980) is a Puerto Rican professional wrestler and boxer. As a wrestler, he perform under the alias of El Chicano and has performed mostly for the International Wrestling Association and the World Wrestling Council. While performing for the first, Cotto became the only person to win all eligible championships, later becoming a Universal Heavyweight Champion in the second. Locally, he has held the main title of a promotion (or World/Universal Heavyweight Championship) nine times. Abroad, Cotto has worked for AAA in 2010 (as El Ilegal) and Consejo Mundial de Lucha Libre in 2016.

A member of the Cotto boxing family, Cotto became involved in the sport late in his life. After competing in few amateur fights, Cotto became a professional and joined Miguel Cotto Promotions.

== Professional wrestling career ==
=== International Wrestling Association (2000–2007) ===
After one appearance in an independent company in Puerto Rico where he worked as "El Pelotero", Cotto debuted in the International Wrestling Association in 2000. His ring name of "El Chicano" originated when German Figueroa compared his traits to that of a Chicano. Early in his career, he was part of a stable named "Lucha Libre 101", which was led by Eric Perez.

On June 11, 2005, Cotto defeated Shane Sewell and Ricky Banderas in a three-way, in the process winning the IWA World Heavyweight Championship for the first time. With this victory, he became the first wrestler to win a championship in every division within the company.

=== World Wrestling Council, return to IWA (2007) ===
During this timeframe, Cotto conversed with Moody Jack and decided to appear in the World Wrestling Council. This decision was based on economic necessity. Cotto informed Jumping Jeff Jeffrey of his intention of abandoning the IWA, who supported the choice and accompanied him to the promotion. They arrived as "La Rabia", after one week in WWC, Cotto decided to return to the IWA, citing that he felt uncomfortable with the promotion's work ethics and feel.

On January 6, 2009, Cotto was booked to defend the championship against Total Nonstop Action's Legends Champion, Booker T, in a "champion vs. champion" contest. The contest was part of an annual event titled "Histeria Boricua". The conclusion came when Cotto inverted a "Book End" attempt, scoring a pinfall victory. On February 14, 2009, the promotion held a special event named "Noche de Campeónes". In this card, Cotto defended the Undiputed Championship against Samoa Joe. During the final stages of the fight, Noel Rodríguez intervened, injuring the referee. Both wrestlers continued performing, with Cotto scoring a pinfall victory after reverting a finisher and receiving the count from a substitute referee.

=== Return to WWC (2009–2010) ===
Late 2009, Chicano and his partners "Los Fugitivos de la Calle" (El Niche, Lynx, El Cuervo) appeared on a television segment of WWC program "Las Superestrellas de la Lucha Libre" making an alliance with his old friend and former member of "Lucha Libre 101" Bryan Madness. Chicano and Bryan won the WWC Tag Team Champion in Euphoria 2010 by pinfall over Thunder & Lightning with the intervention of El Cuervo. Afterwards, the Fugitivos turned on Chicano who teamed with BJ and won the WWC World Tag Team Championship twice. He left the promotion in November 2010, to work with AAA in Mexico.

=== AAA (2010) ===
On November 7, 2010, Cotto debuted in AAA as a masked character known as "El Ilegal", being booked to win a six-man tag team match, alongside Damián 666 and Halloween by applying a new finishing move. His entrance to the company was explained in a storyline, where he was brought in by Dorian Roldán Peña to join La Sociedad, a major faction trying to take over the promotion. In his second match, he was teamed with Hernandez against Joe Líder and Nicho el Millonario, gaining the pinfall. At Guerra de Titanes, both teams unsuccessfully challenged Los Maníacos for the AAA World Tag Team Championship in a ladder match.

=== Return to IWA and EWO (2011–2013) ===
On March 5, 2011, Cotto returned to IWA in a live event alongside Abbad and the WWC Women's Champion La Morena. The tag team was dissolved in the middle of a feud, due to an injury to his partner. Cotto continued to feud for the tag team championships, but once the opportunity took place, he was removed, in order to introduce Savio Vega's student, Diego de Jesús. He was subsequently fired as part of a storyline, returning masked under his El Illegal character. He continued wrestling unmasked in the independent circuit, even challenging for the Extreme Wrestling Organization's heavyweight title under his common character, in a contest that ended in a double disqualification. Cotto went on to pursue a feud with the Intercontinental and Undisputed Heavyweight Champion, Chris Angel. He was initially awarded the Intercontinental belt and Angel's undefeated record, but the result was revoked due to external interference from a second masked "Illegal" and an unclean pin. In a rematch, he won the Championship in a two on one contest, pinning Phillip Davian following an attack from a third masked wrestler. Zona 101 reunited on December 10, 2011, in Caribbean Wrestling Federation, an independent promotion based in the south region of Puerto Rico, where he teamed with one half of the CWF Tag Team Champions. The following week, the team was booked over Dennis Rivera and Noel Rodríguez. On December 17, 2011, Cotto won the EWO World Heavyweight Championship, only to be interrupted by IWA president Miguel Pérez. This was in response to a previous confrontation between both, that occurred following a benefit card where Cotto wrestled and defeated Mesias. After defending the title at Tierra de Nadie 2012, Pérez once again reclaimed his contract. This was followed by confrontations in IWA's Histeria Boricua and Kaos & Odissey, which expanded to include EWO's CEO, Richard Rondón, as well. On February 25, 2012, following more intervention from the IWA, Cotto issued a challenge to end the conflict, an unification match for the EWO World Heavyweight Championship and IWA Undisputed World Heavyweight Championship. On March 1, 2012, the challenge was accepted by Pérez and Rondón in a backstage segment. At Clash of the Titans, Cotto lost the EWO World Championship, losing to a masked wrestler only known as "Bonecrusher", whom he had defeated to win this belt and had since gained the IWA Undisputed Heavyweight Champion. In this match, a new angle was launched that involved him being involved in "friendly" confrontations with the other members of his stable, which was continued in the next event, Payback.

In April 2012, Cotto was involved in an angle in a small independent promotion, the Champion Wrestling Association, in which the CWA Tag Team Champions, a group known as "La Nueva Era", interrupted an homage being held to recognize his career, resulting in a faceoff in which he was joined by Carlos Cupeles. At the CWA's fourth anniversary event, he and Cupeles unsuccessfully challenged for the tag team titles. On May 26, 2012, Pérez made a face turn when Rondón insulted his father, which resulted in the entirety of Zona 101, led by Cotto, joining him and becoming part of Team IWA.

=== Second return to WWC (2013-present) ===
He returned to WWC early in 2013. At WWC 40 Aniversario, Chicano and Abbad won the WWC Tag Team Championship. On October 25, 2014, at Aniversario 41, Chicano defeated Gilbert to win the WWC Puerto Rico Heavyweight Championship. However, he lost the title against Gilbert on November 8, 2014. On December 6, 2014, Chicano regained the title. However, at Hora de la Verdad, on January 24, 2015, Chicano lost the title against Ricardo Rodriguez. However, Chicano regained the title on February 21, 2015, but he lost the title again seven days later against a member of La Revolución. On April 4, 2015, Chicano defeated Carly Colón to win the WWC Universal Championship. On August 2, 2015, after he lost the WWC Universal Championship, he get his left elbow injured, his return is uncertain.

== Boxing career ==
Carlos Cotto
Personal information
- Nickname: "El Chicano"
- Nationality: (Puerto Rico) Puerto Rican
- Born: Carlos Cotto Cruz; February 13, 1980 (age 46) Caguas, Puerto Rico
- Height: 5 ft 11 in (180 cm)
- Weight: Heavyweight

Boxing career
- Reach: 78 in (198 cm)
- Stance: Orthodox

Boxing record
- Total fights: 10
- Wins: 8
- Win by KO: 5
- Losses: 1
- Draws: 1

During his youth, Cotto trained to become a boxer along Orlando Piñero and family members Evangelista and Miguel Cotto. But he abandoned boxing in order to pursue a career as a wrestler, keeping this undisclosed to the general public. However, while taking his daughter Doris to a boxing gym he began training himself and soon became interested in resuming his involvement in the sport. On August 24, 2012, Cotto announced that he was officially preparing to begin a parallel career as a boxer. He joined the municipal gymnasium of Aguas Buenas, where he began training along Efraín Román, Armando Alamo, Jonuel Tapia and one of his cousins, Abner Cotto. After entering the municipality's amateur tournament, he noted a desire to challenge Gerardo Bisbal before entering the professional ranks, where he intended to pursue the latter's brother, Victor Bisbal. Cotto made his amateur debut on September 28, 2012, defeating his opponent by RSC after 30 seconds of the first round, also earning the recognition of "Most Spectacular Fight" of the night.

However, his involvement and remuneration in professional wrestling led to the intervention of the Federacion Puertorriquena de Boxeo Aficionado (lit. "Puerto Rico Amateur Boxing Federation"), who pressured him to leave the amateur rankings. Héctor Soto of H2 Entertainment, soon recruited him to join Miguel Cotto Promotions. In his professional debut, Cotto defeated fellow debutant Eliezer Jiménez by technical knockout in a round, being accompanied to the ring by Rivera and Pérez, among other wrestling colleagues. He won his second fight in the same fashion, this time over Jesús J. González. By wrestling in a WWC card held at Arroyo the same night (successfully retaining the Puerto Rico Heavyweight Chsmpionship over Samsom Walker), Cotto became the first individual on record to box and wrestle on the same date.

He passed the first round for the first time in his third fight, defeating Víctor Pizarro by technical knockout in the second. Cotto's next outing concluded in dramatic fashion, after his opponent remained in the canvas for minutes after being knocked out. On August 31, 2013, he won a disqualification after his opponent, Jimmy Suárez, ignored multiple warning following a series of rabbit punches, prompting referee Luis Pabón to stop the contest. Cotto then made his first fight outside Puerto Rico, defeating Sandy Antonio Soto by unanimous decision in four rounds. His next fight was transitional and featured Los Boricuas as his entrance act, with him scoring a technical knockout over a win-less Óscar Adorno. Cotto repeated the same feat accomplished before, traveling from Caguas to Bayamón in order to compete in a WWC card later in the night. In his second fight at the Dominican Republic, he tied with Carlos Peña via majority draw.

This result lead to several changes in Cotto's career, who moved to the Villa Fontana Gym in Carolina, Puerto Rico where he trained under Gerardo Sánchez Jr., dropping 35 pounds and working on his technique. His next fight was against Suárez, who was returning from a suspension issues due to his actions in the previous fight, but managed to surprise him and score a first-round technical knockout. Cotto was frustrated by the result, arguing that he was hit with several rabbit punches and that referee Ramón Peña failed to notice them, immediately beginning the negotiations for a third fight between them. Colón Sr., who accompanied him to the ring along Juan and Dennis Rivera, argued that the sudden weight loss had in fact affected his performance, but the finish was described as "controversial" in the media. On April 4, 2015, Cotto defeated Suárez by split decision. This was the same night that he won the WWC Universal Heavyweight Championship, arriving to the wrestling card via helicopter.

=== Professional boxing record ===
8 Wins (5 knockouts, 3decisions), 1 Losses (1 knockout, 0 decisions), 1 Draw
| Res. | Record | Opponent | Type | Rd., Time | Date | Location | Notes |
| Win | 8-1-1 | (Puerto Rico) Jimmy Suárez | SD | 6 (6), 3:00 | 2015-04-04 | Palacio de los Deportes, Mayagüez, Puerto Rico | |
| Loss | 7-1-1 | (Puerto Rico) Jimmy Suárez | TKO | 1 (6), 2:31 | 2015-02-07 | Coliseo Guillermo Angulo, Carolina, Puerto Rico | Cotto's camp argued that he was injured by consecutive rabbit punches, leading to a rubber match. |
| Draw | 7-0-1 | (Dominican Republic) Carlos Peña | MD | 4 (4), 3:00 | 2014-07-19 | (Dominican Republic) Coliseo Pedro Julio Nolasco | |
| Win | 7-0-0 | (Puerto Rico) Óscar Adorno | TKO | 1 (6), 2:37 | 2014-02-01 | Coliseo Roger L. Mendoza, Caguas, Puerto Rico | |
| Win | 6-0-0 | (Dominican Republic) Sandy Soto | UD | 4 (4), 3:00 | 2013-11-09 | Coliseo Pedro Julio Nolasco, La Romana, Dominican Republic | |
| Win | 5-0-0 | (Puerto Rico) Jimmy Suárez | DQ | 1 (4), 2:08 | 2013-08-31 | Coliseo Roger L. Mendoza, Caguas, Puerto Rico | Due to repetitive rabbit punches; Suárez was suspended by the Puerto Rico Boxing Commission for ignoring multiple warnings. |
| Win | 4-0-0 | (Puerto Rico) Irvin Torres | SD | 1 (4), 0:40 | 2013-07-13 | Coliseo Samuel Rodríguez, Aguas Buenas, Puerto Rico | |
| Win | 3-0-0 | (Puerto Rico) Víctor Pizarro | TKO | 2 (4), 1:45 | 2013-04-27 | Coliseo Roger L. Mendoza, Caguas, Puerto Rico | |
| Win | 2-0-0 | (Puerto Rico) Jesús J. González | TKO | 1 (4), 1:27 | 2013-02-23 | Coliseo Cosme Beitia Sálamo, Cataño, Puerto Rico | |
| Win | 1-0-0 | (Puerto Rico) Eliezer Jiménez | TKO | 1 (4), 0:37 | 2012-12-22 | Coliseo Roger L. Mendoza, Caguas, Puerto Rico | |

== Personal life ==
Cotto is related to several combat sport athletes and instructors, including boxers such as 4 Division World Champion, Miguel Cotto and Pan American medalists Abner and José Miguel Cotto. Other relatives within the sport include Miguel Cotto Sr. and trainer Evangelista Cotto. He was married with Poison Ivy, who performed alongside him in professional wrestling. Cotto has three children, Doris, Victor Javier and Darielys Paola. Outside of wrestling, Cotto has worked as a supervisor in a private security company. He also acted as a songwriter and musician, releasing an album named Zona Illegal and some singles with the rapper Ranking Stone & other new talents, also got an antagonist role in a local movie project "Cita a ciegas" (unknown release date).

== Championships and accomplishments ==
- Action Wrestling Associated
  - AWA World Heavyweight Championship (1 time)
- Borinquen Sports Promotions
  - BSP World Maximus Heavyweight Championship (1 time)
- Entertainment Wrestling Organization
  - EWO World Heavyweight Championship (1 time)
- International Wrestling Association
  - IWA Undisputed World Heavyweight Championship (6 times)
  - IWA Intercontinental Championship (7 times)
  - IWA Puerto Rico Heavyweight Championship (1 time)
  - IWA Hardcore Championship (6 times)
  - IWA World Junior Heavyweight Championship (1 time)
  - IWA World Tag Team Championship (10 times) – with Slash Venom (3), Dennis Rivera (2), Craven (1), Stefano (1), "Jumping" Jeff Jeffrey (1), Bryan Madness (1) and Lightning (1)
  - 1st Grandslam Champion
  - José Miguel Pérez Memorial Cup (2008)
- Pro Wrestling Illustrated
  - PWI ranked him #167 of the top 500 singles wrestlers in the PWI 500 in 2008
- South Carolina Championship Wrestling
  - SCCW Heavyweight Championship - (1 time)
- World Wrestling Council
  - WWC Universal Heavyweight Championship (2 times)
  - WWC Puerto Rico Championship (9 times)
  - WWC World Tag Team Championship (10 times) – with BJ (2), Bryan Madness (1), Idol Stevens (1), Abbad (1), Xix Xavant (2), Lightning (2) and Mike Nice (1)
  - WWC Television Championship (1 time)
- Xtreme Wrestling Entertainment
  - XWE Heavyweight Championship (1 time)
