= IWA Christmas in PR =

Annual professional wrestling event promoted in Puerto Rico

Christmas in PR
- IWA Christmas in PR logo
- Promotions: IWA; WWF; WWL
- Nicknames: CiPR
- Other names: IWA/WWF Christmas in PR; WWL Christmas in PR
- First event: Christmas in PR 1999
- Event gimmick: Season closer

Christmas in PR is an annual wrestling event promoted in Puerto Rico by the International Wrestling Association (IWA-PR). It was also briefly held by the World Wrestling League (WWL) during the former's period of inactivity.

It is held every December as the Puerto Rican wrestling year's-end show. IWA held most of its events on weekends visiting various cities around Puerto Rico, the main night of the tour would be held Saturdays most of the times in Bayamón, Puerto Rico

== WWF/IWA Christmas in PR 1999 ==
The 1999 inaugural IWA Christmas in PR was held at two locations: At the "Roberto Clemente Coliseum" in San Juan, Puerto Rico on December 15, 1999 and at "Edwin "Puruco" Nolazco Coliseum" in Coamo, Puerto Rico on December 16, 1999

WWF/IWA Christmas in PR - San Juan (1999)
#	Results	Stipulations
1	Apolo Dantes defeats Shawn Stasiak	Singles Match
2	The Headhunters defeated Jesus Cristobal and "El Lobo" Andy Anderson	Tag Team Match
3	Ivory defeated Tori	Singles Match
4	Savio Vega defeated Prince Albert	Singles Match
5	The Hardy Boyz (Matt Hardy and Jeff Hardy) defeated Ricky Santana and Ricky Banderas	Tag Team Match
6	Miguel Perez and Road Dogg defeated Gangrel and Edge	Tag Team Match
7	Kane and The Godfather defeated The Undertaker and Viscera	Tag Team Match

WWF/IWA Christmas in PR - Coamo (1999)
#	Results	Stipulations
1	Rastaman defeats Jesus Cristobal	Singles Match
2	Apolo Dantes & Huracan Castillo defeat Mideon & Taka Michinoku	Tag Team Match
3	Tori defeats Ivory	Singles Match
4	Val Venis defeats Shawn Stasiak	Singles Match
5	Savio Vega defeats Prince Albert	Singles Match
6	Road Dogg defeats Miguel Perez by Count Out	Singles Match
7	The Hardy Boyz (Jeff Hardy & Matt Hardy) defeat Ricky Banderas & Ricky Santana	Tag Team Match
8	Kane & The Godfather defeat The Undertaker & Viscera	Tag Team Match

== IWA Christmas in PR 2000 ==
The 2000 event was held at three locations: On December 15 at the "Acropolis de Manati" in Manatí, Puerto Rico, On December 16 at "Cancha Pepin Cestero" in Bayamón, Puerto Rico and On December 17, in Guayama, Puerto Rico

IWA Christmas in PR - Manatí (2000)
#	Results	Stipulations
1	Ninjitzu defeated Andrés Borges	Singles Match
2	Rastaman defeated Taka Michinoku by default	Singles Match
3	Andy Anderson defeated Rastaman	Singles Match
4	Super Crazy (c) defeated Sean Hill	Singles Match for the IWA World Junior Heavyweight Championship
5	Chicky Starr defeated El Paparazzi	Singles Match
6	Faraon Zaruxx & Victor the Bodyguard defeated Sons of Sin ("Lobo" Andy Anderson & Vyzago)	Tag Team Match
7	Pain defeated Hombre Dinamita	Singles Match
8	Huracan Castillo Jr & Ricky Banderas defeated Miguel Perez & Apolo	Tag Team Match
(c) – refers to the champion(s) heading into the match

IWA Christmas in PR - Bayamón (2000)
#	Results	Stipulations
1	Rastaman defeated Ninjitzu	Singles Match
2	Huracán Castillo Jr. defeated Super Medico	Singles Match
3	Sean Hill defeated El Paparazzi	Loser Must Wear a Dress Match
4	Hombre Dinamita defeated Pain	Singles Match
5	Sons of Sin ("Lobo" Andy Anderson and Vyzago) (c) defeated Starr Corporation (Chicky Starr and Victor "The Bodyguard") by disqualification.	Tag Team match for the IWA World Tag Team Championship
6	Steve Corino (c) defeated Shane the Glamour Boy	Singles Match for the ECW World Heavyweight Championship
7	Miguelito Pérez defeated Ricky Banderas by disqualification	Singles Match
8	Tajiri defeated Super Crazy	ECW Style Match
9	Apolo, Miguelito Pérez, Hombre Dinamita, Chicky Starr, Victor The Bodyguard and Glamour Boy Shane defeated Huracán Castillo, Ricky Banderas, Pain, Vyzago, Andy Anderson and Ninjitzu	"Final Battle" Twelve-Man Tag Team match
(c) – refers to the champion(s) heading into the match

IWA Christmas in PR - Guayama (2000)
#	Results	Stipulations
1	Sexy Sensual (Andrés Borges & Sean Hill) defeated El Paparazzi & Ninjitzu	Tag Team Match
2	Steve Corino defeated Super Crazy	Singles Match
3	Faraon Zaruxx defeated El Chicano, Eric Alexander and Vyzago	Four Way Match
4	Huracán Castillo Jr. defeated Apolo	Singles Match
5	Hombre Dinamita defeated Pain	Singles Match
6	Starr Corporation (Chicky Starr and Víctor "The Bodyguard") defeated Rastaman & Super Medico	Tag Team Match
7	Miguelito Pérez defeated Ricky Banderas by disqualification	Singles Match
8	Shane the Glamour Boy vs Tajiri ended in a No Contest	Singles Match

== IWA Christmas in PR 2001 ==
The 2001 event was held at Cancha Pepín Cestero in Bayamón, Puerto Rico on December 15, 2001 and other unknown locations.

IWA Christmas in PR (2001)
#	Results	Stipulations
1	Dragon Makabe defeated Tommy Diablo and El Diabólico	Three Way Match
2	Huracán Castillo defeated Fujita	Singles Match
3	El Chicano and Eric "El Gladiador"Alexander defeated Luke Williams and Pulgarcito	Tag Team Match
4	Eddie Guerrero defeated Super Crazy	Singles match
5	"El Lobo" Andy Anderson (c) defeated Tajiri	Singles match for the IWA World Junior Heavyweight Championship
6	Chicky Starr and Víctor The Bodyguard (c) defeated Agente Bruno and Pain	Tag Team match for the IWA World Tag Team Championship
7	Ricky Banderas defeated Tommy Dreamer	Singles match
8	Apolo (c) defeated Shane the Glamour Boy	Singles match for the IWA World Heavyweight Championship
(c) – refers to the champion(s) heading into the match

== IWA Christmas in PR 2002 ==
The 2002 event was held at four locations: (presumably) On December 12, 2002 in Manatí, Puerto Rico, (presumably) On December 13, 2002 in Cayey, Puerto Rico, On December 14, 2002 at "Guillermo Angulo Coliseum" in Carolina, Puerto Rico and On December 15, 2002 in San Germán, Puerto Rico.

IWA Christmas in PR - Carolina (2002)
#	Results	Stipulations
1	El Paparazzi defeated El Diabólico	Singles Match
2	Agente Bruno defeated Makoto	Singles Match
3	Andy Anderson defeated Justin Sane, Anarchy and Stefano	Four Way Elimination Match
5	Huracán Castillo defeated Slash Venom	Barbed Wire Match
4	Abyss (with Angel R,) defeated Eric Alexander (c)	Singles Match for the IWA Intercontinental Championship
6	Ricky Banderas (c) defeated El Chicano	Hardcore Match for the IWA Hardcore Championship
7	Shane the Glamour Boy defeated Rey Fénix (with Angel Rodríguez & Avbriela)	Singles Match
8	Savio Vega & Miguelito Pérez. defeated Apolo & Shane the Glamour Boy	Tag Team Match to determine the General Manager
(c) – refers to the champion(s) heading into the match

IWA Christmas in PR - San Germán (2002)
#	Results	Stipulations
1	El Paparazzi defeated Damián	Singles Match
2	El Diabólico & Makoto defeated Stefano & Mr. Maniac	Tag Team Match
3	Agente Bruno defeated Dragon Lord	Singles Match
4	Anarchy & Eric Alexander vs. El Chicano & Justin Sane went to a draw	Tag Team Match
5	Slash Venom defeated Huracán Castillo	Extreme Rules Match
6	Víctor the Bodyguard & Apolo defeated Miguelito Pérez. & Rey Fénix	Tag Team Match
7	Shane the Glamour Boy defeated Abyss (c)	Singles Match for the IWA Intercontinental Championship
(c) – refers to the champion(s) heading into the match

== IWA Christmas in PR 2003 ==
The 2003 event was held at the "Rubén Rodríguez Coliseum" in Bayamón, Puerto Rico on December 13, 2003 and other unknown locations

IWA Christmas in PR - Bayamón (2003)
#	Results	Stipulations
1	Súper Átomo defeated Paparazzi	Singles Match
2	Stefano defeated Tommy Diablo	Singles Match
3	Los Boricuas (Huracán Castillo & Miguel Pérez Jr.) (c) defeated Power Company (Dave Power & Dean Power) and Craven &Chicano	Three Way Elimination Tag Team Match for the IWA World Tag Team Championship
4	Blitz (c) defeated Homicide	Singles Match for the IWA World Junior Heavyweight Championship
5	Apolo & Slash Venom defeated Vampiro & Ricky Banderas	Steel Chair & Baseball Bat on a Pole Tag Team Match
6	Shane the Glamour Boy defeated Bison	Singles match for the vacant IWA World Heavyweight Championship
7	Invader #1 defeated Savio Vega	Barbed Wire Match
8	Víctor The Bodyguard & Chet Jablonski defeated Ray González & Abyss	Tag Team Match
(c) – refers to the champion(s) heading into the match

== IWA Christmas in PR 2004 ==
The 2004 event was held at two locations: on December 17, 2006 at "Juan Pachín Vicens Auditorium" in Ponce, Puerto Rico and on December 9, 2006 at "Cancha Pepín Cestero" in Bayamón, Puerto Rico

IWA Christmas in PR - Ponce (2004)
#	Results	Stipulations
1	Golden Boy & Ivy defeated Hound Dog & La Tigresa	Mixed Tag Team Match
2	Kasey James defeated Stefano	Singles Match
3	Tonga Kid defeated Chet Jablonsky	Singles Match
4	Spectro defeated Anarchy	Singles Match
5	Slash Venom & El Chicano vs Mike Modest & Donovan Morgan (with El Profe) went to a draw	Tag Team Match
6	Invader #1 defeated Ray González by disqualification	Lumberjack Match
7	Rikishi defeated Bison (with José Chaparro)	Singles Match
8	Los Hermanos en Dolor (Shane the Glamour Boy & Ricky Banderas) & Savio Vega defeated La Artillería Pesada (Thunder & Lightning) & Billy Gunn	Six Man Tag Team Match

IWA Christmas in PR - Bayamón (2004)
#	Results	Stipulations
1	Stefano & Ivy defeated Just Perfect & La Tigresa	Mixed Tag Team Match
2	Blitz defeated Golden Boy (c)	Ladder Match for the IWA Junior Heavyweight Championship
3	Tonga Kid defeated Anarchy	Singles Match
4	Slash Venom & El Chicano defeated Mike Modest & Donovan Morgan (with El Profe)	Tag Team Match
5	Spectro defeated Billy Gunn (with El Profe)	Singles Match
6	Los Hijos de la Oscuridad (Vampiro & Ricky Banderas) defeated Bison & Chet Jablonsky (with El Profe)	Tag Team Match
7	Shane the Glamour Boy defeated Ray González (c) (with José Chaparro)	Singles Match for the IWA World Heavyweight Championship
8	Rikishi defeated Kasey James (with El Profe)	Singles Match
9	La Artillería Pesada (Thunder & Lightning) (c) defeated Invader #1 & Savio Vega	Tag Team Match for the IWA World Tag Team Championship
(c) – refers to the champion(s) heading into the match

== IWA Christmas in PR 2005 ==
The 2005 event was held at the Pepín Cestero Court in Bayamón, Puerto Rico on December 17, 2005.

- Golden Boy & Super Mark defeated Spectro & Exxus
- Intercontinental Champion Noriega defeated Mr. Big
- Tag Team Champions Neo & Montana defeated (La Cruzz del Diablo) El Diabólico & Cruzz
- Hardcore Champion Slash Venom defeated Trailer Park Trash
- Chicano vs Heavyweight Champion Savio Vega with Invader #1 as special referee went to no contest
- Ray González defeated Apolo
- Junior Heavyweight Champion Carlitos defeated Hiram Tua, Tommy Diablo & Blitz in a Fatal Four Way Match
- Thunder & Lightning defeated Ricky Banderas & Vampiro

== IWA Christmas in PR 2006 ==
The 2006 event was held at four locations: on December 7, 2006 at "Acrópolis de Manatí" in Manatí, Puerto Rico, On December 8, 2006 at "Polideportivo Los Caobos" in Ponce, Puerto Rico, On December 9, 2006 at "Cancha Pepín Cestero" in Bayamón, Puerto Rico and on December 10 at "Coliseo de San Sebastián" in San Sebastián, Puerto Rico.

IWA Christmas in PR - Manatí (2006)
#	Results	Stipulations
1	"El Sensacional" Carlitos defeated Bolo The Red Bulldog	Singles Match
2	Bull Bronsky defeated Vértigo	Singles Match
3	Cruzz defeated "El Rabioso" Blitz	Singles Match
4	Moxx Moxley defeated Hiram Tua	Singles Match
5	Ray González, El Chicano & Jumpin' Jeff Jeffrey defeated Mikael Judas, El Diabólico & El Bacano	Six-man Tag Team Match
6	Tommy Diablo & Amazona defeated Super Mark & La Morena	Mixed Tag Team Match
7	Shane the Glamour Boy defeated Lightning (with Ray González as Special Referee)	Singles Match

IWA Christmas in PR - Ponce (2006)
#	Results	Stipulations
1	"El Sensacional" Carlitos & Amazona defeated Super Mark & Morena	Mixed Tag Team Match
2	Bull Bronsky defeated Angel	Singles Match
3	Moxx Moxley (with Rockin' Randy) defeated Tommy Diablo	Singles Match
4	Joe Bravo defeated El Diabólico	Singles Match
5	Hiram Tua defeated Bolo the Red Bulldog	Extreme Rules Match
6	Mikael Judas defeated Shane the Glamour Boy	Hangman Horrors Match
7	Cruzz defeated Mr. Big	Caribbean Strap Match
8	El Chicano & Jumpin' Jeff Jeffrey defeated El Diamante Dominicano & Lightning (with El Bacano)	Tag Team Match

IWA Christmas in PR - Bayamón (2006)
#	Results	Stipulations
1	Angel (c) defeated Hiram Tua, Bolo The Red Bulldog, Carlitos, Moxx Moxley, Tommy Diablo, and Johnny Styles	Seven Man Scramble 24/7 Match for the IWA Hardcore Championship
2	Joe Bravo defeated Bull Bronsky by disqualification.	Singles Match
3	Black Rose defeated La Morena	Singles Match
4	Super Mark defeated Mr.Big	Singles Match
5	Cruzz defeated El Diabólico	Singles Match
6	Blitz defeated Amazona	Tournament Final match for the IWA Extreme Cruiserweight Championship
7	Bison defeated Mikael Judas (with Orlando Toledo) by disqualification	Singles Match
8	El Bacano and El Diamante Dominicano defeated El Chicano and Jumpin' Jeff Jeffrey (c)	Ladder Tag Team match for the IWA World Tag Team Championship
9	Glamour Boy Shane defeated Ray González (c) and Lightning	Three Way match for the IWA World Heavyweight Championship
(c) – refers to the champion(s) heading into the match

IWA Christmas in PR - San Sebastián (2006)
#	Results	Stipulations
1	El Diabólico defeated Angel (c)	Hardcore Match for the IWA Hardcore Championship
2	Angel defeated El Diabólico (c)	Hardcore Match for the IWA Hardcore Championship
3	Bull Bronsky defeated Dark Angel	Singles Match
4	"El Sensacional" Carlitos defeated Bolo The Red Bulldog	Singles Match
5	Moxx Moxley defeated Hiram Tua	Singles Match
6	Cruzz defeated Mr. Big	Caribbean Strap Match
7	Tommy Diablo defeated Super Mark	Singles Match
8	El Chicano, Jumpin’ Jeff Jeffrey & Black Rose defeated El Bacano, El Diamante & Amazona	Mixed Six Man Tag Team Match
9	Lightning & Mikael Judas defeated "El Bufalo" Bison & Shane the Glamour Boy	Cage Tag Team Match
(c) – refers to the champion(s) heading into the match

== IWA Christmas in PR 2007 ==
The 2007 event was held at two locations: On December 15, 2007 at "Cancha Pepín Cestero" in Bayamón, Puerto Rico and on December 16, 2007 at "Dr. Pedro Albizu Campos Coliseum" in Yabucoa, Puerto Rico.

IWA Christmas in PR - Bayamón (2007)
#	Results	Stipulations
1	Bolo the Red Bulldog defeated Tommy D (c)	Hardcore Match for the IWA Hardcore Championship
2	Abbad defeated Superstar Romeo	Singles Match
3	Magoo vs. Shaka el Trokero went to a No Contest	Clothes Stripping Match
4	Shane the Glamour Boy defeated Ricky Vega	Singles Match
5	Los Aéreos (Hiram Tua & Carlitos) defeated Starr Corporation (Dennis Rivera & Noel Rodríguez (with Chicky Starr)	Ladder Tag Team Match to determine #1 Contenders to the IWA Tag Team Championship
6	Blitz (c) defeated Tim Arson (with Orlando Toledo) by disqualification	Singles Match for the IWA World Heavyweight Championship
7	Team 3D (Brother Ray & Brother Devon) defeated The Naturals (Andy Douglas & Chase Stevens) (c) (with Orlando Toledo) by disqualification.	Tag Team Match for the IWA World Tag Team Championship
8	Richard Rondón & El Chicano defeated Miguel Pérez & El Diamante by disqualification.	Tag Team Match
(c) – refers to the champion(s) heading into the match

IWA Christmas in PR - Yabucoa (2007)
#	Results	Stipulations
1	Bolo the Red Bulldog defeated Manny Magriz	Singles Match
2	El Bacano defeated El Diabólico	Singles Match
3	Richard Rondón defeated Noel Rodríguez	Singles Match
4	Los Auténticos (El Diamante & Ricky Vega) defeated Magoo & Manny Magriz	Tag Team Match
5	Abbad & Los Aéreos (Hiram Tua & Carlitos) defeated El Diabólico & The Naturals (Andy Douglas & Chase Stevens)	Six Man Tag Team Match
6	Richard Rondón & El Bacano defeated Dennis Rivera & Noel Rodríguez	Tag Team Match
7	Shane the Glamour Boy defeated El Diamante	Singles Match
8	Los Auténticos (Miguel Pérez & Ricky Vega) defeated El Chicano & Blitz	Tag Team Match

== IWA Christmas in PR 2008 ==
The 2008 event was held at two locations: On December 12, 2008 at "Raul Pipote Oliveras Coliseum" in Yauco, Puerto Rico and on December 13, 2008 at "Cancha Pepín Cestero" in Bayamón, Puerto Rico.

IWA Christmas in PR - Yauco (2008)
#	Results	Stipulations
1	Chris Joel & El Chicano defeated Noel Rodríguez (c) & Black Devil	Tag Team Match where the Winner wins the IWA Puerto Rico Heavyweight Championship
2	Cruzz defeated El Bacano	Singles Match
3	Joe Bravo (c) defeated El Diabólico	Singles Match for the IWA Intercontinental Championship
4	"El Bufalo" Bison Smith defeated Dr. Krush by disqualification	Singles Match
5	Dennis Rivera defeated KC James	Chains Match
6	Los Auténticos Boricuas (Savio Vega & Miguel Pérez) (c) vs. Los Árabes (Hardan Kadafi & Zaer Arafat) (with Imam Ali) went to a No Contest	Tag Team Match for the IWA World Tag Team Championship
(c) – refers to the champion(s) heading into the match

IWA Christmas in PR - Bayamón (2008)
#	Results	Stipulations
1	Barbie Boy defeated Raymond Sales	Singles Match
2	Niche & Joseph RPM defeated La Revolución Dominicana (Eli Rodríguez & Balbuena)	Tag Team Match
3	La Cruz del Diablo (Cruzz & El Diabólico) defeated La Revolución Dominicana (Joe Bravo & El Bacano) (with Balbuena)	Tag Team Match
4	Noel Rodríguez defeated KC James	Asian Death Match
5	Amazona (c) defeated Black Rose (with Génesis as Special Referee)	Singles Match for the IWA Women's Championship
6	Chris Joel defeated Ravishing Richard	Singles Match
7	Los Árabes (Hardan Kadafi & Zaer Arafat) (with Imam Ali) defeated Miguel Pérez Jr. & "El Bufalo" Bison Smith (c)	Tag Team Match for the IWA World Tag Team Championship
8	El Chicano (c) defeated Dennis Rivera	Goldmine Match for the IWA Undisputed World Heavyweight Championship
(c) – refers to the champion(s) heading into the match

== IWA Christmas in PR 2009 ==
The 2009 event was held at two locations: On December 11, 2009 at "Raul Pipote Oliveras Coliseum" in Yauco, Puerto Rico and on December 12, 2009 at "Cancha Pepín Cestero" in Bayamón, Puerto Rico.

IWA Christmas in PR - Yauco (2009)
#	Results	Stipulations
1	?? defeated Lynx	Singles Match
2	El Niche defeated ??	Singles Match
3	El Bacano defeated Jay Adonis	Singles Match
4	El Cuervo defeated Balbuena & Puma Jr.	Handicap Match
5	Noel Rodríguez defeated El Niche	Singles Match
6	El Diabólico defeated Rick Stanley	Singles Match
7	Savio Vega & Gilbert defeated ?? & ??	Tag Team Match
8	Gilbert vs El Diabólico	Singles Match
9	El Chicano defeated Joe Bravo by disqualification	Singles Match

IWA Christmas in PR - Bayamón (2009)
#	Results	Stipulations
1	Barbie Boy defeated Jay Adonis (c)	Singles Match for the IWA Women's Championship
2	Balbuena defeated ??	Singles Match
3	El Cuervo (c) defeated Lash, Mike Ícono and Empio	Fatal Four Way for the IWA Extreme Combat Division Championship
4	El Chicano defeated El Bacano (c)	Singles Match for the IWA Puerto Rico Heavyweight Championship
5	Los Árabes (Harrdam Kadafi & Zaer Arafat) defeated Los Fugitivos de la Calle (El Niche & Lynx) (c) and Los Nuevos Dueños de la Malicia (Noel Rodríguez & Rick Stanley)	Two out of Three Falls Three Way Tag Team Match for the IWA World Tag Team Championship
6	Joe Bravo defeated Dennis Rivera	Singles Match for an IWA Championship
7	Shane the Glamour Boy & El Diabólico defeated Savio Vega & Gilbert by disqualification	Tag Team Match
(c) – refers to the champion(s) heading into the match

== IWA Christmas in PR 2010 ==
The 2010 event was held at two locations: On December 3, 2010 at "Cancha de la Ponderosa" in Vega Baja, Puerto Rico and on December 5, 2010 at "Cancha Pepín Cestero" in Bayamón, Puerto Rico.

IWA Christmas in PR - Bayamón (2010)
#	Results	Stipulations
1	Jamrock defeated ??	Rumble match to determine #1 contender to the IWA Extreme Combat Division Championship
2	Átomo & Sónico (c) defeated The Academy (Jamal & Phillips)	Tag Team Match for the IWA World Tag Team Championship
3	Noel Rodríguez defeated Spectro (c)	Singles Match for the IWA Puerto Rico Heavyweight Championship
4	Chris Angel defeated Savio Vega	Singles Match for the vacant IWA Intercontinental Championship
5	Dennis Rivera (c) defeated Cruzz	Singles Match for the IWA World Heavyweight Championship
(c) – refers to the champion(s) heading into the match

== WWL Christmas in PR 2016 ==
WWL's Christmas in PR.

The World Wrestling League (WWL) brought back Christmas in PR in 2016, being the second historical IWA event to be hosted by the promotion, after Golpe de Estado. The event was held at the José "Pepín" Cestero Complex in Bayamón, Puerto Rico on December 17, 2016.

WWL Christmas in PR (2016)
#	Results	Stipulations
1	Excellent Martel, Justin Dynamite & Mark Davidson defeated The Bullying Crew (David Estilo, Johnson The Enforcer & Rodrigo Garcia)	Six Man Tag Team Match for the vacant WWL World Trios Championship
2	Deonna Purrazzo defeated Tasha Steelz	Singles Match
3	JC Navarro defeated Masato Xero & Damien Adams	Three Way Match
4	Dimes defeated Diamond Slash	Singles Match
5	Payatronic defeated El Niche	Singles Match to determine #1 Contender for WWL World Super Cruiserweight Championship
6	Abbadon & Khaos (c) (with Richard Rondon) defeated West Side Mafia (5to Elemento & Tabu)	Tag Team Match for the WWL World Tag Team Championship
7	Morgan defeated Manny Ferno	Singles Match
8	Vassago defeated Spectro	Singles Match
9	Prince Xander defeated Big Daddy Montes (c)	Singles Match for the WWL Americas Championship
10	Superstar Ash (c) defeated Mr. Big	Singles Match for the WWL World Heavyweight Championship
(c) – refers to the champion(s) heading into the match

== IWA Christmas in PR 2019 ==
The return of the event to its home promotion is scheduled to take place at the "Lauro Dávila Coliseum" in Toa Baja, Puerto Rico on December 14, 2019.

IWA Christmas in PR 2019
#	Results	Stipulations
1	El Profe defeated Waykiria by disqualification	Strip Clothing Away Match
2	Aiden Grimm defeated Spectro	Bounty Match
3	Puro Macho (JC Navarro and Dean Rose) defeated Drunken Express (Pupe Jackson and Excellent Martel)	Tag Team Championship Match
4	Electro (c) defeated Vassago vs. Jax vs. Noel Rodriguez	Four-way Match for the IWA Intercontinental Championship
5	Lightning defeated Joe Bravo	Singles Match
6	Manny Ferno vs. Chicano - No Contest	Last Man Standing Match
7	Savio Vega vs. Thunder - No Contest	Unsanctioned Singles Match
8	Mr. Big (c) defeated Monster Pain by disqualification	Singles Match for the IWA World Heavyweight Championship
(c) – refers to the champion(s) heading into the match

== IWA Christmas in PR 2021 ==
The event was not held in 2020, since government protocols prevented large gatherings and most of the professional wrestling promotions remained in hibernation. In its return, Christmas in PR 2021 was held at the "Emilio Huyke Coliseum" in Humacao, Puerto Rico on December 11, 2021. The card was bolstered by wrestlers brought in by the talent exchange between IWA-PR and Major League Wrestling (MLW), among them Danny Limelight of 5150.

IWA Christmas in PR 2021
#	Results	Stipulations
1	Manny Ferno (c) vs. Lightning and Mr. Big - No Contest	IWA Puerto Rico Heavyweight Title Three Way Match
2	Chicano defeats Mighty Ursus	IWA Puerto Rico Intercontinental Title Match
3	Danny Limelight & Savio Vega defeat The Owners Of Time (Leinord White & Nick Mercer) (c) by DQ	IWA Tag Team Championship Match
4	Aidem Grimm defeats Khriz Díaz	Submission Match
5	Niche defeats John Hawking	Singles match
6	Pupe Jackson defeats Jax Di Franco	Special challenge match
(c) – refers to the champion(s) heading into the match

== IWA Christmas in PR 2023 ==
This event was held on December 2, 2024 at the "Rafael G. Amalbert Coliseum" in Juncos, Puerto Rico.

IWA Christmas in PR 2023
#	Results	Stipulations
1	Drunken Express (Excellent Mantel & Pupe Jackson) (w/Kiko Navarro) defeat Doom Patrol (Cold & Death Warrant) (w/Krystal)	Copa Los Boricuas Semi Final Match
2	John Hawking (c) defeats Carlos Controversia (w/Fernando Tonos)	IWA Puerto Rico Intercontinental Title No Disqualification Match
3	John Hawking (c) defeats Jax Di Franco (w/Fernando Tonos)	IWA Puerto Rico Intercontinental Title No Disqualification Match
4	John Hawking (c) defeats Xavier Millet (w/Fernando Tonos)	IWA Puerto Rico Intercontinental Title No Disqualification Match
5	Azazel [Mask] defeats Ray Fonseca [Hair]	Mask Vs. Hair Match
6	La Industria (El Cuervo & Justin Cotto) defeat Faces Of Destiny (Jay Blake & Nick Mercer) (c)	IWA Puerto Rico Tag Team Title Three Way Tables, Ladders And Chairs X Match
7	Manny Ferno defeats Romeo (w/Fernando Tonos) (c)	IWA Puerto Rico Title Barbed Wire Match
8	Evie De La Rosa (c) defeats Gema and Nathalya Perez and Yaide	IWA Women's World Title Four Way Match
9	Mike Mendoza (c) defeats Khriz Diaz and Mr. Big	IWA Puerto Rico Heavyweight Title Three Way Match
10	Savio Vega defeats Pedro Portillo III (w/Fernando Tonos)	Globo De La Muerte Match
(c) – refers to the champion(s) heading into the match

== IWA Christmas in PR 2024 ==
This event was held on December 6, 2023 at the "Emilio Huyke Coliseum" in Humacao, Puerto Rico.

IWA Christmas in PR 2024
#	Results	Stipulations
1	2Hot4U (Cesar Aldea, Edrax & Oscar Benabe) (w/Daisy Lyn) defeat Dark Side Klan (Dark Scorpion & Vassago) & Jax Di Franco	Six Man Tag Team Match
2	Drunken Express (Excellent Mantel & Pupe Jackson) defeat Barbie Boy & Stefano	Tag Team Match
3	Bruce Wayans (c) defeats Johnny Blaze	CWC Title Match
4	La Fuerza Anarquista (El Atleta Manu & Romeo) (w/Xavier Millet) (c) defeat Faces Of Destiny (Jay Blake & Nick Mercer)	IWA Puerto Rico Undisputed World Tag Team Title Match
5	Evie De La Rosa (c) defeats Black Rose and Nathalya Perez	IWA Women's World Title Three Way Match
6	La Industria (El Cuervo & Justin Cotto) defeat Faces Of Destiny (Jay Blake & Nick Mercer) (c)	IWA Puerto Rico Tag Team Title Three Way Tables, Ladders And Chairs X Match
7	Mike Mendoza defeats Justin Cotto and Manny Ferno and Niche	Copa IWA Match
8	John Hawking (c) defeats Savio Vega	IWA Puerto Rico Heavyweight Title / IWA Puerto Rico Title / IWA Puerto Rico Undisputed Intercontinental Heavyweight Title Vs. Career Death Match
9	El Cuervo defeats Pedro Portillo III	Globo De La Muerte Match
(c) – refers to the champion(s) heading into the match

== See also ==
- Professional wrestling in Puerto Rico
- List of professional wrestling promotions
