= WWC Intercontinental Heavyweight Championship =

Details
- Promotion: World Wrestling Council (WWC)
- Date established: January 7, 1998
- Date retired: July 25, 1999
Statistics
- First champion: Pierroth Jr.
- Final champion: Pierroth Jr.
- Most reigns: Pierroth Jr. (4 times)
- Longest reign: Pierroth Jr. (347 days)
- Shortest reign: Glamour Boy Shane (22 days)

The WWC Intercontinental Heavyweight Championship was a title that was defended in the World Wrestling Council in Puerto Rico.

== Title history ==
Wrestler:	Reigns:	Date:	Place:	Notes:	Reference
Pierroth Jr.	1	January 7, 1998		Was Billed as champion when he returned to the company.	
Glamour Boy Shane	1	December 20, 1998	Guaynabo, Puerto Rico		
Pierroth Jr.	2	January 11, 1999	Boston, MA	Shane Sewell went to the WWF Funkin' Dojo expecting that he would be chosen, but he wasn't. To explain his absence the WWC invented a match in which Pierroth defeated Sewell.	
Glamour Boy Shane	2	January 23, 1999	Guaynabo, Puerto Rico		
Pierroth Jr.	3	February 20, 1999	Lajas, Puerto Rico		
Held-up after a title vs. title match between Intercontinental Champion Pierroth Jr. and Universal Champion Ray Gonzalez on March 27, 1999 in Guaynabo, PR.
Ray González	1	April 3, 1999	Guaynabo, Puerto Rico	Defeat Pierroth, in a rematch in a Hair vs Mask 2 of 3 falls for the WWC Intercontinental and Universal Heavyweight titles.	
Pierroth Jr.	4	June 1999?	Naucalpan, Mexico	Defeats González in rematch. On August 1, 1999, Pierroth lost the belt in Naucalpan, Mexico to Pirata Morgan and there it was billed as the IWRG Intercontinental heavyweight champion. WWC mentioned that he lost it to Tarzan Boy.(Oziel Toscano) as Toscano was working for them.	
Title was moved again to IWRG on July 25, 1999
