= Pierroth Jr. =

Mexican professional wrestler (born 1958)

Personal information
- Born: Norberto Salgado Salcedo; March 10, 1958 (age 68) Cuernavaca, Morelos, Mexico
- Family: El Hijo del Pierroth (son)

Professional wrestling career
- Ring name(s): Pierroth Jr. Pierroth; Comandante Pierroth
- Billed height: 1.76 m (5 ft 9 1/2 in)
- Billed weight: 97 kg (214 lb)
- Billed from: Puerto Rico
- Trained by: Elfego Silva; Gran Cochisse
- Debut: July 1, 1984; Cuernavaca, Morelos, Mexico
- Retired: June 17, 2008

Norberto Salgado Salcedo (born March 10, 1958) is a retired Mexican professional wrestler, primarily known under the ring name Pierroth Jr. Salgado made his professional wrestling debut on July 1, 1984, working as a masked wrestler, using the name Pierroth Jr. He lost his mask as a result of losing a Lucha de Apuestas ("bet match") to La Parka in 1998. In the late 1990s Pierroth became known as Comandante Pierroth or simply Pierroth, leader of a faction of pro-Puerto Rican wrestlers in CMLL known as Los Boricuas, notwithstanding him being born in Mexico. After suffering a stroke in November 2008 Salgado retired from professional wrestling. Several other wrestlers have used the name Pierroth or derivatives thereof over the years, with approval from Salgado, currently Pierrothito is the only wrestler actively using the name.

Over the years Salgado has worked for Mexican professional wrestling promotions Consejo Mundial de Lucha Libre (CMLL), Asistencia Asesoría y Administración (AAA), and International Wrestling Revolution Group (IWRG). He also undertook several tours with the Puerto Rico-based World Wrestling Council (WWC). In 1997 and 1998 Salgado made several appearances for the World Wrestling Federation (WWF) as part of the AAA/WWF talent exchange agreement between the two companies. While his ring name is the Spanish name of the Pierrot character from the Commedia dell'Arte tradition, his mask and tights were decorated with the Harlequin style black and yellow diamonds, a character that traditionally would oppose Pierrot in the plays.

== Professional wrestling career ==
Norberto Salgado trained under Elfego Silva and Gran Cochisse in the professional wrestling school associated with Arena Isabel in Cuernavaca, Morelos, Mexico. When Salgado made his in-ring debut July 1, 1984, he used the ring name "Pierroth Jr.", inspired by the wrestler Pierrot who was popular in Arena Isabel in the 1950s and 1960s despite not being related in any way. Salgado adopted the same black and yellow Harlequin diamond patterns for his mask and tights, ignoring the fact that in the Commedia dell'Arte tradition Pierrot was the rival of Harlequin and normally dressed in white. Early in his career he won both the Morelos Light Heavyweight Championship, and the Morelos Tag Team Championship alongside El Judio. The team with El Judio later led to a storyline feud between the two that resulted in Salgado winning his first Lucha de Apuestas ("bet match") of his career, in Mexico, the Lucha de Apuestas match is generally considered more important than championship matches.

=== Empresa Mexicana de Lucha Libre / Consejo Mundial de Luch Libre (1985–1995) ===
In 1985 Salgado, working as Pierroth Jr., began working occasional shows for Empresa Mexicana de Lucha Libre (EMLL; Spanish for "Mexican Wrestling Enterprise. Renamed Consejo Mundial de Luch Libre; CMLL in 1992), diving his career between Arena Isabel and EMLL in Mexico City. By 1988 he was a regular performer for EMLL, winning the Mexican National Light Heavyweight Championship from Halcón 78 on April 4, 1988. The reign lasted for 156 days until he lost it to Mogur on September 7. Pierroth Jr. became a two-time Mexican National Light Heavyweight Champion on January 12, 1990 with a victory over Mogur to win the title.

Pierroth Jr. began teaming with Bestia Salvaje on a regular basis in either late 1989 or early 1990, forming a team that the EMLL officials decided should win the Mexican National Tag Team Championship from then-champions Ángel Azteca and Atlantis. Their reign lasted 287 days, until they were defeated by Ángel Azteca and his new partner Volador. Afterwards he was put together with Jaque Mate and Masakre to form a trio called "Los Intocables" ("The Untouchables"). On March 22, 1992 Los Intocables defeated Los Infernales (MS-1, Pirata Morgan and El Satánico) to win the CMLL World Trios Championship. Los Infernales regained the championship on September 20, 1992, after which Los Intocables was broken up.

Pierroth Jr. defeated Jerry Estrada to become the second ever CMLL World Light Heavyweight Champion, starting a reign that would last 379 days. On April 2, 1993, Pierroth Jr.'s reign was ended by Dr. Wagner Jr. Pierroth Jr. won the mask of El Supremo as part of CMLL's "Year end" celebration on December 8, 1992. In early 1994 he won the Mexican National Heavyweight Championship from Rayo de Jalisco Jr.

=== Asistencia Asesoría y Administración / World Wrestling Federation (1995–1997) ===
Pierroth Jr. made his Asistencia Asesoría y Administración (AAA) debut in late 1995, joining several other CMLL workers who left the promotion to join their rival instead. In AAA, he became involved in a long-running feud with La Parka, which led Pierroth Jr. to his third reign as Mexican National Light Heavyweight Champion, which lasted 11 days. When Pierroth Jr. left CMLL he was still the Mexican National Heavyweight Champion and the Mexico City Lucha Libre commission allowed him to defend it in AAA after he joined the company. His reign lasted 574 days, until September 20, 1996, where he was defeated by Máscara Sagrada.

In mid-1996 Pierroth Jr. won two separate AAA championships; First he won the newly created AAA Campeón de Campeones Championship at Triplemanía IV-B as he won a torneo cibernetico elimination match to become the first champion. The following month he teamed with Villano III, Villano IV and Villano V to become the first holders of the Mexican National Atómicos Championship by defeating the team of Damián 666, Espectro Jr., Halloween and Karis la Momia in the finals of a tournament. The championship was later vacated when Los Villanos left AAA. Latin Lover defeated Pierroth Jr. to win the Campeón de Campeones Championship on February 15, 1997. He started his fourth and final reign as the Mexican National Light Heavyweight Champion by defeating Latin Lover for that championship.

In late 1996 AAA and the World Wrestling Federation (WWF; now called WWE) began working together, with AAA providing several luchadors that worked on WWF shows. Pierroth Jr. was paired up with Cibernético for the WWF shows, making their debut on the December 16, 1996 Raw is War show by defeating the New Rockers (Marty Jannetty and Leif Cassidy). That same night he defeated Matt Hardy for a Superstars taping which aired on December 22. The following night the team lost to Doug Furnas and Phil LaFon by disqualification when Cibernético pulled the referee out of the ring. The duo participated in the 1997 Royal Rumble match and were eliminated without any storylines. On March 10, 1997, Pierroth Jr. made his last WWF appearance, teaming with Heavy Metal and Pentagón to defeat the trio of Latin Lover, Héctor Garza and Octagón.

Salgado left AAA in mid-1997, while still holding both the Mexican National Light Heavyweight Championship, and began working on the independent circuit. At some point in 1998, he lost the championship to Máscara Sagrada who took it back to AAA.

=== Promo Azteca / International Wrestling Revolution Group / World Wrestling Council (1997–1999) ===
After Salgado's stint with AAA and the WWF ended, he began working for the newly formed International Wrestling Revolution Group (IWRG) based in Naucalpan, Mexico State. He became the inaugural holder of the IWRG Intercontinental Heavyweight Championship after winning a one-night tournament by defeating Black Magic on September 29, 1997. While he was champion for 672 days he only worked a few dates for IWRG between late 1997 and August 1, 1999, where he lost the title to Pirata Morgan.

On July 20, 1998, Pierroth Jr. lost a Lucha de Apuestas match to long time rival La Parka. He was forced to remove his black and yellow mask and reveal his real name, Norberto Salgado Salcedo, to the crowd in Nuevo Laredo, Tamaulipas.

In 1997 he made his first appearance for the Puerto Rican World Wrestling Council (WWC) promotion. When he returned to WWC in 1998 he was introduced as the WWC Intercontinental Heavyweight Champion, as a storyline way to introduce the championship without holding a tournament. The championship was featured as part of a long-running storyline with Glamor Boy Shane, with whom he traded the championship back and forth in early 1999. On March 27, 1999, Pierroth Jr. wrestled WWC Universal Champion Ray González to a draw, after which the championship was briefly vacated. Pierroth Jr. started his forth and final reign as WWC Intercontinental Heavyweight Champion on April 3, 1999, by defeating González in a rematch. The following day he also won the Universal Championship from González. His reign lasted 13 days, losing the championship back to González as part of their ongoing storyline. While Salgado had worked unmasked in Mexico since his Lucha de Apuestas loss to L.A. Park, still worked under a mask in Puerto Rico, until he lost a Lucha de Apuestas match to Ray González to end the storyline feud between the two.

=== Consejo Mundial de Lucha Libre (1999–2008) ===
==== Los Boricuas (1999–2003) ====
In 1999 Pierroth Jr. returned to CMLL after his extended stay in Puerto Rico ended. Upon his return Pierroth Jr. declared that he was a Boricua, or Puerto Rican, declaring the superiority of the Puerto Rican people over Mexicans. He began teaming with Gran Markus Jr., who also adopted the "Boricua" loyalty. Within weeks the duo became known officially as Los Boricuas and started to grow from a two-man team to a multi-man stable when they added the masked La Boricua and later on Veneno. At this point Pierroth Jr. took the nickname "El Comandate", acting like a dictator over the group, adding the female La Nazi as his personal body guard. In mid-2000 they added Violencia to the group, replacing El Boricua. In the months following the CMLL 68th Anniversary Show, Gran Markus Jr. left the group, with the storyline explanation that he was tired of being under Pierroth's command.

The culmination of the storyline between Los Boricuas and various defectors came on March 21, 2003, as Pierroth Jr. and Gran Markus Jr. faced off in main event of that year's Homenaje a Dos Leyendas show. In the end Pierroth defeated Gran Markus and as a result Gran Markus Jr. was shaved bald afterwards. The last remaining storyline for Los Boricuas saw Violencia leave the group, which at the time was basically himself and Pierroth and had Pierroth unmask Violencia at the CMLL 70th Anniversary Show. In subsequent months Pierroth began teaming on a regular basis with Vampiro and Tarzan Boy, ending the Los Boricuas faction in CMLL.

==== Late career (2004–2008) ====
Following the dissolution of Los Boriquas Pierroth Jr. and Vampiro began a long-running storyline feud with Los Hermanos Dinamita, especially Cien Caras and Máscara Año 2000. The storyline led to Pierroth and Vampiro losing a Lucha de Apuestas match in the main event of the 2004 Sin Piedad show, leaving both Pierroth and Vampiro totally bald. His last Lucha de Apuestas match took place on November 15, 2007, where he lost to L.A. Park and was once again shaved bald as a result.

== Retirement ==
Salgado was forced to retire from professional wrestling in November 2008 after suffering a debilitating stroke. The stroke left him struggling to walk without support, confining him to a wheelchair. Salgado has been honored on multiple occasions after his retirement. In 2009 wrestlers grouped together to organize Unido X Amistad ("United in Friendship") where the proceeds from the show went to Salgado since he could no longer work. Shows in his hometown of Cuernavaca also paid homage and support to Salgado. Salgado made a personal appearance at IWRG's 2013 Festival de las Máscaras show on August 11, 2013, where he was presented with a plaque and received applause as he put the black and yellow mask on.

== Name confusion ==
Over the years several wrestlers have used the name "Pierroth", or variations on that name in professional wrestling.

- Pierrot I / Pierrot II – not related to Pierroth Jr.
- Hijo del Pierroth (I) – Salgado's son, the name literally translates as "the son of Pierroth", sometimes worked as "Pierroth Jr." after Salgado became known a just Pierroth.
- Hijo del Pierroth (II) – after an injury to the original Hijo del Pierroth a new person used the name and mask, this is the wrestler formerly known as "Salsero" and now works as "Pierko el Boricua" after giving up the Pierroth name.
- Pierroth Jr. – Not a son of Salgado, originally portrayed by wrestler Rey Vikingo and later replaced by the original Mosco de la Merced, who now wrestles as X-Fly.
- Pierroth II – Isaac Pedro Gonzalez Nuñez lost his mask against El Canek Jr., now wrestles as El Anticristo.
- Pierrothito/Mini Pierroth – a Mini-Estrella who wrestles as a smaller version of Pierroth Jr.
- Comandante Pierroth – debuted for CMLL in May 2013, formerly known as Toro Blanco and Poder Mexica. Changed his ring name to "Bestia del Ring" in 2017.

== Professional wrestling persona ==
After Salgado adopted his militant "Comandante Pierroth" character he earned the nickname El Bocazas ("The Big Mouthed One") for his long, vitriolic speeches both in the ring and back stage. Salgado adopted an intricate submission hold called "La Pierrotina", created by the original Pierrot. To execute the hold Salgado held an opponent upside down, pushing their head down on his knee while simultaneously putting pressure on their legs.

== Championships and accomplishments ==
- Asistencia Asesoría y Administración
  - AAA Campeón de Campeones Championship (1 time)
  - Mexican National Atómicos Championship (1 time) – with Villano III, Villano IV and Villano V
  - Mexican National Light Heavyweight Championship (2 times)
- Consejo Mundial de Lucha Libre
  - CMLL World Light Heavyweight Championship (1 time)
  - CMLL World Trios Championship (1 time) – with Jaque Mate and Masakre
  - Mexican National Heavyweight Championship (1 time)
  - Mexican National Light Heavyweight Championship (2 times)
  - Mexican National Tag Team Championship (1 time) – with Bestia Salvaje
  - Copa de Oro 1995 – with Chicago Express
- Federacion Internacional de Lucha Libre
  - FILL Heavyweight Championship (1 time)
- International Wrestling Revolution Group
  - IWRG Intercontinental Heavyweight Championship (1 time)
- Kaoz Lucha Libre
  - Kaoz Heavyweight Championship (1 time)
- Mexican Independent circuit
  - Morelos Light Heavyweight Championship (1 time)
  - Morelos Tag Team Championship (1 time) – with El Judio
  - WWC Hardcore Championship (1 time, unrecognized) (Note: This was a title defended in Mexico falsely labelled as being sanctioned by the World Wrestling Council.)
- World Wrestling Council
  - WWC Intercontinental Heavyweight Championship (3 times)
  - WWC Universal Championship (1 time)
- Pro Wrestling Illustrated

- PWI ranked him #138 of the top 500 singles wrestlers in the PWI 500 in 1997

== Lucha de Apuesta record ==
Winner (wager)	Loser (wager)	Location	Event	Date	Notes
Pierroth Jr. (mask)	El Judío (mask)	Cuernavaca, Morelos	Live event	N/A	
Pierroth Jr. (mask)	Mr. Majestic (mask)	Cuernavaca, Morelos	Live event	N/A	
Pierroth Jr. (mask)	La Araña de Morelos (mask)	Cuernavaca, Morelos	Live event	N/A	
Pierroth Jr. (mask)	Zaratustra (mask)	Cuernavaca, Morelos	Live event	N/A	
Pierroth Jr. (mask)	Power Man (mask)	Monterrey, Nuevo León	Live event	N/A	
Pierroth Jr. (mask)	El Supremo (mask)	Mexico City	Juicio Final	1992	
Pierroth Jr. (mask)	Tigre Blanco (mask)	Guadalajara, Jalisco	Live event	N/A	
Pierroth Jr. (mask)	El Boricua (mask)	Mexico City	CMLL 62nd Anniversary Show (2)	September 29, 1995	
Pierroth Jr. (mask)	Kiss (mask)	Tijuana, Baja California	Live event	1998	
La Parka (mask)	Pierroth Jr. (mask)	Nuevo Laredo, Tamaulipas	Live event	July 20, 1998	
Pierroth Jr. (hair)	Power Man (mask)	Monterrey, Nuevo León	Live event	N/A	
Pierroth Jr. (hair)	Rostro Salazar (mask)	Reynosa, Tamaulipas	Live event	N/A	
Pierroth Jr. (hair)	American Destroyer (mask)	Nuevo Laredo, Tamaulipas	Live event	N/A	
Ray González (hair)	Pierroth Jr. (mask)	Guaynabo, Puerto Rico	Live event	1999	(Note: Pierroth Jr. kept wrestling with his mask on in Puerto Rico until he lost it there as well.)
Pierroth Jr. (hair)	Salsero (hair)	Nuevo Laredo, Tamaulipas	Live event	N/A	
Pierroth Jr. (hair)	Brazo de Plata (hair)	Mexico City	Live event	N/A	
Pierroth Jr. (hair)	Máscara Año 2000 (hair)	Mexico City	Live event	September 27, 2002	
Pierroth Jr. (hair)	Super Brazo (hair)	Cuernavaca, Morelos	Live event	October 17, 2002	
Pierroth Jr. (hair)	Super Brazo (hair)	Cuernavaca, Morelos	Live event	N/A	
Pierroth Jr. (hair)	Apolo Dantés (hair)	Mexico City	Live event	February 18, 2003	
Pierroth Jr. (hair)	Gran Markus Jr. (hair)	Mexico City	Homenaje a Dos Leyendas	March 31, 2003	
Pierroth Jr. (hair)	Cien Caras (hair)	Mexico City	Live event	June 20, 2003	
Pierroth Jr. (hair)	Brazo de Plata (hair)	Cuernavaca, Morelos	Live event	July 3, 2003	
Pierroth Jr. (hair)	Violencia (mask)	Mexico City	CMLL 70th Anniversary Show	September 19, 2003	
Universo 2000 (mask)	Pierroth Jr. (hair)	Mexico City	Sin Piedad	December 5, 2003	
Cien Caras and Máscara Año 2000 (hair)	Pierroth Jr. and Vampiro (hair)	Mexico City	Sin Piedad	December 17, 2004	
Pierroth Jr. (hair)	El Satánico (hair)	Puebla, Puebla	Live event	July 25, 2005	
Héctor Garza (hair)	Pierroth Jr. (hair)	Mexico City	Live event	August 19, 2005	
Dr. Wagner Jr. (mask)	Pierroth (hair)	Acapulco	Live event	April 19, 2006	
Tarzan Boy (hair)	Pierroth (hair)	Tlaxcala	Live event	December 30, 2006	(Note: The match also included Atlantis, Último Guerrero, Damián 666, Halloween, Mr. Águila, Pierroth II and Hijo de Pierroth.)
L.A. Park (mask)	Pierroth (hair)	Xalapa, Veracruz	Live event	November 15, 2007	
