= Ray González =

Puerto Rican professional wrestler (born 1972)

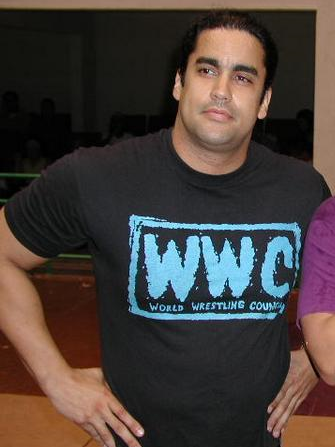
- González in 2000

Personal information
- Born: Ramón González Rivera; May 4, 1972 (age 54) Dorado, Puerto Rico
- Children: 4; including Ray González Jr.

Professional wrestling career
- Ring name(s): El Cóndor; Ray González; Rey Fénix
- Billed height: 6 ft 0 in (1.83 m)
- Billed weight: 280 lb (130 kg; 20 st)
- Billed from: Barrio Mameyal, Dorado
- Trained by: Jerry Mercado; Carlos Colón Sr.
- Debut: 1990

Ramón González Rivera (born May 4, 1972), better known by his ring name Ray González, is a Puerto Rican professional wrestler and businessman. He has performed in the World Wrestling Council (WWC) and International Wrestling Association (IWA) in Puerto Rico, Wrestling International New Generation (W*ING) in Japan, Consejo Mundial de Lucha Libre (CMLL) in Mexico, and the X Wrestling Federation (XWF) in the United States. He was the first recognized Latin American wrestler to hold the NWA World Heavyweight Championship.

González has won the WWC Universal Heavyweight Championship and the IWA World Heavyweight Championship on numerous occasions. He also held the NWA World Heavyweight Championship once, with his reign being the third for a Latin American-born wrestler by chronological order, but the first among those formally acknowledged by the National Wrestling Alliance (NWA).

He won WWC Universal Heavyweight Championship for the 22nd time on August 31, 2024, defeating Intelecto 5 Estrellas at the annual WWC Aniversario show and became the only wrestler in history that has won the WWC Universal Heavyweight Championship on 4 different decades.

== Early life ==
González became interested in professional wrestling by serendipity, being mesmerized by a match between Colón Sr. and Abdullah the Butcher that was casually being aired while he changed channels during his youth. This interest was not well received among his immediate family members, and he felt compelled to train covertly. However, a lack of adjacent wrestling academies (at the time) complicated this goal. While still in school, one of his classmates introduced González to a wrestler named Gerardo "Jerry" Quiñonez Mercado and he began training under him at a multi-sports gymnasium located in the Río Piedras district of San Juan. Still doing this on his own accord, he was forced to either hitchhike or board the Cataño Ferry to the locale. After González debuted in CSP, his family figured that he was wrestling, but left him to his own devices. During this timeframe he was influenced by both local (i.e., Colón Sr.) and international (i.e., Ric Flair) performers.

== Career ==
=== El Cóndor; AWF, CMLL, WING, CSP/WWC (1990–1998) ===
González debuted in Capitol Sports Promotions (CSP) in 1990 at age 18 as a masked cruiserweight named "El Cóndor", facing Joseph D'Acquisto, who performed locally as The Rochester Roadblock. He continued performing in the lowcard under this heel character for half a year, when he was unmasked and reintroduced as "Ray González". Under this new persona, González defeated Alex Porteau to win the CSP World Junior Heavyweight Championship on September 21, 1991. He vacated this title and began performing in the Americas Wrestling Federation, winning the light heavyweight title and the tag team championship along Tom Brandi. Parallel to this, Capitol reorganized into the World Wrestling Council after going bankrupt. On January 3, 1993, González defeated Takashi Okano in a Wrestling International New Generation tour. Two months later, Mastoshi Yosegi defeated him to retain the WWC Junior Heavyweight Championship. Back in WWC, González entered a feud against Louis Fabbiano, who was wrestling under the stereotypical villainous Arabic character, Mohammed Hussein, defeating his tag team partner. He teamed with Ricky Santana and unsuccessfully challenged for the WWC World Tag Team Championship after defeating a team known as "Solid Gold" twice. González also entered a battle royal but was eliminated. Two more attempts to win the championship along Santana and Ricky Steamboat ended in no contests. After losing to a team known as "The Dream Warriors", González began being pushed as a singles wrestler. He defeated Fabbiano three times, a jobber known as "Slammer" once and wrestling Mike Lozansky to a no contest. On July 8, 1993, González teamed with Carlos Colón to defeat Fabbiano and Dusty Wolfe.

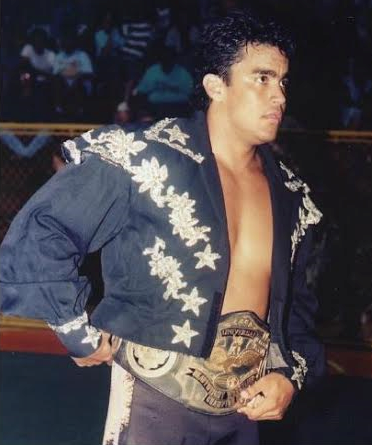
González as the WWC Universal Heavyweight Champion

He went on to team with Lozansky in an unsuccessful attempt to win the tag team championship from Fabbiano and Wolfe. González lost his following singles contests against Sione Havea Vailahi, Greg Valentine and a masked Steve Keirn, who was wrestling as "Doink the Clown". He formed a tag team with Ramón Álvarez, defeating Fabbiano and Santana, who had turned heel. On March 19, 1993, González defeated Valentine. He and Álvarez went on to defeat "The Bruise Brothers", Ron and Don Harris. Two days later, he won a disqualification over Dutch Mantell in a title match. On April 24, 1994, González defeated Valentine to win his first Universal Heavyweight Championship. He came in as replacement for an injured José Huertas González, who in reality was promoting a push for him backstage and convinced Colón to grant him the opportunity. Despite this, González's first reign was portrayed as an "underdog run", which saw him win mostly by being opportunist. This creative direction brought forward a lukewarm reception from the crowd, which motivated the creative team to give it back to Mantell. He then entered a feud with Eddie Gilbert winning twice by disqualification and losing once in the same manner. González interrupted this feud by defeating Glen Jacobs in a singles match. He teamed on with Álvarez to feud with Gilbert and Mantell, exchanging victories but failing to win the tag team championship. A fourth match between González and Gilbert ended in a double disqualification. On August 5, 1994, he teamed with Jesús Castillo Jr. against Gilbert and Mantell in a losing effort. Following this, González and Álvarez teamed again, wrestling The Moondogs, composed by Randy Colley and Larry Booker, to two double countouts. On August 11, 1995, he began a Consejo Mundial de Lucha Libre tour in Mexico by teaming with Juan Manuel Rodríguez and José Luis Casas to defeat Roberto Guttíerez Frias, José "Negro" Casas and Ultimo Dragon. He once again teamed with Casas Ruiz and Dr. Wagner win a match over Gutierrez Frias, Hector Garza and Ultimo Dragon. On August 25, 1995, González unsuccessfully challenged Gutierrez Frias for the NWA World Light Heavyweight Championship in a two out of three falls match.

=== La Familia del Milenio (1998–2002) ===
González remained working in the midcard, improving his skills and gathering support from the fanbase. This earned him more backstage supporters and a push was planned following Colón's purported retirement. A tournament for the vacant title was announced, supposedly with rounds taking place in several countries. However, this was a mechanism to trigger a push for González, who was receiving vignettes where Colón was depicted training him. Brandi was brought to WWC, claiming that he was the winner of the other tournament branch. On August 13, 1997, González defeated his former tag team partner to win the Universal Heavyweight Championship. During this reign he was heavily pushed, eventually entering a feud against David Sierra. The belt was held up following a match between them, but González recovered it two weeks later in a rematch. His next feud was precipitated randomly, when "El Nene" interrupted González during a promo, challenging him for the championship. However, this was used to advance the actual storyline, which began with Colón advising him not to accept the challenge. González dropped the title and a confrontation between both ensued after the match, with the differences between both growing during the following months. On May 19, 1998, González won a rematch and went on to turn heel by delivering a promo insulting Colón afterwards. He went on to create a stable known as La Familia del Nuevo Milenio or New Milenium Family and defeated every face wrestler in the midcard, which set up a match between both at Aniversario 1998. In the first night of this event, Colón won the Universal Heavyweight Championship, only to drop it back to González one day later in Mayagüez. He went on another successful midcard talent run and held the title until November 26, 1998, losing it to Shane Sewell, before recovering it four weeks later. On January 23, 1999, González dropped the title in a rematch against Colón, until it becomes vacant a month later. González brought in Pierroth, Jr along several Lucha Libre AAA World Wide (AAA) wrestlers to 'invade' the WWC, but the Mexican turned on him after claiming being tired of receiving orders. The first contest between them resulted in a double disqualification due to illegal tactics, with the Universal Heavyweight Championship being held up. On April 3, 1999, González won the title back in a hair vs. mask apuestas match, unmasking Pierroth. However, he dropped it in their next encounter. The feud came to a conclusion in a stipulation match, in which the loser would leave WWC, which was won by González. Shortly afterwards, Carly Colón began appearing in WWC events as a cameraman. González began teasing him, prompting another contest against Colón Sr., who won the championship after his son hit González with a shovel. On November 13, 1999, the title was held up due to outside interference, Colón regained it. González went on to defeat Colón Sr. and regain the championship in WWC's next event, while Carly Colón began his career entering a major push. Soon, both engaged in a feud, and Colón became the youngest Universal Heavyweight Champion by pinning him on January 29, 2000. González then began bringing in several wrestlers to wrestle Colón for the championship, initially including Álvarez and Hercules Ayala.

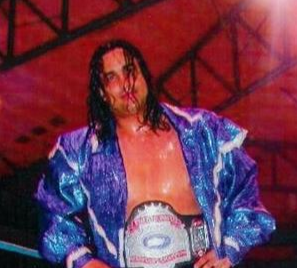
González as the WWC Puerto Rico Champion

On February 19, 2000, he defeated Colón to regain the championship. At Aniversario 2000, González dropped the championship to Colón after Álvarez accidentally hit him. González turned on Álvarez, beginning a trend in which he would turn on wrestlers that "failed" the Familia. In this manner he entered a feud with Ayala and brought Curt Hennig to challenge for the title. His next guest challenger was Jerry Flynn. After this feud concluded, González and Colón once again feuded, with him winning the Universal Heavyweight Championship from Álvarez. On November 16, 2000, González defeated WWC President Victor Jovica to win 16% of WWC's stocks. This was used to explain the introduction of his own half-hour segment in WWC programming, "El Café del Milenio". Later that month, he wrestled in a three-way dance against Huertas and Álvarez. In his first match of December, González defeated Colón. He subsequently re-joined Álvarez to wrestle Colón Sr. and Huertas to a no contest. González closed the year by getting disqualified in a match against Hennig, after turning on him in the usual fashion. One of the wrestlers that he brought in was Ricky Fontán, who wrestled as the masked "Super Gladiador". Once he lost the mask to a jobber, La Familia expelled him. In a match against Fontán, the title was held up. On October 26, 2001, González won a rematch to regain the championship. This was followed by a program in which Félix "Barrabás" López and the tag team of Thunder and Lightning, composed by Reynaldo "Thunder" Rodríguez and Alex "Lightning" Cruz took control of the stable away from González. This led to a brief partnership between him and Colón, who teamed to defeat Thunder and Lightning. However, González turned on him shortly afterwards and recovered control of La Familia del Nuevo Millenio. In Lockout, González dropped the title in another match. González was later invited to participate in two tapings of the X Wrestling Federation, owned by Valentine and Jimmy Hart. In this promotion, he teamed with Konnan to defeat Juventud Guerrera and Psicosis. In his only singles match for the XWF, González defeated Kevin Northcutt. He then brought in another foreign challenger to WWC, Vampiro, only to turn on him. In May 2002, González defeated him by disqualification twice. Subsequently, González left the WWC after wrestling in WWC for over a decade, due to internal conflicts against Colón Sr. and Jovica following six months of irregular payment.

=== Rey Fénix, Capitol Sports departure to IWA and NWA World Championship (2002–2005) ===
González entered the International Wrestling Association under a mask as "Rey Fénix" in July 2002 weeks after leaving WWC due to disagreements with both Jovica and Colón. The change was forced due to a lawsuit filed by WWC over the identity of "Ray González". Upon arriving, he joined Juan Rivera's (as Savio Vega) heel stable, "La Compañia" and feuded with Germán Figueroa (as "El León" Apolo), Gilbert Cosme (as Ricky Banderas) and Shane Sewell over the IWA World Heavyweight Championship. González won his first IWA World Heavyweight Championship at Golpe de Estado 2002 by defeating Banderas. This match was contested under heavy rain before a full Estadio Roberto Clemente Walker and became known as La Lucha del Siglo ("The Match of the Century"), being recognized eight years later as the best performance of the 2000s. Subsequently, a storyline was run where González started having problems with Vega over Banderas being allowed into La Compañia while they were feuding over the title. In February 2003, he gathered a sum of money to purchase his contract, but Vega refused to grant him a release. He then lost the title to Apolo on November 9, 2002, in Bayamón, Puerto Rico. On February 1, 2003, once the lawsuit had been won in his favor, González unmasked and turned babyface. He won his second World Heavyweight Championship by defeating Banderas on April 5, 2003, in an event held in Carolina, Puerto Rico. After unmasking, González joined the dominant face faction, "El Ejército de la Gente". In June 2003, González was attacked by a masked Fontán, billed as "Super Fénix". In July 2003, when Huertas arrived to the IWA, he asked to form a partnership. At Summer Attitude, González challenged Figueroa for the World Heavyweight Championship before a crowd of 11,000 fans. In October 2003, González defeated Banderas to become the first contender. In June 2003, Carly Colón signed a developmental contract with World Wrestling Entertainment. The following month, IWA began promoting the arrival of the "son of a legend that is universally recognized" which was heavily hinted to be Colón, but in reality, turned out to be Ric Flair's son, David Flair. He feuded with Banderas, Vega and Figueroa for the rest of the year until Víctor "The Bodyguard" Rodríguez turned on him in November 2003 and sided with Flair. He won the Intercontinental Heavyweight Championship from Flair on November 30, 2003, in Mayagüez, Puerto Rico. To close 2003, Thunder and Lightning arrived to the IWA, soon joining González to reform La Familia. Víctor "The Bodyguard" Rodríguez emerged as the self-proclaimed leader of La Compañia during his absence. With the groups defined, La Familia now moved with the intent of acquiring full control of IWA. Immediately after being reformed, the group entered into a feud with the Ejercíto de la Gente, namely Figueroa, Pérez Jr. and Cotto. In May 2004, González challenged for the Intercontinental Heavyweight Championship. The same week, he retained his title over Cotto. González entered an angle where he competed with José Chaparro for the contents of a "black box" that was stolen from Vega, but decided to join forces instead, announcing the return of El Café del Milenio. On June 5, 2004, La Familia and La Compañia joined forces and Chaparro along them. However, this storyline was interrupted by the death of Rodríguez due to a heart attack, and Vega unsuccessfully attempted to regain control of the General Manager by challenging González at Summer Attitude.

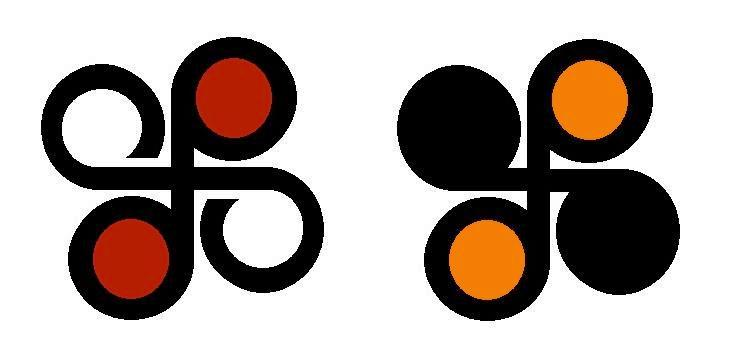
The two versions of the Capitol Sports Promotions logo

In August 2004, he was involved in an angle in which he won 49% of IWA's stocks. He then entered a feud with the owner of the remaining 51%, Victor Quiñones. On August 28, 2004, at Bad Blood, González announced that from that moment onwards, IWA would be known as "Capitol Sports", claiming that Quiñones had already received documentation confirming this. Despite this, the IWA took the angle seriously and replaced the IWA's logo in all of its promotional material and website with a modified darker and duller version of the Capitol Sports Promotions logo. The creative team also added Apollo 100's "Joy", a track often used by Capitol Sports Promotions, to its televised commercials and the El Café del Milenio segment. In a subsequent interview, González claimed that he actually owned the 51% and that Quiñonez had misread the contract, noting that any wrestler that did not side with the new regime would be fired. When questioned if he would fill the ensuing vacants by bringing talent from WWC, he noted that was plan and revealed that one of the first acquisitions was "a surprise wrestler [that has] Capitol running through his veins". To further confirm that he was referring to Carly Colón (who had recently turned on his family as part of an angle that WWC prepared in anticipation to his promotion from Ohio Valley Wrestling to WWE SmackDown), González went on to describe his new associate as someone with whom he had problems in the past that were now overcome, going on to praise him as a "young [...] great wrestler" with great "stamina" and a "tremendous future in the United States" (in reference to Colón's contract with WWE). During this description, Chaparro made gesticulations that mimicked the afro that Colón had grown during the summer of 2004 while preparing for the debut of a new character. González concluded by noting how this signing was done so this wrestler could complete an unspecified "special" task for Capitol Sports, because this was the "perfect person" to accomplish it. The IWA further mocked Colón in a skit where Savio Vega dismissed this revelation, citing that he was going to air the video of a match where Flash Flanagan (who was active in the promotion performing as "Slash Venom") pinned him at OVW. This angle was concluded in a segment where González berated an unknown individual during a call for being unable to appear in a card, claiming that "he [was] as mediocre as [his] father and brother".

González then began recruiting Huertas to join him, claiming that their origin in "Capitol joins them". On September 4, 2004, he dropped the title to Figueroa due to intervention from Havana, who then proposed to her. This angle continued when González interrupted the scripted wedding, painting the bride's dress in black. In September 2004, somebody assaulted Huertas backstage, leaving behind Vega's trademark bat. It was subsequently revealed that the culprit was "Lightning" Cruz acting on his behalf, just when Huertas was about to join the "Capitol" faction. On October 9, 2004, González announced that "Capitol" had formed an alliance with Total Nonstop Action Wrestling-NWA for Golpe de Estado and that this move would bring in NWA World Heavyweight Champion Jeff Jarrett, Robert Roode, Konnan and Shawn Hernandez. Immediately after completing this announcement, Vega proposed that they bet the stocks at Golpe de Estado with the winner taking full control of both halves of the promotion, which was accepted. On October 14, 2004, with the score tied between "Capitol" and IWA, González lost to Figueroa ending the name change angle. During the course of the undercard, La Familia turned on Konnan for losing. In the next event, González brought in the Commissioners of the fictional Puerto Rico Box and Wrestling Commission to challenge the result, only to assault them after being told that IWA did in fact win. The feud with Figueroa resumed when he interrupted González match against Sewell for the Intercontinental Championship. At Noche de Campeones, he defeated Figueroa to win the World Heavyweight Championship. At Hardcore Weekend, González brought in Homicide and Mafia from Ring of Honor to face the Ejercíto, but lost his match against Figueroa. After failing to secure a partnership with a now-heel Vega, González made a face turn and entered a feud against Jarrett. In the promotion of their feud, references were made to the latter's status as the incumbent King of the Mountain. On April 3, 2005, he faced Jarrett for the NWA World Heavyweight Championship with a TNA referee as part of Juicio Final. González won the match by pinfall to become the second Puerto Rican to pin a NWA Champion in a titular match. However, the title was stripped later in the same event, when Jarrett complained that José Vázquez, the referee that made the count once the TNA official was knocked out, was not recognized by the NWA. IWA recognized the reign on television because the pin was clean and Vázquez was a sanctioned IWA referee and thus, allowed to replace another referee in case of injury. This win was retroactively recognized by the NWA nearly ten years later, with the organization including the title change in their official list on February 16, 2015.

=== La Familia and World Heavyweight Championship feuds (2005–2008) ===
On May 14, 2005, González lost to Sewell. The following night he defeated Vega's bodyguard, Miguel "Mr.Big" Maldonado in an anything goes match. González won his next contest over Jean Pierre Lafitte. The feud continued with him teaming with Banderas victory over Lafitte and Sewell. González next entered a feud with Jason Bates, trading wins. This came to an end when he teamed with Banderas to defeat Bates and Lafitte. Four days later he participated in a Texas Tornado match teaming with Chicano to defeat Sewell and Maldonado. This was followed by two victories over midcarder Edgar Díaz. The team of González and Banderas teamed once again to defeat Lafitte and Vega. Gonzâlez won the Víctor The Bodyguard Memorial Cup but lost to Vega in the same event. He then entered a concrete feud with Maldonado, picking two wins and one no contest. González's next neud was with Slash Venom, who defeated him in a tag team match. After interrupting this angle by wrestling Figueroa to a no contest, González defeated Kindred in a tag team and singles match. Leading to Sumner Attitude 2005, he teamed with Bison Smith to defeat Figueroa and Vega. At the actual event, González defeated Vega. In his next appearances, González lost three tag team matches against different variations of La Compañia. However, he did pick two disqualification victories over Vega. In their next confrontation, González won a lumberjack match. He lost consecutive tag team contests against the team of Maldonado and Hannibal. González went on to gather singles victories over Maldonado and Ricky Cruz. González teamed with Thunder and Lightning twice, defeating Vega and different members of La Compañia. He subsequently defeated Cruz and Vega in lumberjack matches.

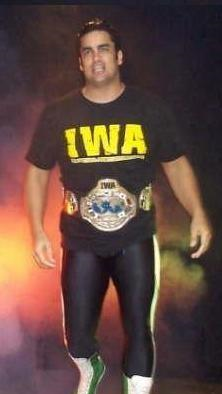
González as the IWA World Heavyweight Champion

At Hardcore Weekend, González lost a coal miner's match to Banderas, avenging this lost the following week. La Familia continued its feud against La Cruz del Diablo and La Compañia, rounding a record of 2–1. On December 12, 2005, he unsuccessfully challenged Kindred for the Hardcore Championship. González closed the year by defeating Figueroa at Christmas in PR. On January 6, 2006, he defeated Vega in a "loser leaves IWA" match. For the following month, he feuded with Figueroa, Kindred and Maldonado, exchanging victories. On February 18, 2006, a returning Vega defeated González while wrestling under his "El hombre que ellos llaman T.N.T." gimmick. He then turned face and entered a winning streak of five contests, gathering wins over Cotto, Kindred and Huertas González. This streak ended in a tag team match, when he lost to Vega and Huertas, then known as "Los Inhumanos". This feud continued, with Los Inhumanos earning a 3–1 advantage. However, González did win a titular contest over Huertas and another over Jeff Bradley. He went on to gather wins over Vega and Christian Martínez, as well as a successful title defense over slugga, but lost rematches against Huertas and Ricky Cruz. On September 2, 2006, González defeated Mikael Judas to win the World Heavyweight Championship. This ignited a feud, in which he won four consecutive tag team matches. On September 16, 2006, González once again defeated Judas in a contest for the World Heavyweight Championship. A rematch ended in a no contest, but Judas did win a "baseball bat in a pole" contest. González defeated Judas and Maldonado in singles matches, also picking a victory over The British Milicia in tag team competition. Around this time, "Lightning" Cruz turned on La Familia and went on to defeat González and Judas in a four corners match, going on to win the World Heavyweight Championship. González won a singles match between them by disqualification. This was followed by the final stage of his long running feud with Judas, which concluded with him earning an advantage of 4–1.

On December 9, 2006, González dropped the title to Sewell, prompting a heel turn and a rivalry between them. After Sewell won three straight contests, including a rematch for the title, he was disqualified in a special challenge against Bison Smith. The following day he won the World Heavyweight Championship and formed a partnership with Smith. However, Sewell won all of the tag team matches between them while his partner, Banderas, defeated González one on one. Depots this run, he retained the title in a rubber match held on February 3, 2007. González then teamed with Judas and reunited with "Lightning" Cruz winning two out of three appearances over the face stable. However, Vega's reappearance earned Sewell and Banderas the upper hand, going on to win a 3-on-3 match, while another was ruled a no contest. On February 24, 2007, González participated in an over-the-top battle royal, won by Sewell, who also won a tag team match between them in his next appearance. The following month, he was involved in a feud against Thunder and Lightning, losing to both in singles matches and a tag team contest. On March 23, 2007, González defeated Pérez, which was followed by two more matches against Los Autenticos, which his team lost in a six-on-six. González also defended the IWA World Heavyweight Championship against Billy Kidman and Joe Bravo. Following a hiatus, González made his return to the IWA on December 15, 2007, participating on the Christmas in PR event. At Histeria Boricua 2008, he returned by teaming with Figueroa to defeat Los Autenticos. In February 2008, González formed a tag team with Cotto, which was quickly dissolved when he turned heel following two losses. He won two consecutive matches, before fading from IWA programming.

=== Return of El Cóndor and Rey Fénix (2008–2011) ===
González reappeared in WWC, once again adopting the character of "El Cóndor" and donning its mask. He aligned himself with Chaparro and demanded to be part of WWC's Tournament to determine a champion for the vacated Universal Heavyweight Championship. The tournament consisted of wrestlers competing against each other and the winner receiving points to determine the top contenders, with a final being held at Aniversario 2008. He entered the tournament, quickly gaining his first points by winning a three-way match. He interrupted his participation by entering a feud against the Colón family. After wrestling Colón Sr. to a no contest, González joined Jovica against him and Orlando Colón, but lost. His next two contests were double count outs and after failing to accumulate any points, he challenged Orlando Colón to a stipulation match. González won and his point total was upgraded to tie Colón's, however, the following week he announced that he was going to drop out of the race for the title, citing "more important business". This being to focus on his ongoing feud, which saw him take a 3–1 lead before getting disqualified against Eddie Colón. They had a re-match where Cóndor took off his mask before he wrestled Orlando. He was identified as Ray González, but because there was "no evidence", continually denied his unmasking. He appeared on a show named Anda pa'l Cara to confront Carlos Colón Sr. and Carly Colón. He took off his mask in front of the cameras and revealed his identity as Ray González. He threw coffee onto Carly Colón's shirt and slapped Carlos Colón Sr. across the face.

In Aniversario 2008 González defeated Carly Colón in a match promoted as an eliminatory to determine the "best pound for pound wrestler in Puerto Rico". He went on to win consecutive contests over both of the cousins, before losing twice to Orlando. González was also involved in a sub-feud with Thunder and Lightning, winning two tag team matches but losing to Lightning. On August 23, 2008, he brought back his talk show "El Cafe del milenio" but he changed the name to "Ray-tings Cafe". After exchanging defeats with Orlando Colón, he entered the race for the Universal World Championship again. His main challenger was Sewell, who beat him in a non-title confrontation. On September 20, 2008, González defeated Sewell to win the vacant title. He won his first two defenses over Sabu and Kindred, while also picking a victory over Ángel "BJ" Rosado. "Thunder" Rodríguez was the first to win an opportunity by winning a singles match, but González retained twice. On November 23, 2008, he was betrayed by "La Familia" led by Álvarez for failing to negotiate a re-institution to WWC. This was followed by a double feud against Charles Evans and Steve Corino, which saw him defeat Evans twice. After retaining against Corino once, González dropped the championship to him on January 31, 2009. After this, he exchanged tag team wins with Corino and wrestled him to a double disqualification. The delayed feud with Álvarez resumed and González won a singles match but lost in tag team competition. He went on to exchange victories with Kizarny and defeat Idol Stevens. González also exchanged matches with Corino but failed to regain the Universal Heavyweight Championship. However, a masked wrestler simply known as "La Pesadilla" began antagonizing him during this time, evolving into a series of matches.

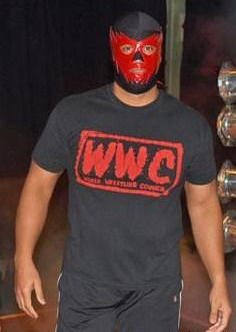
González as El Cóndor

González gained a 2–1 edge in matches involving La Pesadilla, but insisted that it clearly was Orlando Colón behind the mask, which lead to another exchange of victories between both. After defeating Corino and his manager, Chaparro, he challenged La Pesadilla to a hair vs. mask match at Aniversario. At the event, González defeated La Pesadilla in a match where Félix Trinidad served as special referee, to reveal that it was in fact Colón, who countered weeks after by double teaming him along Hiram Tua. As a consequence, González suffered a storyline neck injury that forced him to retire from the World Wrestling Council. However, this hiatus was short-lived and after earning victories over Stevens and exchanging contests with Bradley, the feud with Colón resumed, with both men once again emerging with one victory a piece. At Euphoria 2010, González defeated Banderas and Carly Colón to win the Wrestler of the Decade Cup. However, he dropped it to Banderas the following week. González went on to defeat Eric Pérez on three consecutive times and Orlando Colón in a stipulation match. This was followed by a battle royal to determine the first contender for the Universal Heavyweight Championship, which Cotto won. Despite this, González participated and won a three-way dance for the title the following week. González quickly entered a feud with Scott Steiner, winning the first contest by disqualification. He retained it twice, including defeating Sinigalia. At Honor vs Traición 2010, Steiner won the second matchup against González to win the title. He followed this by winning a tag team match, regaining the first contendership by defeating Torres and winning a rematch over Chaparro. At Summer Madness, a contest between González and Steiner finished controversially and was declared a no contest, with the Universal Heavyweight Championship being held up. He followed this with a victory in a rematch over Sinigaglia and yet another exchange of victories with Orlando Colón. At Aniversario 2010, González defeated Steiner to regain the Universal Heavyweight Championship. On July 31, 2010, he dropped the title to Shelton Benjamin following external intervention from the debuting Gilbert. González disappeared from WWC programming following this event, only being mentioned occasionally during Gilbert's promos.

Prior to Christmas in PR 2010, the IWA began running an angle where a "mysterious voice" left messages to some of its wrestlers. On January 6, 2011, hours before the "Histeria Boricua" event was going to be held in Bayamón, the IWA published a video featuring a masked Rey Fénix announcing his presence at the event. At the actual event, González donned the mask and demanded a rematch against Banderas, claiming that he had "never defeated Rey Fénix". The match was promoted as "La Revancha del siglo" (The rematch of the century) and was won by Banderas. The angle with the "mysterious voice" continued for some time, in instances being hinted as a psychotic conversation between González and his alter ego. A conclusion came at Juicio Final, when it was revealed that he had been mocking the fans all along and proceeded to remove the mask. González then recruited Thunder and Lightning as well as the academy, a group composed by Olympic style wrestler, Phillip Cardona, and the undefeated Intercontinental Heavyweight Champion, Chris Angel. Following this, González made several non-wrestling appearances explaining that in Angel he saw "a younger version" of himself. Despite this, he left the IWA shortly after the promotion ceased to work with Telemundo de Puerto Rico, entering another period of inactivity.

=== Feud with Gilbert; La Nueva Familia (2011–2013) ===
On December 3, 2011, Gilbert Cruz mentioned González on a segment of Las Superestrellas de la Lucha Libre Saturday edition, also stating that "he [was] tired of being compared to Ray González" and later reiterating that "[González] ran away from wrestling because he was afraid of him" before issuing an invitation for the latter to be the guest in a skit hosted by him titled "La Opinión de Gilbert". González accepted, appearing in a segment where he confirmed his presence at Lockout. The event took place on December 17, 2011, with the segment serving as the starting point for a feud between both wrestlers. González won their first encounter at Euphoria 2012, but Cruz retaliated at La Hora de la Verdad to become the first contender to the Universal Championship. He was then involved in an angle against manager Orlando Toledo, concluding with a victory over one of his clients, Kenny Dykstra. At Camino a la Gloria, González became the first contender for the Universal Championship by winning a three-way match over Roberto Rubio and Dykstra, however the rest of Toledo's stable attacked him and a run in by Colón and Thunder and Lightning hinted at an alliance. After defeating Rubio in singles competition, the creation of a new version of La Familia began being hinted in television segments in which the manager of Thunder and Lightning, Félix "Barrabás" López, began recruiting members. Despite this, González turned down the offer to recreate his old stable and wrestled Cruz for the title, but was unable to win it after being attacked by two masked wrestlers during the match.

On May 12, 2012, González wrestled Colón in a bid to become the first contender, but the masked duo intervened and later revealed their identity as Thunder and Lightning, officializing the emergence La Nueva Familia as a heel antithesis. This was followed by a mirror version of the angle where both teamed for the first time. This led to a bet at Aniversario, where González and Colón risked their hair and Thunder and Lightning their masks. Leading up to the event, he challenged Cruz for the Universal Championship, but the intervention of La Nueva Familia prevented a conclusion. At Summer Madness, González defeated a disguised Lightning, which was billed as a "surprise wrestler" brought in by "Barrabás" López. On June 29, 2012, he opened Aniversario by defeating Davey Richards during the first date of the event. The following night, González and Colón won the bet to unmask Thunder and Lightning, but lost a rematch to close Aniversario. The feud was extended throughout August and during this timeframe he defeated both members of Thunder and Lightning by disqualification. Both teams faced each other in a handcuff match at Septiembre Negro, but Colón turned on González, costing them the match and leading to a new feud. He made an unexpected alliance with Cruz, joining him in two losses and a win against Thunder and Lightning. At Halloween Wrestling Xtravaganza the tag team joined Carlos Colón Sr. to defeat Thunder & Lightning and "Barrabás" López.

On October 28, 2012, González defeated Andy Levine to win the Universal championship. This title rekindled the feud with Colón who unsuccessfully challenged him, but lead to a stipulation that Rivera, who had entered the promotion after the IWA closed, would serve as special referee during their next match at Lockout. Colón Sr. sided with González in this angle, scoring a win over his son, a returning Figueroa and "Barrabás" López. An additional hair vs. hair match was subsequently added. In the meantime, González successfully defended the title against Levine twice. At Lockout, lost the match to Colón after Rivera turned on him, starting a new angle. Their first encounter as won by the returning persona of Rey Fénix, which was adopted only for this match. González continued a two-way feud with Rivera and Colon, defeating the latter but losing in tag team action after joining Victor Jovica. After Rivera won a rematch, González retained the title in another encounter. Colón also lost an opportunity for the championship, but was joined by several other heels in an assault that concluded when Thunder and Lightning intervened on his behalf.

=== Rey Fénix vs. Súper Fénix; Los Inhumanos (2013–2014) ===
A masked Cruz was introduced to the angle as a new version of the Súper Fénix, with González losing their first two encounters and dropping the Universal Championship. A third match for the title concluded in a double disqualification. González then wrestled a recent addition to Colón's stable, a now-heel Huertas, to a disqualification. Cruz retained the Universal Championship at Camino a la Gloria 2013. After briefly interrupting the feud with a match against Colón, Gonzalez won the title in a stipulation match where his career was on the line, holding it for a pair of weeks before losing it to Cruz's associate, Chris Angel. A rematch concluded with a disqualification. During this timeframe, an angle took place where Cruz defied being Súper Fénix, leading to a career vs. mask match at Summer Madness. The event took place on June 29, 2013, Cruz defeated González, who entered into another hiatus in his career following a faux retirement ceremony. The following month, the character of El Fénix made a return joining Rivera, who had been expelled from the heel faction, to feud with Huertas and Cruz.

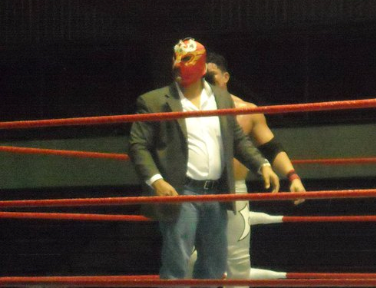
González as Rey Fénix

At Aniversario both versions of the Fénix faced each other, with Cruz losing the contest and his mask. Later in the event, a still masked González intervened and costed Colón a match against Sting. After unsuccessfully challenging Angel for the Universal Championship, he resumed his previous feud. A mask vs hair match was announced for Crossfire in which Colón defeated Rey Fénix, but it was revealed that Ricky Santana had supplanted González for this event. On that same night, the storyline involving the faux retirement was concluded by granting him permission to resume his career. Despite winning, Colón protested the switch and intervened in a contest between him and Angel. At Lockout, a masked heel wrestler known as Mighty Ursus attacked González after losing a match, beginning a parallel feud. The following night, he resumed his previous storyline by defeating Colón. Another match between them concluded with the same result to open Euphoria 2014. The following night González joined Santana in a loss to Colón and Huertas, the latter of whom betrayed his partner. Days later Rivera, who had adopted a martial arts gimmick that he used two decades earlier known as TNT, also turned to recreate a faction known as Los Inhumanos.

He joined Colón to defeat this team, but they were subsequently assaulted until Miguel Pérez made the save in his return to the local scene. González joined the former president of IWA, but lost to Los Inhumanos. Individually, he defeated Rivera twice to win the Universal Championship. Ursus served as the new contender for the championship, with their first encounter concluding in a disqualification. González won a rematch, but was assaulted after the match. A rubber match at Camino a la Gloria concluded with the same result. González's next opponent was Levine, who was managed by Huertas. After a successful defense, he was involved in a backstage segment where he was ambushed, leading to a disqualification win a in rematch. Leading to another match against Levine, González was challenged by Chaparro to defend against Ursus, now his client. This began two parallel feuds, after the challenge was accepted for the upcoming Summer Madness. On June 21, 2014, González retained in a match that José Laureano worked as his manager. The feud with Ursus continued throughout the following month, with him dominating all but one where Chaparro created a false ending by ringing the bell prematurely leading to a disqualification.

=== Alberto del Rio; Ray González Jr. (2014–2015) ===
On July 19, 2014, González dropped the title to Ursus. Rivera interfered in a rematch for the title and reverted to his Savio Vega persona, joining Ursus and a new manager, Juan Manuel Ortega. The first match of this new series concluded in a disqualification, with another taking place the following week. On August 24, 2014, WWC began a transition of storyline by airing a backstage segment where Ortega talked by telephone with someone only identified as "patrón" and referenced a reunion previously held at WrestleMania XXX. The following week featured a segment where the manager picked Ricardo Rodriguez from Luis Muñoz Marín International Airport and drove to a golf club where González was playing a round. There it was revealed that the former WWE ring announcer had been sent on behalf of Alberto Del Rio (who had recently adopted the persona of "El Patrón Alberto" in AAA after being fired from WWE for unsportsmanlike conduct), delivering a sign of disrespect as a "personal message" before fleeing the scene. The following week a match between both was confirmed for Septiembre Negro, where González defeated Rodriguez (now promoted as "El Emisario de El Patrón"), also injuring his leg after the encounter, and challenged Del Rio to a match at Aniversario.

This was followed by a match against Ursus and a revival of his feud with Cruz, while internal negotiations continued. On September 24, 2014, the storyline with Rodriguez continued, when he was depicted calling Ortega to confirm the presence of Del Rio at Aniversario. However, after being announced Del Rio was unable to make an appearance and the storyline digressed, while his absence was attributed to "la migra". On October 12, 2014, González defeated Gilbert. After the match, Ricardo Rodríguez ordered the debuting Hernandez to attack him. González defeated Hernandez at Aniversario, but was subsequently attacked and left covered by the flag of Mexico. Other feuds were hinted and during this event, he also joined a returning Huertas to defeat Álvarez and Ursus. Meanwhile, Ortega took over the role of main antagonist by bringing in Jinder Mahal and Noriega as a surprise opponent, but both failed to fulfill his goal. González defeated Hernandez in a tables match at Lockout, but was attacked by Mahal afterwards.

González vs. Alberto Del Rio

On January 3, 2015, both faced each other in an Indian Strap Match, which González won. The following day he filled a vacant and defeated Colón to win the WWC Universal Championship. On January 17, 2015, the title was held up due to the circumstances and the champion was to be determined in a three-way cagematch the following week. Colón won the contest, but González suffered a legitimate injury and was removed from the arena in an ambulance. Fractures in the L5 and S1 vertebrae affected his movement, leading to surgery weeks later. While he recovered, his 17-year-old son Rey debuted in WWC as El Hijo de Ray González while he played the passive role of counselor. Despite mainly appearing in backstage segments emphasizing his recovery, González made a brief return to the ring by joining his son against Colón and a masked underling as part of the summer Madness card. However, after defeating his long-time rival in singles, González resumed his physical therapies.

On August 11, 2015, his figure was involved in an ongoing rivalry between the promotion and the World Wrestling League, when the latter published a segment implying that a stable formed by former WWC employees, named El Consejo, had a leader and which featured an unknown wrestler impersonating his voice and congratulating the stable for what they had done. A rebuttal came in the form of a video where González urged those involved to "abandon [that] rubbish" which was followed by the announcement that he was now the legitimate owner of a fraction of the promotion. Despite remaining inactive, he also served as the guest referee of Aniversario's main event. Earlier in the night, González celebrated along his son when the latter won the Puerto Rico Heavyweight Championship.

On November 7, 2015, WWC resumed the angle with Del Rio, beginning with a segment where he assaulted his son during a training session at Texas Wrestling Academy, citing it as payback for his father injuring Rodriguez. The skit was filmed before the former returned to WWE, but was given continuity. This was the only external appearance cleared by the promotion after the enactment of a new contract, even superseding his remaining compromises as the incumbent Mega Champion of AAA. The following day, González challenged Del Rio to a match. The promotion of the event focused on the vindictiveness that fueled the training of the former, and also included an interview where the latter expressed confidence. The script of both wrestlers took on a nationalistic approach, including external elements such as the Mexico–Puerto Rico boxing rivalry, as well as a recap of Pierroth's run in WWC. On December 5, 2015, González defeated Del Rio by disqualification at Lockout. Then, at Euphoria 2016, Ray faced El Hijo de Dos Caras in a Street Fight where González defeated him. Months later, Ray was defeated for Alberto Del Rio on the second night of Aniversario 43 in a Cage of Death Match. The following year, he turned heel, forming a faction called “El Sindicato”, which he led. The Next year, he supported his son, Ray González Jr, and The Precious One Gilbert in their quest to become world tag Team champions. In 2019, he became the Director of Operations of WWC, where he back engaged in a rivalry with Gilbert; a year later, he brokered an agreement beetween WWC and IWA with Savio Vega. Then, at Histeria Boricua, Ray and Savio finalized their agreement.

== Personal life ==
Outside of professional wrestling, he is the father of four children, three daughters and a son. González divides his time between tending to them and maintaining a family store, now known as Rayting Minimarket, in the municipality of Dorado. Originally inherited from his father, "Yuyin" González, he decided not to change the business model to something more lucrative and instead choose to honor the "legacy and sacrifice" of his family, noting that he still feels identified with the people there, who still recognize him by the given name of Ramón instead of his alter ego. It was due to these responsibilities and his local success that González declined several offers to wrestle abroad, further fueled by a concern that the stability of WWC as a promotion could be threatened if he migrated since Rivera had left to WWE several years before and had been joined by Miguel Pérez Jr. and Jesús Castillo Jr. (all three would form Los Boricuas). He is also a follower of mainstream sports and a fan of teams like Vaqueros de Bayamón and the New York Yankees.

== In other media ==
González is mentioned in Bad Bunny’s single "Puesto Pa' Guerrial", released in the album YHLQMDLG.

== Championships and accomplishments ==
- Americas Wrestling Federation (Puerto Rico)
  - AWF World Junior Heavyweight Championship (2 times)
  - AWF World Tag Team Championship (1 time) - with Tom Brandi
- International Wrestling Association
  - IWA Undisputed World Heavyweight Championship (7 times)
  - IWA Intercontinental Championship (2 times)
- National Wrestling Alliance
  - NWA World Heavyweight Championship (1 time)
- Pro Wrestling Illustrated
  - PWI ranked him #95 of the top 500 singles wrestlers in the PWI 500 in 1994
- World Wrestling Council
  - WWC Universal Heavyweight Championship (23 times)
  - WWC Puerto Rico Championship (6 times)
  - WWC World Junior Heavyweight Championship (2 times)
  - WWC Television Championship (2 times)
  - WWC World Tag Team Championship (11 times) - with El Bronco 1 (3), Huracan Castillo Jr. (3) Ricky Santana (3), Rex King (1) and La Ley (1)
  - WWC Caribbean Tag Team Championship (2 time) - with Ricky Santana
  - WWC Intercontinental Heavyweight Championship (1 time)
  - Copa Luchador de la Década (2010)

=== Luchas de Apuestas record ===
Winner (wager)	Loser (wager)	Location	Event	Date	Notes
Ray González (hair)	Golden Boy (mask)	Caguas, Puerto Rico	Live event	September 27, 1997	
Ray González (hair)	Pierroth Jr. (mask)	Guaynabo, Puerto Rico	Live event	November 23, 1999	
Ray González (hair)	El Invader #1 (championship)	Caguas, Puerto Rico	Live event	February 9, 2002	
Ray González (hair)	La Pesadilla (mask)	Bayamón, Puerto Rico	WWC Aniversario 36	July 11, 2009	
Carlito and Ray González (hair)	Thunder and Lightning (masks)	Bayamón, Puerto Rico	WWC Aniversario 39	June 30, 2012	
Carlito (hair)	Ray González (hair)	Bayamón, Puerto Rico	WWC Lockout	December 9, 2012	
Súper Fenix (mask)	Ray González (career)	Caguas, Puerto Rico	WWC Summer Madness	June 29, 2013	
Gilbert (career)	Ray González (career)	Bayamón, Puerto Rico	WWC Noche De Campeones	June 29, 2019	
Ray González (Director of Operations position)	Xavant (hair)	Bayamón, Puerto Rico	WWC Euphoria	January 8, 2023	
Eddie Colón (Director of Operations position)	Ray González	Bayamón, Puerto Rico	Septiembre Negro	September 30, 2023	
Ray González	Intelecto 5 Estrellas	Moca, Puerto Rico	WWC En Ruta de Lockout	November 30, 2024	
Intelecto 5 Estrellas (mask)	Ray González (championship)	Bayamón, Puerto Rico	Euphoria 2025	January 11, 2025	
Ray González (retirement)	Eddie Colón (retirement)	Bayamón, Puerto Rico	WWC Aniversario 52	August 30, 2025	
Ray González (16% of the actions)	Carlito (Eddie Colón’s hair)	Bayamón, Puerto Rico	Euphoria 2026	January 24, 2026	

== See also ==
- Professional wrestling in Puerto Rico
