= IWA Women's Championship =

Professional wrestling women's championship

IWA Women's World Championship

Details
- Promotion: International Wrestling Association (Puerto Rico)
- Date established: March 31, 2007
- Current champion: La Brava Escobar

Other names
- IWA Women's Championship (2007-2010); IWA Women's World Championship (2023-present); IWA Undisputed Women's World Championship (also used in addition as referenced in IWA's website)
Statistics
- First champion: Amazona
- Most reigns: Genesis (3 reigns)
- Longest reign: Evie De La Rosa † 1167+
- Shortest reign: Genesis (10 days)

The IWA Women's World Championship (Spanish: "Campeonato Mundial Femenil de la IWA" in Spanish) is a women's professional wrestling championship promoted by the International Wrestling Association (IWA) promotion in Puerto Rico, basically was the women's championship of International Wrestling Association (IWA).

The championship is generally contested in professional wrestling matches, in which participants execute scripted finishes rather than contend in direct competition.

== History ==
On March 31, 2007 during the live event "La Sexta Extinción" at Bayamon, Puerto Rico, Hector "Voz de Trueno" Meléndez introduced the new Championship and the rules to Crown the inaugural champion via a tournament. The wrestlers announced were: La Morena, Sweet Nancy, Killer Kat, Amazona, Black Rose and Sexy Juliette. The tournament Started on April 14, 2007 during the event "Victor Quiñonez Memorial" with a Battle royal to determine the brackets of the tournament, the winner of the match was Sexy Juliette who advanced to the next round.

On July 26, 2018, the reactivation of the Women's Championship was announced as part of a relaunch of the IWA Florida branch. The title's vacancy is to be filled in a tournament along the Undisputed World Heavyweight and World Tag Team Championships.

=== Inaugural Tournament ===
First round (04/15-21-28/07)
Sexy Juliette	W
BYE
Black Rose	W
Sweet Nancy
Barbie Boy	W
Amy
Amazona	W
La Morena

Semifinals (05/05/07)
Sexy Juliette
Black Rose	W
Barbie Boy
Amazona	W

Final (05/12/07)
Black Rose
Amazona	W

== Title history ==
#	Wrestlers	Reign	Date	Days held	Location	Event	Notes	Ref
1	Amazona	1	May 12, 2007	118	Toa Baja, Puerto Rico	Juicio Final VII	Defeated "La Abusadora" Black Rose in a tournament final to be the inaugural champion.	
—	Vacated	—	September 3, 2007	—	—	—	Vacated when Amazona was released from IWA.	
2	Sweet Nancy	1	May 17, 2008	63	Bayamón, Puerto Rico	Juicio Final VIII	Defeated La Potra, Black Rose and Amazona in a 4-Way Match.	
3	Génesis	1	July 19, 2008	119	Bayamón, Puerto Rico	Summer Attitude (2008)	Defeated Sweet Nancy in a Prison Break Match where La Potra and Black Rose were in a cage jailed.	
4	Amazona	2	November 15, 2008	182	Bayamón, Puerto Rico	Hardcore Weekend (2008)	Tables & Chair Match.	
—	Vacated	—	May 16, 2009	—	Bayamón, Puerto Rico	IWA TV Taping	Vacated due to Amazona's pregnancy.	
5	Ramone	1	June 20, 2009	73	Cataño, Puerto Rico	IV Copa José Miguel Pérez	Defeated Barbie Boy for the vacant IWA Women's Title.	
6	Barbie Boy	1	August 1, 2009	63	Ciales, Puerto Rico	IWA TV Taping	Apparently Self-appointed champion with help from Queen Jay Adonis.	
7	Queen Jay Adonis	1	October 3, 2009	70	Cataño, Puerto Rico	IWA TV Taping		
8	Barbie Boy	2	December 12, 2009	63	Bayamón, Puerto Rico	Christmas in PR (2009)		
—	Vacated	—	February 13, 2010	—	Bayamón, Puerto Rico	Payback/La Venganza (2010)	Vacated by GM Joe Bravo after firing Barbie Boy plus Adonis and being attacked by Elite Group	
9	Zoe The Golden Princess	1	March 20, 2010	119	Las Piedras, Puerto Rico	Copa Alcalde Las Piedras	Defeated Amazona who previously attacked Génesis to get the spot.	
10	Génesis	2	July 17, 2010	109	Bayamón, Puerto Rico	Summer Attitude (2010)		
	Inactive		November 3, 2010				Title became inactive.	
11	Génesis	3	April 5, 2023	10	Bayamón, Puerto Rico	Summer Attitude (2010)	Reinstated as the champion during her battle with cancer.	
—	Vacated	—	April 15, 2023	—	Humacao, Puerto Rico	IWA:Juicio Final (2023)	Vacated on the same day by IWA's president Savio Vega on behalf of Genesis due to her battle with cancer; she died on 23–06–12. Genesis	
12	Krystal	1	April 15, 2023	63	Humacao, Puerto Rico	Juicio Final (2023)	Defeats Nathalya Perez and Roxxy in a 3-way match to win the vacant title.	
13	Roxxy	1	June 17, 2023	63	Humacao, Puerto Rico	Summer Attitude (2023)	Defeats Krystal, Nathalya Perez, LaBrava Escobar, and Nahir Robles in a 5-way match.	
14	Evie De La Rosa	1	August 19, 2023	539	Juncos, Puerto Rico	Conflicto Letal (2023)	Defeats Krystal, Nathalya Perez, LaBrava Escobar, and Nahir Robles in a 5-way match.	
15	Black Rose	1	February 8, 2025	87	Toa Baja, Puerto Rico	House Show		
16	Evie de La Rosa	2	May 4, 2025	0	Caguas, Puerto Rico	House Show		
17	Daisy Lyn	1	May 4, 2025	543	Caguas, Puerto Rico	House Show	Cash in a Genesis Cup to win the title.	
18	Persia Pierce	1	July 18, 2026	91	Humacao, Puerto Rico	Copa Mundial de la Lucha Libre		
19	La Brava Escobar	1	October 17, 2026	12+	Humacao, Puerto Rico	Golpe de Estado		

== Combined reigns ==
†	Indicates the current champion

Rank	Wrestler	No. of reigns	Combined days
1	Evie De La Rosa	2	539
2	Amazona	2	300
3	Génesis	3	238
4	Barbie Boy	2	126
5	Zoe The Golden Princess	1	119
6	Ramone	1	73
7	Queen Jay Adonis	1	70
8	Sweet Nancy	1	63
8	Krystal	1	63
8	Roxxy	1	63
9	Daisy Lyn †	1	543+
