= WWC Universal Heavyweight Championship =

Professional wrestling championship

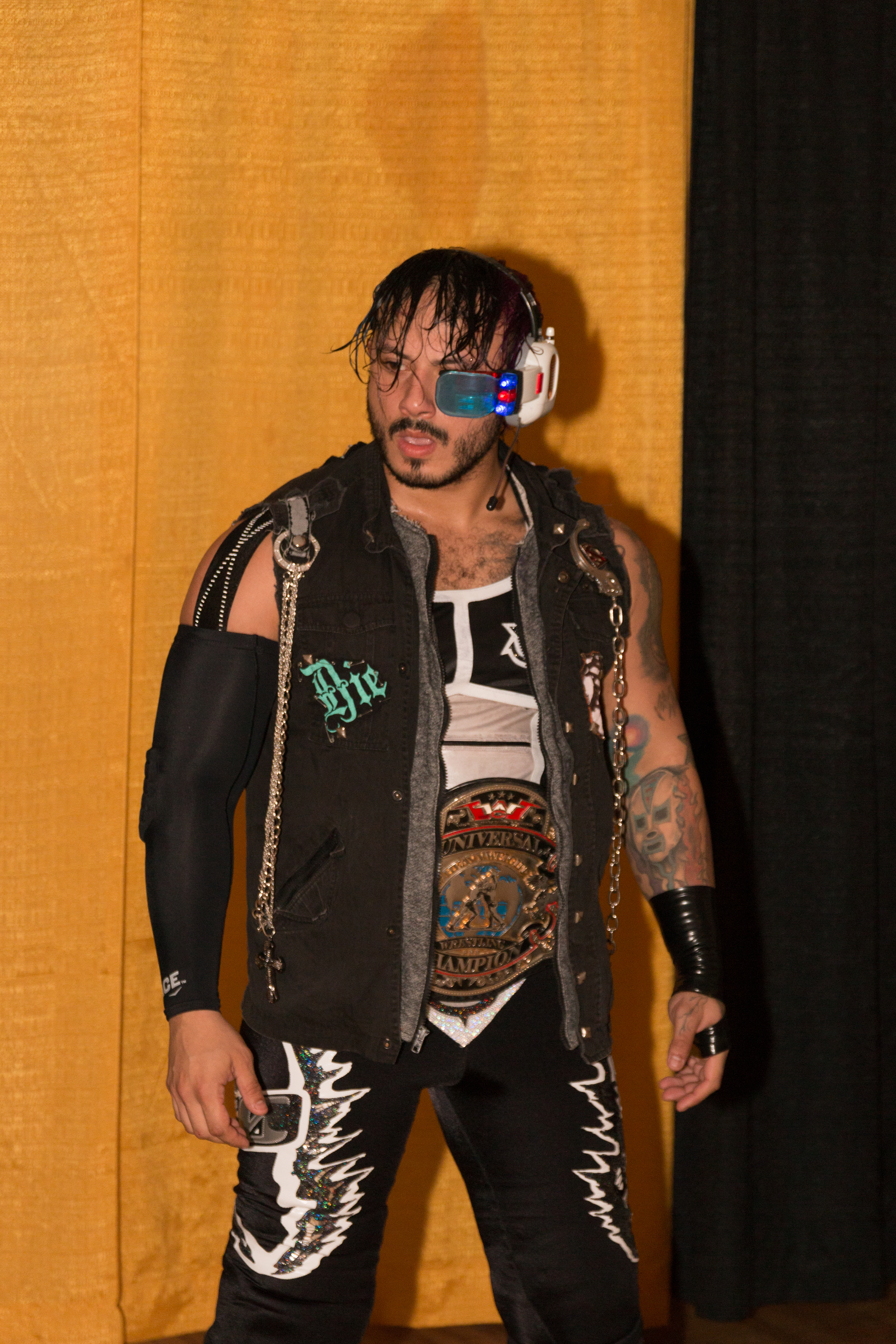
- Two-time champion Mr. 450, wearing the title belt

Details
- Promotion: World Wrestling Council (WWC)
- Date established: June 20, 1982
- Current champion: Zcion RT1
- Date won: June 27, 2026

Other name
- WWC World Heavyweight Championship
Statistics
- First champion: Abdullah the Butcher
- Most reigns: Carlos Colón (26 reigns)
- Longest reign: Carlos Colón (655 days)
- Shortest reign: Vampiro (<1 day)
- Oldest champion: Abdullah the Butcher (67 years, 62 days)
- Youngest champion: Carly Colón (20 years,21 days)
- Heaviest champion: Mabel (485 lb (220 kg))
- Lightest champion: Mr. 450 (182 lb (83 kg))

The WWC Universal Heavyweight Championship is a professional wrestling world heavyweight championship and the top title contested for in the Puerto Rican professional wrestling promotion, the World Wrestling Council. The championship was established in July 1982, as the WWC World Heavyweight Championship, when the company was named Capitol Sports Promotions.

The championship received its current name following a match between Carlos Colón (WWC World Heavyweight Champion) and Ric Flair (NWA World Heavyweight Champion) where the "Champion of the Universe" was supposed to be determined. The first champion was Abdullah the Butcher, who was billed as champion upon the title's creation. Since being established, the WWC Universal Heavyweight Championship has been held by forty-nine different wrestlers and has also been held up on nineteen occasions and vacated or stripped thirteen times.

== History ==
=== Early history ===
The WWC Universal Heavyweight Championship was first introduced as the WWC World Heavyweight Championship, when it was awarded to Abdullah the Butcher, after he won a "tournament" that supposedly took place in Japan. The tournament was part of a storyline and was used to relate to Abdullah's previous run in All Japan Pro Wrestling. Three days later Carlos Colón became the first local wrestler to win the championship. During the championship's first years Colón would defend the championship successfully against several international wrestlers, only losing it when a "feud angle" was being promoted.

During December 1983, Capitol Sports Promotions gave a significant amount of promotion to an angle between Ric Flair and Carlos Colón. At the moment when the feud happened Colón was the WWC World Heavyweight Champion and Flair was the NWA World Heavyweight Champion. The angle included a spot where Flair would criticize Capitol's championship, claiming that he was the only "real world champion". This led to a match on December 18, 1983 where both wrestlers competed in an event organized at Bayamón, Puerto Rico. The match was billed as a fight to determine the "undisputed champion of the Universe", and it took place inside a steel cage. Flair lost the match and Colón was declared the "undisputed champion of the Universe", in the process the championship was renamed to WWC Universal Heavyweight Championship. It is alleged that on February 27, 1985, for the first time that the championship's holder changed outside of Puerto Rico, when Dory Funk, Jr. won it in Bangor, Maine on an ICW show. However, results for this show appeared in the Friday, March 1, 1985 edition of the Bangor Daily News. Results show Carlos Colon winning a non-title match against "Toras Balboa" (subbing for the advertised Black Gordman), and Dory Funk Jr wrestling to a draw with Hercules Ayala. So the date of Funk winning the title from Colon is unknown. After a rematch ended in a draw, the title was held up for the first time since its foundation. After Colón defeated Flair, he would go on several undefeated streaks; this lasted until Funk "injured" him in a match. This event led to the championship being vacated for the first time.

He subsequently competed in a tournament to determine the new champion where he won it for a fifth time. After this he was involved in an angle where Hercules Ayala turned on him and won the championship. This led to the organization of several matches, before he won it on a rematch. Sadistic Steve Strong was the next champion, upon his entrance to the company he was billed as a "satanic heel". Both wrestlers traded the title until it was held up and won by Colón (in what marked his tenth title reign) who held it until December 17, 1989, when he lost it to Leo Burke.

Following this Burke would go on to feud with Juan Rivera who at the time was referred to as "TNT". Both wrestlers had been involved in a mid-card feud prior to this. Rivera won the championship on February 9, 1990, eventually losing it to Abdullah the Butcher, who lost it to Colón. The title was held up numerous times in 1991, as part of feuds between Colón, Greg Valentine and Dino Bravo.

=== Ray González and Colón family (1994–2005) ===
On August 1, 1993, Colón announced that he was retiring, vacating the championship in the process. Following this a tournament was scheduled to determine a new champion. On August 8, 1993, the final took place when Greg Valentine defeated Invader #1 to become the new champion, which led to a feud between both men. During this time Invader was part of the booking team and was interested in giving Ray González a push as the company's top face. Then on April 24, 1994, Invader was supposed to challenge Valentine for the championship but was replaced by González following an "injury". González won the match and became the champion in an unexpected result. González wasn't well received as a face and subsequently lost the championship to Dutch Mantel on June 22, 1994. This led to an angle between Mantel and Colón, who won the championship a sixteenth time. He was subsequently involved in a feud with Mabel, in which both wrestlers had a reign, which Colón eventually ended with Abdullah the Butcher winning the championship and engaging in a feud with Bronco, who won the championship on March 23, 1996. This led to a feud with Colón, who defeated Bronco in a retirement vs. deportation match. After this Colón retained the championship, with it being held up once during this period. On June 25, 1996, Jesús Castillo, Jr. won the title while working a tour in Puerto Rico. Castillo dropped the title to Colón on the last date of this tour. Colón was then involved in angles with El Nene and Jim Steele with both of them winning the title once before dropping it back. Following this Colón announced a semi-retirement and vacated the championship. A tournament was held with González winning it again.

During this run Ray was pushed and his adversaries tried to put him over. This was followed by an angle where González and Colón would experience trouble and after González lost and regained the title against El Nene, both had a feud where Colón won the championship for a twenty-third time, but ended up losing it back to Ray the following day. González defended the title until November 26, 1998, when Glamour Boy Shane won it, losing it to González two days after. Over the course of three months Ray lost and regained the title against Colón again. This year the World Wrestling Council ran an invasion angle where personnel from Lucha Libre AAA World Wide (AAA) wrestled in the company; this led to a feud between Pierroth, Jr. and González. Both of them faced each other in a hair vs. mask match for the championship, where González won and Pierroth was forced to remove his mask. The following day Pierroth won the championship; this feud ended in a "loser leaves WWC" match that González won and thus became champion for a ninth time. Soon after this González was involved in an angle where Carly Colón made his debut in wrestling, eventually helping Colón win the championship for the last occasion in his career.

González would win the championship back on January 6, 2000. This was followed by an angle that saw Carly win the title. The feud continued with González bringing foreign wrestlers to challenge him for the title, among whom were Curt Hennig and Jerry Flynn, who won the title eventually losing it to Bronco, who lost to Ray shortly after. González was then involved in a feud where he retained against El Super Gladiador, during which the title was held up once. Carly won the championship back on the last show of 2001, which took place on December 1, 2001. This time he feuded with Vampiro who won the title once, with the title being subsequently held up and finally being won by Colón again. After this he was involved with Konnan who won and dropped the championship in a day. By this time González left WWC and Carly was matched against Chicky Starr who won the championship and had a short run until losing it back. Carly's final feud before signing with World Wrestling Entertainment was against Sabu with both men trading the championship once.

When Carly left to Ohio Valley Wrestling a tournament was scheduled, where Lightning won the championship. He feuded with Thunder for some time and would go on to lose the championship to El Diamante on September 13, 2003. Diamante lost the championship, losing it to Carly who was on a temporal stay with the company and then losing it to Abdullah the Butcher on the final days of his stay. The wrestler didn't defend the title many times, however, and it was vacated. Bronco won a tournament organized for the championship and lost it to Eddie Colón, leading to a feud between both. Eddie was pushed and defended against Jim Steele, Abyss and Abdullah the Butcher with the championship being held up only once. This led to a feud with El Diamante where both traded the championship before El Diamante left the company. During this time Bryan debuted with the company and won the championship shortly after, getting involved in a feud with Glamour Boy Shane, who won it on the company's Aniversario event on November 6, 2005.

=== The IWA's unification of the "Capitol World Heavyweight Championship" ===
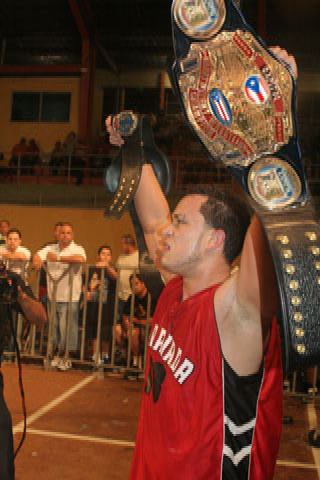
Blitz holds the championships, with the "Capitol Heavyweight Championship" on the foreground

On December 15, 2007, Scott Hall failed to attend a title defense which led to the fictional box and wrestling commission's decision to vacate the championship and award it to the number one contender, who at the moment was Miguel "Biggie Size" Maldonado. On December 29, 2007, the Universal championship was announced as "held-up" following the events where he was declared the champion following Hall's absence to Lockout. The commission's decision was announced during the company's holiday recess and Maldonado still retained physical possession of the championship belt. On January 6, 2008, Jack Meléndez, who had been managing La Rabia, the stable where he performed, abandoned the company citing differences with the company's personnel. Following Meléndez's exit from the company, La Rabia abandoned the company as well, no-showing the special event scheduled for January 6, 2008. That same night, Maldonado appeared at the International Wrestling Association's Histeria Boricua event, with the championship belt still in his possession and challenged Freddie "Blitz" Lozada, the current IWA World Heavyweight Champion to a unification match. The match took place later in the event with Lozada winning both belts. Following this match WWC's merchandise manager, José Roberto Rodríguez, who had been allowed entry into the building, demanded that the belt was returned to him. However, by this time, the IWA's personnel had replaced the belt with Revolution X-Treme Wrestling's championship belt (which was in Savio Vega's possession) and had transferred the Universal Championship to a secure location. This led to a discussion between personnel from both companies and Rodríguez's expulsion from the event. After the event's conclusion, police officers were contacted but the IWA retained physical possession of the championship. The belt was returned to WWC personnel following an ultimatum, which claimed that the company would take legal action if it wasn't returned within forty-eight hours. However, both the International Wrestling Association and the National Wrestling Alliance recognized the unification match, considering Lozada the first Undisputed World Heavyweight Champion in Puerto Rico.

=== Tournament and redesign ===
WWC organized a tournament to determine the next champion. Eliminatories for this event lasted for six months, using a points system to select the finalists.

The final was scheduled for July 19, 2008, as part of Aniversario 2008, with Daniel Torres (otherwise known as Noriega) and Orlando Colón advancing to it. A new belt (designed by Mike Nicolau) was introduced, while the former design was awarded to Carlos Colón, who held a retirement ceremony earlier in the event. Torres won the tournament, defeating Colón by pinfall.

=== Second IWA exile and reunification ===
After 36 days with the title, Torres left the company while still the champion and retaining physical possession of the belt, signing a contract with a promotion named Extreme Wrestling Organization, who was in association with a publicity company known as Wrestle Event, which facilitated the loan of large facilities. Shortly after, EWO's partnership with Wrestle Event dissolved and Torres joined the IWA, appearing in a backstage segment with the title, which was concealed in a black bag. During his next appearance, the distinctive strap of the belt was exposed outside the pouch, but the plaque remained hidden from view. Torres also addressed the crowd, stating that he was "collecting titles" and had arrived to the promotion because "the title in [his] possession was worthless because it was unified ten months [before]", prior to unsuccessfully challenging the IWA Undisputed Champion.

This forced WWC to return to the former design, with Ray González being the first to claim it in order to fill the vacancy. At Aniversario 2009, Torres returned to the company and removed the redesigned belt from the black bag that held it, being subsequently booked in an angle with the holder of the original belt, Ángel "BJ" Rosado. A first unification match was held at Summer Madness, with both titles being held up following a controversial finish. On September 26, 2009, Torres was booked to defeat Rosado, winning both belts and unifying the title, holding it for a day before dropping them to Shane Sewell. On November 1, 2009, Sewell and the incumbent IWA Undisputed World Heavyweight Champion, Joe Bravo, performed in a Dominican Wrestling Entertainment event, with Bravo's DWE Dominican National Championship being held up after the creative team booked a no contest. This marked the first instance that the two major champions worked together while holding full recognition by both promotions.

=== Talent exchange and other alliances ===
Throughout 2012 the title made appearances in Brooklyn-based Fighting Spirit Wrestling (FSW), represented by Gilbert Cruz (who also held the FSW World Heavyweight Championship during this timeframe and carried both belts) and by Germán Figueroa (as Apollo), also being featured in a champion vs. champion match between both. The title has also been acknowledged in another New York metropolitan area promotion, Amaro Productions, being referred to as the "WWC Campeon de Universal" while promoting a tour featuring former champion Figueroa in 2013. In 2014, during its brief alliance with the World Wrestling League (WWL), WWC allowed some of its talent to participate in cards held abroad by that promotion, while the Universal Championship would be promoted by the former in its media presentations of Shane Sewell and José Torres.

=== International exposition and defenses (2015–present) ===
On April 4, 2015, John Yurnet (otherwise known as Mr. 450 or Jesús de León) made an appearance in WWC and issued a challenge for the Universal Heavyweight Championship in the main event of Camino a la Gloria. However, the match ended without a clear winner and Carlos "Chicano" Cotto retained. The series between both peaked in a cage match, which Yurnet won to become the 50th Universal Heavyweight Champion. At Aniversario 2015, he defeated Carly Colón to retain. During his reign as champion, Yurnet would wear the belt in his appearances outside of Puerto Rico, carrying it with him in matches throughout the independent circuit of the United States and Canada. In an interview with WrestleZone, he explained that his intention was to give the title the foreign exposition that it had when Carlos Colón and Dory Funk feuded over it in the NWA territories and that he wanted people to feel "[that] this guy is going over to Japan with the belt and representing the island there. [...] This guy is going to Ecuador and he's representing there." On October 16, 2015, he debuted in Caution Wrestling Federation (CWF) by successfully defending the Universal Heavyweight Championship against masked luchador Zoom Driver, marking the first time that the title had been on the line in Mexican territory.

After this reign was concluded, his successor Carly Colón (now performing as Carlito Caribbean Cool) and the title were featured prominently in promotions for Wrestling Superstars' MysterioMania tour in Chile. Another aspect of this initiative included contracting foreign figures to challenge for the title in WWC, highlighted by a defense against Rey Mysterio.

== Belt designs ==
The classic design of the belt referenced its origin as a NWA title by adopting the overall design of the NWA Mid-Atlantic United States Heavyweight Championship, albeit with several modifications. The central design that prominently features an eagle was left intact, however, the belt replaced all references to the latter's regional nature by removing all depictions relating to the United States in general. Among the most prominent changes was the replacement of the flag of the United States present on top of the eagle in the NWA Mid-Atlantic title with a representation of two wrestlers locked in a grappling hold, and the replacement of a political map of the United States that was found in an oval located under the eagle's feet with a globe. Another attempt to distance it from its regional inspiration was the removal of an "NWA" inscription on the top of the place, with the Universal Championship featuring a mantling design instead.

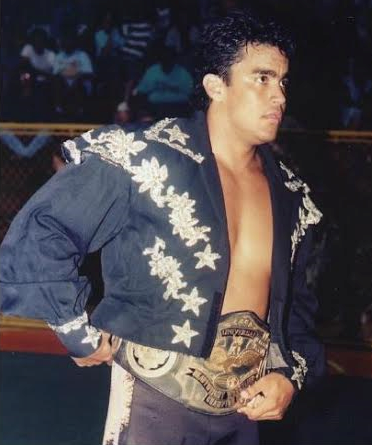
Ray González with the classic title belt.

The NWA Mid-Atlantic title's prominent "United States" inscription was replaced with the word "Universal", written in a slightly different font from its inspiration. Besides these changes, the plaque's design remains consistent with its source, with the only remaining difference being the placement of a set of screws. The main side plates remained round and proportional to its inspiration but were entirely redesigned, with the United States shield being abandoned for a depiction of two wrestlers in mid-hold decorated with mantling. The smaller side plates featured depictions of a royal crown with similar mantling, instead of the scene of two wrestlers struggling before a United States shield and the NWA logo. The belt itself was black, similar to the NWA Mid-Atlantic United States Heavyweight Championship. The plaque and design was used constantly for nearly three decades, with the only notable changes being that the banners and other decorations were changed from its original black coloration to red and that the globe design that was originally golden was painted blue where the water bodies should be.

WWC commissioned a new belt design to Top Rope Belts in 2008, with the company creating a new template and design to create "something special". The new plaques were created to preserve a "classic feel to [them]" as noted by the manufacturer, which can be discerned with the re-design and relocation of several elements of the classic plaques, such as the eagle (now two smaller eagles flanking a much larger globe), the scene of wrestlers in a hold (now the central element and "stacked" over the globe), its coloration (the new scheme is black, red and blue, unifying both of the classic combinations) and the stars that were originally present in the main banner (which were now distributed throughout the main plaque). The side main side plaques present a modern depiction of the classic's wrestling match. WWC's current logo, adopted in the early 2000s, is now featured prominent on top of the main plaque and in the smaller side plaques. The belt was officially introduced in July 2008, with the first holder being determined in that year's Aniversario event.

== Reigns ==
WWC currently recognizes 150 individual Universal Heavyweight Championship reigns.

Carlos Colón, Sr. holds the record with twenty-six championships and also holds the record for most cumulative days as champion, totaling 3,945 days. His second reign is the longest in the history of the title, as he held the title for 655 days. Three wrestlers are tied for the shortest reign in history, with all three lasting less than one day, these are Carly Colón's 11th reign and Vampiro and Lance Hoyt's lone reigns. Unofficially, BJ is recognized as the youngest wrestler to win the championship at 20 years and 357 days. However, for storyline purposes, Ray González's reign at 21 years and 355 days is credited with this feat.

== See also ==
- Professional wrestling in Puerto Rico
