= Shane Sewell =

Canadian professional wrestler and referee (born 1972)

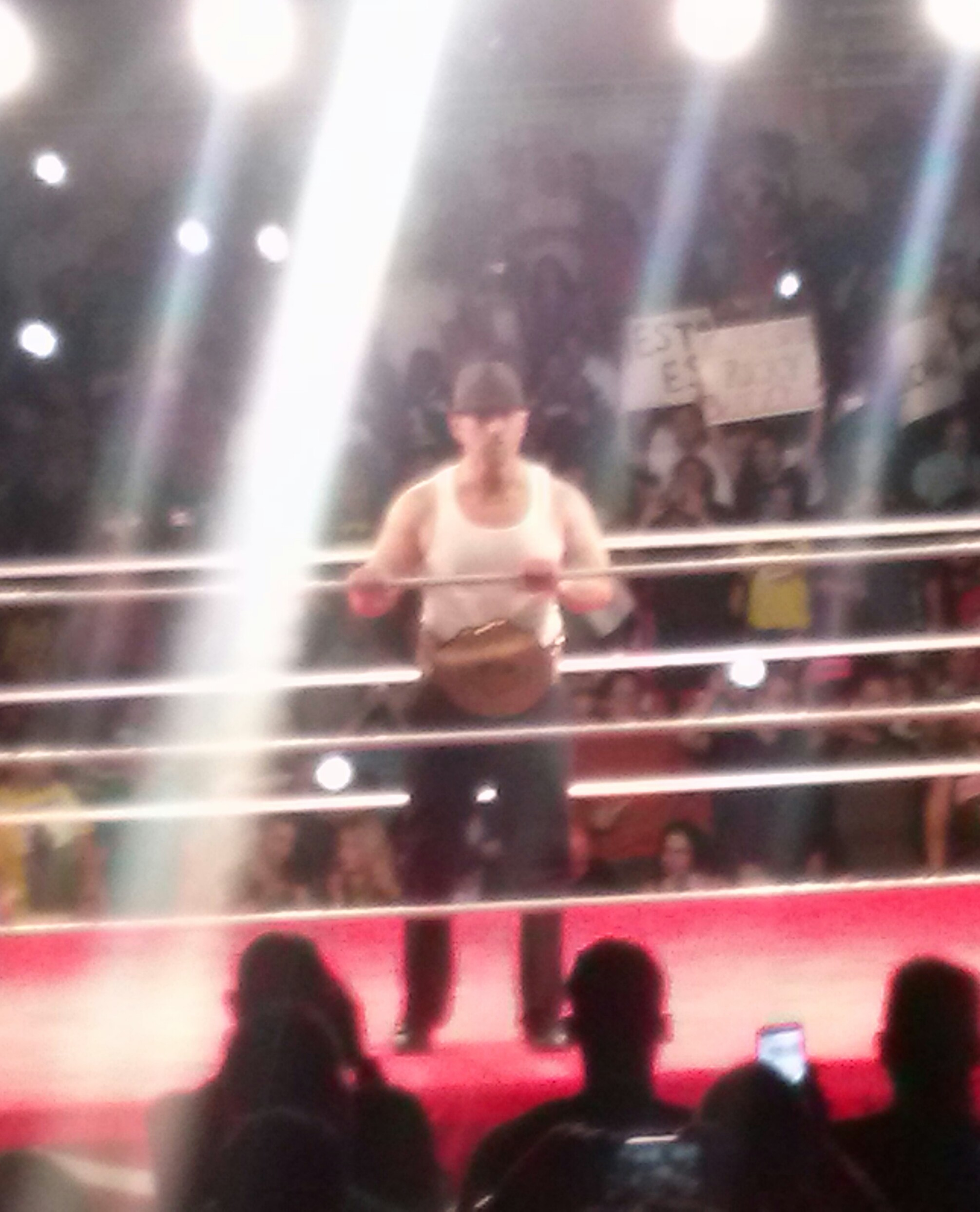

Personal information
- Born: September 5, 1972 (age 54) Toronto, Ontario, Canada

Professional wrestling career
- Ring name(s): Shane The Glamour Boy; Glamour Boy Shane; Shane Sewell; Shane
- Billed height: 6 ft 0 in (1.83 m)
- Billed weight: 230 lb (100 kg)
- Billed from: Toronto, Ontario, Canada
- Debut: 1989

Shane Sewell (born September 5, 1972) is a Canadian professional wrestler and referee. He has worked for the World Wrestling Council, the International Wrestling Association and Total Nonstop Action Wrestling as both a referee and wrestler. Sewell is a fourteen-time World Heavyweight Champion, having won the IWA Undisputed World Unified Heavyweight Championship ten times, the WWC Universal Heavyweight Championship three times, and the WWL World Heavyweight Championship one time. By winning the IWA, WWC, and WWL World Heavyweight Championships, Sewell won the three world titles from three top promotions in Puerto Rico.

== Professional wrestling career ==
=== World Wrestling Council (1995–2000) ===
During the mid 1990s Sewell formed a tag team with Glamour Boy Sean they were known as the Canadian Glamour Boys. Together they won the WWC World Tag Team Championships twice before going their own way. Sewell also became a three time WWC Television Champion on separate occasions. After two years out of the tag team division Sewell won the vacant WWC World Tag Team Championships for a third time teaming with Ricky Santana.

=== International Wrestling Association (2000–2005) ===
Sewell debuted in the IWA days after leaving WWC in a run-in to help Savio Vega as he was being double-teamed by Miguel Perez and Jesus Castillo in Carolina, Puerto Rico. He became the company's first World Heavyweight Champion on October 28, 2000 in Bayamon, Puerto Rico. He started a notable feud in December 2001 when Vega returned and unified with Starr Corporation and attacked both Sewell and Ricky Banderas forming Los Hermanos en Dolor (Brothers in Pain). In December 2004, Sewell turned heel with Vega after he won the Heavyweight title from Ray Gonzalez at Christmas in Puerto Rico. He lost the title to Chicano at Juicio Final on April 2, 2005 in Caguas, Puerto Rico and after that teamed with Jean-Pierre Lafitte part-time. Sewell returned to the IWA in 2008 with former TNA stars Ricky Vega and The Naturals as well as veteran stalwart Big Vito. Sewell tagged with Vega for a time before Vega turned heel and became undisputed IWA heavyweight champion. The two former partners would meet several times after, with Sewell falling short of the title he helped make famous.

=== Time split between WWC and IWA (2005–2006) ===
Sewell wrestled part-time in then-new Puerto Rican federation New Wrestling Stars. During his time in the company, as part of a talent exchange with the WWC, he won the WWC Universal Heavyweight Championship title from "La Amenaza" Bryan in Mayagüez, Puerto Rico on November 5, 2005, which made Sewell the first wrestler to win both the top titles in both IWA and WWC in a calendar year. He lost the Universal title to Bryan on February 12, 2006 and split his time with both companies. Sewell later feuded with Tim Arson over the NWS Heavyweight title until June 3, 2006 when he lost a Title vs. Leave The Company match.

When the New Wrestling Stars promotion folded, he made his IWA return on Impacto Total on August 19, 2006 in an angle with Miguel Perez Jr. in his office saying the Glamour Boy is ready to return. Later that night in Caguas, Puerto Rico, Sewell, under the masked gimmick Mr. GPR ran in and helped Perez Jr., Ray Gonzalez, Thunder and Lightning clear of the ring of Savio Vega's La Compania before Sewell unmasked himself. Sewell won the Heavyweight title in a three-way match from Gonzalez and Lightning at IWA Christmas in Puerto Rico on December 9, 2006 for a record ninth time. He has been making part-time appearances for WWC since 2008.

=== Total Nonstop Action Wrestling (2008–2009) ===
Sewell began working for Total Nonstop Action Wrestling to help develop and train upcoming wrestlers while (at the time) also appearing as a referee on Impact!. He first made a mark in TNA by defending himself after Sheik Abdul Bashir took exception to being defeated after a restart in a match against Consequences Creed. Sewell quickly clotheslined Bashir over the top rope to the floor and had to be calmed down by referee Earl Hebner. Since the altercation, he had a number of brawls with wrestlers who shoved him while he was working as a referee.

On the November 13 episode of Impact! during an X Division Championship match between Eric Young and champion Sheik Abdul Bashir, Sewell stopped a three-count in noticing an illegal action on the part of Bashir, then asking the audience if Bashir had done so. Bashir then shoved Sewell to the mat, causing him to remove his referee shirt and begin attacking Bashir. As a result, Young hit a Death Valley Driver on Bashir and won the match, becoming the new X Division Champion. However, the decision was reversed one week later by Jim Cornette due to Sewell's interference. A similar incident occurred at Final Resolution, where Bashir shoved Sewell and he retaliated by kicking Bashir's feet off the top rope, thus causing him to be pinned by Young. Bashir then attacked Sewell and busted him open in the process.

On January 8, 2009, Sewell was (kayfabe) fired as an official after another confrontation with Bashir. However, as part of the confrontation, Cornette announced that Sewell would be hired as a wrestler and face Bashir at TNA's pay-per-view event Genesis, which Sewell won. Sewell apparently was allowed to officiate matches again, as on the Impact! following Genesis, he officiated Hernandez's disqualification loss against Sting. After having a number of confrontations with Booker T, Cornette announced that at Against All Odds, Booker would defend his Legends Championship against Sewell. At Against All Odds, Sewell was defeated in his first and only championship match in TNA. On the March 26 episode of Impact!, Sewell took part in a Captain's Gauntlet match, but was quickly eliminated by Kurt Angle. On May 22, 2009, it was confirmed that Sewell had been released from the company.

=== Return to WWC ===
After being released from TNA, Sewell worked the June 25 tapings of Florida Championship Wrestling, before returning to WWC. Soon after returning, Sewell competed in several matches for the Puerto Rico Heavyweight and Universal Heavyweight Championships, but was unable to win either title. On August 8, Sewell defeated Idol Stevens for the Puerto Rico Title. After two successful title defenses, Sewell lost the title to Orlando Colón on September 29. On September 27, Sewell defeated Noriega, BJ and Orlando Colón to win the Unified Universal Title for the third time. Sewell continued his feud with Colón by defeating him in a match for the Universal Title on October 17. He would go on to lose the title to Noriega on November 28, 2009. Sewell returned to the promotion thirteen months later, interfering in a match between Carly Colón and Ricky Banderas, costing Colón the Universal Heavyweight Championship and reforming Los Hermanos en Dolor.

=== Various promotions ===
Shane Sewell returned to the IWA for their Christmas in PR event, but left after Juicio Final to appear in the PRWA (Puerto Rico Wrestling Association) in April 2010. On October 18, 2014, at WWL Insurrection, Sewell defeated Monster Pain to win the WWL World Heavyweight Championship. He lost the title to Alberto el Patron in January 2015 at WWL's Three Kings Day holiday event in a three-way match that also included Ricky Banderas.

== Personal life ==
Sewell owns and operates a wrestling school in Caguas, Puerto Rico.

== Championships and accomplishment ==
- International Wrestling Association
  - IWA Hardcore Championship (7 times)
  - IWA Intercontinental Championship (2 times)
  - IWA Undisputed World Heavyweight Championship (10 times)
  - IWA World Tag Team Championship (4 times) – with D'Lo Brown (1), Ricky Banderas (1), KC James (1) and Abyss (1)
- Pro Wrestling Illustrated
  - PWI ranked him #224 of the top 500 singles wrestlers in the PWI 500 in 2011
- World Wrestling Council
  - WWC Intercontinental Heavyweight Championship (2 times)
  - WWC Puerto Rico Heavyweight Championship (3 times)
  - WWC Television Championship (7 times)
  - WWC Universal Heavyweight Championship (3 times)
  - WWC World Tag Team Championship (3 times) – with Glamour Boy Sean (2) and Ricky Santana (1)
- World Wrestling League
  - WWL World Heavyweight Championship (1 time)
