= Candice LeRae =

American professional wrestler (born 1985)

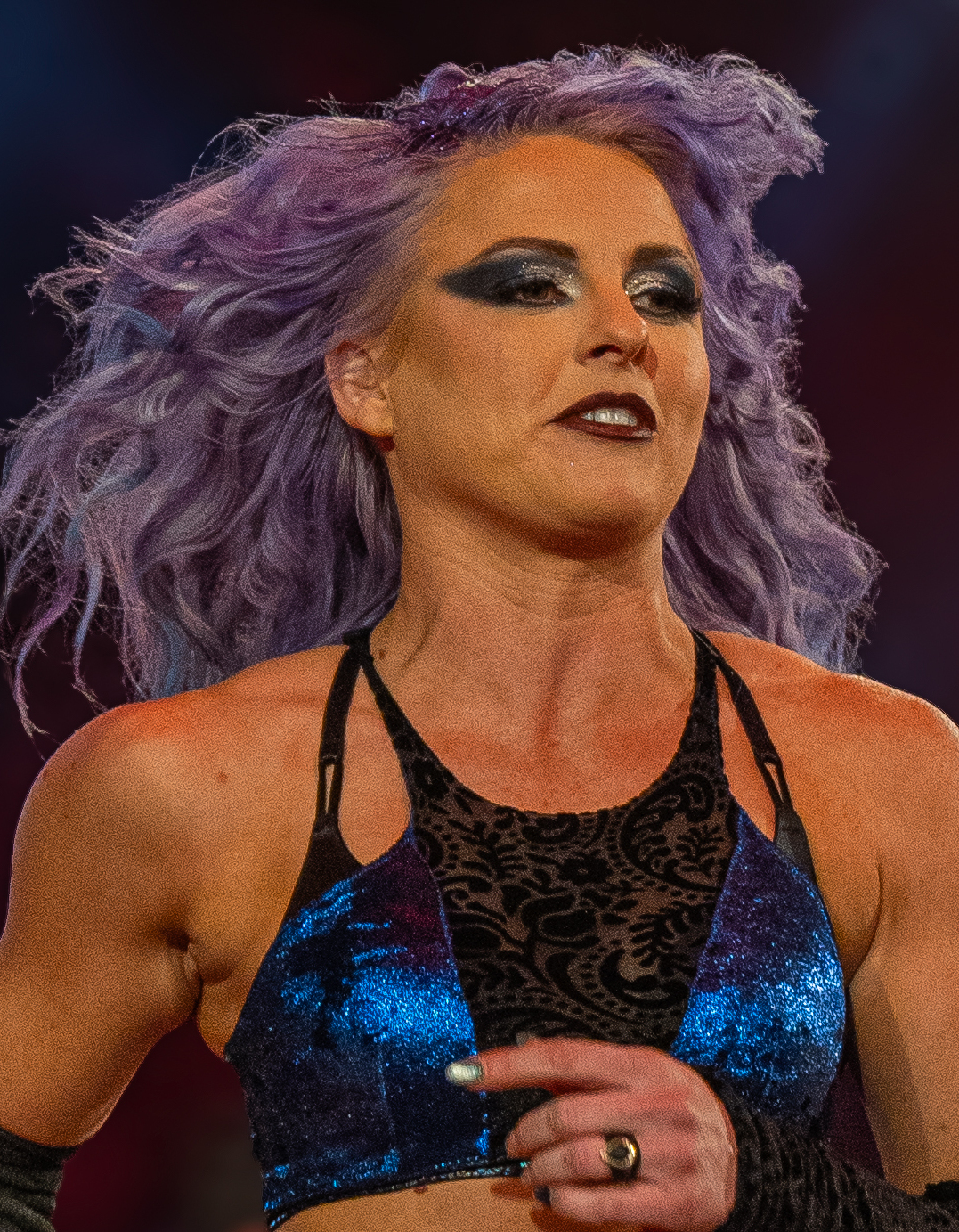
- LeRae in 2025

Personal information
- Born: Candice LeRae; September 29, 1985 (age 41) Riverside, California, U.S.
- Spouse: Johnny Gargano (m. 2016)
- Children: 1

Professional wrestling career
- Ring name(s): Candice LeRae; Robyn
- Billed height: 1.58 m (5 ft 2 in)
- Billed weight: 110 lb (50 kg)
- Billed from: Anaheim, California; Riverside, California; Winnipeg, Manitoba, Canada; Mr. Toad's Wild Ride
- Trained by: Bill Anderson; Jesse Hernandez; T. J. Perkins; WWE Performance Center
- Debut: 2002

Candice LeRae (born September 29, 1985) is an American professional wrestler. As of 2022, she is signed to WWE, where she performs on the SmackDown brand.

LeRae began her professional wrestling career in 2002, working for the Empire Wrestling Federation (EWF) promotion until 2006. Over the following years, she competed in various promotions on the independent circuit, including Combat Zone Wrestling (CZW), Total Nonstop Action Wrestling (TNA), Shimmer Women Athletes, DDT Pro-Wrestling, and Pro Wrestling Guerrilla (PWG), where she is a one-time PWG World Tag Team Champion, making her the only female title holder in the promotion's history. Other titles she held include the Ironman Heavymetalweight Championship and the FWE Women's Championship.

After competing at the inaugural Mae Young Classic in 2017, LeRae signed with WWE in early 2018 and debuted for the NXT brand, where she became involved in her husband Johnny Gargano's feuds before becoming a singles competitor. In 2020, LeRae joined Gargano, Indi Hartwell, and Austin Theory to form the villainous faction The Way, until it dissolved the following year. She left the company in May 2022 but returned in September that year.

== Early life ==
Candice LeRae was born and raised in Riverside, California. She grew up watching professional wrestling with her two brothers and fell in love with the profession. After being in a marching band where she played flute and piccolo, LeRae went to an unspecified college and earned a degree in culinary arts, and worked at Universal Studios Hollywood as a baker for a few years.

Numerous outlets list her as being born in Winnipeg, Manitoba, Canada. According to LeRae, this misconception is due to a decision made by an indie promoter early in her wrestling career. The promoter in question did not perceive LeRae as a viable heel, so in an attempt to generate heat, she was billed as a Canadian.

== Professional wrestling career ==
=== Early career (2002–2005) ===
LeRae spent the first two years of her career wrestling for the Empire Wrestling Federation (EWF) and the International Wrestling Council. She appeared as a substitute in a round one match at the ChickFight tournament in 2004, replacing the injured Miss Chevius, but lost in the first round to Princess Sugey. During 2005, LeRae was a mainstay in the EWF, facing wrestlers including Hurricane Havana, Kid Omega, and Amazing Kong. She continued competing for the promotion throughout 2006, while also wrestling for All-Pro Wrestling and Ground Zero Wrestling. 2007 saw LeRae branch out to the Midwestern United States, where she competed for Insanity Pro Wrestling and Ring of Honor (ROH). LeRae had two matches for ROH in August 2007, losing to Sara Del Rey and Daizee Haze in dark matches on August 10 and 24, respectively.

LeRae began wrestling for the Alternative Wrestling Show (AWS) promotion in December 2007. In May 2009, she participated in a tournament for the AWS Women's Championship; she defeated Kitana Vera and Christina Von Eerie en route to the final, where she defeated Erica D'Erico and Morgan in a three-way match for the vacant championship. She successfully defended the title against Carla Jade, Nikki, and Von Eerie until September 6, when she lost the championship to Von Eerie.

She also appeared for the National Wrestling Alliance (NWA), and unsuccessfully challenged Amazing Kong for the NWA Women's Championship in 2008.

=== Pro Wrestling Guerrilla (2006–2016) ===
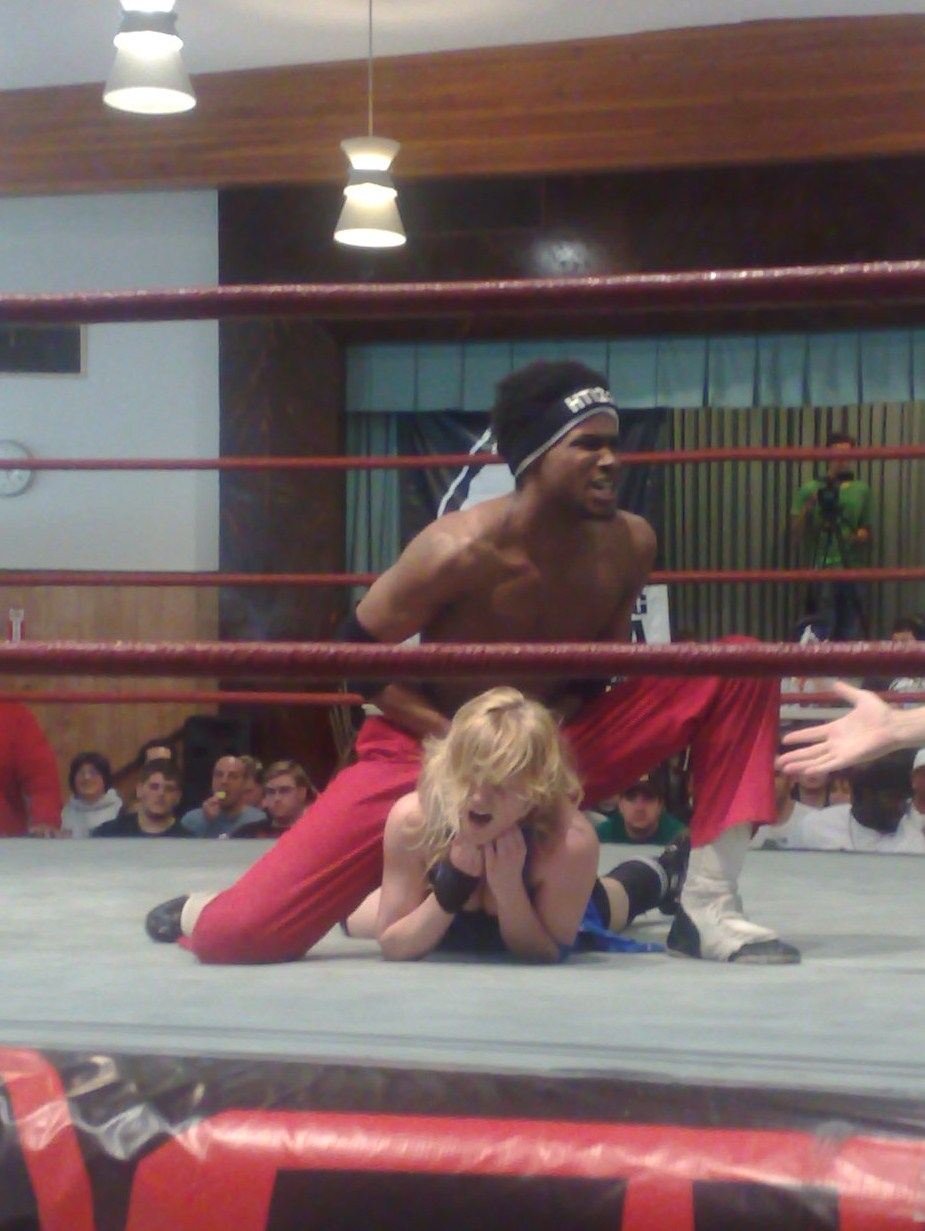
LeRae wrestling Human Tornado in February 2008

LeRae debuted in Pro Wrestling Guerrilla (PWG) in 2006, when she put together a team to face a team managed by Jade Chung in an eight-man tag team match, with fellow future WWE superstars Seth Rollins, Chris Hero, and Kevin Owens where her team was victorious. In April 2007, she returned as the valet of Human Tornado. Her first main storyline in the company began later that year in September; Tornado had been abusing LeRae, who stood up for herself and cost Tornado a match at the 2007 Battle of Los Angeles. After the match, Tornado began to attack LeRae, who was saved by Chris Hero. As a result, Hero and LeRae united to take on Tornado. In January 2008, Tornado, Claudio Castagnoli, and Eddie Kingston defeated LeRae, Hero, and Necro Butcher in a six-person match, which meant that LeRae was forced to face Tornado in a singles match the following night. LeRae lost the match by disqualification when Hero, who was banned from ringside, came to the ring to aid her. LuFisto entered the feud in March when she teamed with Tornado in a loss to LeRae and Hero. The following night, LeRae defeated LuFisto in a singles match. LeRae continued to be involved in the storyline between Hero and Tornado over the next few months.

LeRae spent the rest of the year in intergender competition, facing wrestlers including Adam Cole, Johnny Gargano, Tommaso Ciampa, Roderick Strong, John Morrison, T. J. Perkins and Chuck Taylor. In 2009, LeRae entered a feud with Christina Von Eerie when LeRae defeated Von Eerie in the first women's match in PWG in more than a year. Throughout early 2010, they teamed with a variety of male wrestlers to face each other, until LeRae defeated Von Eerie in a match in June to end the feud. At Kurt RussellReunion 2 in January 2011, LeRae was on the winning side of an eight-person tag team match. At PWG's DDT4 event on April 3, 2011, LeRae won a Joey Ryan invitational gauntlet match to advance to a number one contenders match for the PWG World Championship against Ryan later that same night, which she lost. She wrestled only sporadically in PWG in 2012 and 2013, mainly in six and eight-person tag team matches, which included being on the winning side of an eight-person tag team match at Kurt RussellReunion 3 in January 2012.

LeRae began teaming with Joey Ryan in October 2013, with a loss to The Young Bucks (Matt and Nick Jackson), and in January 2014 they participated in the 2014 Dynamite Duumvirate Tag Team Title Tournament, but were eliminated in the first round by Adam Cole and Kevin Steen. On March 28, 2014, at Mystery Vortex 2 LeRae unsuccessfully challenged Adam Cole for the PWG World Championship. On July 27, LeRae and Ryan defeated The Young Bucks in a Guerrilla Warfare match to win the PWG World Tag Team Championship. Known as the World's Cutest Tag Team, LeRae and Ryan made their first title defense on August 29 in a three-way match, defeating The Inner City Machine Guns (Rich Swann and Ricochet) and the team of Christopher Daniels and Frankie Kazarian. The following night, LeRae entered the 2014 Battle of Los Angeles tournament, where she defeated Rich Swann in the first round before losing to Johnny Gargano in the quarter-finals. LeRae and Ryan finished out the year with successful title defenses against Chuck Taylor and Johnny Gargano in October, and Daniels and Kazarian in December. LeRae and Ryan lost the championships to Monster Mafia (Ethan Page and Josh Alexander) on May 22, 2015, in the opening round of the 2015 DDT4. LeRae's final PWG match took place at Mystery Vortex IV, where she made a surprise appearance in a losing effort against Trent? on December 16, 2016.

=== DDT Pro-Wrestling (2016–2017) ===
LeRae debuted for Japanese promotion DDT Pro-Wrestling (DDT) on January 3, 2016, teaming with Joey Ryan to defeat Golden Storm Riders (Daisuke Sasaki and Suguru Miyatake). On January 10, LeRae teamed with the Golden Storm Riders in a losing effort against Happy Motel (Antonio Honda, Konosuke Takeshita and Tetsuya Endo). The following day, LeRae teamed with Sasaki once again, this time defeating T2Hii (Kazuki Hirata and Sanshiro Takagi). LeRae once again toured with DDT in March 2016, unsuccessfully challenging Sasaki and Shuji Ishikawa for the KO-D Tag Team Championship along with Joey Ryan on March 26 and defeating Makoto Oishi and Danshoku Dino the following day. LeRae returned to DDT in January 2017, losing to Sasaki on January 3, but teaming with Kouki Iwasaki and Kazusada Higuchi to defeat T2Hii (Sanshiro Takagi, Kazuki Hirata and Toru Owashi) on January 9. During her time with DDT, LeRae also infamously won the company's Heavymetalweight Championship by pinning Ryan in a dream sequence.

LeRae has also competed for DDT's all-female sister promotion Tokyo Joshi Pro Wrestling (TJPW), defeating Yuka Sakazaki in her debut on January 4, 2016 and losing to Mil Clown exactly one year later on January 4, 2017.

=== Other promotions (2011–2018) ===
In 2011, LeRae began competing for NWA Championship Wrestling from Hollywood, where she developed a feud with Buggy.

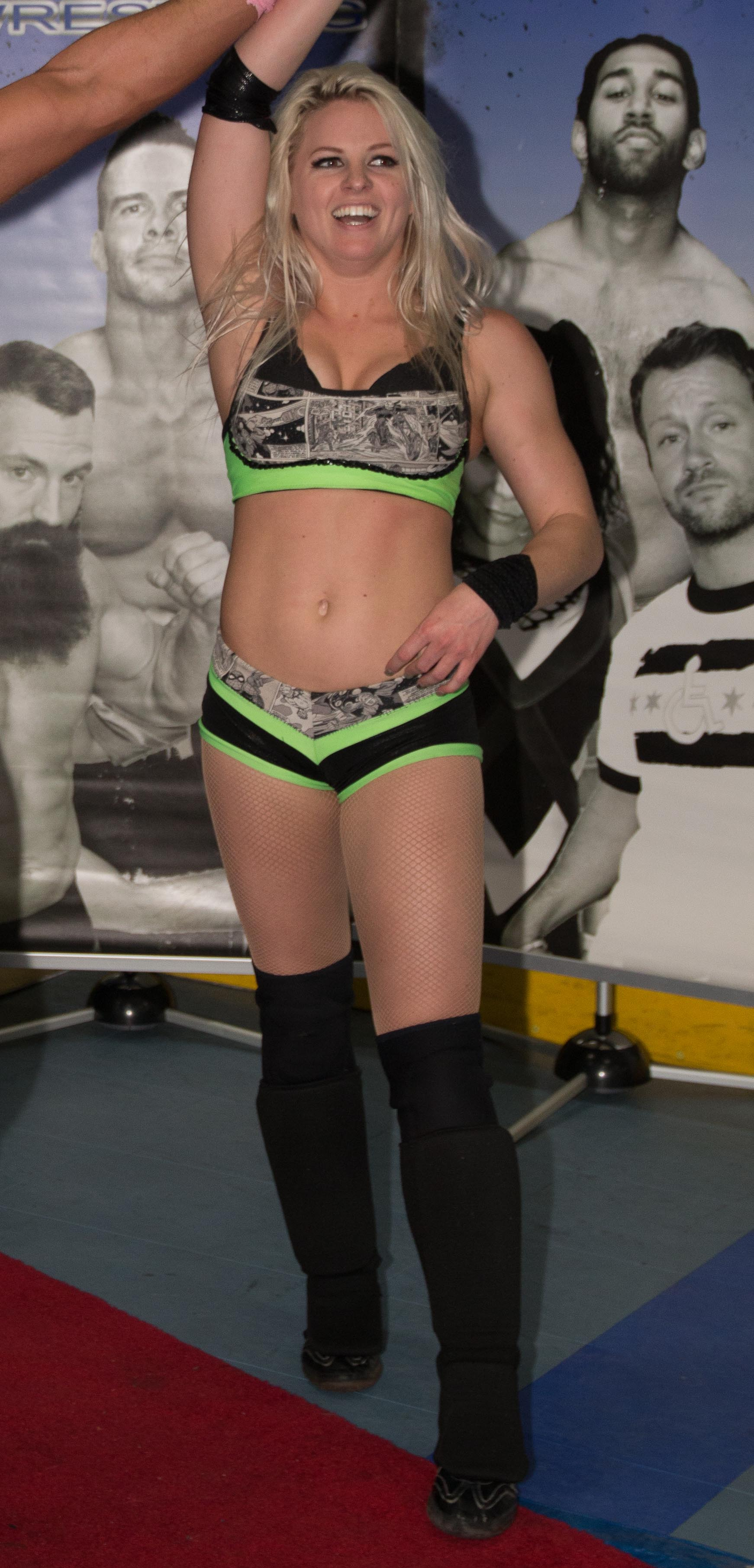
LeRae in 2014

In September 2013, LeRae debuted for Combat Zone Wrestling (CZW), teaming with Greg Excellent in a loss to Cherry Bomb and Pepper Parks. She returned to CZW in February 2014, losing a singles match to Kimber Lee. At Proving Grounds on May 10, she unsuccessfully challenged Shane Strickland for the CZW Wired Television Championship.

LeRae first began appearing for Family Wrestling Entertainment (FWE) in late 2013 as the mystery tag team partner of Joey Ryan at the Open Weight Grand Prix Final event. On October 3, LeRae and Ryan defeated Ivelisse Vélez and Tommy Dreamer at Refuelled Night One following interference from Drew Galloway. The next night at Refuelled Night Two, LeRae and Ryan defeated Christina Von Eerie and Carlito. Later the same night, LeRae issued a challenge to Ivelisse Vélez, and defeated her to win the FWE Women's Championship for the first time. She successfully defended the title against Veda Scott at No Limits in February 2015. The following month, LeRae and Ryan lost to Scott and Paul London in a mixed tag team match, in which LeRae lost the FWE Women's title to Scott.

LeRae appeared for Total Nonstop Action Wrestling (TNA) at Turning Point on November 21, 2013, in a losing effort to TNA Knockouts Champion Gail Kim.

On May 10, 2014, LeRae and Joey Ryan competed in the 2014 Women Superstars Uncensored (WSU) Queen and King of the Ring tournament, defeating the teams of Drew Gulak and Kimber Lee, and J. T. Dunn and Shelly Martinez to advance to the final, before being defeated by Matt Tremont and Mickie Knuckles. The following month, on June 7, 2014, she won Dream Wave Wrestling's Tag Team Championship with Ryan, but they lost the title the next day.

LeRae competed at Shimmer Women Athletes' Volume 62 taping in April 2014, losing to Athena. She returned to Shimmer in October, losing to Nikki Storm and Kay Lee Ray in singles matches on Volume 68 and Volume 70, respectively.

LeRae appeared for Full Impact Pro (FIP) on June 22, 2014, teaming with Ivelisse Vélez to unsuccessfully challenge The Lucha Sisters (Mia Yim and Leva Bates) for the Shine Tag Team Championship. She then made her debut for Shine Wrestling at Shine 20 on June 27, defeating Neveah.

LeRae made her first appearance on the December 14, 2016, episode of Ring of Honor Wrestling, in a losing effort against Deonna Purrazzo.

=== WWE ===
==== Beginnings in NXT (2017–2020) ====
On the May 3, 2017, episode of NXT, LeRae made her televised in-ring debut for WWE, participating in a #1 contender's battle royal for Asuka's NXT Women's Championship, but was unsuccessful after she was eliminated by Billie Kay. In July, she was announced as one of the participants for the Mae Young Classic tournament. LeRae defeated Renee Michelle in the first round and Nicole Savoy in the second round, but was eliminated in the quarterfinals by Shayna Baszler.

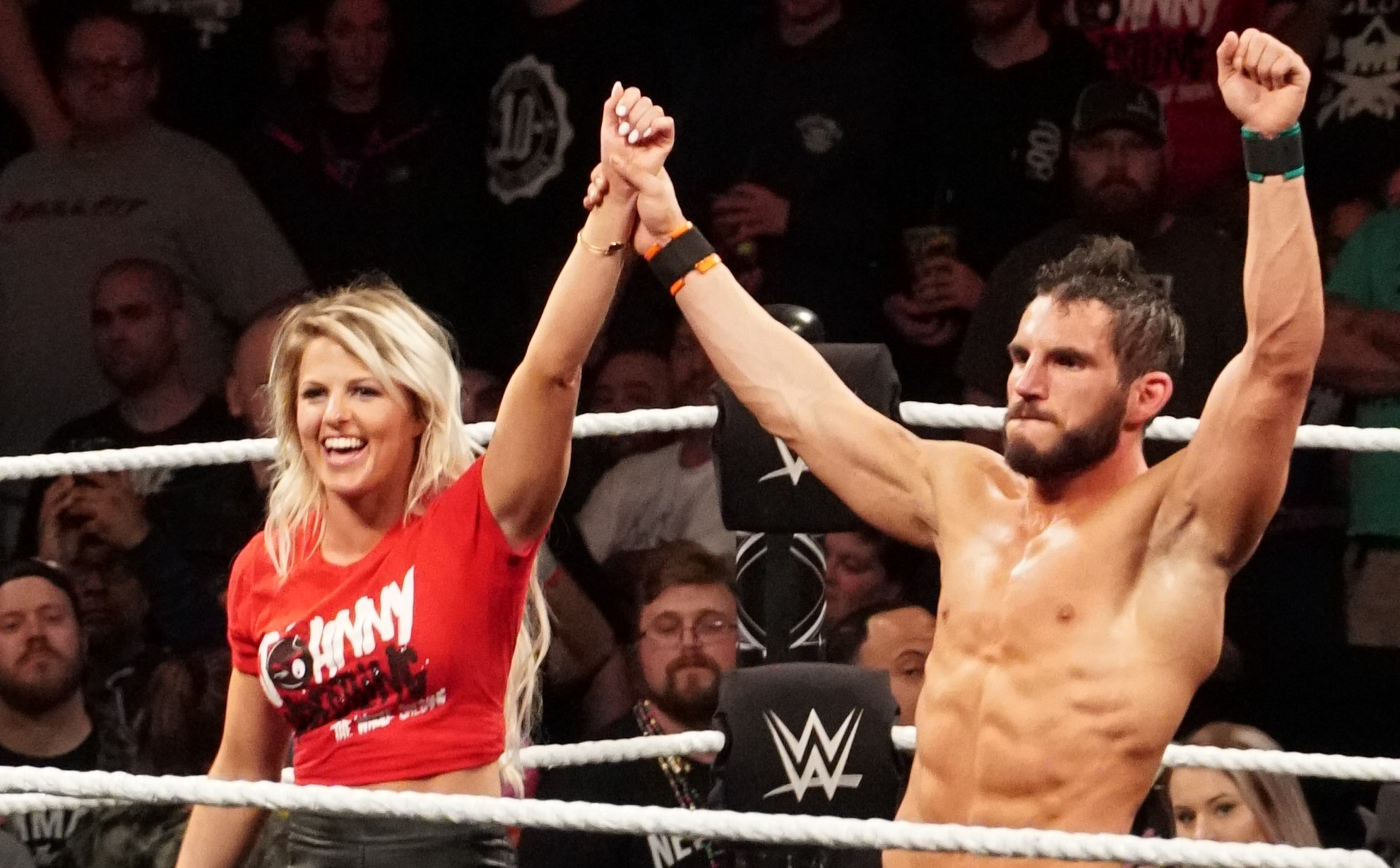
LeRae and Johnny Gargano at NXT TakeOver: New Orleans in April 2018

On January 16, 2018, WWE announced that LeRae had signed a contract with the company. She was inserted into her husband Johnny Gargano's feud with then-NXT Champion Andrade "Cien" Almas and his manager Zelina Vega as an equaliser from Vega's interferences and attacks during their matches. This led to a match between the two on the April 18 episode of NXT, which LeRae won. Two weeks later, now working as an active competitor, LeRae lost to Bianca Belair, suffering her first singles loss. In July, LeRae competed against Kairi Sane and Nikki Cross in a triple-threat #1 contender's match, which Sane won. After a few months of investigation, it was revealed that Gargano was the mystery attacker of Aleister Black, a storyline in which Nikki Cross was the witness. This sparked a match between LeRae and Cross, which Cross won. After a short hiatus, in what was her first appearance on the main roster, LeRae competed in her first women's Royal Rumble match at the Royal Rumble on January 27, 2019, entering at # 17 but was eliminated by Ruby Riott. A few months later on April 7, LeRae made her WrestleMania debut as she competed in the second WrestleMania Women's Battle Royal during the WrestleMania 35 pre-show, where she was eliminated by Asuka. On the April 11 episode of NXT, that was taped on NXT TakeOver: New York, LeRae returned to NXT, as she defeated Aliyah in her first match back.

In the end of May, LeRae aligned with Io Shirai who was feuding with Shayna Baszler and her allies Jessamyn Duke and Marina Shafir. The alliance between the two ended after a month, after Shirai lost to Baszler for a second time, despite LeRae's attempts to help her during their steel cage match. This led to a match between the two, that took place at NXT TakeOver: Toronto on August 10, where Shirai defeated LeRae. In September, LeRae was inserted in a fatal four-way match to determine the #1 contender to Shayna Baszler's NXT Women's Championship, which she won after pinning Mia Yim. LeRae received her title match on the October 2 episode of NXT, but lost. On November 23, at NXT TakeOver: WarGames, she competed in the first-ever Women's WarGames match as part of Rhea Ripley's team, where LeRae and Ripley secured the victory against Baszler's team. The next night at Survivor Series, LeRae competed as part of Team NXT, in the first-ever 5-on-5-on-5 Women's Survivor Series elimination match, where she was one of the survivors alongside Rhea Ripley and Io Shirai.

==== The Way (2020–2022) ====
On January 26, 2020, at the Royal Rumble, LeRae competed in the women's Royal Rumble match at #9, but was eliminated by Bianca Belair. On the April 8 episode of NXT, LeRae helped Johnny Gargano (who turned heel in February) defeat Tommaso Ciampa, thereby turning heel. On the April 29 episode of NXT, LeRae debuted a new look, titantron and entrance theme as she defeated Kacy Catanzaro. Gargano and LeRae began appearing together more frequently as a power couple as they feuded with Mia Yim and Keith Lee. At TakeOver: In Your House on June 7, LeRae, Dakota Kai and Raquel González lost to Mia Yim, Tegan Nox and Shotzi Blackheart. On July 8 at The Great American Bash, LeRae defeated Yim in a Street Fight.

On the September 23 episode of NXT, LeRae competed in a battle royal to determine the #1 contender for Io Shirai's NXT Women's Championship, which she won by eliminating Blackheart. LeRae teamed up with Gargano the following week in a "Champions vs. Challengers" tag team match against Shirai and Damian Priest, where the former were victorious. At NXT TakeOver 31 on October 4, LeRae failed to win the title. On the October 14 episode of NXT, LeRae was successful in gaining yet another NXT Women's Championship match at NXT: Halloween Havoc with a consecutive win over Blackheart. Facing off against champion Io Shirai in a renamed Tables, Ladders and Chairs match on October 28, LeRae once again failed to win the title, despite having been assisted by Indi Hartwell (then presented as a masked figure), who was stopped by Halloween Havoc host Blackheart. An incensed LeRae felt that Blackheart cost her the Women's Championship, so she swore revenge by stealing and destroying Blackheart's toy tank in front of her, leaving Blackheart an emotional wreck and kicking off a feud between the two. On the November 18 episode of NXT, it was announced that LeRae would lead one of the two women's teams (Team Candice) against that of Blackheart (Team Shotzi) in the second-ever women's WarGames match at NXT TakeOver: WarGames on December 6, where LeRae's team was victorious.

The following week on NXT, LeRae was featured in a segment alongside Gargano, Hartwell, and Austin Theory, in which they started referring to themselves as The Way – a stable consisting of the four. On the January 22, 2021, episode of 205 Live, LeRae and Hartwell defeated the team of Cora Jade and Gigi Dolin in the quarterfinals of the Women's Dusty Rhodes Tag Team Classic Tournament, which marked the first time that a women's match has ever taken place in the brand's history. On the May 4 episode of NXT, she and Indi Hartwell defeated Ember Moon and Shotzi Blackheart in a Street Fight to win the NXT Women's Tag Team Championship. On July 6, the pair would drop the titles to the newly-formed team of Io Shirai and Zoey Stark at the Great American Bash after the returning Tegan Nox attacked LeRae, costing her and Hartwell the championship. The Way would officially disband later that year, following the announcement of LeRae's pregnancy, the expiration of Gargano's contract with WWE, and Theory's call-up to the Raw brand. LeRae remained under contract with WWE while on maternity leave until May 6, 2022, when her contract expired after deciding not to renew it.

==== Various alliances (2022–present) ====
On the September 26, 2022, episode of Raw, LeRae returned to WWE as a face, defeating Nikki A.S.H.. On January 28, 2023, at the Royal Rumble, LeRae competed in the women's Royal Rumble match at #12, but was eliminated by Iyo Sky. After Hartwell's promotion to the main roster, LeRae reunited with Hartwell. On January 27, 2024, at the Royal Rumble, LeRae competed in the women's Royal Rumble match at #4, but was eliminated by Damage CTRL. At Elimination Chamber: Perth, LeRae and Hartwell challenged the WWE Women's Tag Team Champions The Kabuki Warriors for the titles in a losing effort. On the March 11 episode of Raw, LeRae showed a more aggressive side and in particular, taunted Maxxine Dupri over the death of her real-life brother, turning heel. On the night 2 of the 2024 WWE Draft, LeRae was drafted to SmackDown, with Indi Hartwell, together. At King and Queen of the Ring, LeRae and Hartwell lost another title match against the new tag team champions Bianca Belair and Jade Cargill. During the Speed tapings on October 4, 2024 (aired on October 9), LeRae defeated Iyo Sky to become the inaugural WWE Women's Speed Champion. On November 1, Hartwell was released from WWE, ending their team.

At Survivor Series: WarGames, LeRae, Nia Jax, Tiffany Stratton and The Judgment Day (Liv Morgan and Raquel Rodriguez) lost to Sky, Bayley, Bianca Belair, Naomi and Rhea Ripley in a WarGames match. On February 1, 2025, LeRae entered the Women's Royal Rumble at #23, but was eliminated by Trish Stratus. On the April 11 taping of Speed (airing April 16), LeRae lost the Women's Speed Championship to NXT's Sol Ruca, ending her reign at 189 days (194 days recognized by WWE). On the May 23, episode of SmackDown, Candice LeRae aligned herself with Johnny Gargano and Tommaso Ciampa.

== Other media ==
She made her video game debut as a downloadable character in WWE 2K19 and returned for WWE 2K20, WWE 2K22, WWE 2K23, WWE 2K24, WWE 2K25 and WWE 2K26.

== Personal life ==
LeRae married fellow professional wrestler Johnny Gargano at Disneyland on September 16, 2016. They have been featured in a short-documentary on their dynamics as a wrestling couple. On August 12, 2021, the two announced that LeRae was pregnant with their first child. Their son was born on February 17, 2022.

LeRae is an avid fan of Disney movies, as well as NHL team the Anaheim Ducks. She has three brothers, one of whom was adopted by her parents when she was in high school.

== Championships and accomplishments ==
- Alternative Wrestling Show
  - AWS Women's World Championship (2 times)
  - AWS Women's Title Tournament
  - 2nd Annual Women's Tournament (2013)
  - 3rd Annual Women's Tournament (2013)
- DDT Pro-Wrestling
  - Ironman Heavymetalweight Championship (1 time)
- Dreamwave Wrestling
  - Dreamwave Tag Team Championship (1 time)
- Family Wrestling Entertainment
  - FWE Women's Championship (1 time)
- Fighting Spirit Pro Wrestling
  - FSP Tag Team Championship (1 time)
- Pro Wrestling Guerrilla
  - PWG World Tag Team Championship (1 time) – with Joey Ryan
- Pro Wrestling Illustrated
  - Ranked No. 18 of the top 50 female wrestlers in the PWI Female 50 in 2016
- Smash Wrestling
  - Gold Tournament (2015)
- WWE
  - NXT Women's Tag Team Championship (1 time) – with Indi Hartwell
  - WWE Women's Speed Championship (1 time, inaugural)
  - WWE Women's Speed Championship Tournament (2024)
