= La Liga Wrestling =

Wrestling promotion company based in Puerto Rico

- Company type: Private, Limited liability company
- Industry: Professional wrestling, sports entertainment
- Founded: December 19, 2012
- Founder: Richard Negrín
- Defunct: 2022
- Headquarters: San Juan, Puerto Rico
- Area served: Puerto Rico
- Key people: Boris Bilbraut (President); Miguel Rodríguez (Vice President); Tommy Diablo (Booker)

La Liga Wrestling (formerly World Wrestling League or Liga Mundial de Lucha) was a wrestling promotion company based out of San Juan, Puerto Rico. Founded in 2012 by businessman Richard Negrín with the cooperation of established wrestling figures such as Hugo Savinovich, the company developed a global scope, establishing alliances with over a dozen international promotions and holding shows throughout the Americas. In line with the traditional model of professional wrestling, LLW's shows do not feature legitimate sporting contests. Instead, its programs feature storyline-driven combat sport matches with predetermined outcomes and acrobatic and grappling maneuvers that are worked, which are publicly promoted as legitimate bouts to accentuate the entertainment.

Under its first administration the promotion featured a similar business model to other companies targeting a global audience, including a system of income that relies on licensed merchandise and an intricate developmental system employed to nurture its main roster. However, unlike the brand and contract based approach of promotions like World Wrestling Entertainment, WWL focused on the organization of cooperative events, allowing the free flow of its talents to associated companies in a system that served as a Latin American counterpart to the North American National Wrestling Alliance. After being acquired by Savio Vega in July 2016, the promotion shifted its focus to developing novel wrestlers, an approach that was continued by subsequent administrations. In January 2020, the format was changed with a rebrand, the introduction of an episodic format and the acquisition of an arena. The company also returned to its original target of promoting abroad, this time using FITE TV as a platform to reach other Hispanic markets.

== History ==
=== Negrín administration ===
Presided by Richard Negrin, produced by Hugo Savinovich and Danny Nieves Gerena as their Director of talents relations the World Wrestling League was founded in late 2012 and began its media exposition, with Josian Omed Vázquez Díaz as promotion's press manager, on January 21, 2013. The promotion was officially launched in a press conference held at the Water Club hotel in San Juan. In this event, WWL announced the signing of several high-profile Puerto Rican wrestlers, including former champions of the International Wrestling Association and World Wrestling Council Eric Pérez, Roberto Rubio and José "Monster Pain" Torres. The company also presented its business plan, noting that it intended to have an international scope instead of directly competing with other promotions in Puerto Rico. A series of alliances were made with several international promotions including Wrestling Alliance Revolution (WAR) in Ecuador, Leader Wrestling Assotiation (LWE) in Peru, Dominican Wrestling Entertainment (DWE) in the Dominican Republic and Total Nonstop Action Wrestling in the United States. During the following months, the promotion focused on creating its final roster and production team, which saw the exclusion of Víctor Siebens, owner of the Puerto Rico Wrestling Association, who had served as producer during the first months and the inclusion of Danny Nieves Gerena who was the promoter of NWA Chicago to fill the role. In February, two of the IWA's and WWC's main producers in the past, Héctor Moyano, Sr. and his eponymous son joined to work on the production of the television show, "Campeones del Ring", which was launched on Tele Isla and CW Puerto Rico the following week. Axel Cruz was contracted to serve as the promotions main announcer along Moyano, with Joe Don Smith and Harold Santy serving as counterparts for the English announce table. However, the announcing staff was changed due to the death of Moyano due to illness, with José Laureano joining it before his demise. In mid-February the WWL announced the inclusion of then NWA World Champion Kahagas and WXW World Champion Joe "Hercules" Gómez to the roster of its first show. This was followed by alliances with Lucha Libre AAA World Wide (AAA) in Mexico and Pro Wrestling Revolution (PWR) in California, with both of these companies agreeing for their champions to expose the titles outside of their territories. On February 16, the José Miguel Agrelot Coliseum was selected to host WWL's first show, "Idols of Wrestling".

The stage used by WWL was based on Castillo San Felipe del Morro.

Afterwards, an alliance with Lucha Xtrema Nacional of Panama was established, leading to the inclusion of its champion, Panama Jack Daniels #10, who was quickly teamed with WAR World Champion Mega Star in a team known as Los Mega 10. On February 25, 2013, Ricky Banderas was announced as the challenger for the AAA Mega Championship against El Texano, Jr. in what would be the main event of the debut show. A defense of the NWA World Championship was negotiated, but was abandoned once Kahagas dropped the title. However, PWR confirmed that both its Heavyweight and Women's championships would be exposed at Idols of Wrestling. Dominican Wrestling Entertainment did the same, with the addition of DWE Heavyweight Champion Rico Casanova to the event. In the weeks leading to Idols of Wrestling, AAA vice-president Dorian Roldán confirmed his presence for the card. On March 13, 2013, TNA talent was included in the card, an occurrence that was highlighted on Impact Wrestling's Spanish broadcast. WWL went on to announce the production of an iPPV for the international public. Pro Wrestling Zero1 became the first Japanese promotion to enter an alliance with WWL, directly working with them through Pro Wrestling Mexico Zero1 and leading to the addition of its title holder Psicodelico, Junior.

In the final month before the event, WWL joined Gladiadores Aztecas de Lucha Libre Internacional (GALLI) and presented its World Heavyweight and Tag Team title belts. On April 9, 2013, another foreign title defense was added, with Mid West USA champion Ricky Cruzz. Idols of Wrestling went ahead without chances in the announced card, featuring six title defenses. During the course of the event, new PWR champions were crowned in the figures of Ivelisse Vélez and Blue Demon, Jr., while Monster Pain won a tournament to crown the first WWL World Heavyweight Champion by defeating Bobby Lashley in the final draw. Immediately following its first show, WWL began to work on merchandising its brand, producing its first DVD and placing licensed apparel on the market. On April 26, 2013, the promotion released its rankings for the heavyweight, cruiserweight, tag team and women's divisions. The event gathered attention from mainstream media outlets, including Primera Hora, Univision Puerto Rico, America TeVé and Telemundo's Punto2 as well as specialized publications such as Súper Luchas. On April 30, 2013, the promotion announced an extension of Campeones del Ring to Panamian television. WWL's next appearance was at PWR's anniversary show, where members of its roster headed by Vélez performed.

=== International tours ===
During early May 2013, WWL negotiated with AAA in order to include some of its talents in Triplemanía XXI. In exchange, AAA talents joined for futures events, including some maineventerss such as Dr. Wagner, Jr. This led to the inclusion of the WWL Heavyweight Champion Monster Pain on that card, as well as the team of Pérez and Rubio in a contest for the AAA World Tag Team Championship. Pain joined Jeff Jarrett and Matt Morgan to defeat the AAA World Trios Champions, Los Psycho Circus. On May 13, 2013, WWL launched its first international tour, establishing dates for Monterrey (Mexico), San Antonio, California, Eagle Pass, Chicago, Pennsylvania, New York, the Dominican Republic and its second show in Puerto Rico. As part of this effort, an alliance was created with Fighting Spirit Wrestling (FSW) and international wrestlers including John Henningan, Mil Máscaras and Terry Funk were signed. On May 17, 2013, WWL announced that they had signed Carly Colón for their shows. This was regarded as an unexpected event, due to the fact that Colón is a main eventer in the World Wrestling Council, and that promotion's press manager, José Roberto Rodríguez, had used its official webpage to directly criticize WWL. The first talents to be contracted in June were Heddi Karaoui of All Star Wrestling U.K. and Zumbi of the Brazilian Wrestling Federation.

On July 7, 2013, the promotion crowned their first World Tag Team Champions, when Los Mamitos (Mr. E & Sexy B) defeated the teams of Eita & Tomahawk, El Hijo de Kato Kung Lee & Vengador Radioactivo, and Heddi Karaoui & Zumbi in a four-way match. On July 28, 2013, WWL reached an association agreement with the National Wrestling Alliance. Three days later, the promotion closed a deal with New Xtreme Order of Bolivia. In September WWL held two shows in Mexico, which were highlighted by several local wrestlers gaining victories over foreign champions. Among these were Los Mamitos who defeated the AAA World Tag Team Champions "The Mexican Powers" (Joe Líder and Crazy Boy) and Los Boricuas who reunited to score a win over the Los Psycho Circus, the team that still held the AAA World Trios Championship. Colón debuted by winning a three-way match over AAA Latin American Champion Blue Demon, Jr. and La Parka II. In the final title match of the 2013 season, Pain successfully defended the WWL World Heavyweight Championship against John Morrison. During the offseason, an alliance with Desastre Total Ultraviolento (DTU) and the incorporation of masked female wrestler Zeuxis were made official. On January 4, 2014, the promotion announced the second season of the Dream Matches Tour, which opens with three shows between March 7– 9. WWL made further moves to promote these events, also exploiting the publicity generated by Luis Urive's release from WWE by immediately recruiting the original Sin Cara.

=== Presidential instability and hiatuses ===
This stage opened with a series headlined by a successful defense of Los Mamitos over La Dinastía Máscaras (Sicodelico, Jr. and El Hijo de Dos Caras). Monster Pain won a triple threat match and wrestled Mil Máscaras to a no contest to remain the WWL World Wrestling Champion. On June 15, 2014, WWL announced a restructuration of its programming, introducing two new shows that debuted in the Puerto Rico subsidiary of The CW, "Hablando de Lucha" and "WWL Presenta" airing Saturdays and Sundays respectively.

On January 6, 2015 Director of Talent Relations Danny Nieves Gerena resigned from the company. Two months later, on March 23, 2015, WWL founder and president Richard Negín announced his retirement from wrestling, closing the WWL.

However, on April 11, 2015 WWL founder and president Richard Negrin announced that WWL once again is open for business and will debut on new network Mega TV (United States) Puerto Rico subsidiary WVOZ-TV Channel 32.1 with a new show named "High Voltage" debut on March 25, 2015 and creating The Saturday War competing that day's schedule 12:00 - 1:00pm with WWC the Extreme Wrestling Organization (EWO). On June 22, 2015 WWL President Richard Negrin announced that World Wrestling League would start their TV Tapings at Teatro Ambassador in Santurce, Puerto Rico and also he was going to reveal their "Biggest Signing of Wrestling" and later was revealed that the sign was Invader #1. On October 28, 2015, Negrín announced that the promotion would cease holding cards, citing that a diabetes condition was preventing him from running the organization.

=== Rivera brothers–Bilbraut administration, The CRASH ===
Months later, WWL began airing a number of skits in its social media pages, eventually leading to a formal announcement that it would resume operations on March 13, 2016. A new element introduced was a new World Heavyweight Championship belt, which was forged but never debuted during 2015. Some days later, they announced their new Television Home was going to be "America Tevé" with their program "High Voltage" to debut on April 4, 2016. Then held the first TV Taping of the third season at Maxx FC Gym in Bayamon on April 30, 2016, the second and third TV Tapings at The Outlet in Canovanas on June 18, 2016 and July 16, 2016. The first Live event of 2016 in this new season was "Summer Blast" which took place on August 13, 2016 in Arecibo. The second live event Started a series of live events called "WWL High Voltage Live" and it took place on September 17, 2016 at "WWL Arena" in Carolina, Puerto Rico.

On September 26, 2016, it was announced by General Manager Dennis Rivera that WWL stopped their TV Broadcast on America TV and now they are focused on Social Media. The third season of "High Voltage" ended on October 23, 2016 with 28 Episodes meanwhile fourth season started on November 4, 2016 and the first live event was Implosion that took place on November 5, 2016 on Cataño, Puerto Rico, the second live event was WWL High Voltage Live on November 13, 2016 again on Cataño. On March 16, it was announced that WWL returned to TV now on the TV Channel Punto 2 starting on April 2, 2017.

Following the passing of Hurricane Irma (WWL Had to cancel its live event on September 9, 2017) and Hurricane Maria over Puerto Rico, the promotion entered a forced hiatus until at least February/March 2018. Due to this, licenses were issued to talents so that they could remain active in the local independent and international circuits. WWL would return to action with "Juicio Final" on April 20, 2018 in Dorado.

=== WWL vs. IWA ===
Juicio Final was the first event held by the promotion in 2018, culminating with an angle where Savio Vega returned to an active role and threatened to change WWL's name and relaunch the IWA trademark. Negrín responded to the storyline by appearing in a segment for the Champion Wrestling Association (CWA) in which he burned one of the original WWL World Heavyweight Championship belts and merchandise. Following weeks of promotion that included the reintroduction of several IWA titles (the Undisputed World, Tag Team and Intercontinental championships), as well as interviews with several of its former wrestlers, a match for control of the promotion was scheduled for Golpe de Estado 2018. The storyline ran for four months, facilitating the way for IWA to be formally relaunched in Florida in a move that led to Vega exiting WWL. Boris Bilbraut still is the president of the company, leaving Rondón in charge of a new administration as on air character.

=== Liga Mundial de Lucha on Fite.TV ===
Around Middle 2019, WWL started branding itself "Liga Mundial de Lucha" then On June 1, 2019 it was announced on a press conference that La Liga Mundial Live events, TV Program and Pay Per Views were going to be part of Fite.TV Service, with "Pena Capital" being the first pay per view event available for the platform. The second PPV available for the platform was "Insurrection", the event name returned after being held previously in 2014.

=== Rebrand to LLW, pandemic interlude, second hiatus, and eventual closure (2019–2022) ===
After last event of 2019 "Black Xmas" was cancelled for undisclosed reasons, WWL started doing "El Fin" posts on Facebook that ended on January 14 with a video unveiling the concept of La Liga Wrestling. This marked a rebrand for WWL, which changed its name and business model, adopting a static home base known as the Liga Wrestling Arena in San Juan where tapings took place. With the onset of the COVID-19 pandemic the promotion entered into an extended hiatus that lasted until 2021, remaining mostly inactive from all platforms during this timeframe. The only communication that LLW issued during this time was a tease that a return was imminent in June 2020, when the government of Puerto Rico was considering more flexible safety measures that would allow contact sports to hold events with limited attendance. However, as more outbreaks took place this development was prevented. As today after the company enter in a hiatus and all talent including current champions, are working in differents companies in the island and outside, aside others companies began to use the Venue of La Liga Wrestling Arena for their tv tapings and live streaming show, Without any comment from management or executives, or any communication, and 2 years of inactivity, the company closed without any official announcement. The facebook page is still open sharing posts from his former talents.

== Developmental territories ==
On March 30, 2013, WWL confirmed that it would open a developmental territory, New Borinquen Pro Wrestling, which had been originally envisioned by Danny Nieves-Gerena a year before as a strong-style promotion based on the Japanese tradition. On April 28. 2013, WWL presented NBPW's redesigned logo and improved graphics. On May 21, 2013, NBPW announced the date of its debut show setting it for June 29. The territory began its own series of signings from the Puerto Rican independent circuit, including talent with experience in the original International Wrestling Association via open tryouts. A developmental expansion followed, when WWL's alliance with GALLI evolved so that the former could become a territory based on a city with heavy Puerto Rican population. Locally, independent promotion New Revolution Wrestling briefly became a territory operating in Puerto Rico's west coast. After Nieves-Gerena resigned in 2015, NBPW broke ties with the WWL.

On August 20, 2018, WWL announced that Nieves-Gerena had returned to the company in an advertising role. On February 19, 2019, the NBPW Heavyweight Championship was introduced. In the process, Nieves-Gerena noted that WWL would sanction the project once again.

== Working relationships ==
=== Associates ===
- (Puerto Rico) Champion Wrestling Association

=== Former associates ===
- (Mexico) The Crash Lucha Libre
- (United States) Total Nonstop Action Wrestling
- (Brazil) Brazilian Wrestling Federation
- (Ecuador) Wrestling Alliance Revolution
- (Japan) Pro Wrestling Zero1
- (Mexico) Consejo Mundial de Lucha Libre
- (Mexico) LLaves y Candados
- (Mexico) Desastre Total Ultraviolento
- (Panama) Lucha Xtrema Nacional
- (Peru) Leader Wrestling Assotiation
- (United States) Fighting Spirit Wrestling
- (United States) Gladiadores Aztecas de Lucha Libre Internacional
- (United States) Pro Wrestling Revolution
- Pro Wrestling Zero1 Mexico
- (United States) National Wrestling Alliance
- (Bolivia) New Xtreme Order
- (Chile) Xplosion Nacional de Lucha
- (Chile) Accion Sin Limites
- (Mexico) Lucha Libre AAA World Wide
- (Puerto Rico) World Wrestling Council
- (Dominican Republic) Dominican Wrestling Entertainment

=== Deveploment territory ===
- (Puerto Rico) New Borinquen Pro Wrestling (NBPW)
- (Puerto Rico) Entertainment Wrestling Organization (EWO)

== Broadcasting History ==
Since its beginning, WWL has produced numerous TV programs including:

Program Name	Channel	Date
Campeones del Ring	(Puerto Rico) Tele Isla	February 9, 2013 - June 2013
Idols of Wrestling	CW Puerto Rico	July 13, 2014 - March 22, 2015
Idols of Wrestling	(Dominican Republic) Super Canal 33	July 2014 - Late 2014
WWL Presenta	CW Puerto Rico	July 12, 2014 - 2015
WWL Presenta	(Dominican Republic) Teleuniverso	October 10, 2015 - October 31, 2015
WWL High Voltage	(Puerto Rico) Punto 2	April 25, 2015 - October 2, 2015 (Mega TV); April 4, 2016 - September 26, 2016 (América TV); January 26, 2019 - Present (Punto 2)
Aftershock	(Puerto Rico) Canal 85	February 8, 2019 - Present (Facebook) June 28, 2019 - Present (Canal 85 Liberty)

== Main Wrestling Events ==
Each year WWL promotes a number of signature events, following a Schedule for their Main Program "High Voltage", The annual shows, shown in order of occurrence during each year, include:

Event	Date	Place	Notes
Summer Blast	August 16, 2016	Arecibo, Puerto Rico	First live event of 2016 and "High Voltage" Season 3
High Voltage Live!	September 17, 2016	Carolina, Puerto Rico	First live event to be made on a "WWL Arena" branded building
Implosion	November 5, 2016	Cataño, Puerto Rico	First live event of "High Voltage" Season 4
High Voltage Live!	November 13, 2016	Cataño, Puerto Rico	Second live event done on Cataño
High Voltage Live!	December 11, 2016	Arecibo, Puerto Rico	Second live event to be done on Arecibo
WWL Christmas in PR	December 17, 2016	Bayamon, Puerto Rico	Final event of 2016 during "High Voltage" Season 4
High Voltage Live! Evolucion	January 14, 2017	Cataño, Puerto Rico	First live event of 2017
High Voltage Live!	January 28, 2017	Cataño, Puerto Rico	Second live event of 2017
Genesis	March 25, 2017	Guaynabo, Puerto Rico	Free Live Event, made after WWL reorganization
High Voltage Live!	Abril 22, 2017	Aguada, Puerto Rico	First Live event On Puerto Rico West Zone
Golpe de Estado	Mayo 13, 2017	Juncos, Puerto Rico	Big event that brought foreign and new wrestlers to the promotion.
High Voltage Live!	June 3, 2017	San Juan, Puerto Rico	WWL's Return to San Juan
High Voltage Live!	June 24, 2017	Juncos, Puerto Rico	Second WWL TV Taping done at Juncos.
War in the West!	July 15, 2017	Mayaguez, Puerto Rico	First live event on the city.
High Voltage Live!	August 5, 2017	Juncos, Puerto Rico	Third WWL TV Taping at Juncos.
Juicio Final	April 20, 2018	Dorado, Puerto Rico	Return of WWL after Huracan Maria Passing
Golpe de Estado	May 26, 2018	Guaynabo, Puerto Rico	Second Golpe de Estado live event
Summer Blast	June 24, 2018	Vega Baja, Puerto Rico	Second Summer Blast live event
War in the West! 2	July 7, 2018	Mayaguez, Puerto Rico	Second War in the West live event
High Voltage Live!	July 28, 2018	Dorado, Puerto Rico	Second WWL live event in Dorado
High Voltage Live!	August 18, 2018	Dorado, Puerto Rico	The event had a Tag Team Tables, Ladders & Chairs match
High Voltage Live!	September 1, 2018	Guaynabo, Puerto Rico	
WWL Destino Final	September 30, 2018	Dorado, Puerto Rico	
High Voltage Live!	October 27, 2018	Villalba, Puerto Rico	First live event on the city.
Black Xmas	December 15, 2018	Dorado, Puerto Rico	Last live event of the year
Genesis, Un Nuevo Comienzo	January 19, 2019	Dorado, Puerto Rico	A new beginning for WWL
High Voltage Live!: Juegos Mentales	February 9, 2019	Dorado, Puerto Rico	First live event shown on Punto 2 TV Return
Todo o Nada	March 15, 2019	Dorado, Puerto Rico	LAX Return to WWL
Fuera de Control	April 14, 2019	Toa Baja, Puerto Rico	WWL Return to Toa Baja
Apuesta Letal	May 17, 2019	Dorado, Puerto Rico	
Destino Final	June 15, 2019	Dorado, Puerto Rico	Last Dorado stop before heading West PR
War in the West III La Gran Guerra	July 21, 2019	Mayaguez, Puerto Rico	Official Sponsor was "Aguada Con 2019" Comic Fest
Pena Capital	August 10, 2019	San Juan, Puerto Rico	First PPV announced for Fite.TV
High Voltage Live!	August 24, 2019	Toa Baja, Puerto Rico	Road to Resistencia
Resistencia	September 14, 2019	Dorado, Puerto Rico	30 Minutes Iron Match was held at the show
Insurrection	October 12, 2019	Caguas, Puerto Rico	Second PPV announced for Fite.TV
Guerra de Poder	November 15, 2019	Dorado, Puerto Rico	
WWL El Fin	February 9, 2020	San Juan, Puerto Rico	Last event promoted as WWL and beginning of "Liga Wrestling"

=== Past Events Include ===
Idols of Wrestling (04/21/2013 San Juan), Dream Matches Mexico Tour (Late 2013/2014), Insurrection (10/18/2014 Bayamon), Navidad Corporativa (12/13/2014 Bayamon), Guerra de Reyes (01/06/2015 San Juan), Rebelión en el Sur (02/21/2015 Ponce), International Cup (03/21/2015 Bayamon), Sin Piedad (08/15/2015 Toa Baja), WrestleFest (09/19/2015 Bayamon).

== Championships and accomplishments ==
=== Final Champions ===
Mr. Big as the WWL World Heavyweight Champion.

Championship	Final champion(s)	Date won	Event
WWL World Heavyweight Championship	Star Roger	February 9, 2020	The End
WWL Americas Championship	Mark Davidson	January 20, 2020	Pena Capital
WWL World Tag Team Championship	Los Primos Melendez	February 9, 2020	The End
WWL Super Cruiserweight Championship	"El Atleta" Manu	August 10, 2019	Pena Capital

=== Other accomplishments ===
Accomplishment	Latest winner	Date won
Rising Stars Battle Royal	Prince Xander	October 18, 2014
WWL International Cup	Escobar	March 21, 2015
Lethal Battle	Justin Dynamite	May 17, 2019
Super Cruiserweight Cup	"El Atleta" Manu	August 10, 2019

=== Defunct and inactive championships ===
Championship	Status	Date last contested
WWL Television Championship	Inactive	August 4, 2016
WWL World Trios Championship	Inactive	September 30, 2018
WWL Extreme Championship	Abandoned	October 28, 2015
WWL Goddess Championship	Abandoned	August 13, 2016

== Hall of Immortals ==
The Salón de los Inmortales (Spanish for Hall of Immortals) is the WWL Hall of Fame. It was created in 2015.

Year	Image	Ring name (Birth name)	Accolades
2015		Invader #1 (José Huertas González)	WWL's former Corporative Director. Won over 30 championships between Puerto Rico and United States.
2015		Invader #3 (Johnny Rivera)	Won many regional tag team and junior weight titles. Went to become a wrestling trainer.
2015		El Profe (Ángel Pantoja)	Long time wrestler, manager and commentator.
2015		Super Médico #1 (José Estrada Sr.)	Won over 20 championships between Puerto Rico and United States.
2015		Rickin Sánchez	In the 80s Rickin Sanchez was a standout had taken over as Capitol's main promoter, as well as becoming one of the organization's broadcasters on the television shows.
2019		Jose Luis Rivera (Marcelino Rivera Alicea)	He was part of "Los Conquistadores" Tag team in WWF
2019		El Vikingo (Salvador Pérez)	A native from El Salvador wrestled and managed in Puerto Rico for many years. Later became a referee.
2019		Barrabas (Felix López Torres)	Former wrestler in the 60's, 70's, and 80's. Most famous for been a notorious heel manager.

== See also ==
- Professional wrestling in Puerto Rico
- List of professional wrestling promotions
