= WWL Super Cruiserweight Championship =

Puerto Rican professional wrestling championship

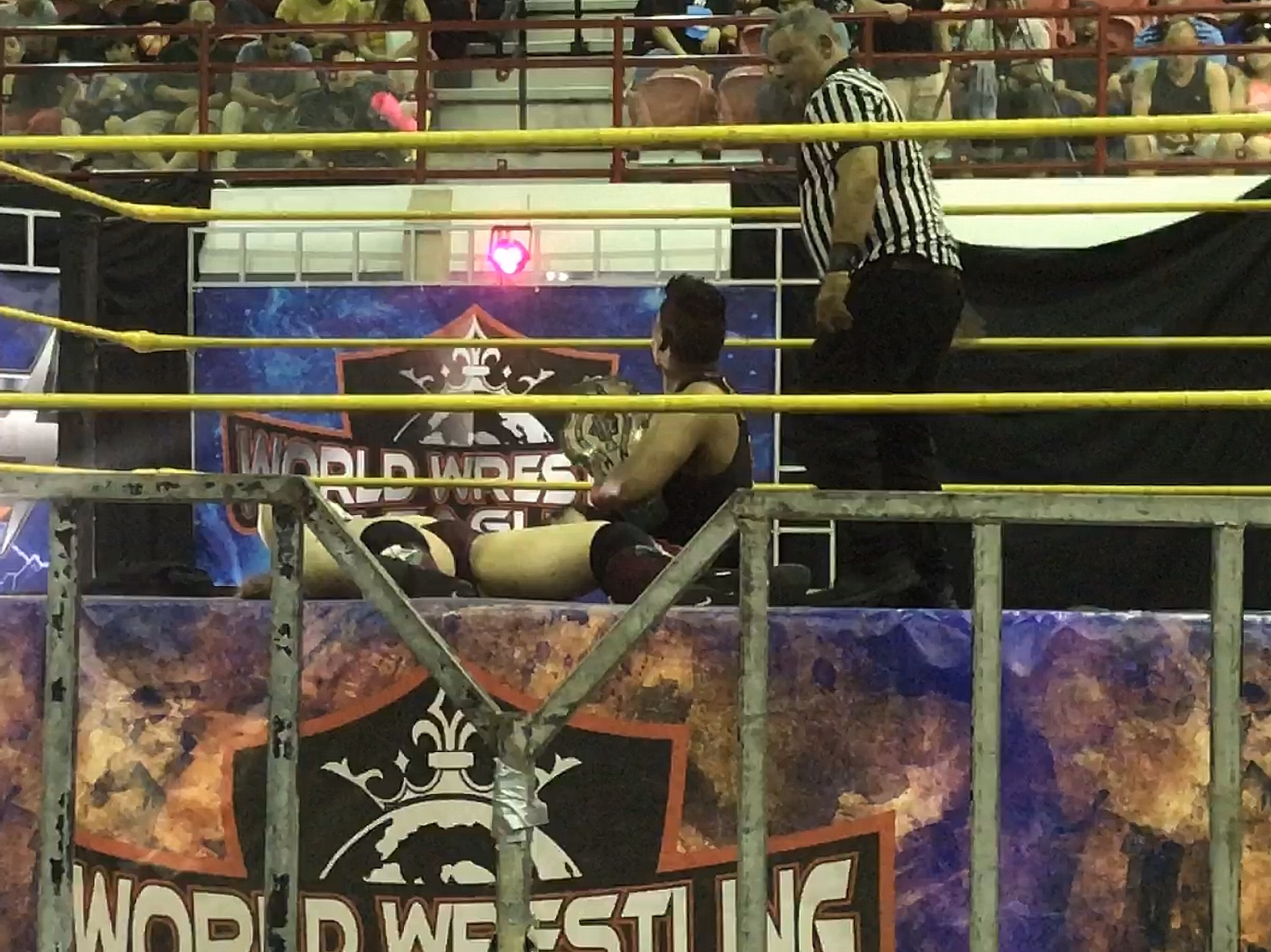
- Dimes during his incumbency.

Details
- Promotion: World Wrestling League
- Date established: July 16, 2015
- Current champion(s): Vacant
- Date won: July 2, 2020
Statistics
- First champion(s): Dimes
- Most reigns: Dimes (2 reigns)
- Longest reign: Manu (327 days)

The WWL Super Cruiserweight Championship or in Spanish Campeonato Super Crucero De La WWL is a professional wrestling championship promoted by the World Wrestling League (WWL) promotion in Puerto Rico.

The championship is generally contested in professional wrestling matches, in which participants execute scripted finishes rather than contend in direct competition.

== Title history ==
After Mark Davidson vacated the title, it was announced on a press conference that a "Copa Super Crucero" tournament would start on "Destino Final" and it would end on "Pena Capital" the first PPV announced for Fite.TV and the winner of this tournament would be the new champion

Destino Final * / War in the West III **
*	El Atleta Manu	W
Androide 787
*	Kevin Norban	W
Autentico Joe
*	Rodrigo Garcia	W
Fast Forward
**	OB
Mr. Cage
**	El Gentil
King Kandelo
**	Andrew Koztaz
Brandom Mullen

War in the West III: La Gran Guerra
El Atleta Manu
Kevin Norban
Rodrigo Garcia

Pena Capital

Pena Capital

#	Wrestlers	Reign	Date	Days held	Location	Event	Notes	Ref
1	Dimes	1	September 19, 2015	273	Bayamón, Puerto Rico	Wrestlefest	Defeated 10 wrestlers in an Elimination Tornado Match. It aired on tape delay on April 11, 2016.	
2	Niche	1	June 18, 2016	176	Canóvanas, Puerto Rico	WWL High Voltage #14 - Third Season	This episode aired on tape delay on July 4, 2016.	
3	Quinto Elemento	1	December 11, 2016	101	Arecibo, Puerto Rico	WWL High Voltage Live!		
-	Vacated	-	March 22, 2017	-	-	-	Announced on Facebook Live that he left the promotion.	
4	Dimes	2	March 25, 2017	91	Bayamón, Puerto Rico	WWL Génesis	Defeated Aiden Grimm for the vacant title.	
5	Payatronic	1	June 24, 2017	300	Juncos, Puerto Rico	WWL High Voltage Live!		
6	Pupe Jackson	1	April 20, 2018	99	Dorado, Puerto Rico	WWL Juicio Final		
7	Mark Davidson	1	July 28, 2018	293	Dorado, Puerto Rico	WWL High Voltage Live!		
-	Vacated	-	May 17, 2019	-	-	-	Mark vacated the title after being offered a title shot for the WWL Americas Championship	
8	"El Atleta" Manu	1	August 10, 2019	327	San Juan, Puerto Rico	WWL Pena Capital	Won Copa Super Crucero and became champion defeating El Gentil	
-	Vacated	-	July 2, 2020	-	-	-	When WWL closes.	-
