= Family Wrestling Entertainment =

American independent professional wrestling promotion

- Acronym: FWE
- Founded: 2011
- Defunct: 2015
- Style: Professional wrestling Sports entertainment
- Headquarters: New York City, New York
- Founder: Jordan Schneider
- Owner: Jordan Schneider

Family Wrestling Entertainment, also known as FWE, was an independent professional wrestling promotion. The company was based and ran shows in New York. They hosted a show about every four months.

== History ==
Family Wrestling Entertainment (FWE) was founded by Jordan Schneider in 2011, with the concept of all family wrestling. On October 5, 2012, FWE held their first iPPV. In October 2013, FWE held the Openweight Prix Tournament, which was won by Tony Nese. However, the promotion entered into hiatus until 2014.

On February 7, 2015, FWE held the No Limits iPPV. It was on this card that the Insane Championship Wrestling Heavyweight Championship was renamed the ICW World Heavyweight Championship due to Drew Galloway successfully retaining against Matt Hardy, which was the first defence of this Scottish title in the USA.

On March 31, 2015, FWE announced the cancellation of their April events. The promotion has not held an event since March 11, 2015.

== Championships ==
=== Last champions ===
Championship	Last champion(s)	Date won	Won from
FWE Heavyweight Championship	AJ Styles	March 11, 2015	John Hennigan
FWE Tri-Borough Championship	Paul London	February 16, 2013	Damien Darling
FWE Women's Championship	Veda Scott	March 11, 2015	Candice LeRae
FWE Tag Team Championship	The Young Bucks	October 4, 2014	Tony Nese & Jigsaw

=== FWE Heavyweight Championship ===
FWE Heavyweight Championship

Details
- Promotion: Family Wrestling Entertainment
- Date established: August 20, 2011
- Date retired: March 31, 2015
Statistics
- First champion: Charlie Haas
- Final champion: A.J. Styles
- Longest reign: John Hennigan (628 days)
- Shortest reign: A.J. Styles (20 days)
- Oldest champion: Tommy Dreamer (41 years, 166 days)
- Youngest champion: Jay Lethal (26 years, 330 days)
- Heaviest champion: Tommy Dreamer (255 lb (116 kg))
- Lightest champion: Jay Lethal and John Hennigan (209 lb (95 kg))

The FWE Heavyweight Championship was a championship in FWE. The first holder of the title was Charlie Haas. There have been seven reigns, shared between seven different wrestlers.

Key
No.	Overall reign number
Reign	Reign number for the specific champion
Days	Number of days held

No.	Champion	Championship change			Reign statistics		Notes	Ref.
No.	Champion	Date	Event	Location	Reign	Days	Notes	Ref.
1	Charlie Haas	August 20, 2011	Empire State Showdown	New York City, New York	1	119	Haas defeated Eric Young and Jay Lethal in a no disqualification Three-way dance to become the inaugural champion.	
2	Eric Young	December 17, 2011	Haastility	New York City, New York	1	98		
3	Jay Lethal	March 24, 2012	Welcome to The Rumble	New York City, New York	1	126		
4	Tommy Dreamer	July 28, 2012	X	Carle Place, NY	1	70	This was a Four-way elimination match, also involving Brian Kendrick and Carlito Colón.	
5	Carlito Colón	October 6, 2012	House of Hardcore	Poughkeepsie, NY	1	258	This was a three-way match, also involving Mike Knox.	
6	John Hennigan	June 21, 2013	Welcome to the Rumble 2	Corona, NY	1	628		
7	A.J. Styles	March 11, 2015	FWE XIX: Hennigan Vs. Styles	New York City, New York	1	20	This was a two-out-of-three falls match.	
—	Deactivated	March 31, 2015	—	—	—	—	The championship was deactivated when FWE closed.	

=== FWE Tri-Borough Championship ===
FWE Tri-Borough Championship

Details
- Promotion: Family Wrestling Entertainment
- Date established: December 17, 2011
- Date retired: March 31, 2015
Statistics
- First champion: Damien Darling
- Most reigns: Damien Darling (2)
- Longest reign: Paul London (773 Days)
- Shortest reign: Jay Lethal (28 days)
- Oldest champion: Paul London (32 years, 306 days)

The FWE Tri-Borough Championship was a championship in FWE. The first holder of the title was Damien Darling. There have been four reigns, shared between three different wrestlers.

Key
No.	Overall reign number
Reign	Reign number for the specific champion
Days	Number of days held

No.	Champion	Championship change			Reign statistics		Notes	Ref.
No.	Champion	Date	Event	Location	Reign	Days	Notes	Ref.
1	Damien Darling	December 17, 2011	Haastility	New York City, New York	1	70	Darling defeated Johnny Knockout in a tournament final to become the inaugural champion.	
2	Jay Lethal	February 25, 2012	No Limits	New York City, New York	1	28		
3	Damien Darling	March 24, 2012	Welcome to the Rumble	New York City, New York	2	329		
4	Paul London	February 16, 2013	No Limits	New York City, New York	1	773		
—	Deactivated	March 31, 2015	—	—	—	—	The championship was deactivated when FWE closed.	

=== FWE Women's Championship ===
FWE Women's Championship

Details
- Promotion: Family Wrestling Entertainment
- Date established: February 25, 2012
- Date retired: 2015

Other name
- FWE Ladies Championship
Statistics
- First champion: Maria Kanellis
- Final champion: Veda Scott
- Most reigns: Maria Kanellis (2 times)
- Longest reign: Maria Kanellis (798 days)
- Shortest reign: Ivelisse Vélez (<1 day)
- Oldest champion: Maria Kanellis (27 years, 154 days)
- Youngest champion: Ivelisse Vélez (27 years, 13 days)
- Heaviest champion: Winter (140 lb (64 kg))
- Lightest champion: Candice LeRae (110 lb (50 kg))

The FWE Women's Championship was a women's professional wrestling championship in FWE. The first holder of the title was Maria Kanellis, who won a four-woman tournament on February 25, 2012. The last holder of the title was Veda Scott, who won on March 11, 2015.

Key
No.	Overall reign number
Reign	Reign number for the specific champion
Days	Number of days held

No.	Champion	Championship change			Reign statistics		Notes	Ref.
No.	Champion	Date	Event	Location	Reign	Days	Notes	Ref.
1	Maria Kanellis	February 25, 2012	No Limits	New York City, New York	1	28	Kanellis defeated Winter in a tournament final to become the inaugural champion.	
2	Winter	February 25, 2012	Welcome to the Rumble	New York City, New York	1	126	This was a three-way match, also involving Rosita.	
3	Maria Kanellis	July 28, 2012	X	Carle Place, NY	2	798		
4	Ivelisse Vélez	October 4, 2014	ReFuled - Night 2	New York City, New York	1	<1		
5	Candice LeRae	October 4, 2014	ReFuled – Night 2	New York City, New York	1	158	Immediately after Ivelisse Vélez won the championship from Maria Kanellis, LeRae challenged Vélez for the title.	
6	Veda Scott	March 11, 2015	FWE XIX: Hennigan Vs. Styles	New York City, New York	1	20	Scott teamed with Paul London and defeated the team of Candice LeRae and Joey Ryan to win the championship. This match was also for London's FWE Tri-Borough Championship.	
—	Deactivated	March 31, 2015	—	—	—	—	The championship was deactivated when FWE closed.	

=== FWE Tag Team Championship ===
FWE Tag Team Championship

Details
- Promotion: Family Wrestling Entertainment
- Date established: October 5, 2012
- Date retired: March 31, 2015
Statistics
- First champions: The Adrenaline Expres (EJ Risk and VSK)
- Longest reign: The Adrenaline Expres (EJ Risk and VSK) (728 days)
- Shortest reign: Jigsaw and Tony Nese (1 day)

The FWE Tag Team Championship was a championship in FWE. The first holders of the title were Adrenaline Express (EJ Risk and VSK).

Key
No.	Overall reign number
Reign	Reign number for the specific champion
Days	Number of days held

No.	Champion	Championship change			Reign statistics		Notes	Ref.
No.	Champion	Date	Event	Location	Reign	Days	Notes	Ref.
1	The Adrenaline Express (EJ Risk and VSK)	October 5, 2012	Back 2 Brooklyn	Brooklyn, NY	1	728	The Adrenaline Express defeated Daivari and Sonjay Dutt in a tournament final to become the inaugural champions.	
2	Jigsaw and Tony Nese	October 3, 2014	ReFuled – Night 1	Brooklyn, NY	1	1		
3	The Young Bucks (Matt Jackson and Nick Jackson)	October 4, 2014	ReFuled – Night 2	New York City, New York	1	178	This was a four-way TLC match, also involving The Adrenaline Express (EJ Risk and VSK) and The Addiction (Christopher Daniels and Frankie Kazarian).	
—	Deactivated	March 31, 2015	—	—	—	—	The championship was deactivated when FWE closed.	
