= WWL Goddess Championship =

Professional wrestling women's championship

Details
- Promotion: World Wrestling League
- Date established: March 18, 2015
Statistics
- First champion: La Morena
- Most reigns: All champions (1 reign)
- Longest reign: Ivellisse (364 days)
- Shortest reign: La Morena (120 days)
- Oldest champion: La Morena (30-31 years)
- Youngest champion: Ivelisse (27 years)
- Heaviest champion: La Morena (150 lbs (68 kg))
- Lightest champion: Ivelisse (115 lb (52 kg))

The WWL Goddess Championship is a women's professional wrestling championship promoted by the World Wrestling League (WWL) promotion in Puerto Rico, basically is the women's championship of World Wrestling League.

The championship is generally contested in professional wrestling matches, in which participants execute scripted finishes rather than contend in direct competition.

== Title history ==
#	Wrestlers	Reign	Date	Days held	Location	Event	Notes	Ref
1	La Morena	1	March 21, 2015	120	Bayamon, Puerto Rico	International Cup	Defeated Genesis to be the inaugural champion.	
—	Vacated	—	July 19, 2015	—	—	—	Vacated due to null communication between La Morena and WWL.	
2	Ivelisse	1	August 15, 2015	364	Toa Baja, Puerto Rico	Sin Piedad	Defeated Barbie Boy to win the vacated title. It aired on Tape delay on August 22, 2015	
—	Vacated	—	August 13, 2016	—	Arecibo, Puerto Rico	Summer Blast	Declared vacant by GM Dennis Rivera. It aired on tape delay on August 18, 2016	
