= Ivelisse Vélez =

Puerto Rican professional wrestler (born 1988)

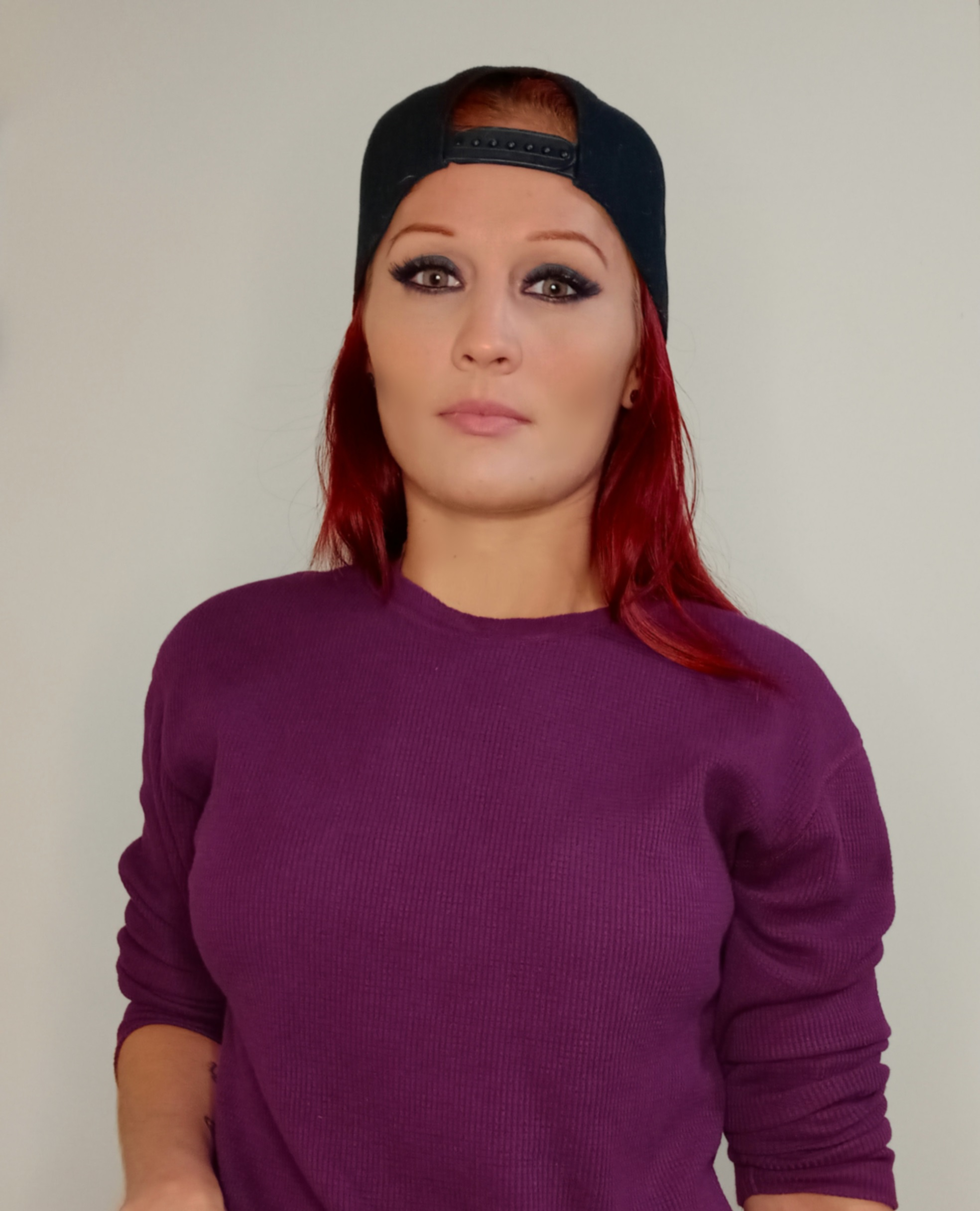

Personal information
- Born: Ivelisse Milagro Vélez; September 21, 1988 (age 38) Ponce, Puerto Rico

Professional wrestling career
- Ring name(s): Ivelisse; Ivelisse Vélez; La Sicaria; Juliette; Sexy Juliette; Sofia Cortez
- Billed height: 5 ft 4 in (1.63 m)
- Billed weight: 120 lb (54 kg)
- Billed from: Chicago, Illinois; Puerto Rico; San Juan, Puerto Rico
- Trained by: Carlos Colón Sr. Quique Cruz; Savio Vega; Steve "Boz" Boniak
- Debut: 2004

Ivelisse Milagro Vélez (born September 21, 1988), better known by her mononymous ring name Ivelisse, is a Puerto Rican professional wrestler. She performs on the independent circuit – predominantly for Shine Wrestling. She is best known for her time in Lucha Underground and All Elite Wrestling (AEW).

In 2011, Vélez appeared in one season of WWE Tough Enough competitive reality show, and WWE signed her to a developmental wrestling contract later the same year. In 2011 and 2012, Vélez worked under the WWE ring name Sofia Cortez in the developmental territory Florida Championship Wrestling (renamed NXT in 2012). She quickly formed an alliance with Saraya Bevis (Paige) and established the "Anti-Diva"" Stable, which Shaul Guerrero (Raquel Diaz) later joined.

== Professional wrestling career ==
=== Early career ===
Vélez began training to be a wrestler at age fifteen in Puerto Rico, debuting in the World Wrestling Council, and later wrestling for the International Wrestling Association (IWA). After gaining experience, Vélez began wrestling on the U.S. mainland, beginning on the Chicago independent circuit, continuing her training under Chicago Style Wrestling's Steve "Boz" Bozniak.

=== WWE ===
==== Tough Enough (2011) ====
In March 2011, Vélez was announced as one of 14 contestants for the fifth season of WWE Tough Enough. On the May 10 episode, she was eliminated due to a leg injury. However, WWE signed Vélez to a developmental contract that November 11.

==== Florida Championship Wrestling (2011–2012) ====
WWE assigned Vélez to its then-developmental territory, Florida Championship Wrestling (FCW), where she debuted (under the ring name Sofia Cortez) at an FCW house show in a six-woman tag team match (teaming with Cameron Lynn and Audrey Marie to defeat Caylee Turner, Leah West and Raquel Diaz). Vélez made her TV debut on the December 25, 2011, episode of FCW TV, teaming with Turner to defeat Cameron Lynn and Kaitlyn. On the March 11 episode of FCW TV, Cortez formed a villainous stable dubbed The Anti-Divas, consisting of herself, Paige and Raquel Diaz, with the trio attacking Audrey Marie. The following week on FCW TV, Cortez and Paige and lost to Marie and Kaitlyn.

==== NXT (2012) ====
WWE rebranded FCW "NXT" (emphasizing its wrestlers as the next generation of eventual WWE Superstars). Cortez's NXT TV debut was on the July 4 episode of NXT, taped at Full Sail University in Orlando, Florida, where she defeated Paige. On the July 25 episode of NXT, Cortez defeated WWE main roster wrestler Natalya by count-out, but suffered a post-match attack from Natalya. In August 2012, Vélez announced WWE had released her from her contract, ending her WWE employment. Her final match (taped before her release occurred) saw her lose to Tamina Snuka.

During a May 2015 podcast with Vince Russo, Vélez alluded to her reporting the misconduct of WWE Performance Center head trainer Bill DeMott to WWE management as the likely reason she was fired, and said she was one of the first to report DeMott's misconduct. DeMott abruptly left WWE in March 2015 amid mounting public pressure on WWE after a wave of published news reports detailing similar accusations of grossly unprofessional misconduct by DeMott being made by over 12 former WWE trainees/wrestlers.

=== Independent circuit (2012–present) ===
On October 4, 2012, Vélez debuted at Family Wrestling Entertainment (FWE)'s Back 2 Brooklyn pay-per-view as a special guest, along with former WWE Diva Maryse Ouellet. Vélez established herself as a heel by delivering a promo about her dislike of "Divas", and being on a mission to make a statement. Later in the event, Vélez attacked Katarina Leigh after she and Maria Kanellis were defeated by The Beautiful People (Angelina Love and Velvet Sky).

In December, Vélez was revealed as the newest member of the Los Perros del Mal stable. Vélez made her debut as a representative of the stable on January 1, 2013, at a Perros del Mal independent event, where she teamed with Cósmico and Eita to defeat Celestial, Flamita and Sexy Lady. On April 21, Vélez defeated Alissa Flash to win the PWR Women's Championship. On May 11, she re-lost the title to Flash, who now works under the ring name Cheerleader Melissa.

On October 4, 2014, Vélez defeated Maria Kanellis to win the FWE Women's Championship. However, she lost the title the same night to Candice LeRae.

On November 28, 2014, Vélez made her Mexican debut with Lucha Libre AAA Worldwide (AAA), teaming with Faby Apache to defeat Sexy Star and Taya. Vélez worked the match as a fan favorite, opposite Taya, a representative of Los Perros del Mal, a stable she herself once represented.

=== Shine Wrestling (2012–present) ===
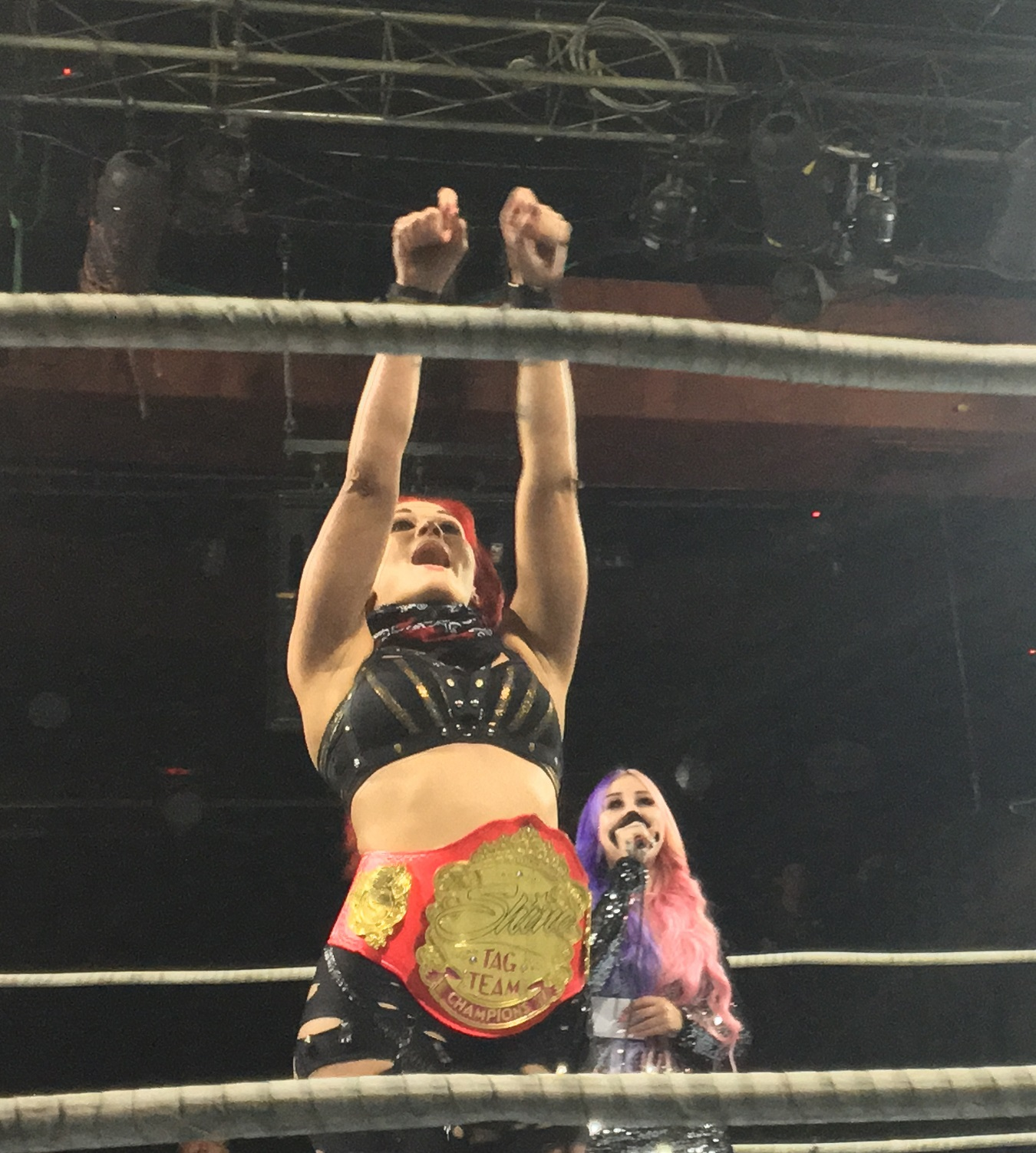
Vélez at Shine Championships in 2017

Vélez debuted in Shine Wrestling at Shine 5 on November 16, 2012, where she was defeated by Athena. At Shine 6, on January 11, 2013, Vélez defeated Su Yung. Later that night, the formation of the stable Valkyrie was revealed, consisting of Vélez, Rain, Allysin Kay, Taylor Made and April Hunter. At Shine 8, on March 23, Vélez and the rest of Valkyrie defeated the team of Amazing Kong, Angelina Love, Mia Yim and Christina Von Eerie. At Shine 9 on April 19, Vélez was defeated by Jazz in a Shine Championship tournament qualifying match. At Shine 16 on January 24, 2014, Vélez defeated Rain to win the Shine Championship. Following the match, Valkyrie turned on Vélez and kicked her out of the stable. Vélez went on to successfully defend the title against the likes of Mercedes Martinez, Leva Bates and Jazz, both on Shine pay-per-views and other promotion's events. At Shine 20, she defended her championship against Serena Deeb, wrestling to a one-hour time-limit draw. On November 16, 2014, on a WWNLive (Shine's parent company) show in China, Vélez lost the Shine Championship to Mia Yim.

At Shine 30 on October 2, 2015, Vélez returned to Shine and defeated Thunderkitty. At Shine 35 On June 17, 2016, Ivelisse won the Shine Championship for the second time by winning a four-way match involving Shine Champion Taylor Made, Shimmer Champion Madison Eagles and TNA Knockouts Champion Allysin Kay. On January 14, 2017, the title was vacated due to her injury. At Shine 64 on December 15, 2019, Ivelisse won the Shine Championship for the third time by defeating Mercedes Martinez. She successfully retained the title at Shine 65 and Shine 66.

=== Impact Wrestling (2012–2013) ===
On October 11, 2012, Vélez had a tryout match for Total Nonstop Action Wrestling (TNA), losing to Tara. On February 24, 2013, it was reported that Vélez would be competing in a TNA Gut Check match, in which she defeated Lei'D Tapa on the February 28 episode of Impact Wrestling. On the March 7 episode of Impact Wrestling, Vélez was eliminated from TNA Gut Check, thereby failing to earn a TNA contract.

Vélez returned to make limited appearances, including at One Night Only: Knockouts Knockdown, where she lost to Lei'D Tapa. Vélez also appeared at One Night Only: World Cup, as part of team Aces & Eights including D.O.C., Knux, Mr. Anderson and Wes Brisco. Vélez defeated Team USA's Mickie James, with help from Aces & Eights, to advance to the finals, where team Aces & Eights lost to Team USA.

=== Lucha Underground (2014–2019) ===
Vélez debuted on the November 5, 2014, episode of Lucha Underground, simply as Ivelisse, teaming with Son of Havoc in a loss to Sexy Star and Chavo Guerrero Jr. Ivelisse, Havoc and Angélico went on to form an alliance, and on February 8, 2015, the trio won a tournament to become the inaugural Lucha Underground Trios Champions. On the February 18 episode of Lucha Underground, Ivelisse earned her first singles victory against Angélico. During the time Ivelisse, Havoc and Angélico held the championships, they defended and successfully retained them against The Crew (Cortez, Castro and Bael) in a ladder match on the May 20 episode of Lucha Underground, and against Cage, DelAvar Daivari and Big Ryck on the June 3 episode, despite Ivelisse suffering from a legitimate foot injury. On July 29, at Ultima Lucha Part 1, they lost the championships to The Disciples of Death (Barrio Negro, Trece and El Sinestro de la Muerte), due to interference from Catrina.

On the Lucha Underground season 2 premiere on January 27, 2016, Ivelisse defeated Son of Havoc and Angélico to earn a Lucha Underground Championship match against Mil Muertes, but failed to capture the championship. At Ultima Lucha Dos Part 3, Catrina cost Ivelisse her match against Taya and then delivering the Lick of Death to Ivelisse. On the first episode of Lucha Underground Season 3, Ivelisse challenged Catrina to a match in Lucha Underground at Ultima Lucha Tres. At part 2 of Ultima Lucha Tres, Ivelisse defeated Catrina by pinfall.

In January 2019, Vélez stated Lucha Underground's production company would not release her from her multi-year contract (which excluded her from working for any other wrestling companies in the world), despite the show being on hiatus with no firm plans to resume production. She also said she had been trying to get a release for over a year. After a group of several wrestlers/cast members in the same situation filed a class action lawsuit against the show's producers, Vélez was released on March 26, 2019, as part of an out-of-court settlement of the lawsuit.

=== All Elite Wrestling (2019–2021) ===
Ivelisse made her AEW debut in its Women's Casino Battle Royal at the AEW All Out pay-per-view, on August 31, 2019. Ivelisse returned and made her AEW singles match debut on the July 22, 2020, episode of AEW Dynamite, losing to Diamante. The two were cast as a tag team for AEW's Women's Tag Team Cup Tournament after they both picked the same color token in The Deadly Draw. They advanced to the finals by defeating Rachael Ellering and Dasha Gonzalez in the first round, then Tay Conti and Anna Jay in the semi-finals. On the August 22, 2020, episode of Dynamite, they defeated The Nightmare Sisters (Allie and Brandi Rhodes) to win the tournament. On the September 11 episode of Dynamite, Ivelisse lost a title match to (at the time) NWA World Women's Champion Thunder Rosa. Ivelisse continued building a winning streak as a dominant Tag Team with Diamante and as a dominant Singles competitor. On April 14, 2021, Ivelisse announced AEW had released her after speaking up about backstage issues. She had mentioned she was even getting counseling at the time this happened. She still had not fully recovered from her house fire incident and many other compiled personal issues at the time. The abrupt exit ended an impressive winning streak both as a tag team and singles competitor on AEW Dark.

== Other media ==
Vélez appeared on an episode of Tattoo Nightmares, airing on Spike.

== Class action lawsuit against Lucha Underground ==
On February 6, 2019, it was reported that Ivelisse, Joey Ryan, Melissa Cervantes (Thunder Rosa) and Jorge Luis Alcantar (El Hijo del Fantasma/King Cuerno) had collectively filed a class-action lawsuit in California against the El Rey Network and the Baba-G production company producing the Lucha Underground TV series. The group claimed that their Lucha Underground contracts were illegal under state law because they unfairly restricted their ability to work in their chosen profession. The show's contracts with the wrestlers, though having different terms, all were multi-year deals that excluded them from performing for any other wrestling companies in the world. This became problematic when the producers ceased production after season three with no firm plans for when the hiatus would end, yet the wrestlers were obligated to stay available to LU and unavailable to work anywhere else until their contracts expired, or LU resumed production. Some wrestlers had signed 5-year contracts with LU when the show began, but the hiatus effectively banned them from wrestling anywhere else. Ivelisse stated she had been trying to get her release from the producers for over a year. After a group of several wrestlers/cast members in the same situation filed a class action lawsuit against the show's producers, Vélez was released on March 26, 2019, as part of an out-of-court settlement of the lawsuit.

== Championships and accomplishments ==
- All Elite Wrestling
  - AEW Women's Tag Team Cup (2020) – with Diamante
- Family Wrestling Entertainment
  - FWE Women's Championship (1 time)
- Immortal Championship Wrestling
  - ICW Women's Championship (1 time)
- Ladies Night Out
  - LNO Championship (1 time)
- Lucha Underground
  - Lucha Underground Trios Championship (2 times) – with Angélico and Son of Havoc
  - Lucha Underground Trios Championship Tournament (2015) – with Angélico and Son of Havoc
- Pro Championship Wrestling
  - PCW Women's Championship (2 times)
- Pro Wrestling Illustrated
  - Ranked No. 7 of the top 50 female wrestlers in the PWI Female 50 in 2014
- Pro Wrestling Revolution
  - PWR Women's Championship (1 time)
- Shine Wrestling
  - Shine Championship (4 times)
  - Shine Nova Championship (1 time)
  - Shine Tag Team Championship (1 time) – with Mercedes Martinez
- Southwestern Wrestling Entertainment
  - SWE Women's Championship (1 time)
- World Wrestling League
  - WWL Goddess Championship (1 time)
- Wrestling Superstar
  - Wrestling Superstar Women's Championship (1 time)
- Other titles
  - VWAA Women's Championship (3 times)
- Wrestling Observer Newsletter
  - Worst Gimmick (2013) Aces & Eights
