= Carlito (wrestler) =

Puerto Rican professional wrestler (born 1979)

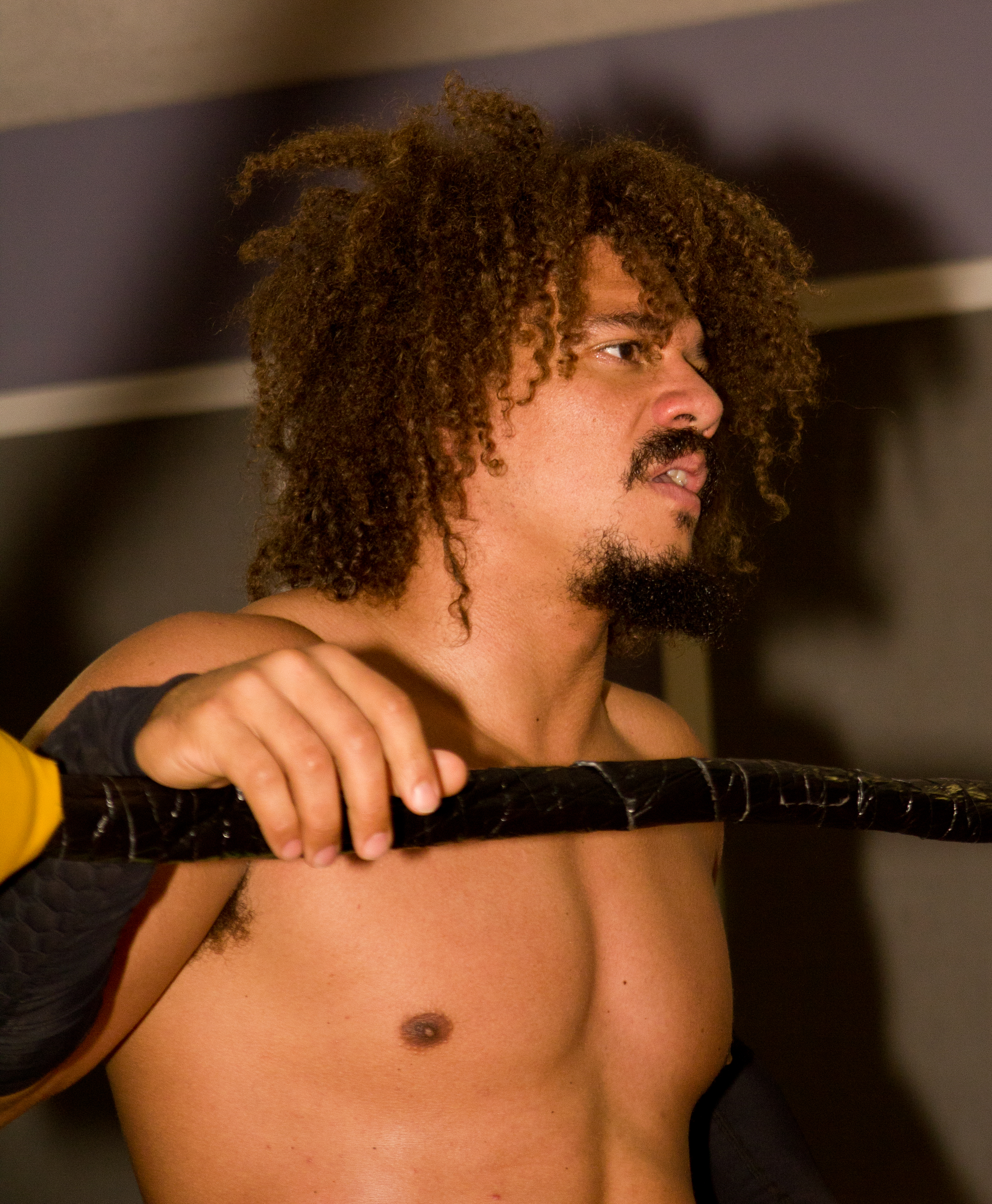
- Carlito in 2012

Personal information
- Born: Carlos Edwin Colón Coates Jr. February 21, 1979 (age 47) San Juan, Puerto Rico
- Parent: Carlos Colón (father)
- Relatives: Primo Colón (brother); Epico Colón (cousin)

Professional wrestling career
- Ring name(s): Carlito; Carlito Caribbean Cool; Carlito Colón; Carlitos; Carlos Colón; Carly Colón
- Billed height: 5 ft 10 in (1.78 m)
- Billed weight: 240 lb (110 kg)
- Billed from: The Caribbean; San Juan, Puerto Rico
- Trained by: Carlos Colón; Isaac Rosario
- Debut: November 27, 1999

Carlos Edwin Colón Coates Jr. (Note: In this Spanish name, the first or paternal surname is Colón and the second or maternal family name is Coates.) (born February 21, 1979), better known by his ring name Carlito Colón or simply Carlito, is a Puerto Rican professional wrestler. As of June 2025, He is signed to World Wrestling Council (WWC). He also makes appearances on the independent circuit. He is best known for his tenures in WWE.

He is a member of the Colón wrestling family, being the son of Carlos Colón. He made his debut for World Wrestling Council (WWC) in 1999, winning the WWC Universal Heavyweight Championship 17 times and the WWC Puerto Rico Heavyweight Championship twice. During the early years of his career, he made appearances for the X Wrestling Federation and Funking Conservatory, winning his first international championship with the latter.

In 2003, Colón signed a developmental contract with WWE. He worked in its developmental territory Ohio Valley Wrestling (OVW) for 16 months, mostly wrestling in tag team matches while making appearances in WWC. In October 2004, he made his main roster debut. He went on to become a one-time United States Champion and one-time Intercontinental Champion, and was part of both the Raw and SmackDown brands. He is the only wrestler to win a championship on two separate debuts in WWE and the second Puerto Rican wrestler (after Pedro Morales) to hold the Intercontinental Championship. At WrestleMania 25, Colón and his brother Primo unified the WWE Tag Team Championship and World Tag Team Championship as the Unified WWE Tag Team Championship before leaving WWE in May 2010. In 2021, Colón briefly returned to WWE, first as an entrant in the Royal Rumble and then the following night on Raw. He then returned in May 2023 at Backlash to assist Bad Bunny and the Latino World Order (LWO). Following this, Colón re-signed with WWE, but it was not until Fastlane that same year in October when he reappeared as the LWO's mystery tag team partner. Following his subsequent turning on the LWO, he joined The Judgement Day and remained a member until his departure in June 2025.

== Early life ==
Carlos Edwin Colón Coates Jr. was born in the Santurce district of San Juan on February 21, 1979, the son of Puerto Rican professional wrestler and World Wrestling Council founder Carlos Colón and his Canadian-born wife Nancy. He has three younger siblings, including fellow wrestlers Eddie (best known in the WWE as Primo) and Stacy Colón, both of whom performed in the World Wrestling Council. A second sister, Melissa, did not enter the wrestling business. Other members of Colón's family have also been involved in the World Wrestling Council, including his cousin Orlando (best known in WWE as Epico) and uncle José.

Colón graduated from the Jesuit school Colegio San Ignacio de Loyola in 1997. Unsatisfied with his physical conditioning, he joined a gym at the age of 11. He has said that he only did so for exercise and did not originally intend to become a wrestler. It was not until completing his college education that he decided to train, after noticing that his condition was on par with the wrestlers despite his age. Despite this, Colón initially expected to retire within a decade and go on to run a private business. He has admitted that, during this initial stage, he received peer pressure to match the accomplishments of his father.

== Professional wrestling career ==
=== World Wrestling Council (1999–2003) ===
In July 1999, Colón began working in the World Wrestling Council as a cameraman, then known by his actual nickname "Carly", being subtly introduced to the television programming. Soon after his first appearance, the promotion's main heel (or villainous) wrestler, Ray González, took an interest in him after learning his identity. After weeks of being pestered, Colón responded by punching González, which resulted in a beat-down by the dominant heel stable, La Familia del Milenio. At Aniversario 1999, Colón interrupted a match between González and Colón Sr., aiding his father by interrupting while wielding a shovel, which became his trademark weapon early in his career. The feud between Colón Sr. and González continued, with him interfering on his father's behalf. The final match of this feud concluded in the same manner that the first Aniversario encounter. Soon after, vignettes depicting him training with Isaac Rosario began airing in WWC's show, Superestrellas de la Lucha Libre. Colón made his in-ring debut in January 2000 by defeating Félix Tapia, a jobber and member of La Familia. He was immediately booked in a major push, defeating almost the entirety of the heel locker room during the following two weeks. Despite being active for less than three months, he earned the support of the WWC fanbase.

On January 29, 2000, Colón defeated González to become the youngest wrestler to win the WWC Universal Heavyweight Championship. González countered by creating a coalition of wrestlers that had feuded with Colón Sr. in the past, led by Hercules Ayala and Ramón Álvarez. On February 19, 2000, Colón dropped the Universal Heavyweight Championship to González, following intervention from Álvarez. This led to a double feud against Álvarez and Ayala, from which he emerged victorious. During this time frame, he also wrestled One Man Gang, who was involved a storyline where a $10,000 bounty was placed by La Familia to "end his career". On July 16, 2000, Colón defeated González to recover the championship in the main event of Aniversario, the promotion's anniversary event. This was followed with a feud with Curt Hennig, brought in by La Familia, who won the title by pinning him on September 30, 2000. Both met in a rematch the following event, with the championship being held-up following a time limit draw. On November 25, 2000, Colón recovered the belt by defeating Hennig in a no-disqualification contest without time limit. On December 3, 2000, Colón wrestled "The Botswana Beast" Benjamin Peacock to a double count out. In his next match, he defeated Horace Hogan.

González turned on Hennig and brought in Jerry Flynn to recapture the title. Colón won their first encounters, but Flynn won the Universal Heavyweight Championship on February 17, 2001. He resumed his feud with González, before migrating to another angle against La Familia's main tag team, Thunder and Lightning, composed of Reynaldo "Thunder" Rodríguez and Alex "Lightning" Cruz. Teaming with his father and brother, Eddie Colón, he earned a victory over them. Thunder and Lightning went on to turn on González, who then pursued a partnership with Colón, looking for him in several locations. At Aniversario 2001: Septiembre Negro, he teamed with González to defeat Thunder and Lightning. However, the partnership was short lived, with González turning on Colón and regaining control of La Familia. On November 13, 2001, Colón participated in the television tapings of the X Wrestling Federation. In his only appearance for the promotion, he defeated David Sierra. On December 1, 2001, Colón defeated González to win the Universal Heavyweight Championship, restarting the formula of bringing foreign wrestlers to challenge him.

His next feud was against Vampiro, winning the first encounters between them, but losing the title in a no-disqualification contest. A rematch ended in a double disqualification, with the belt being held-up after both assaulted the designated referee. To close this rivalry, Colón defeated Vampiro to regain the Universal Heavyweight Championship. On March 16, 2002, he teamed with his brother to defeat Thunder and Lightning and win the WWC World Tag Team Championship. Their reign only lasted a day, losing a rematch the following date. He subsequently formed an alliance with Konnan, winning the belts again on March 26, 2002, and holding them for nearly three months. After losing the titles back to Thunder and Lightning, Konnan turned on Colón by attacking his sister, Stacy Colón, with a guitar. He dropped the title in the ensuing feud, recovering it back on November 23, 2002. To open 2003, Colón lost the belt to José "Chicky Starr" Laureano, winning it back the following month. On March 15, 2003, he lost the championship to Sabu, before recovering it two weeks later. In May 2003, Colón wrestled in two tryout matches for World Wrestling Entertainment. His opponents were Tommy Dreamer and Jamie Noble, with both contests ending in a loss. Three different reports scouted his performance in a positive manner, with an official offer being made days after the initial appearances.

On June 2, 2003, Colón signed a developmental contract with WWE, being assigned to Ohio Valley Wrestling. He made a final appearance in WWC, winning a match over Mike Awesome at Aniversario 2003. Following this performance, Colón addressed the crowd and vacated the Universal Heavyweight Championship, with the next titleholder being decided in a tournament following his departure. The staff of WWC's main rival, the International Wrestling Association (IWA-PR), was surprised by the event due to the promotion's previous association with WWE. They expected the tryout to conclude with the same outcome that the ones that WWE held with their talents (Germán Figueroa, Ricky Banderas and Andy Anderson) without any offer being made, deciding to counter the signing's impact with a storyline that benefited from it. The following month in the tour to promote the Summer Attitude 2003 event, IWA-PR began announcing the arrival of the "son of a former world champion" and "legend that is universally recognized" to the promotion, which was heavily implied to be Colón, but actually served as a plot device to introduce David Flair. Before the identity was revealed, his music was played over the sound system, only for the crowd to be told by Savio Vega (Juan Rivera) that they should avoid "acting like morons".

=== World Wrestling Entertainment/ WWE (2003–2010) ===
==== Ohio Valley Wrestling (2003–2004) ====
Upon joining OVW, Colón performed under his nickname of "Carly" and later, "Carlos Colón, Jr.". His performance in OVW was intercalated by appearances in dark matches that took place before WWE's main shows. On October 14, 2003, he teamed with Dean in a dark match loss to Sean O'Haire and Matt Morgan that preceded WWE Velocity. In February 2004, Colón performed as a heel for the first time in his career by joining Bolin Services, a faction led by Kenny Bolin and completed by Shad Gaspard, Jerome Crony, Demond Thompson, Mike Mondo and fellow Puerto Rican Lourdes Guenard.

While working in OVW, Colón continued to appear in various World Wrestling Council events. Towards the year's end, he made sporadic appearances and feuded with the "Dominican Boy" Julio César López over the Universal Heavyweight Championship. Colón won a November encounter by disqualification, which prevented the title from changing hands. He won a rematch on December 20, 2003, and held on to the Universal Heavyweight Championship for two weeks, losing it to Abdullah the Butcher at WWC's Three Kings Weekend. During this timeframe, Colón also participated in several dark matches prior to Velocity and Sunday Night Heat, in the first teaming with Brent Dail in a loss to Jim Steele & Mike Barton and on the second losing to Johnny Jeter in singles. WWC scheduled him to wrestle Abyss on April 10, 2004, but WWE did not grant the permission to perform at the event, considering that it could be promoted as an interpromotional match against its rival, Total Nonstop Action Wrestling. Throughout March and May, Colón wrestled in dark matches for both the Raw and SmackDown! brands. The outcome of these unofficial presentations were wins over Paul London, Ruffy Silverstein, Wavell Starr and Ricky Reyes, also including losses to Hardcore Holly, Shoichi Funaki, Shannon Moore and Billy Kidman.

His work in OVW was a key plot device in WWC's main storyline of the year. On May 15, 2004, the promotion began a backstage angle where Enrique Cruz told Eddie Colón that Carly Colón was wrestling as a heel in OVW, only for José Rivera Jr. to dismiss it as "internet gossip". A subsequent phone conversation between brothers concluded without a direct response on the matter. On June 13, 2004, Carly Colón's role as a heel was made official in a segment where he told his sister that he was no longer interested in his father or the people of Puerto Rico. Consequently, Eddie Colón traveled to the United States to meet with his brother. Upon arriving to the hotel where Carly Colón was staying, he asked to contact him, but the clerk refused to attend him after receiving the response that "Mr. Colón says that he has no brother" and receiving no response upon knocking on the room door.

Eddie Colón was expelled from the hotel and tried to attend his brother's training, but he received the same response and was denied access, buying a ticket for an OVW show held that night. After the event's start, Carly Colón was shown arriving late and being scolded by Jim Cornette. This skit reflected real conflicts between both. Cornette has stated that during Colón's stay in OVW he considered him a very talented performer, capable of doing "great stuff" but only did it when he "was on" due to being used to be treated as "wrestling royalty" in his role of "the boss' son". Cornette went on to explain the limited role, saying that: "I didn't feature Carlito, because he thought that he was more advanced than the rest of the guys and was cruising... but that wasn't what I wanted to see". Colón rebuffed this by saying that "they could have done more" with him in OVW and that the reason no to do it was because "Jim Cornette [doesn't] like" him.

After noticing the hostile fan reaction and witnessing Carly's heel tactics from the public, Eddie Colón sneaked and waited by the locker rooms and confronted him, which resulted in a faceoff that concluded with the heel locker jumping him. Upon learning this, Colón Sr. travelled to Kentucky and interrupted an OVW scrimmage, which resulted in Carly Colón asking for his expulsion from the building. This served as setup for a feud between brothers, which saw Carly Colón return to Puerto Rico and mock the fans by stating that they would be "buying PPVs to see [him]" and using the recent Puerto Rico national basketball team's 19-point victory over the United States national basketball team to claim that they were "conformists" for celebrating a single win. The first match between brothers headlined Aniversario on August 21, 2004. Carly Colón won the match by faking a knee injury and then shoving his sister into Eddie Colón when she entered the ring to help, using the distraction to score the pinfall. Two rematches were held the following month at Fase 3, the first of which ended in a time limit draw. He lost the rubber match, which concluded with the heel factions assaulting both brothers and Colón Sr. futilely asking them to join forces.

In response to this angle, IWA-PR began hinting that Colón would be joining a heel stable known as "Capitol Sports" (borrowing the name that WWC used during the 1970s-90s), which in storyline was being covertly operated by González in cooperation with his "business partners" (a reference to Colón Sr. and Jovica) with the intention of taking over the promotion. In a segment of their television show, the company ran a script where a surprise arrival was announced, which was promoted as "a young wrestler [...] with a tremendous future in the United States [...] who has Capitol flowing through veins" and with whom González had differences in the past that were overcome when he opened his eyes (in reference to WWC's heel turn) so that he could "complete" an unspecified task in the invasion. IWA-PR further mocked Colón in a skit where Savio Vega dismissed this revelation, citing that he had video evidence of a match where Flash Flanagan (who was active in the promotion performing as "Slash Venom") pinned him at OVW. This angle was concluded in a segment where González berated an unknown individual during a call for being unable to appear in a card, claiming that "he [was] a failure like [his] father and brother".

==== United States Champion (2004–2005) ====
In preparation for his debut, the WWE's creative team began testing different characters for him to use. The first attempt involved the promotion filing copyrights for the use of "Carlitos Colón", which is the nickname commonly associated with his father in Puerto Rico. On June 7, 2004, Colón wrestled under this name in a dark match, this time losing to Sean Morley. However, later that month, the name was modified to Carlito Colón and he was given the gimmick of a metrosexual man, originally intending to team him with Rico Constantino upon being promoted. However, this idea was dropped when Constantino was legitimately injured in a match.

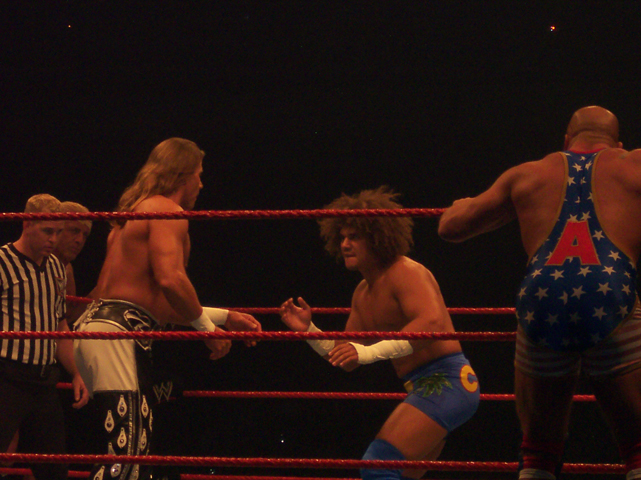
Carlito and Kurt Angle facing off against Shawn Michaels and Ric Flair at a WWE house show

On October 7, 2004, Colón made his debut as a heel on SmackDown! as "Carlito Caribbean Cool" (though later shortened to simply "Carlito"), whose gimmick was an apple toting big mouth who would spit apple "in the face of people who don't want to be cool". Carlito defeated John Cena for the United States Championship in his first match on the main roster. He immediately entered an undefeated streak of 14 contests, during which he successfully defended the title against Rob Van Dam, Rey Mysterio, Eddie Guerrero and Hardcore Holly. Carlito was then involved in a storyline where his bodyguard Jesús stabbed Cena in a nightclub. Carlito held the United States Championship for forty-two days, losing it back to Cena on the November 18 episode of SmackDown! after suffering a legitimate injury.

While Carlito was recovering from an injury, he was kept on television and got involved in a comical angle with SmackDown!'s general manager, Theodore Long. The storyline consisted of Carlito being forced to do demeaning chores around the arena, such as selling hot dogs, removing snow from parking lots with a shovel and mopping floors. As a result of these actions, Carlito created a petition in support of Long's destitution, but was unsuccessful. Carlito made his WrestleMania debut in a non-wrestling role at WrestleMania 21 on April 3, 2005, in which he interrupted an edition of Rowdy Roddy Piper's Piper's Pit, with Stone Cold Steve Austin as the special guest. Following WrestleMania, Carlito created an interview segment entitled Carlito's Cabana. Carlito then entered a feud with The Big Show after Big Show refused an offer to work in an enforcer role for Carlito. This feud involved Carlito tricking Big Show into eating a poisoned apple, and Matt Morgan becoming Carlito's enforcer. This feud ended with Carlito defeating Big Show at Judgment Day on May 22 after interference from Morgan.

==== Intercontinental Champion (2005–2006) ====
Carlito was drafted to the Raw brand in the 2005 WWE draft lottery. He made his brand debut on the June 20 episode of Raw in which he defeated Shelton Benjamin for the Intercontinental Championship. He then lost the Intercontinental title to Ric Flair at Unforgiven on September 18. Towards the end of 2005, Carlito was involved in a brand rivalry which led to him discontinuing Carlito's Cabana. The angle concluded with Carlito wrestling for Team Raw against Team SmackDown! in a Survivor Series match at Survivor Series on November 27, which Team Raw lost.

In late 2005, Carlito was added to angles involving the WWE Championship. After defeating Shelton Benjamin in a qualifying match, Carlito was added to the main event at New Year's Revolution on January 8, 2006, the Elimination Chamber match. He was one of the final two wrestlers remaining, after eliminating Kane, Chris Masters and Shawn Michaels. He then lost the match to John Cena. Following New Year's Revolution, Carlito and Chris Masters joined forces as a tag team. Together they competed against Big Show and Kane for the World Tag Team Championship at WrestleMania 22 on April 2. Carlito and Masters lost when Masters accidentally attacked Carlito. Following the match, Carlito confronted Masters, igniting a feud between them. Carlito turned face when he attacked Chris Masters after his "Masterlock Challenge" the next night on Raw. This storyline came to a conclusion at Backlash on April 30, where Carlito defeated Masters via an illegal assist from the ropes.

==== Various feuds (2006–2008) ====
At Vengeance on June 25, Carlito fought in a Triple Threat match against Shelton Benjamin and Johnny Nitro for Benjamin's Intercontinental title. Nitro won the match after pulling Carlito outside of the ring and pinning him. Following Vengeance, Carlito began an on-screen relationship with Trish Stratus. He also engaged in a short feud with Johnny Nitro and Melina, which ended after Carlito and Stratus defeated Nitro and Melina in a mixed tag team match on the July 15 episode of Saturday Night's Main Event. Carlito next feuded with Randy Orton, following a spot where Orton attempted to attack Stratus during a backstage segment. The two wrestlers were booked for a match at Unforgiven on September 17 and a rematch on Raw; Orton won both matches. The feud concluded in a match at WWE's annual Tribute to the Troops event, where Carlito won by pinfall. The angle involving Carlito's relationship with Trish Stratus lasted until Stratus' retirement from wrestling following Unforgiven.

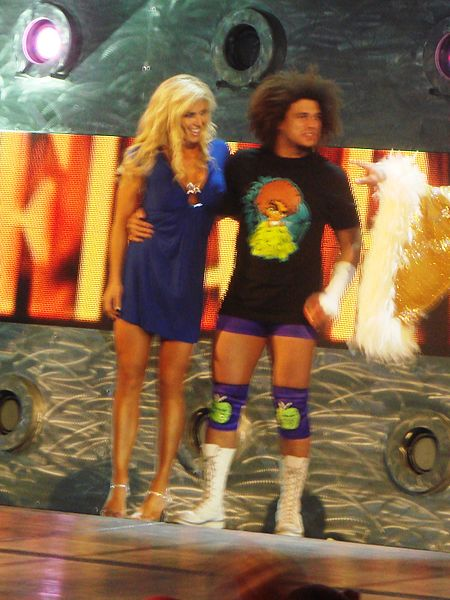
Carlito and Torrie Wilson were an on-screen couple in 2006 and 2007

In the final months of 2006, Carlito competed in several matches involving the Intercontinental Championship. His involvement in this angle ended at Cyber Sunday on November 5, after being elected by the fans to face Jeff Hardy for the championship. Carlito, however, lost the match. During this time period Carlito's gimmick underwent a slight change and was sold as a "ladies man", eventually getting involved in another fictional relationship with Torrie Wilson. Carlito participated in the Royal Rumble match at the Royal Rumble on January 28, 2007, where he was eliminated by The Great Khali. Following the Royal Rumble, Carlito started a feud with Ric Flair, in which Flair insulted Carlito for leaving a show early by claiming that he had no heart, no passion and was undeserving of his spot on the roster. After Carlito challenged and lost to Flair in a match, they were booked as a tag team, with Flair serving as a mentor to Carlito. The team was involved in a Money in the Bank qualifying match which was declared a "no contest" after The Great Khali interfered. This led to a triple threat match the following week which included and was won by Randy Orton.

Prior to WrestleMania 23 on April 1, Colón expressed dissatisfaction with WWE management in an interview for not having plans to book him to appear at the pay-per-view and criticized their methods for selecting performers to push, making reference to backstage politics. Carlito, however, did participate in a dark match at WrestleMania, winning in a tag team match with Flair as his partner against the team of Chavo Guerrero and Gregory Helms. The team also lost a number one contender's match for the World Tag Team Championship against Lance Cade and Trevor Murdoch. Carlito turned on Flair after the loss, which turned him heel again. Their feud ended with a match at Judgment Day on May 20, where Carlito lost to Flair by submission. Colón appeared in the World Wrestling Council's Aniversario 2007 event where he faced Scott Hall, who retook his WWE gimmick, Razor Ramon, for the first time since leaving the promotion in 1996. As a way to promote the match, Hall claimed that the "Carlito Caribbean Cool" character was an imitation of him, giving it the nickname "Mini Razor". Colón defeated Ramon with his Back Stabber finisher, in a match that included interference by the then-Universal Heavyweight Champion Apolo. All three were involved in a three-way match for the title the following day, which concluded with Ramon pinning Apolo.

Following his feud with Flair he was involved in angles with The Sandman and Triple H. He then lost to Triple H at Unforgiven on September 16 in a no disqualification match where the no disqualification rule only applied to Carlito. In late 2007, Colón requested his release from the WWE as he was unhappy with the direction of his character. Following a meeting with Vince McMahon, however, he was convinced to stay. On the December 10 episode of Raw, he was featured in a ladder match at the Raw 15th Anniversary against Jeff Hardy for the WWE Intercontinental Championship, which Hardy won. Carlito defeated Cody Rhodes to qualify for the Money in the Bank ladder match at WrestleMania XXIV on March 30, 2008. He failed to win at WrestleMania. Carlito then formed a tag team with Santino Marella. The team was placed in several matches involving the World Tag Team Championship, twice being named the number one contenders; however, they lost the relevant championship matches.

==== The Colóns (2008–2010) ====
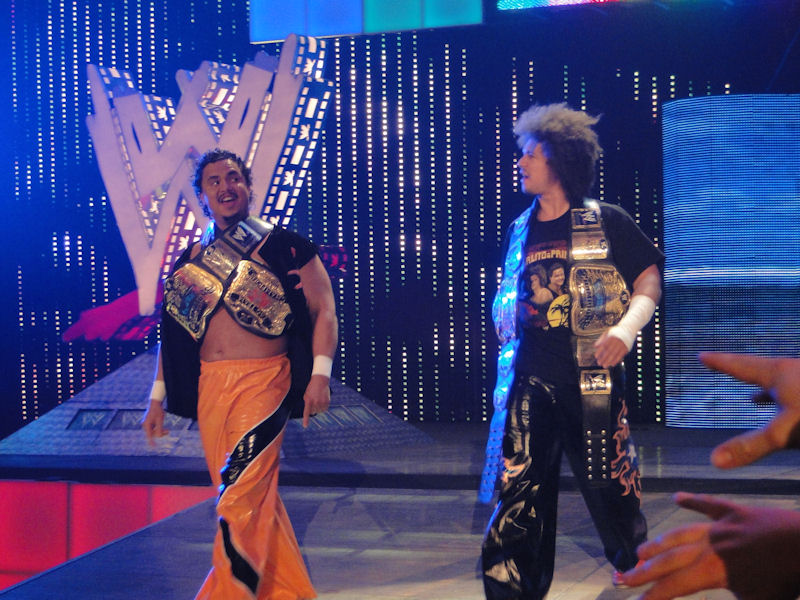
The Colóns as the Unified WWE Tag Team Champions

As part of the 2008 WWE Supplemental Draft, Carlito was drafted back to the SmackDown brand. After the draft, he asked for a vacation, using this time to attend his father's official retirement ceremonies at Aniversario 2008, where he also wrestled against Ray González.

On September 12, he re-debuted on the brand turning face, forming a tag team with his brother, Primo. They defeated WWE Tag Team Champions Curt Hawkins and Zack Ryder in the match to gain their first victory as a team. Two weeks later, both teams competed in a title match, with The Colóns winning to become WWE Tag Team Champions. Subsequently, Carlito and Primo entered a feud with World Tag Team Champions John Morrison and The Miz. At WrestleMania 25, The Colóns defeated Miz and Morrison in a tag team unification match, becoming the first team to simultaneously hold both sets of the company's Tag Team Championships since their creation.

On April 15, 2009, both Carlito and Primo were drafted back to the Raw brand as part of the 2009 Supplemental Draft. At The Bash, the duo dropped the Unified Tag Team Titles to Edge and Chris Jericho in a Triple Threat Tag Team Match also involving Ted DiBiase and Cody Rhodes. Carlito and Primo invoked their rematch clause the next night on Raw, but were unsuccessful. On the July 6 episode of Raw, following their loss to Edge and Jericho, Carlito turned heel by attacking Primo. At Night of Champions, Carlito challenged for the United States Championship in a Six-Pack Challenge, which also involved Primo, but neither of them were able to win the title. On the August 3 episode of Raw, Carlito defeated Primo to end their feud. On the August 13 episode of WWE Superstars, Carlito teamed with Rosa Mendes to defeat Kofi Kingston and Mickie James. Mendes would then become Carlito's manager until she was traded to the ECW brand in September. After a two-month hiatus, on the November 30 episode of Raw, Carlito returned to confront John Cena, after Cena challenged Sheamus to come out to the ring, telling him everyone on the roster were tired of him and that Sheamus was their representative of what the roster believed and then tried to spit apple in Cena's face, which led to him getting hit with Cena's finisher, the Attitude Adjustment. The following week, Carlito was defeated by Cena.

In February 2010, Carlito was announced as one of the eight WWE Pros for the first season of WWE NXT. On the February 22 episode of Raw, Carlito was defeated by Christian in a Money in the Bank Qualifying match. The next night on WWE NXT, Carlito teamed with his NXT Rookie Michael Tarver in a losing effort against Christian and his NXT Rookie Heath Slater. On the May 6 episode of WWE Superstars, during his match with Primo, Carlito would stop the match and told Primo they shouldn't fight when the crowd cheers for two brothers to fight each other. Primo would agree and reunite with his brother, turning heel in the process. On the May 10 episode of Raw, Carlito and Primo attacked R-Truth for Ted DiBiase, who paid them afterwards. On May 21, Colón was released due to a violation of the WWE Wellness Program and refusal to attend a rehabilitation facility for a reported addiction to pain killers.

=== Return to WWC (2010–2020) ===
==== CCC and Rey Fénix (2010–2014) ====
On July 11, 2010, Colón was booked in a match called "The Three Faces of Fear" at WWC's Aniversario 2010 which also involved Booker T. The concept of this contest was that he would face three unknown adversaries successively. Colón also performed on a second date of this event, working under a "tweener" concept, representing a morally ambiguous team without clear allegiance. He returned to WWC on September 25, 2010, at the "Septiembre Negro" event, where he defeated "El Triple Mega Campeón" Ricky Banderas. On November 27, 2010, Colón defeated Shelton Benjamin to win the WWC Universal Heavyweight Championship at the Crossfire event. He made his first title defense against Banderas at WWC's last show of the year—Lockout. On January 8, 2011, Colón lost the Universal Heavyweight Championship to Banderas, following interference from Shane Sewell. On June 4, 2011, Carlito returned to WWC and defeated Steve Corino to win the WWC Universal Heavyweight Championship for the thirteenth time. On July 17, 2011, at Aniversario 2011 Carlito made his first defense of the title against Abyss. In this event, Savio Vega cut a promo pursuing a feud as part of the first interpromotional angle between WWC and IWA-PR. However, this cooperation was stalled due to differences between the administration of both promotions, remaining fruitless for the rest of the year.

On October 28, 2011, Colón returned to WWC first to join his brother and wrestled Gilbert Cruz and his cousin Orlando Colón, before successfully defending the Universal Heavyweight Championship against Masters the following night. On November 11, 2011, he won a rematch. At WWC's Euphoria 2012, he wrestled in a rematch against Banderas, which was left inconclusive when a video depicting Vega was shown in the titantron, draining the time limit. Colón dropped the Universal Heavyweight Championship to Gilbert at Noche de Campeones 2012, failing to win it back in a rematch held at Camino a la Gloria. In this event, he also aided Ray González, which resulted in both receiving an invitation to join La Nueva Familia, a recreation of La Familia del Milenio, proposed by Félix "Barrabás" López. González refused this approach, claiming that it was returning to the past. On May 12, 2012, Colón also declined the invitation by spitting an apple in López's face, who countered by ordering Thunder and Lightning to ambush both him and González during a number one contendership match. At Aniversario 2012, Colón and González defeated Thunder and Lightning, unmasking them for the first time in their career. They teamed once again, but lost a rematch by disqualification. At Septiembre Negro, a third and final encounter was set in a liberation match. Colón was the one to be handcuffed to the ring apron, turning on González upon being released and assaulting Carlos Colón Sr. when he tried to interfere.

During the following weeks, vignettes aired where he berated members of his own family, eventually being confronted by José Huertas González. On October 7, 2012, Savio Vega reappeared in Superestrellas de la Lucha Libre, issuing yet another challenge. However, this time Colón fired back with a challenge of his own, inviting Vega to a special edition of Carlito's Cabana. The edition of Carlito's Cabana that featured Vega took place on October 14, 2012. In the segment, both traded insults and it finished with the security removing Vega when he tried to assault Colón after the former spat an apple in his face. At Halloween Wrestling Xtravaganza he was disqualified, assaulting his opponent after his father, who served as special referee, did not allow Huertas González to use his finisher. At Honor vs. Traición, Colón unsuccessfully challenged Ray González for the Universal Heavyweight Championship. A Hair vs. Hair rematch was immediately scheduled for Lockout, which will feature a guest referee elected by popular vote between Vega and Huertas González. The following night marked the first time that Colón participated in a match where his father was among his opponents, but he avoided facing him directly, instead requesting a tag and only entering later to pin González.

During this time frame, an angle began in which Colón began pursuing the ownership of WWC. This led to the creation of the Carlito Caribbean Company (CCC), which acquired power when Rivera defeated Victor Jovica following a Huertas González heel turn to force him to sell WWC's stocks. Despite Rivera's involvement as a favored heel, Colón was booked in a spot where the new CCC management turned on him. The ownership of WWC was to be decided in a match between Huertas González and Colón Sr. held on June 29, 2013, at Summer Madness in which CCC lost its bid. In the same event, Colón faced Rivera for the first time, dominating throughout the match but losing after being sprayed in the face with "green mist". On July 13, 2013, he won a rematch by countering this same tactic. On August 18, 2013, Colón issued an open challenge for Aniversario 40, calling himself a "Puerto Rican icon". The following week the challenge was accepted by Sting, a former WCW and TNA world heavyweight champion commonly known as "The Icon". When Colón was preparing to finish the match with the Back Stabber, a masked wrestler known as Rey Fénix intervened and cost him the match. Since that mask was usually worn by Ray González, he began pursuing a match against him. On November 16, 2013, Colón defeated Fénix in a Hair vs. Mask match that served as the main event of Crossfire. However, when Rey Fénix unmasked, he was Ricky Santana instead of González.

==== Various championship reigns (2014–2019) ====
At Lockout 2013, Colón defeated Germán Figueroa but lost to Rivera, who was now wrestling under a character known as "TNT". After losing two consecutive matches to Ray González, he was able to win a tag team match where he joined Huertas González. However, after the event was over his partner turned on him, forcing a face switch and beginning a new feud. He joined Ray González to win the first match of this storyline. Afterwards, Huertas González challenged Colón to place his hair on the line, but was ignored on several occasions. The wager became official following the outcome of a match that made it mandatory. On March 30, 2014, Colón defeated Huertas González in a one-sided bet match, remaining undefeated in matches where his hair was at risk. On July 19, 2014, Carlito defeated TNT to win his first WWC Puerto Rico Heavyweight Championship. In July, he participated in WWC's Wrestlefest held at St. Marteen, advancing to the final of the Caribbean Cup Tournament before losing to Jerry Lawler. On October 10, 2014, Colón lost the title against Gilbert. The following month he wrestled Mighty Ursus to a double count out as part of a new feud. This extended to Aniversario where Colón lost to the latter in a failed titular as part of a lackluster tour that also included a double count out against Hernandez.

At Lockout, he defeated Mighty Ursus in a cage match to win the Universal Heavyweight Championship. To open 2015, he retained in a Euphoria encounter where the ring was surrounded by fire. However, Ray González capitalized on this to win the belt the following night. The result proved controversial and Colón was able to defeat both González and Mighty Ursus in a three-way match at La Hora de la Verdad to regain it. The latter, however, remained successful against him and won a non-titular encounter that granted an inconclusive shot at the title. During the Camino a la Gloria tour, Chicano unseated Colón as Universal Heavyweight Champion, making way for another encounter against Mighty Ursus. Afterwards, his feud with González continued, facing both him and the teenage Ray González Jr. in singles and tag team matches. Colón's perennial rival opened the Summer Madness tour by winning an ambulance match. Despite only defeating moscardee Xix Xavant, he received another opportunity for the Universal Heavyweight Championship within two months, which saw Mr. 450 retain. At Aniversario 2016, Colón defeated Apolo and had another unsuccessful shot inside a cage, closing the event with a loss in a four-way Texas tornado match where the champion and other challengers competed.

On January 9, 2016, Colón defeated Chicano to become the first contender to the Universal Heavyweight Championship. He successfully cashed in on this opportunity to earn the title again. On April 30, 2016, Colón defeated Bobby Lashley to retain the Universal Heavyweight Championship. He then defeated Roger Díaz, whose “El Sensacional” Carlitos character had been created as a parody of Carlos Colón Sr. in IWA-PR, to remain titleholder. At Noche de Campeones 2016, Colón defeated Rey Mysterio and Mr. 450 to retain the Universal Heavyweight Championship. His feud with the latter extended throughout September and resulted in the title being vacated. However, Colón emerged from the series as champion after winning a rematch. He opened Aniversario by winning a matchup against Monster Pain, who returned to WWC after a prolonged absence that included a reign as WWL World Heavyweight Champion. In the main night of the tour, Colón defeated Jeff Hardy to retain the Universal Heavyweight Championship. However, he was immediately placed in a feud against Alberto Del Rio, who managed to win a non-titular encounter. Colón closed the year with two double countouts at Lockout, the first against MVP and the second against “El Patrón”, which led to the title being vacated.

At Euphoria 2017, Colón and Del Rio wrestled to a no contest in a titular match. Afterwards, his feud with González reignited and led to multiple double disqualifications. On March 27, 2017, Colón defeated Gilbert to become the first contender to the Universal Heavyweight Championship. The passing of Hurricane Maria while he was immersed in an international tour led to a prolonged absence from WWC, which eventually returned at Camino a la Gloria in March 2018. In this event, Colón lost to Apolo. Returning during the summer for Aniversario, he failed to dethrone Mighty Ursus and lost an encounter with Jack Swagger. At Lockout, Colón defeated The Tahitian Warrior.

==== Colón cousins WWC administration (2019) ====
At Euphoria 2019, The Colóns reunited in a win over the champion and Gilbert. At Aniversario 2019, Colón defeated Eli Drake. After a brief rivalry with El Hijo de Dos Caras, he was placed in the titular stage again. However, since Orlando Colón won the Universal Heavyweight Championship and his brother was also interested in the belt, all three cousins clashed for the first time in a match that saw the titlist retain. Colón's first home appearance of 2020 resulted in a lost to Gilbert, the main associate of the now-heel Eddie Colón as part of a stable known as The Dynasty. On February 29, 2020, WWC aired a segment in which Nick Aldis announced a defense of the NWA World Heavyweight Championship as part of Alianza Letal, the first card held jointly by WWC and IWA-PR as part of a business agreement. Colón was selected as the challenger.

=== Independent circuit (2010–2023) ===
Following his release, Colón began accepting dates to work for independent promotions. On August 7, 2010, he made his debut in Lucha Libre USA's live shows, wrestling as "Carlitos".

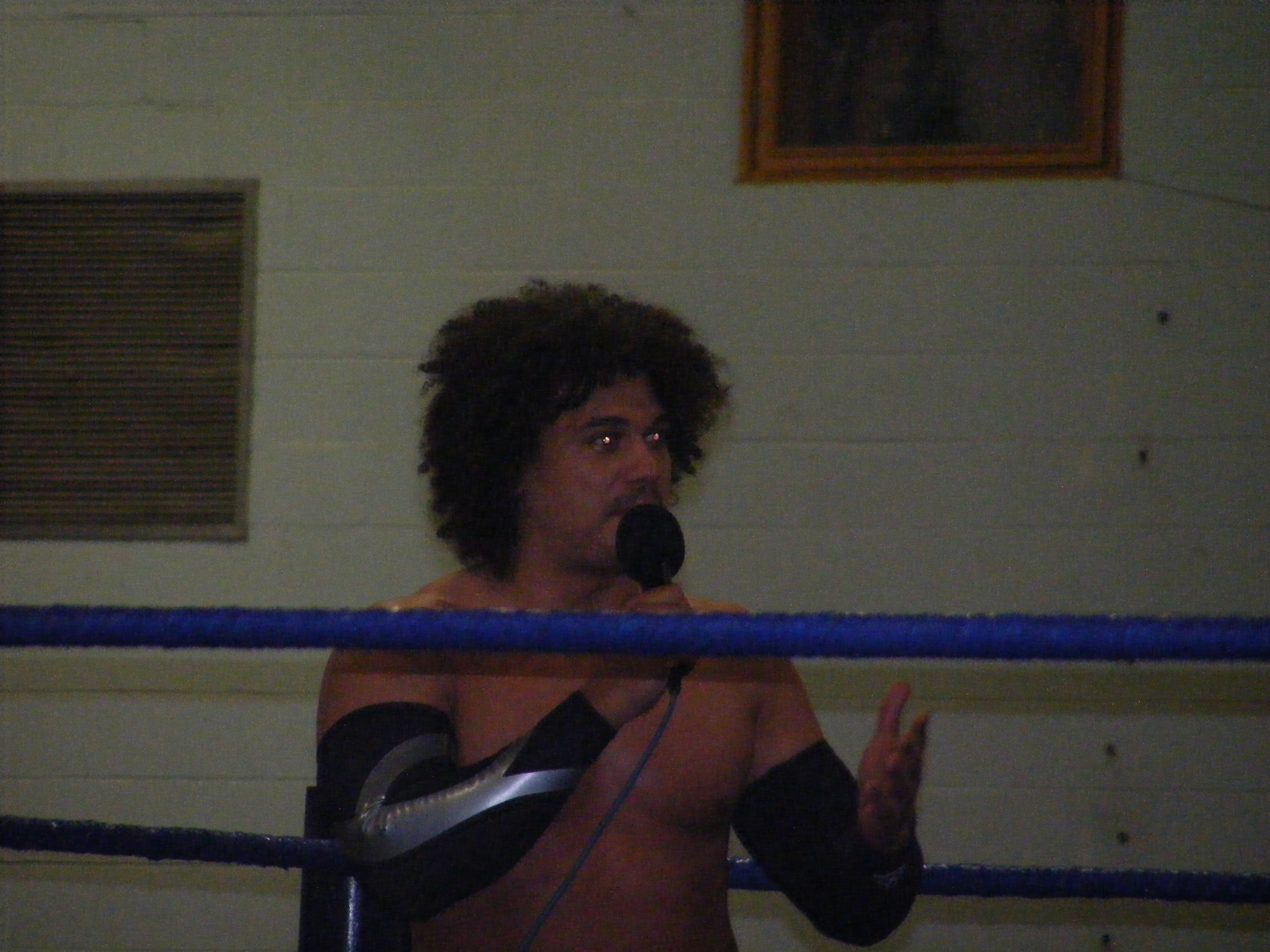
Colón making an independent appearance in 2011.

Colón won Family Wrestling Entertainment's Heavyweight Championship on October 6, 2012, in main event of House of Hardcore's first show, defeating previous champions Tommy Dreamer and Mike Knox in a three-way match. In March 2013, Colón won the Millennium Wrestling Federation's Undisputed Championship. He had previously performed for the promotion, mostly in matches involving Benny Jux (David Bentubo) between 2011 and 2012. On June 21, 2013, he dropped the FWE Heavyweight Championship to John Hennigan.

=== International tours (2010–2014) ===
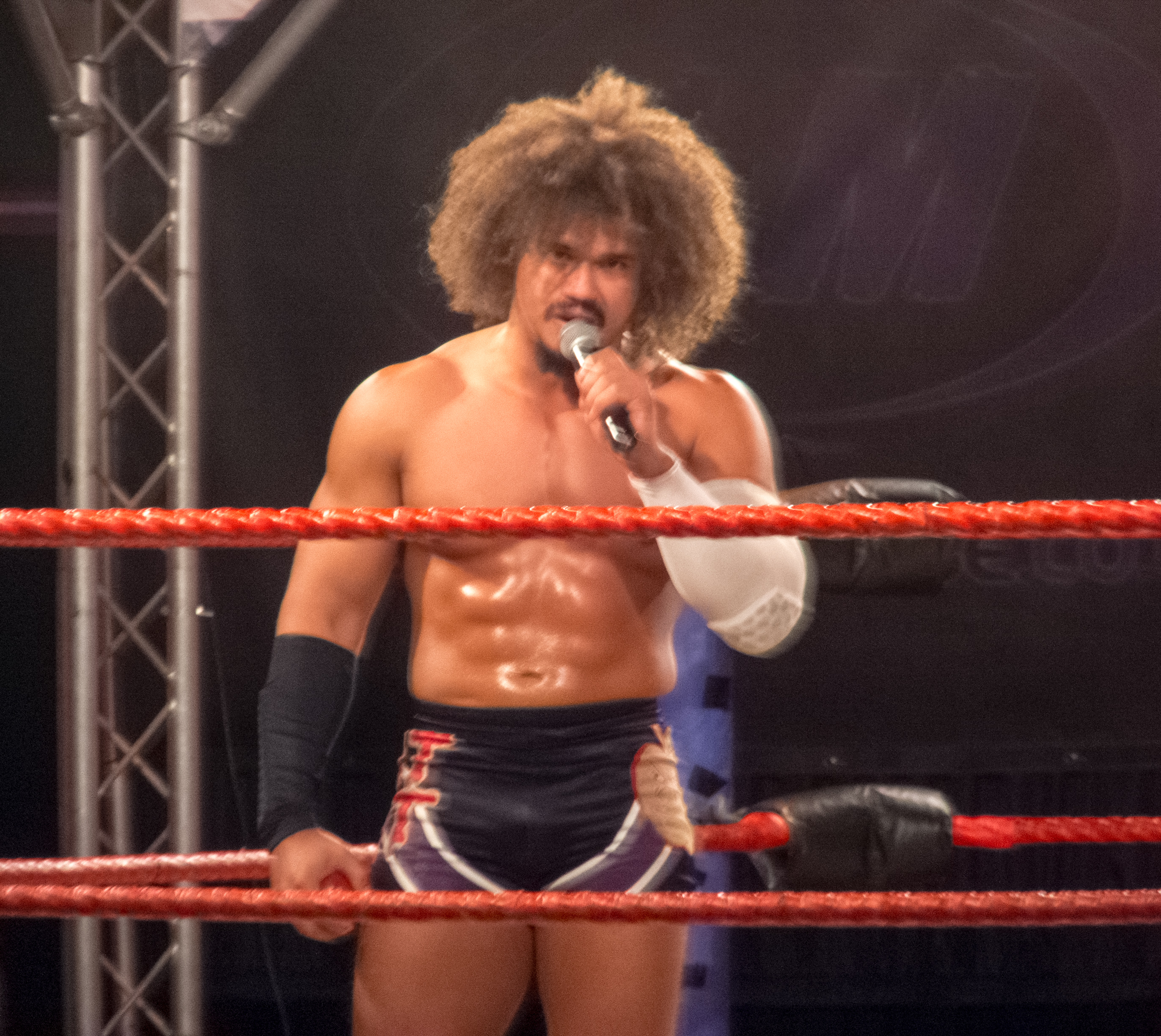
Carlito at the London Troxy for IPW:UK Revolution Event in April 2012

Upon becoming a free agent in 2010, Colón began traveling throughout the world, frequently making tours by country or region. He participated in Inoki Genome Federation in Japan, and the Mexican promotion Lucha Libre AAA World Wide (AAA), where he participated in the Rey de Reyes 2011.

On October 26, 2012, he made a one-night appearance for Wrestling New Classic (WNC) in Japan, losing to Tajiri in the first round of the WNC Championship tournament. On September 6, 2013, he made his debut for the World Wrestling League (marking the first time that he performed for another Puerto Rico-based promotion) as part of a tour of Mexico.

=== Return to WWE (2021, 2023–2025) ===
On January 31, 2021, at Royal Rumble, Carlito returned and entered the Royal Rumble match at number 8 as a face, where he was eliminated by Elias. The following night on Raw, Carlito teamed up with Jeff Hardy in his first match on Raw since 2010 to face off against Elias and Jaxson Ryker, in a winning effort.

Carlito would appear in 2023 at the events Backlash (which took place in San Juan, Puerto Rico) and Fastlane, working with the latino stable Latino World Order (LWO). Carlito signed a contract with WWE, and began a feud with Santos Escobar. After WrestleMania XL, Carlito turned heel and left LWO. During night 2 of the WWE Draft, Carlito was drafted to WWE Raw. As part of the Raw brand, Carlito became a member of The Judgment Day after SummerSlam. Carlito competed in the 2025 Andre the Giant Memorial Battle Royal, being eliminated by R-Truth in what would be his last match in WWE. Carlito's WWE contract expired in June, ending his second run with the company.

=== Second return to WWC (2025–present) ===
On May 31, 2025, Carlito returned to WWC at Summer Madness, where he defeated Ray González to win the WWC Puerto Rico Heavyweight Championship for the second time.

== Filmography ==
Year	Title	Role	Notes
2017–2019	GLOW	Big Kurt Jackson	5 episodes, credited as Carlos Edwin
2018	The Edge & Christian Show That Totally Reeks Of Awesomeness	Himself	1 episode
2019	The Goldbergs	Spur Wielding	1 episode

== Championships and accomplishments ==
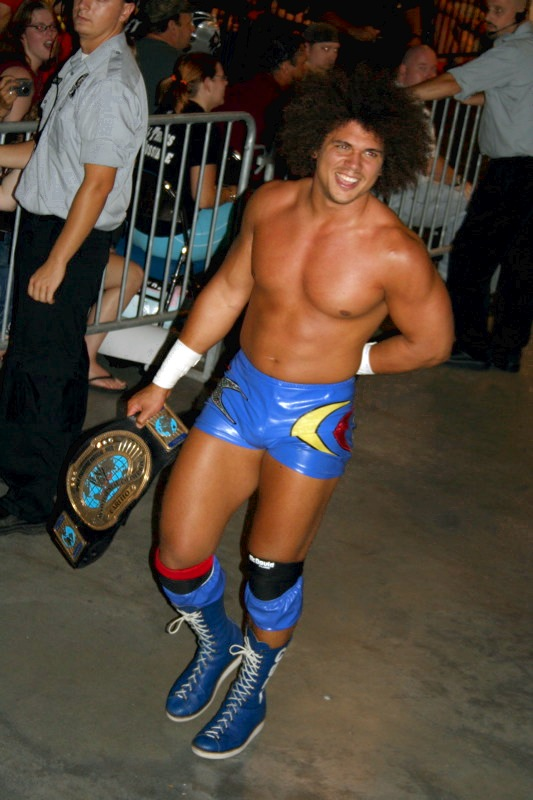
Carlito is a former Intercontinental Champion

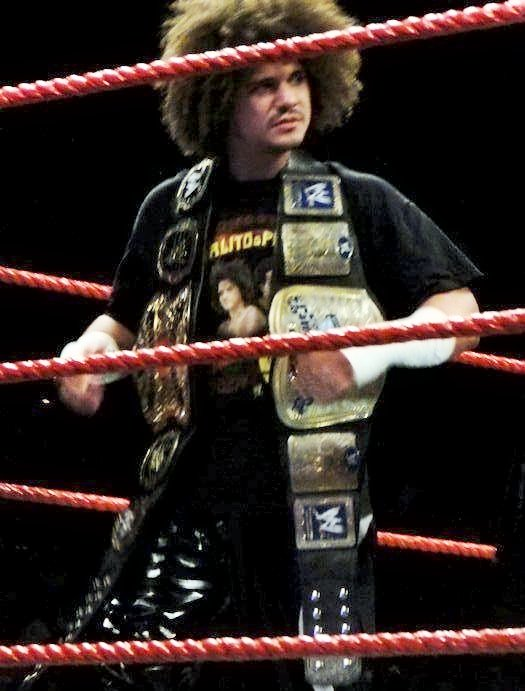
Carlito holding the Unified WWE Tag Team Championship

- All-Star Wrestling Australia
  - ASWA Heavyweight Championship (1 time)
- Big Time Wrestling
  - BTW Heavyweight Championship (1 time)
- Family Wrestling Entertainment
  - FWE Heavyweight Championship (1 time)
- First Wrestling Society
  - 1WS World Heavyweight Championship (1 time)
- Funking Conservatory
  - FC Television Championship (1 time)
- German Wrestling Federation
  - GWF Berlin Championship (1 time)
- Imperio Lucha Libre
  - Imperio World Championship (1 time, inaugural)
  - Imperio World Championship Tournament (2017)
- International Wrestling Association Florida
  - IWA Florida Heavyweight Championship (1 time)
- Italian Wrestling Superstars
  - IWS Intercontinental Championship (1 time)
- Magnum Pro Wrestling
  - Magnum Heavyweight Championship (1 time)
- Millennium Wrestling Federation
  - MWF Undisputed Championship (1 time)
- Pro Wrestling Experience
  - PWE United States Championship (1 time)
- Pro Wrestling Illustrated
  - PWI ranked him #27 of the 500 best singles wrestlers of the year in the PWI 500 in 2006
- Pure Wrestling Association
  - PWA Elite Championship (1 time)
- Qatar Pro Wrestling
  - QPW Tag Team Championship (1 time) – with Chris Masters
- United Pro Wrestling
  - UPW Championship (1 time, inaugural)
  - UPW Championship Tournament (2017)
- Wrestling Alliance Revolution
  - WAR World Heavyweight Championship (1 time)
- World Wrestling Council
  - WWC Universal Heavyweight Championship (17 times)
  - WWC Puerto Rico Heavyweight Championship (2 veces)
  - WWC Caribbean Heavyweight Championship (1 time)
  - WWC World Tag Team Championship (2 times) – with Eddie Colón (1) and Konnan (1)
- World Wrestling Entertainment
  - WWE United States Championship (1 time)
  - WWE Intercontinental Championship (1 time)
  - WWE Tag Team Championship (1 time) – with Primo
  - World Tag Team Championship (1 time) – with Primo

=== Luchas de Apuestas record ===
Winner (wager)	Loser (wager)	Location	Event	Date	Notes
Carly Colón and Ray González (hair)	Thunder and Lightning (masks)	Bayamón, Puerto Rico	WWC Aniversario 39	July 1, 2012	
Carly Colón (hair)	Ray González (hair)	Bayamón, Puerto Rico	WWC Lockout	December 9, 2012	
Carly Colón (hair)	Rey Fénix (mask)	Bayamón, Puerto Rico	WWC Crossfire	November 16, 2013	
