= WWC Euphoria =

Annual World Wrestling Council event in Puerto Rico

WWC Euphoria is an annual professional wrestling event promoted by World Wrestling Council in Puerto Rico since 2007. This event is always celebrated as the first show of the year.

== 2007 ==
Euphoria 2007
- Promotion: World Wrestling Council
- Date: January 6, 2007; January 7, 2007
- City: Bayamon, PR; Fajardo, PR
- Venue: Juan Ramon Loubriel Stadium; Coliseo Tomas Dones

This event was held on Saturday, January 6, 2007 on Juan Ramon Loubriel Stadium at Bayamón, Puerto Rico.

- WWC Universal Champion: Eddie Colón vs Heidenreich
- Carlos Colón vs. Victor Jovica
- Vampiro vs. Huracán Castillo
- Luchador Misterioso vs Bronco
- José Rivera Jr. & Noriega vs Terror Inc.
- Fireblaze vs Alex Montalvo
- Tim Arson vs Rico Suave
- Superstar Romeo vs. Barrabás Jr.
- WWC Junior Lightheavyweight Champion: Hammett vs. Rick Stanley
- Rikochet vs. La Pulga

The second card of the event was celebrated next day, January 7, 2007 at Fajardo, Puerto Rico

- Eddie Colón vs. Bronco
- Vampiro vs. Heidenreich
- Noriega vs. Black Pain
- Fireblaze & Jose Rivera Jr. & Tim Arson vs. Alex Montalvo, Barrabás Jr. & Rico Suave
- Chicky Starr vs. Huracán Castillo
- Hammett vs. Elí Rodríguez
- Génesis vs. La Bella Carmen
- Rikochet vs. La Pulga

== 2008 ==
Euphoria 2008
- Promotion: World Wrestling Council
- Date: January 6, 2008
- City: San Juan, PR
- Venue: Coliseo de Puerto Rico

This event was celebrated at the Coliseo de Puerto Rico José Miguel Agrelot at San Juan, Puerto Rico.

- BJ defeats Barrabas Jr. and Crazy Rudy and Fidel Sierra and Hammett and JDS and Jean and Jessie The Latin Freebird and Jose Rivera Jr. and Mr. X and Romano and Todd Dean, WWC Television Title Battle Royal
- Rico Suave defeats Huracan Castillo
- Joe Bravo defeats Barrabas Jr.
- Octagoncito defeats Mini Abismo Negro, Midgets Match
- The Dynamic Team (Carlos Colon & Jose Rivera) defeat Barrabas & Victor Jovica
- Orlando Colón & Eddie Colón w/ Stacy Colon defeated Konnan & Ron Killings – Guitar Revenge
- Crazy Rudy defeats Black Pain
- Thunder and Lightning (Lightning & Thunder) defeat Juventud Rebelde (Chris Joel & Noriega) (c), WWC Tag Team Title Tables Ladders And Chairs Match
- Carlito Caribbean Cool defeats Chris Masters

== 2009 ==
Euphoria 2009
- Promotion: World Wrestling Council
- Date: January 3, 2009
- City: Bayamón, PR
- Venue: Cancha Pepín Cestero

This event was celebrated on January 3, 2009 in Coliseo Rubén Rodriguez at Bayamón, Puerto Rico.

- Ray González vs El Bronco - No Contest Single Match
- Thunder & Lightning (c) defeat Elijah Burke & Armando Alejandro Estrada WWC Tag Team Title Match
- BJ (c) defeat Steve Corino, WWC Puerto Rico Heavyweight Title Match
- Charles Evans defeats Chicky Starr by DQ, Single Match
- Eugene defeat Snitsky, Single Match
- Huracan Castillo & Rico Suave defeat Bad Boy Bradley & Ricky Reyes, WWC Tag Team Title #1 Contendership Match
- Tommy Diablo defeats Angel, Singles Match
- Ricky Rubio defeats El Profe, Singles Match
- Los Aereos (El Sensacional Carlitos & Hiram Tua) defeat The Sons of Tonga (Kava & Nuku)

== 2010 ==
Euphoria 2010
- Promotion: World Wrestling Council
- Date: January 16, 2010
- City: San Juan, PR
- Venue: Coliseo de Puerto Rico

This event was celebrated on January 16, 2010 in Coliseo de Puerto Rico, Jose M. Agrelot.

- Copa Luchador de la Década: Ray González beat Carlito and Ricky Banderas
- Eddie Colón (Primo) vs Orlando Colón
- WWC Tag Team Champion: La Amenaza Illegal (Bryan & Chicano) vs Thunder & Lightning
- WWC Universal Heavyweight Champion: BJ defeated Noriega
- El Bronco vs Black Pain w/ Chicky Starr (as Manager)
- Shawn Spears vs Idol Stevens
- King Tonga Jr. beat Abbad
- El Sensacional Carlitos pinned Hiram Tua

== 2011 ==
Euphoria 2011
- Promotion: World Wrestling Council
- Date: January 7, 2011; January 8, 2011; January 9, 2011
- City: Juana Diaz, PR; Bayamon, PR; Cabo Rojo, PR
- Venue: Dolores Martinez Coliseum; Jose 'Pepin' Cestero Court; Coliseo Rebekah Colberg Cabrera

This event was celebrated in three dates; January 7, 8, and 9:

The first card was celebrated on January 7, 2011 at Dolores 'Toyita' Martinez Coliseum Juana Diaz.

- Lynx beat Angel
- CJ O'Doyle defeat Hideo Saito
- Killer Kat pinned Black Rose
- BJ & Joe Bravo defeat (DQ) Thunder & Lightning
- Mr Big defeat Noriega
- Rikochet & Mascarita Dorada beat El Niche & Pierrothcito
- Orlando Colon vs El Sensacional Carlitos

The second card was celebrated on January 8, 2011 at Jose 'Pepin' Cestero Court in Bayamón.

- Ricky Banderas vs Carlito w/ Hercules Ayala as Referee
- MVP vs Orlando Colon
- El Sensacional Carlitos vs Hideo Saito
- Joe Bravo vs Mr. X
- BJ vs Noriega
- Thunder & Lightning vs Los Rabiosos (Mr. Big y Blitz)
- Mascarita Dorada vs Pierrothcito
- Chris Joel vs CJ O'Doyle
- Lynx vs El Niche w/Black Rose

The last card was celebrated on January 9, 2011 at Rebekah Colberg in Cabo Rojo.

- El Niche beat Rikochet
- CJ O'Doyle pinned Mr X
- Joe Bravo defeat Hideo Saito
- Los Rabiosos vs Thunder & Lightning (DDQ)
- Pierrothcito beat Mascarita Dorada
- Carlitos defeat Noriega
- MVP & Ricky Banderas defeat Carlito y Orlando Colon

== 2012 ==
Euphoria 2012
- Promotion: World Wrestling Council
- Date: January 6, 2012; January 7, 2012; January 8, 2012
- City: Ponce, PR; Bayamon, PR; Aguadilla, PR
- Venue: Salvador Dijols Coliseum; Ruben Rodriguez Coliseum; Luis T. Diaz Coliseum

The first card was celebrated on January 6, 2012 at Coliseo Salvador Dijols in Ponce.

- AJ Castillo vs Bolo The Red Bulldog
- El Invader vs Chicky Starr
- Huracan Castillo vs Diabolico
- Carlito vs The Precious One Gilbert
- Kenny Dykstra vs El Sensacional Carlitos
- Los Fugitivos de la Calle & Johnny Ringo vs Mr. Big & The Maximo Brothers
- Blue Demon, Jr. vs Chavo Guerrero Jr.

The second card was celebrated on January 7, 2012 at Coliseo Ruben Rodriguez in Bayamón.

- Johnny Ringo vs Diabolico
- Blue Demon Jr. vs Kenny Dykstra
- Los Fugitivos de la Calle vs Maximo Brothers
- Huracan Castillo vs Chicky Starr
- Ray Gonzalez vs The Precious One Gilbert
- El Sensacional Carlitos vs Chavo Guerrero Jr.
- Carlito vs Ricky Banderas

The last card was celebrated on January 8, 2012 at Coliseo Luis T. Diaz in Aguadilla

- Bolo The Red Bulldog vs AJ Castillo
- Mr. Big vs Johnny Ringo
- El Sensacional Carlitos vs Diabolico
- Los Fugitivos de la Calle & Huracan Castillo vs Maximo Brothers & Chicky Starr
- Blue Demon Jr vs The Precious One Gilbert

== 2013 ==
Euphoria 2013
- Promotion: World Wrestling Council
- Date: January 6, 2013
- City: Bayamon, PR
- Venue: Ruben Rodriguez Coliseum

This event was celebrated on January 6, 2013 at Ruben Rodriguez Coliseum in Bayamon, PR

- Huracán Castillo defeat Barrabás Jr. in a Street Fight.
- Sebastián Guerra defeat El Diabólico
- Xix Xavant & AJ Castillo defeat El Coronel y Mr. X
- The Academy Chris Angel defeat Samson Walker
- Gilbert (c) defeat Andy Leavine (with Orlando Toledo) and retain the WWC Puerto Rico Heavyweight Championship.
- Thunder & Lightning (c) (with General Barrabas) defeat Sons of Samoa and retained the WWC World Tag Team Championship
- El Invader defeat Carlito (via DQ)
- Ray González defeated Savio Vega in a Vengeance Match (with Victor Jovica as special guest referee).
- Ricky Banderas defeat Apolo

== 2014 ==
Euphoria 2014
- Promotion: World Wrestling Council
- Date: January 5, 2014
- City: Bayamon, PR
- Venue: Ruben Rodriguez Coliseum

This event was celebrated on January 6, 2014 at Ruben Rodriguez Coliseum in Bayamon, PR

- Syler Andrews defeat Erik Scorpion and win the WWC World Junior Heavyweight Championship
- Mike Mendoza defeat El Diabólico
- Ash defeat AJ Castillo
- TNT defeats the WWC Universal Heavyweight Champion Mighty Ursus (with Juan Manuel Ortega) (via DQ)
- Chicano & Xix Xavant defeat Sons of Samoa and win the WWC World Tag Team Championship
- Los Matadores defeat Thunder & Lightning
- Carlito & El Invader defeat Ray Gonzalez & Ricky Santana
- The match between Gilbert and WWC Puerto Rican Heavyweight Champion El León Apolo ended in a draw due to a 30-minute time limit.

== 2015 ==
Euphoria 2015
- Promotion: World Wrestling Council
- Date: January 3, 2015
- City: Bayamon, PR
- Venue: Cancha José Pepín Cestero de Bayamón

This event was celebrated on January 3, 2015 at Ruben Rodriguez Coliseum in Bayamon, PR

- Xix Xavant and Chicky Starr defeated los Templarios
- Mike Mendoza defeated El Diabolico in a First Blood Match
- Samiel Adams defeated Tommy Diablo after the intervention of the revolution
- Black Rose defeated La Tigresa with Stacy Colón as special referee
- Chicano retained the Puerto Rico Heavyweight Championship against El Bronco
- Miguel Pérez and Hurricane Castillo retained the WWC Tag Team titles against The Sons of Samoa
- Ray Gonzalez defeated Jinder Mahal in an Indian Strap Match
- Carlito retained the Universal Championship against The Mighty Ursus in a match with the ring surrounded by fire

A retirement ceremony was held for Invader I on that night. Wrestlers surrounded the ring. Chicky Starr, Carlos Colon, Ray Gonzalez and Carlito among those who talked about the Invader wrestling career. He endorsed Mike Mendoza as a future star and gave thanks to the fans.

== 2016 ==
Euphoria 2016
- Promotion: World Wrestling Council
- Date: January 9, 2016
- City: Bayamon, PR
- Venue: Ruben Rodriguez Coliseum

- El Hijo de Ray González defeated Scotty Santiago
- Black Pain defeated Mighty Ursus, Chain Match
- Ray Gonzalez beat El Hijo de Dos Caras Street Fight
- El Cuervo & Mike Mendoza defeat Angel Fashion & La Revolucion II (w/Vanilla Vargas)
- Tommy Diablo defeats Peter The Bad Romance (c), WWC Junior Heavyweight Title Match
- La Revolucion (La Revolucion I & La Revolucion III) (w/Orlando Toledo) (c) defeat The Sons Of Samoa (Afa Jr. & LA Smooth) and Thunder And Lightning (Lightning & Thunder), WWC Tag Team Title Three Way Match
- Carlito defeats Chicano, WWC Universal Heavyweight Title #1 Contendership Match
- Mr. 450 Hammett retained the Universal Championship against Carlito in a TLC match

== 2017 ==
Euphoria 2017
- Promotion: World Wrestling Council
- Date: January 7, 2017 January 8, 2017
- City: Bayamon, PR Mayaguez, PR
- Venue: Ruben Rodriguez Coliseum The Palacio de Recreación y Deportes German Wilkins Vélez Ramírez

This event was celebrated on January 7, 2017 at Ruben Rodriguez Coliseum in Bayamon, PR and at The Palacio de Recreación y Deportes German Wilkins Vélez Ramírez

- Tommy Diablo (c) beat Angel Cotto WWC Junior Heavyweight Title Match
- Apolo (w/Habana) beat The Mighty Ursus Singles Match
- Mike Mendoza beat Chicano (c), Angel, Angel Fashion, El Cuervo, El Diabolico, Peter The Bad Romance and Ray Gonzalez Jr WWC Puerto Rican Title Eight Man Battle Royal
- Thunder & Lightning (c) beat La Revolucion (La Revolucion I & La Revolucion II) WWC Tag Team Title Match
- El Cuervo beat El Hijo de Dos Caras Singles Match
- Ray Gonzalez beat MVP Singles Match
- Alberto El Patron vs. Carlito – No Contest WWC Universal Title Match (vacant)

== 2018 ==
After Hurricane Maria hit Puerto Rico, WWC shutdown for a couple of months. For this reason the 2018 event wasn't celebrated.

== 2019 ==
Euphoria 2019
- Promotion: World Wrestling Council
- Date: January 5, 2019
- City: Guaynabo, PR
- Venue: Coliseo Mario Morales

The event was held in Guaynabo, Puerto Rico

- Bellito defeats Diabolico (c), WWC Television Title Match
- La Revolucion & Pelayito Vazquez defeat Las Torres Del Sindicato & El Wizard, Six Man Tag Team Match
- El Torito defeats Demus, Midgets Match
- Gilbert defeats Epico Colon, WWC Universal Heavyweight Title #1 Contendership Match
- Pedro Portillo III defeats Chicano (c), WWC Puerto Rico Heavyweight Title Match
- Carlito defeats El Comandante, Singles Match
- Lightning & Thunder (c) defeat Doom Patrol (Cold & Death Warrant), WWC Tag Team Title Match
- Xix Xavant (c) defeats Primo Colon, WWC Universal Heavyweight Title Match

== 2020 ==
Euphoria 2020
- Promotion: World Wrestling Council
- Date: January 4, 2020
- City: Bayamon, PR
- Venue: Ruben Rodriguez Coliseum

This event was celebrated on January 4, 2020 at Ruben Rodriguez Coliseum in Bayamon, PR

- Orlando Colón(C) retains the Universal Championship over Texano Jr.
- Ricky Banderas defeats Eddie Colón.
- Gilbert defeats Carlito.
- Mighty Ursus(C) retains the WWC Puerto Rico Championship over Bellito.
- Khaos & Abaddon(C) retain the Tag Team Championship over La Revolución.
- Royal Rumble. The winner gets to challenge any champion during 2020. Winner Xix Xavant.
- La Potencia defeats Doom Patrol.
- Ray González hosted a live edition of El Café del Milenio with Special Guest Peter John Ramos.

== 2023 ==
Euphoria 2023
- Promotion: World Wrestling Council
- Date: January 8, 2023
- City: Bayamon, PR
- Venue: Ruben Rodriguez Coliseum

This event was celebrated on January 8, 2023 at Ruben Rodriguez Coliseum in Bayamon, PR

- Mighty Ursus defeats Super Gladiador, WWC Puerto Rico Heavyweight Title #1 Contendership Match
- Vanilla Vargas defeats Yaide
- La Revolucion defeat La Seguridad Hardcore Tag Team Match
- Mike Nice defeats Nihan (c) - TITLE CHANGE WWC Puerto Rico Heavyweight Title Match
- Eddie Colon defeats Gilbert
- Intelecto 5 Estrellas (c) defeats Fandango, WWC Universal Heavyweight Title Match
- Carlito defeats John Morrison
- Ray Gonzalez defeats Xavant, Hair Vs. WWC Management Match

== 2024 ==
Euphoria 2024
- Promotion: World Wrestling Council
- Date: January 20, 2024
- City: Bayamon, PR
- Venue: Cancha Pepín Cestero

This event was celebrated on January 20, 2024 at Cancha Pepín Cestero in Bayamon, PR

- Steve Maclin defeated Makabro
- El Informante defeated El Hijo del Enigma, Brandon The Skater and Diego Luna (c), Fatal Four Way Match For The WWC Junior Heavyweight Championship
- Amazona defeated Natalia Markova
- Bryan Idol defeated Jovan (c), WWC Television Championship Match
- Nihan defeated Mike Nice
- Gilbert (c) defeated Ryan Nemeth, WWC Puerto Rico Championship Match
- Xavant (c) defeated Matt Cardona, WWC Caribbean Championship Match
- Chris Adonis defeated Intelecto 5 Estrellas (c), WWC Universal Heavyweight Championship Match with Special Guest Referee: Eddie Colon
- Ray Gonzalez defeated Nic Nemeth via disqualification
- La Maldita Revolucion (Zcion RT1 & Julio Jimenez) defeated La Artilleria Ilegal (Lightning & Chicano) (c), Tables, Ladders & Stairs Match For The WWC Tag Team Championship

== 2025 ==
Euphoria 2025
- Promotion: World Wrestling Council
- Date: January 11, 2025
- City: Bayamon, PR
- Venue: Cancha Pepín Cestero

This event was celebrated on January 11, 2025 at Cancha Pepín Cestero in Bayamon, PR

- Pablo Marquez defeats El Informante #2
- Amazona (c) defeats Stephanie Amalbert, WWC Women's Title Match (Special Referee: Elena Negroni)
- JC Jexxx defeats El Informante (c), WWC Junior Heavyweight Title Match
- Joe Anthony defeats El Hijo de Dos Caras
- Alberto El Patron (c) defeats Octagon Jr., AAA Mega Title Match
- La Maldita Revolucion (Julio Jimenez & Zcion RT1) defeat La Artilleria Ilegal (Chicano & Lightning)
- Zcion RT1 defeats Mike Nice, WWC Universal Heavyweight Title #1 Contendership Match
- Mr. Big (c) defeats Gilbert, WWC Caribbean Title Match
- Intelecto 5 Estrellas defeats Ray Gonzalez (c), WWC Universal Heavyweight Title Vs. Mask Match

== 2026 ==
Euphoria 2026
- Promotion: World Wrestling Council
- Date: January 24, 2026
- City: Bayamon, PR
- Venue: Cancha Pepín Cestero

This event was celebrated on January 24, 2026 at Cancha Pepín Cestero in Bayamon, PR

- Los Matadores Celestiales (Mike Nice & Oscar Benabe) (c) defeat Los Inmortales (Orly Jr. & Tapia) WWC Tag Team Title Match
- Jovan (c) defeats JC Jexxx, WWC Junior Heavyweight Title Match
- Makabro defeats Amaddeo Sole (c) by Count Out, WWC Television Title Match
- Tony Leyenda defeats Lightning (c) and El Hijo de Dos Caras, WWC Caribbean Title Three Way Match
- Elena Negroni (c) defeats Amazona and Stephanie Amalbert and Kamila, WWC Women's Title Four Way Hardcore Match (Special Referees: El Informante & Joe Anthony)
- Zcion RT1 defeats Intelecto 5 Estrellas, Singles Match
- Alberto del Rio defeats Gilbert
- Andrade (w/Alberto del Rio) (c) defeats Xavant, WWC Universal Heavyweight Title Match
- Ray Gonzalez defeats Carlito (w/Eddie Colon) in a 16% of the actions vs. Eddie Colón’s hair.
- John Hawking defeats Chicano, Singles Match

== See also ==
- Professional wrestling in Puerto Rico
- List of professional wrestling promotions
