= Angel Fashion =

Puerto Rican wrestler (born 1987)

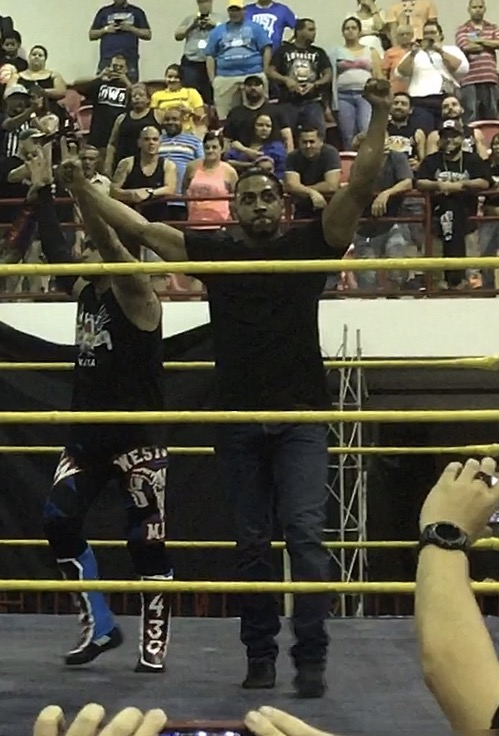
- Pérez in May 2017

Personal information
- Born: Angel L.Perez Roman; December 14, 1987 (age 38) Humacao, Puerto Rico

Professional wrestling career
- Ring name(s): La Moda; Angel Fashion; Angel Pérez
- Billed height: 6 ft 0 in (1.83 m)
- Billed weight: 200 lb (91 kg)
- Billed from: Orlando, Florida
- Trained by: Shane Sewell; Armando Gorbea; Savio Vega
- Debut: 2005

Angel L. Pérez Roman (born December 14, 1987) is a Puerto Rican professional wrestler. Angel Pérez was born in Humacao, Puerto Rico and currently resides in Orlando, Florida. As a professional wrestler, he performs under the name Angel Fashion and describes himself as "el hombre que está de Moda" (The man who is fashionable). After beginning his career in the World Wrestling Council (WWC), Angel Fashion currently wrestles for World Wrestling League. where he is in his first reign as WWL World Heavyweight Champion and across the United States with several independent promotions.

== Professional wrestling career ==
=== World Wrestling Council (2005–2017) ===
==== As a referee ====
Angel Pérez trained with Shane Sewell (Shane "The Glamour Boy) between 2003 and 2004. Because at that time his physique was not sufficiently developed he began as a professional referee in 2005 and remained in that function until the year 2014. During this time Angel continued to train and worked on building his body until the promotion felt he was now ready to compete as a professional wrestler. His transition from referee to wrestler got fueled when he acted as the referee in a feud between Savio Vega and Ray González, where he favored Savio. Being at a disadvantage, Ray González recruited referee Pelayito Vázquez to level things. This brought on a feud between Angel and Pelayo which transcended into a match between them at WWC Aniversario 2014.

==== Wrestling career ====
Angel's first official feud was against Rikochet. Angel later formed a tag team with Tommy Diablo, which at the time held WWC's world-wrestling-council-wwc. WWC World Junior Heavyweight Championship. Wanting a shot for this title, Angel turned on Tommy and challenged him for the title, which he won on May 10, 2014, in Bayamón, Puerto Rico. Angel lost the title to Mike Mendoza on June 21, 2014, but recovered it one week later. He then lost it to Tommy Diablo on August 9, 2014, and recovered it on September 6, 2014. Angel won the WWC Puerto Rico Heavyweight Championship from Miguel Pérez, Jr. on January 23, 2016. He lost it to El Sensacional Carlitos on March 19, 2016, but recovered it one week later. He then lost it on May 28, 2016, to El Chicano. Some of Angel's most notable feuds have been against Tommy Diablo, Rikochet, Mike Mendoza and Ray González Jr., among many others. On the 2016 event "Camino A La Gloria, Angel Fashion caused Chicano to lose to Gilbert. At the 2016 event Summer Madness Angel Fashion was involved in a 3-way match against Mr. 450 and Sensacional Carlitos. The winner of the match would be able to challenge any champion for any title, MR. 450 won. On WWC's event Lockout, which took place on December 3, 2016, Angel Fashion defeated TNA's Robbie E. Angel is usually accompanied to the ring by his valet Vanilla Vargas. Vanilla occasionally wrestles in Mexico for CMLL under the name Lady Boricua In April 2017 he left WWC.

=== World Wrestling League (since 2017) ===
On May 13, 2017, Pérez made his debut in the World Wrestling League (WWL) accompanied by another former WWC wrestler Mike Mendoza. The duo confronted the stable La Junta de Control (lit. "The Control Board", in reference to PROMESA), led by Konnan. Together, Pérez and Mendoza formed a team known as La Tercera Generación and allied with the stable Westside Mafia (with Mr. 450 serving as unofficial leader) to oppose the invaders. Both debutants were unable to attend the promotion's next card due to pre-existing arrangements to participate in Cleveland Knights Championship Wrestling's (CKCW) Vanished Empire event. During their absence, a parallel angle was run where Manny Ferno (COO of La Junta) attacked Mendoza's brother. On June 24, 2017, Pérez made his in-ring debut for WWL, securing a victory against David Montes, a member of the Puro Macho security entourage.

Growing increasingly frustrated, Ferno requested the intervention of one of Konnan's stables, Impact Wrestling's Latin American Exchange. La Tercera Generación defeated the unified Global Force Wrestling/Impact Wrestling World Tag Team Champions Ángel Ortiz and Mike Draztic in the first confrontation between groups. On July 15, 2017, 450 defeated Joseph Cruz "J.C." Navarro in a first contenders match stole the WWL World Heavyweight Championship belt and rebranded himself as the Mecha Wolf 450, in the process turning on the faces.

=== World Wrestling Entertainment (2018) ===
In December 2018 Angel Fashion represented Puerto Rico along with Vanilla Vargas, in the first Latin American WWE tryouts. These tryouts were held for 3 days in Chile. Among the participants were professional wrestlers Ricky Marvin, Zatara and Ariel levy, also football players Octavio González y Edgar Ceballos.

=== International Independent Circuit ===
==== Amaro Productions ====
On June 12, 2016, Angel Fashion challenged the Gallo heavyweight Champion Georgie Murphy at Chicago. The match ended in a disqualification. On August 13, 2016, Angel Fashion teamed with Carlito Caribbean Cool at New York, to defeat Danny Demanto and Matt Striker. Angel Fashion has also been active in other Amaro cards by himself and as part of a Puerto Rico vs. Mexico feud. Angel's team included Savio Vega, Miguel Pérez Jr., BJ, Sensacional Carlitos and Hernandez. Mexico's team included Blue Demon Jr., Aero Boy, Medico Asesino, Extreme Tiger and Juventud Guerrera.

==== CKCW (Cleveland Knights Championship Wrestling) ====
On February 11, 2016, in Ohio, Angel Fashion was part of a 4-way match for the CKCW Championship against BJ, Sensacional Carlitos and Apolo at the event Chase For The Grail. Angel managed to eliminate BJ and Carlitos from the match but was eliminated by Apolo. On June 3, 2017, Angel Fashion participated in a triple threat match to crown the CKCW World Heavyweight Champion along El Sensacional Carlitos and J. Rocc, which saw the latter emerge victorious. In July, Pérez teamed with Mendoza in a loss to the team known as Stateline.

On February 9, 2018, Fashion earned a shot at the CKCW World Heavyweight Championship by winning New World Rising's "Chase for the Case" six-man ladder match with the help of El Nazareno. At CKCW, the remaining two members of Tercera Generación became part of The Holy Fashion. The group began a list of "Hall of #Blessed" wrestlers, which compiled those laid out by the group. "Sensacional" Roger Díaz and Justin Dynamite (Jomar Merced) were its inaugural members. On May 20, 2018, Mendoza and Fashion (now rebranded as La Marea) defeated Thunder and Lightning to win the CKCW Tag Team Championship.

=== Pro Wrestling 2.0 ===
On January 10, 2018, Pérez faced Mecha Wolf 450 for the first time since his betrayal at WWL, with the match ending with the interference of former Westside Mafia leader El Nazareno and Carlos Cupeles on his behalf. Following the attack, they reintroduced themselves as a new stable named The Holy Fashion. After weeks of stalking 450, Fashion faced him on February 13, 2018, where he, Nazareno and Cupeles made him the "latest inductee" into the Hall of #Blessed by jumping him.

In the tournament to crown the first PW 2.0 World Heavyweight Champion, Holy Fashion attacked 450 again, allowing Fashion to advance to the final against Tony Storm.

=== All Elite Wrestling ===
In 2020, Angel Fashion made his AEW debut on the September 4th edition of AEW Dark, teaming with Ryzin in a match against the Lucha Brothers. He would later resurface on the October 13th edition of AEW Dark, where he would team up with Aaron Solow and M'Badu against Alex Reynolds, John Silver, and Preston Vance of the Dark Order in a 6-man tag.

== Championships and accomplishments ==
- Cleveland Knights Championship Wrestling
  - Immortal lucha libre World Heavyweight Championship (1 time, current)
  - CKCW Tag Team Championship (1 time, current) - with Mike Mendoza
- Pro Wrestling 2.0
  - PW 2.0 Heavyweight Championship (5 times)
  - PW 2.0 Universal Cruiserweight Championship (1 time)
  - PW 2.0 Tag team Championship (2 times, current)
- New Generation Championship Wrestling
  - NGCW World Championship (current)
- World Wrestling Council
  - WWC Puerto Rico Championship (2 times)
  - WWC Junior Heavyweight Championship (4 times)
- World Wrestling League
  - WWL World Heavyweight Championship (1 time)
- Lionheart Wrestling Association
  - LWA World Heavyweight Championship (1 time, current)
