= IWA Television Championship =

Retired Puerto Rican wrestling championship

IWA World Television Championship
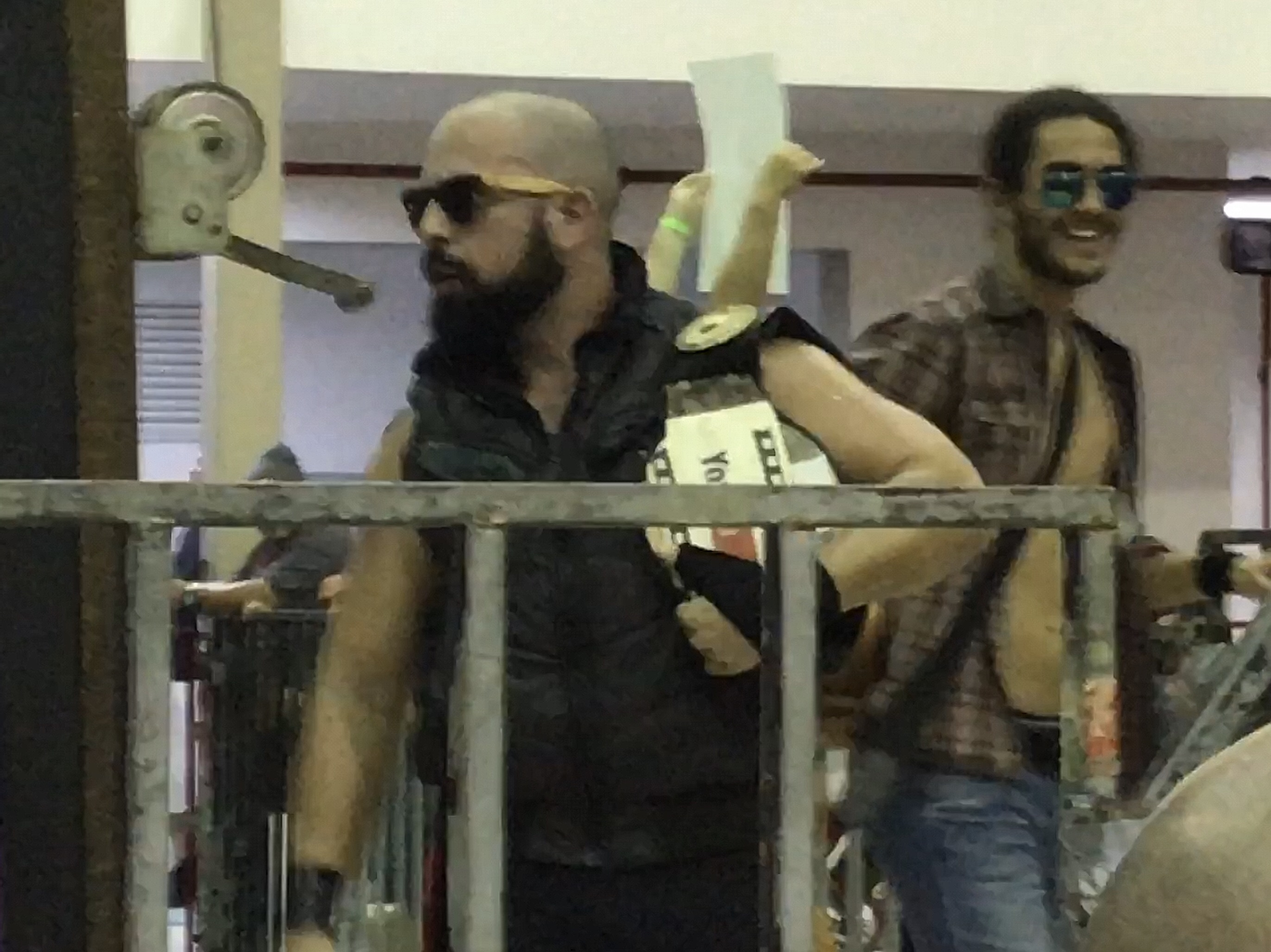
- Sr. C with the decommissioned belt in 2017.

Details
- Promotion: International Wrestling Association
- Date established: 2006
- Date retired: 2012 (continued to be used as an unsanctioned championship in WWL)

Other names
- IWA Extreme Cruiserweight Championship; IWA Extreme Combat Division Championship; IWA Cruiserweight Championship; IWA Television Championship; IWA Yoú Tu Championship; WWL Yoú Tu Championship
Statistics
- Most reigns: Lash (3 reigns)
- Longest reign: Lash (182 days)
- Shortest reign: Noel Rodríguez (Less on 1 day)

The IWA Television Championship, previously known as the IWA Extreme Cruiserweight Championship, was a title defended in the International Wrestling Association (IWA) in Puerto Rico.

== History ==
The championship was created as the IWA Extreme Cruiserweight Championship in 2006 and was intended to be a replacement for the IWA World Junior Heavyweight Championship; it was introduced on November 25, 2006 by IWA General Manager Orlando Toledo. The title was later renamed to the IWA Extreme Combat Division Championship in 2009, the IWA Cruiserweight Championship in April 2011, the IWA Television Championship on June 4, 2011, and lastly to the IWA Yoú Tu Championship in January 2012. The championship was retired in June 2012 when IWA closed. In 2017, the physical belt was used by the World Wrestling League (WWL) as the WWL Yoú Tu Championship; though the belt appeared on WWL events, it was never defended.

== Title history ==
=== Name History ===
Names	Dates
IWA Extreme Cruiserweight Championship	December 9, 2006 - October 4, 2008
IWA Extreme Combat Division Championship	July 18, 2009 - March 5, 2011
IWA Cruiserweight Championship	April 2, 2011 - June 4, 2011
IWA Television Championship	June 4, 2011 - June 2012
IWA Yoú Tu Championship	January 2012 - June 2012
WWL Yoú Tu Championship	January 24, 2017 - c. September 2017

#	Wrestler:	Times:	Date:	Place:	Event:	Notes:	Ref.
	IWA Extreme Cruiserweight Championship						
1	Blitz	1	December 9, 2006	Bayamón, Puerto Rico	Christmas in PR (2006)	Defeated Amazona to win the title in a tournament final.	
2	Tommy Diablo	1	March 4, 2007	Guanica, Puerto Rico	IWA TV Taping		
3	"El Lucha" Phoenix Star	1	May 19, 2007	Carolina, Puerto Rico	Juicio Final (2007)		
4	El Sensacional Carlitos	1	June 16, 2007	Bayamón, Puerto Rico	II Copa José Miguel Pérez		
5	Hiram Tua	1	October 13, 2007	Bayamón, Puerto Rico	Hardcore Weekend (2007)		
—	Vacated	—	April 5, 2008	Toa Baja, Puerto Rico			
6	El Niche	1	May 17, 2008	Bayamón, Puerto Rico	Juicio Final VIII	Defeated Erik Escorpion in tournament final.	
7	Death Warrant	1	July 19, 2008	Bayamón, Puerto Rico	Summer Attitude (2008)		
8	Onix	1	August 16, 2008	Bayamón, Puerto Rico	Road to Armageddon		
9	Noel Rodríguez	1	October 4, 2008	Bayamón, Puerto Rico	Golpe de Estado (2008)	Defeated Giant Manson, Hardam Kadafi, El Niche, Onix, Rain Stain, Rick Stanley, Spectro and Zaer Arafat in a 9-way elimination match for the IWA Hardcore, Extreme Cruiserweight and Puerto Rico Heavyweight titles.	
—	Unified	—	October 4, 2008	Bayamón, Puerto Rico	Golpe de Estado (2008)	Title unified with IWA Hardcore and Puerto Rico Heavyweight titles respectively, later in the same date the title was retired.	
	IWA Extreme Combat Division Championship						
10	Cuervo	1	July 18, 2009	Bayamón, Puerto Rico	IWA 10th Anniversary	Defeated Cold, Empio, Mike Piconose, Psycho and Vértigo in a 6-way X match to become the first IWA Extreme Combat Division Champion.	
11	Vertigo	1	October 10, 2009	Bayamón, Puerto Rico	IWA TV Taping		
12	Cuervo	2	October 31, 2009	Yauco, Puerto Rico	Halloween Mayhem (2009)		
—	Vacated	—	December 13, 2009	—		When Cuervo jumped to WWC.	
13	Empio	1	January 6, 2010	Bayamón, Puerto Rico	Histeria Boricua (2010)	Won a 7-man battle royal for the vacant title.	
14	Lash	1	January 30, 2010	Levittown, Puerto Rico	IWA TV Taping		
15	Átomo	1	February 27, 2010	Las Marías, Puerto Rico	IWA TV Taping		
16	Starky	1	March 13, 2010	Cayey, Puerto Rico	Noche de Campeones (2010)	After Átomo defeated Empio and Lash in 3-way match to retain the title, Starky Challenged Átomo to be the new Extreme Combat Division Champion.	
17	Julian Jamrock	1	May 1, 2010	Toa Alta, Puerto Rico	1ra Ronda Copa Alcalde		
18	Lash	2	June 6, 2010	Yabucoa, Puerto Rico	IWA TV Taping		
19	Havoc	1	October 16, 2010	Bayamón, Puerto Rico	Hardcore Weekend (2010)	Defeated Lash in a No DQ match.	
—	Vacated	—	March 5, 2011	Manatí, Puerto Rico	—	When Havoc is injured.	
	IWA Cruiserweight Championship						
20	Havoc	2	April 2, 2011	Toa Baja, Puerto Rico	Juicio Final (2011)	Defeated Lash, Enigma and Sónico in a 4-way X match.	
21	Riddix	1	April 30, 2011	Bayamón, Puerto Rico	Clash of the Titans (2011)	Defeated Havoc, Lash and Psycho in a 4-way match.	
	IWA Television Championship						
22	Enigma	1	June 4, 2011	Orocovis, Puerto Rico	Guerra en la Montaña	Change explained in-story as a result of the incumbent outgrowing the cruiserweight division.	
23	Lash	3	July 30, 2011	Bayamón, Puerto Rico	Summer Attitude (2011)		
24	Sr. C	1	January 28, 2012	Toa Alta, Puerto Rico	Histeria Boricua (2012)	Defeated Enigma in a 4-way one night tournament. Some days later Sr. C renamed the title "IWA Yoú Tu Championship" (a reference to YouTube, since the promotion was no longer airing its shows on television).	
—	Inactive	—	June 16, 2012	—	—	Title was deactivated when IWA closed. The belt (in its Yoú Tu Championship version) reappeared in the World Wrestling League (WWL) during the spring of 2017 being carried by Sr. C. The "IWA" acronym was later covered. It was not defended during these appearances.	

== Combined reigns ==
Rank	Wrestler	No. of reigns	Combined days
1	Lash	3	397
2	Hiram Tua	1	175
3	Havoc	2	168
4	Sr. C	1	140
5	Cuervo	2	127
6	Carlitos	1	119
7	Blitz	1	85
8	Tommy Diablo	1	76
9	El Niche	1	63
10	Enigma	1	56
11	Starky	1	50
12	Onix	1	49
13	Riddix	1	35
14	Julian Jamrock	1	34
15	"El Lucha" Phoenix Star	1	28
15	Death Warrant	1	28
16	Empio	1	24
17	Vértigo	1	21
18	Átomo	1	14
19	Noel Rodríguez	1	<1
