= WWL World Heavyweight Championship =

- One-time champion, Mr. Big.

Details
- Promotion: World Wrestling League
- Date established: April 21, 2013
- Current champion: Vacant
- Date won: July 2, 2020
Statistics
- First champion: Monster Pain
- Most reigns: Mike Mendoza (2 reigns)
- Longest reign: Monster Pain (545 days)
- Shortest reign: Mike Mendoza (<1 day)
- Oldest champion: Shane Sewell (42 years)
- Youngest champion: Mike Mendoza (28 years)
- Heaviest champion: Monster Pain (389 lb (176 kg))
- Lightest champion: Angel Fashion (182 lbs) (83 kg)

The WWL World Heavyweight Championship (Campeonato Mundial Peso Completo de la WWL in Spanish) was a professional wrestling world heavyweight championship promoted by the World Wrestling League (WWL) promotion in Puerto Rico. The first champion was crowned on April 21, 2013, when Monster Pain won a battle royal for the title.

The championship was generally contested in professional wrestling matches, in which participants execute scripted finishes rather than contend in direct competition.

== History ==
=== Inaugural champion; international defenses ===
The original title belt was a variant of the Big Gold Belt, since then-president Richard Negrín was a fan of the design. On April 21, 2013, at the inaugural event of the WWL, José Torres, working as Monster Pain, defeated Bobby Lashley to win a battle royal and become the inaugural World Heavyweight Champion. The title soon received its first international exposition by being featured, but not defended, in a match where he teamed with Matt Morgan and Jeff Jarrett in a win over the Trios Champions Los Psycho Circus as part of Asistencia Asesoría y Administración's (AAA) Triplemanía XXI event.

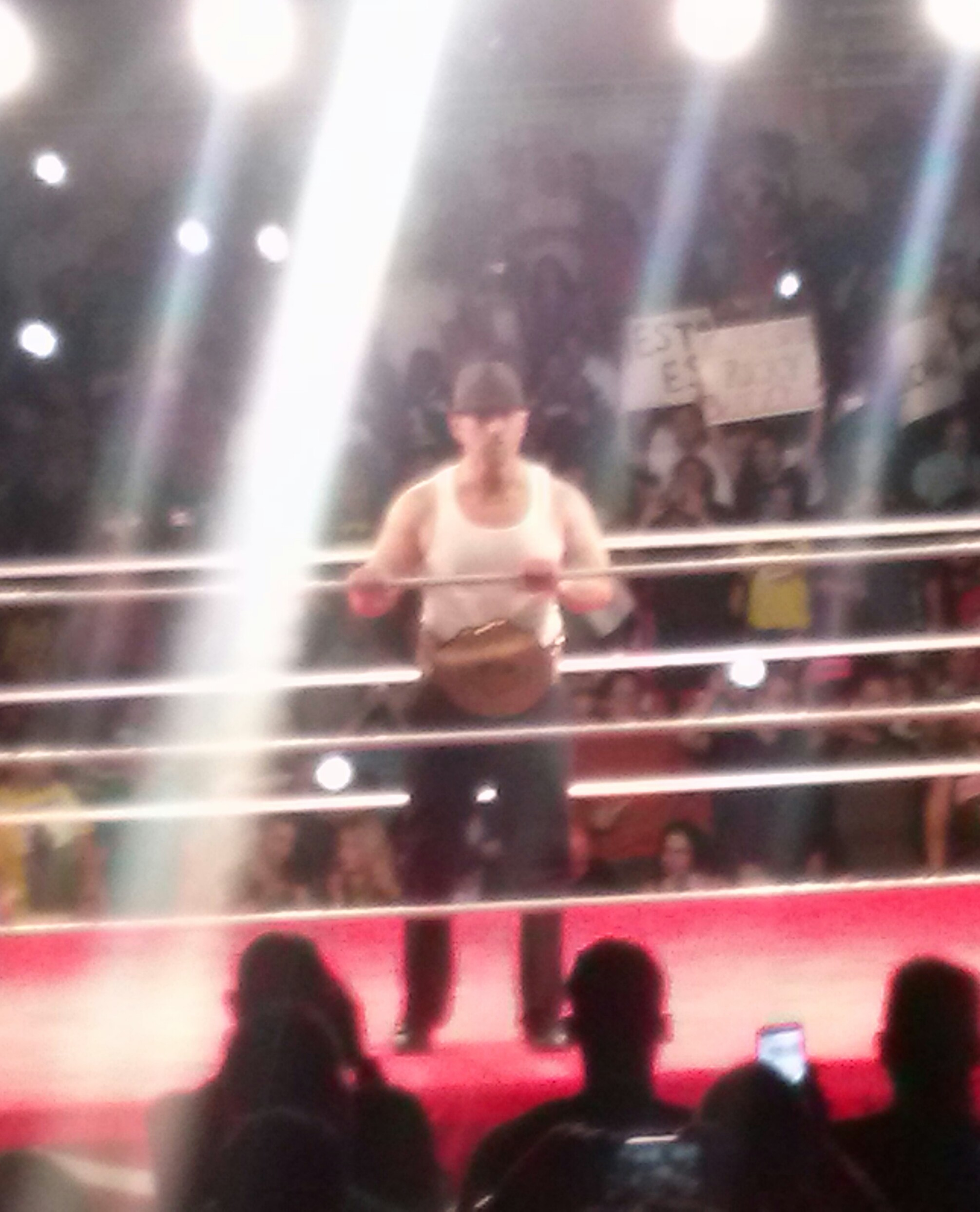
Shane Sewell with the original belt.

On September 6, 2013, Torres defended the WWL World Heavyweight Championship, retaining after losing a countout to John Morrison in Saltillo. Two days later at Monterrey, he retained by disqualification in a rematch, winning when Morrison removed his mask. On March 7, 2014, he retained the title by wrestling Mil Máscaras to a no contest at Veracruz. Two days later, Torres defeated Carly Colón and Chavo Guerrero in Mexico City to remain champion. On October 18, 2014, at the show that marked the return to the Puerto Rican home base known as Insurrection, Pain lost the title against Shane Sewell. The Canadian served as transitional champion, eventually losing to Alberto El Patrón (José Alberto Rodríguez). A controversial finish was used to justify stripping him of the title. Negrín later revealed that Rodríguez had created a creative hindrance by refusing to lose or film promos throughout his run.

=== Reintroduction ===
On March 23, 2015, the promotion entered a hiatus without crowning a champion, and when it returned the original belt was replaced with a new diamond-shaped design, also marking a new approach that focuses on hosting cards at Puerto Rico instead of touring. Hiram Tua (Hiram Mulero) won the vacant title and defended it throughout a change in administration that saw Savio Vega (Juan Rivera) purchase the promotion from Negrín. Tua dropped the title to Superstar Ash (Peter Concepción) at Christmas in PR, the promotion's 2016 season closer. However, the relationship between Rivera and Negrín deteriorated and the latter began sponsoring a small independent named Caribbean Wrestling School (CWS). At Evolución, Superstar Ash stated during a promo that he was retiring and vacating the title due to nagging leg injuries, but appeared in the former president's promotion that same night.

The promotion responded by giving the title to Mr. Big (Miguel Maldonado), a then midcard veteran who was amidst a major angle where he was forced to become disciplined in order to return to the mainevent after almost a decade. He was booked as a rebellious and dominant champion for the following months, retaining the title with relative ease and only responding to Vega. Parallel to his feuds was an angle where his former tag team partner Blitz (Freddy Lozada) tried to convince Big that he was on the wrong side, only to be attacked. After La Junta de Control a stable led by Konnan (Charles Ashenoff) was introduced as the new power and storyline owner of WWL, firing Vega in the process, the group actively pursued replacing him with a corporative champion, bringing talent from abroad (mostly from Konnan's The CRASH).

Blitz managed to be named the special referee of Big's first defense under the new regime and aided him retain over Mr. 450 (John Jesús Yurnet) and Willie Mack. After the tag team reformed as Los Rabiosos, general manager Miguel Pérez Jr. was tasked with dethroning him by any means necessary. Mr. 450 was the first to get a titular rematch, but the contest ended in a double disqualification due to outside interference. A returning Concepción, now known as El Nazareno, also failed to win the title after refusing to cheat despite Pérez giving him carte blanche to do so.

=== Mr. 450's international tour ===
On July 15, 2017, Mr. 450 defeated Joseph Cruz "J.C." Navarro in a first contenders match and stole the WWL World Heavyweight Championship belt, bringing it on board an airplane. Afterwards, the self-proclaimed champion would carry the title in his foreign presentations, beginning the following day when he headlined in a trios match at the Arena Nacionalista in Mexicali. This was followed by an appearance in Wrestling Superstar's (WS) Lucha Conquest event, held at Orlando, Florida. On August 5, 2017, Big was given the original belt to replace the stolen one and defended it in a three-way against the latest contenders that ended without a winner, after which Mr. 450 (now known as The Mecha Wolf 450) took that one as well and self-proclaimed himself the "Undisputed World Heavyweight Champion".

Although the promotion entered a forced hiatus after hurricane Maria passed over Puerto Rico in September 2017, 450 retained the unofficial WWL World Heavyweight Championship by defeating Skalibur on October 29, this as part of the 28th Anniversary of the Arena Nacionalista in Mexicali. On March 24, 2018, 450 made an appearance with the second model of the title (WWL was still preparing to inaugurate its 2018 season the following month) while challenging Star Roger for Champion Wrestling Association's (a large independent company, which occupies the third place among Puerto Rican promotions) World Heavyweight Championship. Mr. Big also made an unannounced appearance, attacking both and reclaiming the belt. Despite this, 450 retained control of the original title (which was phased out of the storyline).

After defeating Mr. Big at Juicio Final to formally become champion, more defenses abroad followed. On June 23, 2018, Mecha Wolf retained over Jake St. Patrick in a Coastal Championship Wrestling (CCW) card held at Coral Springs, Florida.

== Title history ==
#	Wrestlers	Reign	Date	Days held	Location	Event	Notes	Ref
1	Monster Pain	1	April 21, 2013	545	Hato Rey, San Juan, Puerto Rico	Idols of Wrestling	Monster Pain defeated Bobby Lashley in the final of a twenty-five man battle royal to become the inaugural champion.	
2	Shane Sewell	1	October 18, 2014	80	Bayamón, Puerto Rico	Insurrection		
3	Alberto El Patrón	1	January 6, 2015	256	San Juan, Puerto Rico	Guerra de Reyes	This was a three-way match, also featuring "El Mesias" Ricky Banderas.	
–	Vacated	–	September 19, 2015	–	Bayamón, Puerto Rico	WrestleFest	After a controversy during a title match.	
4	Hiram Tua	1	July 16, 2016	120	Canovanas, Puerto Rico	WWL High Voltage #17 – Third Season	Defeated Rikochet, David "Big Daddy" Montes, and Manny Ferno in a four-way match. This episode aired on tape delay on July 28, 2016.	
5	Superstar Ash	1	November 13, 2016	62	Cataño, Puerto Rico	WWL High Voltage Live!	Defeated Hiram Tua, Spectro and Vassago in four-way match. This episode aired on Youtube on November 18, 2016.	
–	Vacated	–	January 14, 2017	14	Cataño, Puerto Rico	WWL High Voltage Live! Evolucion	Vacated the title to retire from Lucha Libre but some hours later appeared at CWS a rival promotion. It aired on Youtube on January 26, 2017.	
6	Mr. Big	1	January 28, 2017	447	Cataño, Puerto Rico	WWL High Voltage Live!	Defeated Manny Ferno, Vassago and Payatronic in a four-way no disqualification match with Savio Vega as special referee. It aired on Youtube on February 25, 2017.	
7	Mecha Wolf	1	April 20, 2018	190	Dorado, Puerto Rico	Juicio Final		
–	Vacated	–	October 27, 2018	–	Villalba, Puerto Rico	WWL High Voltage Live!	Mecha Wolf was stripped of the title after missing a scheduled flight	
8	BJ	1	October 27, 2018	231	Villalba, Puerto Rico	WWL High Voltage Live!	Defeated Angel Fashion	
9	Mike Mendoza	1	June 15, 2019	119	Dorado, Puerto Rico	Destino Final		
10	Angel Fashion	1	October 12, 2019	120	Caguas, Puerto Rico	Insurrection		
11	Mike Mendoza	2	February 9, 2020	0	San Juan, Puerto Rico	The End		
12	Star Roger	1	February 9, 2020	144	San Juan, Puerto Rico	The End		
–	Vacated	–	July 2, 2020	–			When WWL Closes.	
