= WWC Puerto Rico Championship =

Professional wrestling championship

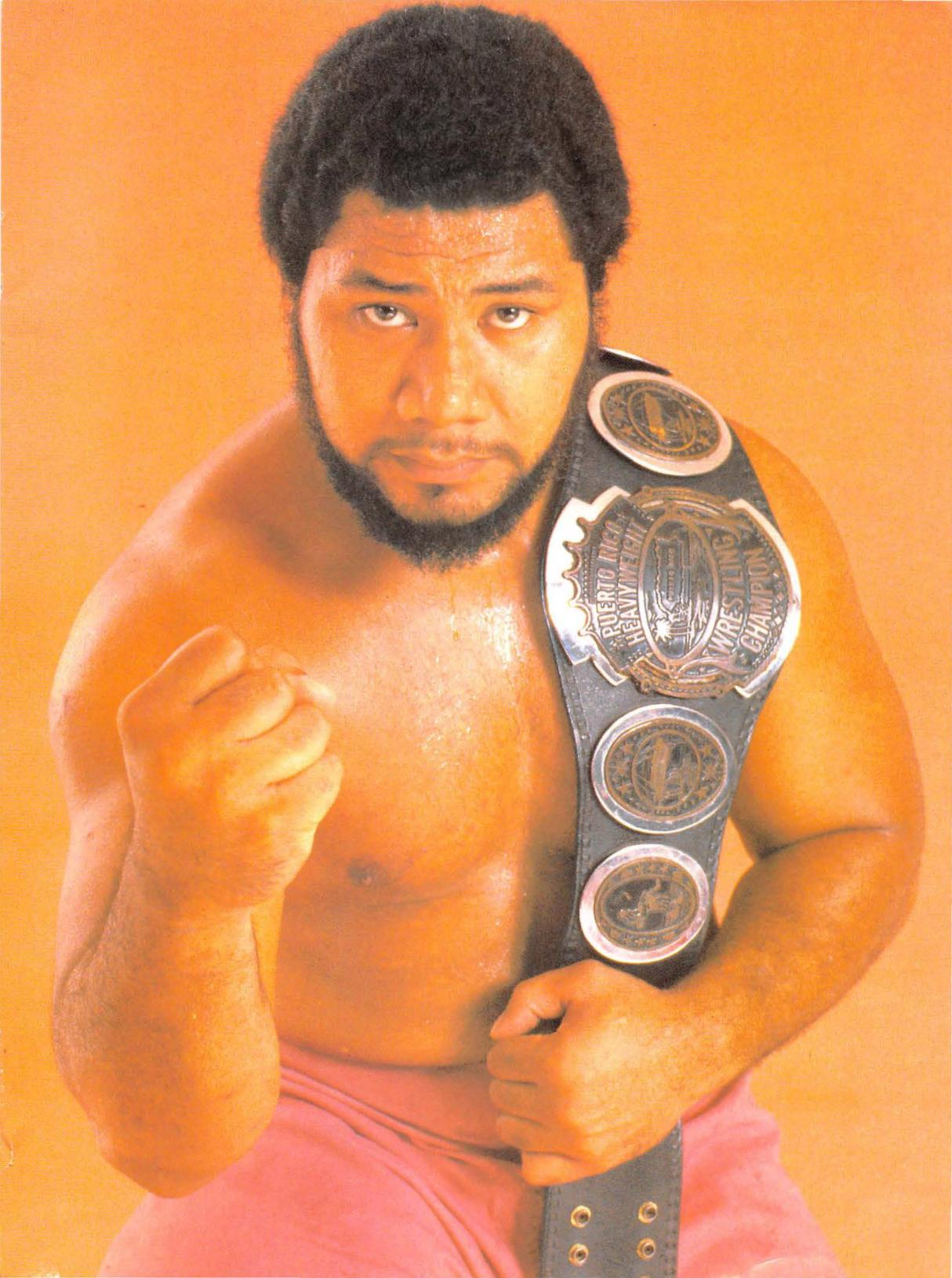
- King Tonga displaying the belt as champion in 1983

Details
- Promotion: World Wrestling Council; Americas Wrestling Federation
- Date established: January 6, 1974
- Current champion: Mike Nice
- Date won: October 24, 2026

Other name
- AWF Puerto Rico Heavyweight Championship
Statistics
- First champion: José Miguel Pérez
- Most reigns: Invader I (12 reigns)
- Longest reign: José Miguel Pérez (426 days)
- Shortest reign: José Rivera, Jr. (1 day)

The WWC Puerto Rico Championship is the secondary professional wrestling championship that is defended by the World Wrestling Council based in Puerto Rico. The title was created in January 1974 and, as its name suggests, is defended exclusively within Puerto Rico. Overall, the title has been possessed by seventy-five different wrestlers throughout the title's existence. The first champion was José Miguel Pérez, who was billed as champion upon the title's creation. He also holds the longest reign, at 426 days. Invader I holds the record for most reigns at 12.

== Belt designs ==
The belt and its design have been changed several times for a number of reasons.

The location represented in the title's name has changed twice, both times in unofficial fashion after being rechristened and modified by its current holder in under to sell a villainous persona. During Fidel Sierra's second reign, which began on June 2, 2001, and lasted for three months, he defended the title under the name of "Cuba Heavyweight Championship". To illustrate this change, he covered the word "Puerto Rico" in the main banner with a sticker that was inscribed with the word "Cuba", also covering the map of Puerto Rico that was featured in the center of the plate with a sticker of the flag of Cuba. Sierra also covered the side plates with photos of him and his manager, Fantasy. All of these changes were reverted as soon as he lost the title. After winning the title on September 10, 2005, Brent Dail defended it as the "51st State Championship", a reference to the statehood movement and its intention to annex Puerto Rico as the 51st state of the United States. Like Sierra, he covered the main banner with a sticker inscribed with "51^{st} State" and flanked the main plate with additional stickers featuring the acronym "USA". The stickers were removed by the following champion as soon as he won the title, reverting the changes.

== Title history ==
†	Indicates title reigns and changes not recognized by WWC.

Names	Dates	Ref(s).
CSP/WWC Puerto Rico Heavyweight Championship	January 6, 1974 – present	
AWF Puerto Rico Heavyweight Championship (unofficial)	December 16, 1991 – December 5, 1993	
Cuba Heavyweight Championship (unofficial)	June 2, 2001 – September 9, 2001	
51st State Heavyweight Championship (unofficial)	September 10, 2005 – November 5, 2005	

Key
No.	Overall reign number
Reign	Reign number for the specific champion
Days	Number of days held
<1	Reign lasted less than a day
+	Current reign is changing daily

No.	Champion	Championship change			Reign statistics		Notes	Ref.
No.	Champion	Date	Event	Location	Reign	Days	Notes	Ref.
1	José Miguel Pérez	January 6, 1974	House show	Guaynabo, Puerto Rico	1	426	Won a 6-man tournament final on WWC's first show.	
2	Dr. Klodied	March 8, 1975	House show	Caguas, Puerto Rico	1	14		
3	José Miguel Pérez	March 22, 1975	House show	Bayamón, Puerto Rico	2	161		
—	Vacated	August 30, 1975	—	Bayamón, Puerto Rico	—	—	Title held up after match between José Miguel Pérez and Spoiler II .	
4	José Miguel Pérez	September 20, 1975	House show	Caguas, Puerto Rico	3	14	Pérez defeated Spoiler II to win the vacant title.	
5	Tosh Togo	October 4, 1975	House show	Bayamón, Puerto Rico	1	70		
—	Vacated	December 13, 1975	—	Caguas, Puerto Rico	—	—	Tosh Togo was stripped for deliberately being counted out to keep the title.	
6	Hercules Ayala	February 21, 1976	House show	Bayamón, Puerto Rico	1	91	Defeat Spoiler I in a 6-man tournament final.	
7	Tor Kamata	May 22, 1976	House show	Caguas, Puerto Rico	1	91		
8	José Rivera	August 21, 1976	House show	Caguas, Puerto Rico	1	126		
9	Eric The Red	December 25, 1976	House show	Bayamón, Puerto Rico	1	98	Also defeat Carlos Colón for the WWC North American Heavyweight Championship on October 16, 1976 in Bayamón, Puerto Rico.	
—	Vacated	April 2, 1977	—	San Juan, Puerto Rico	—	—	Title held up after match Eric The Red and Ernie Ladd.	
10	José Miguel Pérez	May 7, 1977	House show	Bayamón, Puerto Rico	4	14	Defeated Huracán Castillo in 6-man tournament final.	
11	Huracán Castillo (Pedro Castillo)	May 21, 1977	House show	Caguas, Puerto Rico	1	28		
12	Hercules Ayala	June 18, 1977	House show	Caguas, Puerto Rico	2	98		
13	Invader I	September 24, 1977	House show	Bayamón, Puerto Rico	1	21		
14	Carlos Colón	October 15, 1977	House show	Bayamón, Puerto Rico	1	175		
15	Ox Baker	April 8, 1978	House show	Caguas, Puerto Rico	1	28		
16	Carlos Colón	May 6, 1978	House show	Bayamón, Puerto Rico	2	70		
17	Kengo Kimura	July 15, 1978	House show	Caguas, Puerto Rico	1	28		
18	Carlos Colón	August 12, 1978	House show	Caguas, Puerto Rico	3	98		
19	Abdullah the Butcher	November 18, 1978	House show	Bayamón, Puerto Rico	1	255		
20	Pampero Firpo	July 31, 1979	House show	Bayamón, Puerto Rico	1	11		
—	Vacated	August 11, 1979	—	Bayamón, Puerto Rico	—	—	Title held up after match between Carlos Colón and Pampero Firpo.	
21	Carlos Colón	September 22, 1979	House show	Bayamón, Puerto Rico	4	84	Defeated Pampero Firpo in rematch to win the vacant title.	
22	Abdullah the Butcher	December 15, 1979	House show	Bayamón, Puerto Rico	2	21		
—	Vacated	January 5, 1980	—	Bayamón, Puerto Rico	—	—	Title held up after match between Carlos Colón and Abdullah the Butcher.	
23	Carlos Colón	January 12, 1980	House show	Bayamón, Puerto Rico	5	476	Defeated Abdullah the Butcher in a rematch to win the vacant title.	
—	Vacated	May 2, 1981	—	San Juan, Puerto Rico	—	—	Held up after match between Carlos Colón and Killer Karl Krupp.	
24	Carlos Colón	May 9, 1981	House show	Bayamón, Puerto Rico	6	93	Defeated Killer Karl Krupp to win the vacant title.	
25	Abdullah the Butcher	August 10, 1981	House show	San Juan, Puerto Rico	3	47	Defeat Carlos Colón to win WWC Puerto Rico and North America Heavyweight titles.	
26	Carlos Colón	September 12, 1981	House show	Bayamón, Puerto Rico	7	147	Defeat Abdullah The Butcher win the WWC Puerto Rico and North American Heavyweight titles.	
27	Mongolian Stomper	February 6, 1982	House show	Bayamón, Puerto Rico	1	35	Defeat Carlos Colón to win WWC Puerto Rico Heavyweight title only.	
28	Carlos Colón	March 13, 1982	House show	Bayamón, Puerto Rico	8	154		
—	Vacated	July 24, 1982	—	San Juan, Puerto Rico	—	—	Vacated after Carlos Colón won the WWC World Heavyweight Championship.	
29	Dory Funk Jr.	August 14, 1982	House show	Bayamon, Puerto Rico	1	63	Defeat Pierre Martel in a 6-man tournament final.	
30	Invader I	October 16, 1982	House show	San Juan, Puerto Rico	2	91	Invader I also won the WWC North American Heavyweight Championship on March 27, 1982. He later defeated Dory Funk, Jr. in a double title Texas death match for both WWC North American Championship and the WWC Puerto Rico Heavyweight Championship.	
31	King Tonga	January 15, 1983	House show	San Juan, Puerto Rico	1	281		
32	Bob Sweetan	October 23, 1983	House show	Mayagüez, Puerto Rico	1	153		
33	King Tonga	March 24, 1984	House show	Bayamón, Puerto Rico	2	49		
34	Terry Gibbs	May 12, 1984	House show	Bayamón, Puerto Rico	1	33		
35	Hercules Ayala	June 14, 1984	House show	Bayamón, Puerto Rico	3	23		
36	Konga The Barbarian	July 7, 1984	House show	Bayamón, Puerto Rico	1	70		
37	Invader I	September 15, 1984	WWC Aniversario 1984	San Juan, Puerto Rico	3	82		
38	Black Gordman	December 6, 1984	House show	Bayamón, Puerto Rico	1	125		
39	Super Médico I	April 10, 1985	House show	Aguadilla, Puerto Rico	1	59		
40	Fidel Sierra	June 8, 1985	House show	Caguas, Puerto Rico	1	28		
41	Super Médico I	July 6, 1985	House show	Carolina, Puerto Rico	2	42		
42	Eric Embry	August 17, 1985	House show	Bayamón, Puerto Rico	1	273		
43	Super Médico I	May 17, 1986	House show	Caguas, Puerto Rico	3	14		
44	Eric Embry	May 31, 1986	House show	Bayamón, Puerto Rico	2	28		
45	Invader I	June 28, 1986	House show	Bayamón, Puerto Rico	4	116		
46	Al Pérez	October 19, 1986	House show	San Juan, Puerto Rico	1	41		
47	Mighty Igor	November 29, 1986	House show	San Juan, Puerto Rico	1	189		
48	Kareem Mumhammad	June 6, 1987	House show	Guaynabo, Puerto Rico	1	190		
49	Miguel Perez, Jr.	December 13, 1987	House show	San Juan, Puerto Rico	1	153		
50	Super Black Ninja	May 14, 1988	House show	Caguas, Puerto Rico	1	84		
51	Ricky Santana	August 6, 1988	House show	San Juan, Puerto Rico	1	63		
52	Bobby Jaggers	October 8, 1988	House show	Carolina, Puerto Rico	1	47		
53	Ricky Santana	November 24, 1988	House show	Carolina, Puerto Rico	2	23		
54	Hercules Ayala	December 17, 1988	House show	Bayamón, Puerto Rico	4	21		
55	Carlos Colón	January 7, 1989	House Show	San Juan, Puerto Rico	9	14	Carlos Colón defeat Hercules Ayala in a lost a loser-leaves-town match.	
56	Sika	January 21, 1989	House Show	Puerto Rico	1	14		
57	TNT	February 4, 1989	House show	Bayamón, Puerto Rico	1	21		
58	Abudda Dein	February 25, 1989	House show	Carolina, Puerto Rico	1	78		
59	Invader I	May 14, 1989	House show	San Juan, Puerto Rico	5	62		
60	Ivan Koloff	July 15, 1989	House show	Caguas, Puerto Rico	1	84		
61	Invader I	October 7, 1989	House show	Bayamón, Puerto Rico	6	98		
62	Manny Fernandez	January 13, 1990	House show	Bayamón, Puerto Rico	1	168		
—	Vacated	June 30, 1990	—	—	—	—	Vacated after Manny Fernandez suffered a legitimate injury.	
Championship history is unrecorded from July 1990 to September 1991.
63	Huracán Castillo, Jr.	October 12, 1991	House show	Bayamón, Puerto Rico	1	65	Defeat Héctor Guerrero in a 6-man tournament final.	
—	Vacated	December 16, 1991	—	—	—	—	Declared vacant when Huracán Castillo, Jr. left from WWC.	
AWF Puerto Rico Heavyweight Championship
64	Jake Roberts	June 5, 1993	House show	Caguas, Puerto Rico	1	183	Won a 6-man tournament final.	
—	Vacated	December 5, 1993	—	—	—	—	Title declared vacant when the Americas Wrestling Federation closed.	
WWC Puerto Rico Heavyweight Championship
65	Ray González	August 6, 1994	House show	Carolina, Puerto Rico	1	203	Defeat Jason The Terrible in a 6-man tournament final to win the vacant title. The exact length of the reign is uncertain.	
66	Jason the Terrible	February 25, 1995	House show	San Lorenzo, Puerto Rico	1	112		
67	Invader I	June 17, 1995	House show	N/A	7	154		
68	El Bronco I	November 18, 1995	House show	Bayamón, Puerto Rico	1	49		
69	Invader I	January 6, 1996	House show	San Juan, Puerto Rico	8	154		
70	Huracán Castillo, Jr.	June 8, 1996	House show	Arroyo, Puerto Rico	2	173		
—	Vacated	November 28, 1996	—	—	—	—	Title held-up after a match against Ray Gonzalez.	
71	Ray González	December 15, 1996	House show	Caguas, Puerto Rico	2	104	Defeat Castillo in a rematch.	
72	Huracán Castillo, Jr.	March 29, 1997	House show	Bayamón, Puerto Rico	3	29		
73	Ray González	April 27, 1997	House show	Cabo Rojo, Puerto Rico	3	31		
74	Mohammed Hussein	May 28, 1997	House show	Gurabo, Puerto Rico	1	101		
75	Ricky Santana	September 6, 1997	House show	Humacao, Puerto Rico	3	82		
76	Villano III	October 25, 1997	House show	Caguas, Puerto Rico	1	35		
77	Ricky Santana	November 29, 1997	House show	Arecibo, Puerto Rico	4	22		
78	Villano III	December 21, 1997	House show	San Germán, Puerto Rico	2	69		
79	Rico Suave	February 28, 1998	House Show	Caguas, Puerto Rico	1	154		
80	Glamour Boy Shane	August 1, 1998	WWC 25th Aniversario	San Juan, Puerto Rico	1	91		
81	Victor The Bodyguard	October 31, 1998	House show	Ponce, Puerto Rico	1	112		
82	Carlos Colón	February 20, 1999	House show	Humacao, Puerto Rico	10	120		
—	Vacated	June 20, 1999	—	—	—	—	Vacated when Carlos Colón suffered a knee injury.	
83	José Rivera, Jr.	July 10, 1999	House show	Guaynabo, Puerto Rico	1	63	Defeated Victor The Bodyguard in a tournament final to win the vacant title.	
84	Mustafa Saed	September 11, 1999	House show	Fajardo, Puerto Rico	1	42		
85	El Nene	October 23, 1999	House show	Manatí, Puerto Rico	1	19	Pinned "Mr.Hardcore"Rico Suave in a handicap match.	
86	Harley Lewis	November 11, 1999	House show	Cayey, Puerto Rico	1	69		
87	José Rivera, Jr.	January 19, 2000	House show	Carolina, Puerto Rico	2	24		
88	Rex King	February 12, 2000	House show	Guaynabo, Puerto Rico	1	43		
89	Titán	March 26, 2000	House show	Carolina, Puerto Rico	1	188		
90	Invader I	September 30, 2000	House show	Carolina, Puerto Rico	9	161		
91	Paul LeDuc	March 10, 2001	House show	Morovis, Puerto Rico	1	28		
92	Invader I	April 7, 2001	House show	Carolina, Puerto Rico	10	56		
93	Fidel Sierra	June 2, 2001	IPW Hardcore Civil War 2001	Morovis, Puerto Rico	2	98		
94	Invader I	September 8, 2001	WWC 28th Aniversario: Septiembre Negro	Bayamón, Puerto Rico	11	28		
95	Jim Steele	October 6, 2001	House show	Caguas, Puerto Rico	1	28		
96	Invader I	November 3, 2001	House show	Caguas, Puerto Rico	12	98		
97	Ray González	February 9, 2002	House show	Orocovis, Puerto Rico	4	28		
98	Hercules Ayala	March 9, 2002	House show	Caguas, Puerto Rico	5	28		
99	Ray González	April 6, 2002	House show	Humacao, Puerto Rico	5	28		
100	El Yunque	May 4, 2002	House show	Caguas, Puerto Rico	1	64		
—	Vacated	July 7, 2002	—	—	—	—	Title Vacated after El Yunque left from WWC.	
101	Ricky Santana	November 28, 2002	House show	Mayagüez, Puerto Rico	5	16	Defeat El Nene in a 6-man tournament final.	
102	El Nene	December 14, 2002	House show	Caguas, Puerto Rico	2	23		
—	Vacated	January 6, 2003	—	Caguas, Puerto Rico	—	—	Title held up after match against Fidel Sierra.	
103	Fidel Sierra	January 11, 2003	House show	Morovis, Puerto Rico	3	14	Defeated El Nene to win the vacant title.	
104	El Nene	January 25, 2003	House show	San Lorenzo, Puerto Rico	3	91		
—	Vacated	April 26, 2003	—	—	—	—	Vacant after El Nene left WWC.	
105	Eddie Colón	May 31, 2003	House show	Carolina, Puerto Rico	1	49	Defeat El Diamante in a 6-man tournament final to win the vacant title.	
106	El Diamante	July 19, 2003	House show	Carolina, Puerto Rico	1	49	El Diamante unified the title with the WWC Television Championship on August 2, 2003 in Guayanilla, Puerto Rico.	
—	Vacated	September 6, 2003	—	Guayanilla, Puerto Rico	—	—	Vacant due to focus for the WWC Universal Heavyweight Championship.	
107	José Rivera Jr.	October 18, 2003	House show	Caguas, Puerto Rico	3	14	Defeat Eddie Colón in a 6-man tournament final to win the vacant title.	
108	Eddie Colón	November 1, 2003	House show	Cidra, Puerto Rico	2	14		
109	José Rivera, Jr.	November 15, 2003	House show	Guaynabo, Puerto Rico	4	14		
110	Eddie Colón	November 29, 2003	House show	Bayamón, Puerto Rico	3	21		
111	José Rivera, Jr.	December 20, 2003	House show	Caguas, Puerto Rico	5	8		
—	Vacated	December 28, 2003	—	Caguas, Puerto Rico	—	—	Held-up after a match vs Eddie Colón.	
113	José Rivera, Jr.	January 3, 2004	House show	Bayamón, Puerto Rico	6	21	Defeated Eddie Colón to win the vacant title.	
—	Vacated	January 24, 2004	—	Caguas, Puerto Rico	—	—	Held-up in a match against Vengador Boricua.	
114	José Rivera, Jr.	February 7, 2004	House show	Caguas, Puerto Rico	7	77	Defeated Vengador Boricua to regain the title.	
115	Huracán Castillo, Jr.	April 24, 2004	House show	Caguas, Puerto Rico	4	14		
116	José Rivera, Jr.	May 8, 2004	House show	Caguas, Puerto Rico	8	7		
117	Huracán Castillo, Jr.	May 15, 2004	House show	Caguas, Puerto Rico	5	49	Huracán Castillo, Jr. won the title by forfeit when Rivera Jr. failed to show up to the show.	
118	Eddie Colón	July 3, 2004	House show	Caguas, Puerto Rico	4	112		
119	El Bronco I	October 23, 2004	House show	Camuy, Puerto Rico	2	14		
120	Eddie Colón	November 6, 2004	House show	Guaynabo, Puerto Rico	5	13	This was a double title match for the WWC Universal and the WWC Puerto Rico Heavyweight Championship.	
121	El Bronco I	November 19, 2004	House show	Adjuntas, Puerto Rico	3	22		
122	Eric Alexander	December 11, 2004	House show	Caguas, Puerto Rico	1	105		
123	La Amenaza Bryan	March 26, 2005	WWC Friday Madness	Caguas, Puerto Rico	1	55		
124	Chris Joel	May 20, 2005	WWC Friday Madness	Bayamón, Puerto Rico	1	113		
125	Brent Dail	September 10, 2005	House show	Caguas, Puerto Rico	1	56		
126	Abbad	November 5, 2005	WWC 32nd Aniversario 2005	Bayamón, Puerto Rico	1	35		
127	Rico Suave	December 10, 2005	WWC Season Ending Tour 2005	Bayamón, Puerto Rico	2	58		
128	Abbad	February 4, 2006	WWC La Hora de la Verdad III	Bayamón, Puerto Rico	2	14	This was a no rope barbed wired match.	
129	Rico Suave	February 18, 2006	House show	Villalba, Puerto Rico	3	35		
130	El Bronco I	March 25, 2006	House show	Carolina, Puerto Rico	4	21	This was a street fight match.	
131	Heartthrob Romeo	April 15, 2006	WWC Camino A La Glorida – Fase Especial	Carolina, Puerto Rico	1	7		
132	El Bronco I	April 22, 2006	House show	Bayamón, Puerto Rico	5	63	This was a loser leaves town match.	
133	Alex Montalvo	June 24, 2006	WWC 2nd Annual Bruiser Brody Cup Tour	Bayamón, Puerto Rico	1	77		
134	Fire Blaze	September 9, 2006	House show	Ponce, Puerto Rico	1	56	Previously known as Fire Blazer.	
135	Barrabás, Jr.	November 4, 2006	House show	Salinas, Puerto Rico	1	43	This was a Lumberjack match.	
136	Fire Blaze	December 17, 2006	WWC Lockout	Bayamón, Puerto Rico	2	20	This was a fatal 4-way Mask vs. Hair vs. Career vs. title match also involving Rico Suave, Alex Montalvo and Barrabás, Jr. Tim Arson was the special guest referee.	
137	Alex Montalvo	January 6, 2007	House show	Bayamón, Puerto Rico	2	35		
138	Fire Blaze	February 10, 2007	House show	Manatí, Puerto Rico	3	42		
139	Ash Rubinsky	March 24, 2007	WWC Camino A La Gloria 2007	Ponce, Puerto Rico	1	14		
140	Fire Blaze	April 7, 2007	WWC Camino A La Gloria 2007	Caguas, Puerto Rico	4	21	This was a Ladder match.	
141	Huracán Castillo, Jr.	April 28, 2007	House show	Ponce, Puerto Rico	6	161	This was a Chain Match, later defeat Jeff Jeffrey and Rico Suave in a double title match for the WWC Television Championship on september 14, 2007 in Ponce, Puerto Rico.	
142	Crazy Rudy	October 6, 2007	House show	Ponce, Puerto Rico	1	21		
143	"Jumping" Jeff Jeffrey	October 27, 2007	House show	Ponce, Puerto Rico	1	70		
—	Vacated	January 5, 2008	—	—	—	—	Vacated after Jeff Jeffrey left WWC.	
144	BJ	July 19, 2008	WWC 35th Aniversario 2008	San Juan, Puerto Rico	1	21	This was an open challenge match for the vacant title also involving Crazy Rudy, Fidel Sierra, Huracán Castillo, Jr. and Jose Rivera Jr., Rico Suave and Tommy Diablo.	
145	Tommy Diablo	August 9, 2008	House show	Bayamón, Puerto Rico	1	126		
146	BJ	December 13, 2008	WWC Lockout 2008	Bayamón, Puerto Rico	2	63		
147	Charles Evans	February 14, 2009	House show	Manatí, Puerto Rico	1	20	This was a street fight match.	
148	BJ	March 6, 2009	House show	Ponce, Puerto Rico	3	71	This was a no disqualification match.	
149	Idol Stevens	May 16, 2009	WWC Honor vs. Traicion 2009 Tour	Caguas, Puerto Rico	1	84		
150	Glamour Boy Shane	August 8, 2009	House show	Aibonito, Puerto Rico	2	49		
151	Orlando Colón	September 26, 2009	WWC Septiembre Negro Tour	Bayamón, Puerto Rico	5	154	This was a lumberjack match.	
152	El Sensacional Carlitos	February 27, 2010	House show	Ponce, Puerto Rico	1	134		
153	Orlando Colón	July 11, 2010	WWC 37th Aniversario 2010 Weekend	Bayamón, Puerto Rico	6	76		
154	El Sensacional Carlitos	September 25, 2010	WWC Septiembre Negro	Bayamón, Puerto Rico	2	28	This was a steel cage match.	
155	Black Pain	October 23, 2010	WWC Halloween Wrestling Xtravanza	Bayamón, Puerto Rico	1	21		
156	El Sensacional Carlitos	November 13, 2010	House Show	Bayamón, Puerto Rico	3	14		
157	Gilbert	November 27, 2010	House Show	Bayamón, Puerto Rico	1	15		
158	El Sensacional Carlitos	December 12, 2010	WWC Lockout	Bayamón, Puerto Rico	4	69		
159	Hideo Saito	February 19, 2011	House show	Carolina, Puerto Rico	1	35		
160	Glamour Boy Shane	March 26, 2011	House show	Bayamón, Puerto Rico	3	49		
161	Gilbert	May 14, 2011	House Show	Bayamón, Puerto Rico	2	112		
162	El Sensacional Carlitos	September 3, 2011	House Show	Bayamón, Puerto Rico	5	7	Title awarded after Gilbert no shows in a match.	
163	Gilbert	September 10, 2011	House Show	Carolina, Puerto Rico	3	161		
—	Vacated	February 18, 2012	—	San Juan, Puerto Rico	—	—	Gilbert gave the title to focus on the WWC Universal Heavyweight Championship. However, Jovica's reign is not recognized and the title was declared vacant.	
164	Johnny Ringo	March 4, 2012	House show	Bayamón, Puerto Rico	1	55	This was a four-way match for the vacant title also involving La Amenaza Bryan, Joe Bravo and Mr. Big.	
165	La Amenaza Bryan	April 28, 2012	House show	Guaynabo, Puerto Rico	2	42	This was a triple threat match also involving Joe Bravo.	
—	Vacated	June 9, 2012	—	Cataño, Puerto Rico	—	—	Vacated after Amenaza Bryan left WWC. The tournament final between Gilbert and Apolo on November 24, 2012 in Bayamón, Puerto Rico ended in a double disqualification.	
166	Gilbert	December 9, 2012	WWC Lockout	Bayamón, Puerto Rico	4	48	This was a no disqualification no time limit match for the vacant title.	
—	Vacated	January 26, 2013	—	Cataño, Puerto Rico	—	—	Vacated after Gilbert suffered an injury.	
168	Samson Walker	January 26, 2013	House show	Cataño, Puerto Rico	1	14	Walker was awarded the title after Gilbert was not able to defend it.	
169	Chicano	February 9, 2013	House show	Cataño, Puerto Rico	1	22		
169	Samson Walker	March 3, 2013	House show	Bayamón, Puerto Rico	2	13		
170	Chicano	March 16, 2013	WWC La Hora de la Verdad 2013	Bayamón, Puerto Rico	2	133	This was a Boxing Match in which Chicano defeated Samson Walker by knockout.	
171	El Bronco I	July 27, 2013	House Show	Bayamón, Puerto Rico	6	112		
172	Apolo	November 16, 2013	WWC Crossfire – Day 1	Bayamón, Puerto Rico	1	134		
173	TNT	March 30, 2014	WWC La Hora de la Verdad – Day 2	Bayamón, Puerto Rico	2	20		
—	Vacated	April 19, 2014	—	Bayamón, Puerto Rico	—	—	Title held up after a match between TNT and Apolo ended in a no contest.	
174	TNT	April 26, 2014	House show	Bayamón, Puerto Rico	3	84	Defeated Apolo in rematch for the vacant title.	
175	Carlito Caribbean Cool	July 19, 2014	House show	Bayamón, Puerto Rico	1	83		
176	Gilbert	October 10, 2014	House show	Yabucoa, Puerto Rico	5	15		
177	Chicano	October 25, 2014	WWC Aniversario 41 – Day 2	Caguas, Puerto Rico	3	14		
178	Gilbert	November 8, 2014	House show	Bayamón, Puerto Rico	6	28		
179	Chicano	December 6, 2014	WWC Lockdown – Day 2	Bayamón, Puerto Rico	4	49		
180	Ricardo Rodriguez	January 24, 2015	WWC La Hora De La Verdad – Day 1	Bayamón, Puerto Rico	1	28		
181	Chicano	February 21, 2015	House show	Bayamón, Puerto Rico	5	7		
182	Member of La Revolución	February 28, 2015	House show	Cataño, Puerto Rico	1	77	A masked member of the stable La Revolución won the title. His true identity is still unknown.	
183	Mike Mendoza	May 16, 2015	House show	Isabela, Puerto Rico	1	77		
184	Member of La Revolución	August 1, 2015	WWC Noche de Campeones – Day 1	Bayamón, Puerto Rico	2	56		
185	El Hijo de Ray González	September 26, 2015	WWC Aniversario 42 – Day 2	Bayamón, Puerto Rico	1	21		
186	Joe Bravo	October 17, 2015	House show	Bayamón, Puerto Rico	1	21		
187	Miguel Pérez Jr.	November 7, 2015	WWC Lockout 2015 – Day 2	Bayamón, Puerto Rico	2	77		
188	Ángel Fashion	January 23, 2016	House show	Bayamón, Puerto Rico	1	56	This was a triple threat match also involving Joe Bravo	
189	El Sensacional Carlitos	March 19, 2016	House show	Bayamón, Puerto Rico	6	7	Defeated Ángel Fashion in the first of 2-fall match with the stipulation that Puerto Rico title is on the line for the first fall and hair-vs-hair for the second fall.	
190	Ángel Fashion	March 26, 2016	House show	Bayamón, Puerto Rico	2	66		
191	Chicano	May 28, 2016	House show	Bayamón, Puerto Rico	6	224		
192	Mike Mendoza	January 7, 2017	WWC Superestrellas de la Lucha Libre Sabado	Bayamón, Puerto Rico	2	112	Won a 9-man battle royal by lastly eliminating El Hijo de Ray González	
193	Lightning	April 29, 2017	House show	Manatí, Puerto Rico	1	98		
194	Gilbert	August 5, 2017	WWC Summer Madness 2017	Bayamón, Puerto Rico	7	225		
195	Chicano	March 18, 2018	WWC Camino A La Gloria – Day 1	Dorado, Puerto Rico	7	13		
196	Mighty Ursus	March 31, 2018	House Show	Manatí, Puerto Rico	1	15	Defeat Chicano and Thunder in a 3-way match.	
197	Lightning	April 15, 2018	House show	Dorado, Puerto Rico	2	122		
198	El Comandante	August 15, 2018	House Show	Guaynabo, Puerto Rico	1	80		
199	Chicano	November 3, 2018	House Show	Guaynabo, Puerto Rico	8	63	Defeat El Gran Armando, substituting for El Comandante, who is not present but cannot wrestle.	
200	Pedro Portillo III	January 5, 2019	WWC Euphoria	Guaynabo, Puerto Rico	1	224		
201	Bellito Calderón	August 17, 2019	WWC Anniversary	Guaynabo, Puerto Rico	1	98		
202	Mighty Ursus	November 23, 2019	WWC Noche de Campeones	Bayamón, Puerto Rico	2	413		
—	Vacated	January 9, 2021	—	San Juan, Puerto Rico	—	—	Vacated after Mighty Ursus renounced the title. A new champion will be decided between Bellito Calderón and Pedro Portillo III during the event Cuentas Pendientes, televised on the TV show on different dates.	
203	Bellito Calderón	February 6, 2021	WWC Cuentas Pendientes	San Juan, Puerto Rico	2	174	Defeated Pedro Portillo III to crown a new champion for the vacated title.	
204	Xavant	July 30, 2021	WWC House Show	Caguas, Puerto Rico	1	246		
205	Carlos Carlderón	April 2, 2022	WWC House Show	Manatí, Puerto Rico	3	49		
206	Nihan	May 21, 2022	WWC House Show	Manatí, Puerto Rico	1	232		
207	Mike Nice	January 8, 2023	WWC House Show	San Juan, Puerto Rico	1	265		
208	Makabro	September 30,2023	WWC House Show	Bayamon, Puerto Rico	1	70		
209	Gilbert	December 9, 2023	WWC House Show	Bayamon, Puerto Rico	8	266		
210	Xavant	August 31, 2024	WWC Aniversario 51	Bayamón, Puerto Rico	2	70	This was a TLC match where Xavant's WWC Caribbean Heavyweight Championship was also defended.	
211	Tony Leyenda	November 9, 2024	WWC Lockout	Bayamón, Puerto Rico	1	112		
212	Ray González	March 1, 2025	Noche de Campeones	Bayamón, Puerto Rico	6	91		
213	Carlito Caribbean Cool	May 31, 2025	WWC Summer Madness	Bayamón, Puerto Rico	2	21		
—	Vacated	June 21, 2025	—	Bayamón, Puerto Rico	—	—	Carlito was stripped of the title after his brother Eddie Colón decided he was going to hold a battle royal tournament called La Bronca Boricua to crown the new champion of Puerto Rico.	
214	Tony Leyenda	June 28, 2025	La Resistencia	Bayamón, Puerto Rico	2	64	He won the vacant championship in a battle royal tournament called La Bronca Boricua of 17 wrestlers.	
215	Joe Anthony	August 30, 2025	Aniversario 52	Bayamón, Puerto Rico	1	55		
216	Chicano	October 25, 2025	House Show	Moca, Puerto Rico	9	105		
217	John Hawkins	February 7, 2026	House Show	Humacao, Puerto Rico	1	97		
218	Xavant	May 16, 2026	Furia Extrema	Bayamón, Puerto Rico	3	161	Defeat John Hawkins and Joe Bravo 3-way.	
219	Mike Nice	October 24, 2026	Halloween Xtravanganza	Bayamón, Puerto Rico	2	2		

== Combined reigns ==
†	Indicates the current champion

Rank	Wrestler	No. of reigns	Combined days
1	Carlos Colón	10	1,284
2	Invader I	12	967
3	Gilbert	8	925
4	Chicano	9	848
5	Mighty Ursus	2	610
6	José Miguel Pérez	4	608
7	Huracán Castillo, Jr.	6	490
8	Ray González	6	485
9	Xavant	3	477
10	Fire Blaze/Orlando Colon	6	377
11	King Tonga	2	330
12	Abdullah the Butcher	3	323
13	Bellito Calderón	3	321
14	Eric Embry	2	301
15	El Sensacional Carlitos	6	299
16	El Bronco I	6	281
17	Mike Nice	2†	266
18	Hercules Ayala	5	261
19	Rico Suave	3	247
20	José Rivera, Jr.	8	237
21	Nihan	1	232
22	Miguel Pérez Jr.	2	230
23	Villano III	2	225
24	Ricky Santana	5	206
25	Kareem Muhammad	1	190
26	Glamour Boy Shane	3	189
26	Mighty Igor	1	189
27	Titán	1	188
28	Jake Roberts	1	183
30	Mike Mendoza	2	175
31	Eddie Colón	5	174
31	Super Médico I	3	174
31	Tony Leyenda	2	174
31	Manny Fernandez	1	168
32	BJ	3	155
33	Bob Sweetan	1	153
34	El Nene	3	140
34	Member of La Revolución	2	140
35	Apolo	1	134
36	Don Kernodle	1	130
37	José Rivera	1	126
37	Tommy Diablo	1	126
38	TNT	3	125
39	Ángel Fashion	2	119
40	Chris Joel	1	113
41	Jason the Terrible	1	112
41	Victor The Bodyguard	1	112
42	Abudda Dein	1	109
43	Eric Alexander	1	105
43	Lightning	1	105
44	Carlito Caribbean Cool	2	104
45	Mohammed Hussein	1	101
47	Eric the Red	1	98
48	La Amenaza Bryan	2	97
48	John Hawkins	1	97
49	Tor Kamata	1	91
50	Alex Montalvo	2	84
50	Idol Stevens	1	84
50	Ivan Koloff	1	84
50	Super Black Ninja	1	84
51	Konga the Barbarian	1	70
51	"Jumping" Jeff Jeffrey	1	70
51	Tosh Togo	1	70
51	Makabro	1	70
51	Black Gordman	1	66
52	El Yunque	1	64
53	Dory Funk Jr.	1	63
54	Harley Lewis	1	57
55	Brent Dail	1	56
56	Johnny Ringo	1	55
56	Joe Anthony	1	55
57	Abbad	2	49
57	El Diamante	1	49
58	Bobby Jaggers	1	47
59	Rex King	1	43
60	Barrabás, Jr.	1	42
60	Mustafa Saed	1	42
61	Al Perez	1	38
62	Hideo Saito	1	35
62	Huracán Castillo, Sr.	1	35
62	Mongolian Stomper	1	35
63	Samson Walker	2	28
63	Kengo Kimura	1	28
63	Ox Baker	1	28
63	Ricardo Rodriguez	1	28
63	Paul LeDuc	1	28
63	Jim Steele	1	28
64	Crazy Rudy	1	21
64	El Hijo de Ray González	1	21
64	Joe Bravo	1	21
65	Charles Evans	1	20
66	Dr. Klodied	1	14
66	Sika	1	14
66	Ash Rubinsky	1	14
67	Pampero Firpo	1	11
68	Heartthrob Romeo	1	7
