= Ray González Jr. =

Puerto Rican professional wrestler

Ray González
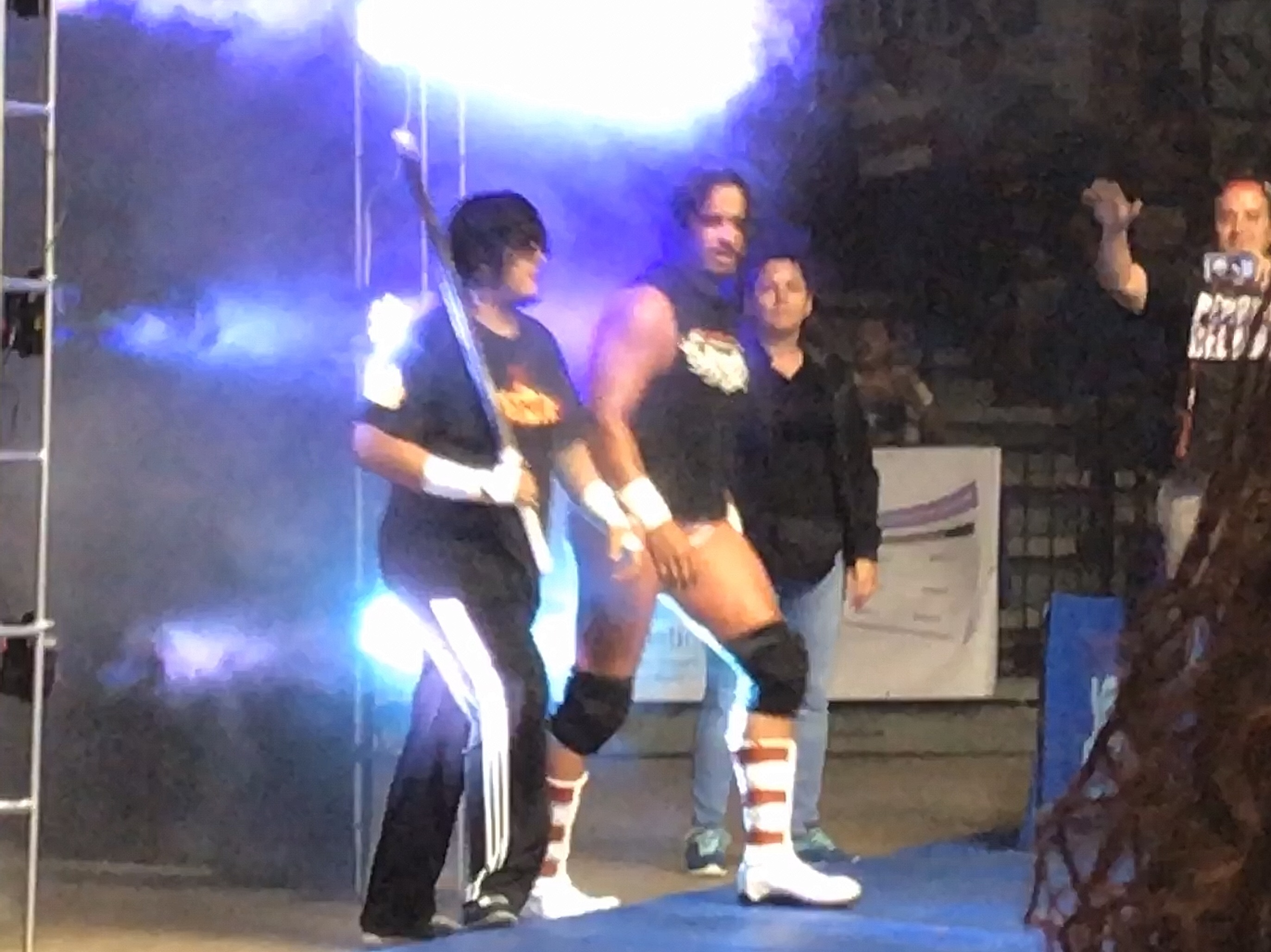
- González (left) and mentor Gilbert (right) as part of El Sindicato in 2018.

Personal information
- Born: April 3, 1998 (age 28) Dorado, Puerto Rico

Professional wrestling career
- Ring name(s): El Hijo de Ray González; Ray González Jr. Ray Jr.
- Billed from: Barrio Mameyal, Dorado
- Debut: 2015

Rey González Echevarria (born April 3, 1998) is a Puerto Rican professional wrestler best known by his ring name Ray González Jr.. He is the son of professional wrestler Ray González, Sr. González began wrestling in the World Wrestling Council at the age of seventeen and has won the World Tag Team and the WWC Puerto Rico Championships.

== Wrestling career ==
=== World Wrestling Council (WWC)(2013-2018) ===
On January 14, 2013, González was involved in a stare-down with Carly Colón, with no consequences. He was formally introduced in a backstage segment on April 27, 2013, where heel manager Orlando Toledo harassed him in order to deliver a message to his father. In January 2015, González, Sr. suffered a legitimate back injury in a match against Colón. While his father recovered, González was introduced to WWC as an active wrestler. His first storyline was a spinoff of his father's feud with Colón, who visited the González's family business and disrespected him by spitting an apple in his face. The following weeks featured various training montages, where his father and other wrestlers aided him in gaining conditioning and polishing his wrestling skill. On April 4, 2015, González made his in-ring debut defeating Ángel "Fashion" Pérez by submission. Unsatisfied with this, Colón began ordering his subordinates to injure and retire him. González went on to defeat Rolando Hernández (performing under the alias of "El Diabólico") next. Both of his adversaries formed an alliance, but were unable to prevent him from winning a rematch with Pérez. On May 3, 2015, González won a handicap match to earn an opportunity against their leader. The match between both took place the following week, with him winning a disqualification in a match dominated by Colón when the heel stable intervened and attacked him.

This feud continued when González teamed with Richard Philipo (known as Xix Xavant) to defeat Pérez and Hernández, but after this match another storyline was started, when both were assaulted by a trio of masked wrestlers known as "La Revolución". The main date of Summer Madness, González joined his father to wrestle Colón and one of the members of this group. The following night he faced a member of La Revolución, the result of which led to a handicap match where he and José Vázquez defeated this wrestler. González and Vázquez teamed again in a match for the WWC World Tag Team Championship but after the latter left the ring and was replaced with Víctor Ortiz (known as Mike Mendoza) their win was revoked. On August 15, 2015, he officially teamed with Ortiz and won a rematch for the titles. The team retained the championship for two weeks, when they dropped them back in a rematch. He was then involved in a storyline where Wilkins Nuñez (known as Joe Bravo) returned to the promotion and sought to retire all second generation wrestlers, with the latter winning an encounter between both by employing illegal tactics. On September 26, 2015, González defeated the third member of La Revolución. He dropped the title to Nuñez on October 17, 2015, after his opponent used the same illegal tactics as before.

The following week González began his involvement in a new storyline, where he was accepted to attend a seminary at the Texas Wrestling Academy. Upon arriving and being welcomed by instructor Rudy Boy González, a student named Scotty Santiago alerted an unknown individual of his presence in the premises. It was subsequently revealed that this was Alberto Rodríguez (known as "El Patrón" Alberto del Rio) who assaulted González in retaliation for his father injuring Ricardo Rodriguez in 2014. This attack lead to a match at Lockout. At the event, González was involved in a confrontation with El Hijo de Dos Caras, leading to a match where father to face El Hijo de Dos Caras in a Street Fight and Ray Jr. to face Santiago at Euphoria 2016. Months later, he defeated El Hijo de Dos Caras on the second night of Aniversario 43; in 2017, he joined El Sindicato, the heel stable led by father, Ray González, adopting a personality that scorned the Puerto Rican public and spoke only English. The following year, he teamed up with fellow El Sindicato member “Precious One” Gilbert in an unsuccessful attempt to win the World Tag Team Championship. In Aniversario 45, Ray and Gilbert faced La Revolución for the World Tag Team Championship, but did not emerge victorious. On July, 28 at the Acrópolis de Manatí, Ray and Gilbert were defeated once again by La Revolución in a title match where, had they lost, Ray would have had to leave WWC.

Return to World Wrestling Council (WWC) (2022-2025)

In April of 2022, Ray returned to WWC after a four-year absence, reuniting with Gilbert—then the leader of the Dynasty—who invited him to join the group. On May 7 at the Acrópolis de Manatí, Ray headed straight to the ring, where Gilbert and Xavant were holding Rey Fénix (Ray González) so that González Jr. could strike him; instead, Ray used his kendo stick to hit both Gilbert and Xavant.

Two years later, on July 6, 2024, Ray made another return to the company by being invited to Gilbert’s interview segment, La Opinión de Gilbert, on La Resistencia, there, he came face to face with WWC Director of Operations Eddie Colón. Later, at Aniversario 51, he faced Colón in a Street Fight and was defeated. The following year, at Euphoria 2025, he once again confronted Colón during a Pipebomb Interview Boricua, where he was attacked by the debuting Manny The Bodyguard Jr.; this sparked a rivalry that led to matches at Noche de Campeones and La Noche Que No Necesita Nombre — the latter ending in a disqualification.

In 2017, Pro Wrestling Illustrated voted him second (24%) in the "Rookie of the Year" category, behind winner Otis Dozovic (28%).

== Personal life ==
In 2020 Rey Gonzalez Jr. became a licensed flying instructor and pilot.

== Championships and accomplishments ==
- World Wrestling Council
  - WWC Puerto Rico Championship (1 time)
  - WWC World Tag Team Championship (1 time) - with Mike Mendoza
