= Chris Angel (wrestler) =

Puerto Rican wrestler (born 1982)

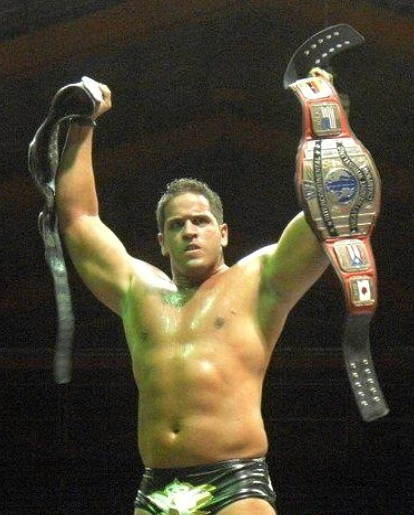
- Chris Angel as the undefeated IWA Intercontinental and Undisputed World Heavyweight Champion.

Personal information
- Born: December 2, 1982 (age 43)

Professional wrestling career
- Ring name(s): Angel; Chris Angel; El Super Fénix #2
- Billed height: 6 ft 3 in (1.91 m)
- Billed weight: 240 lb (110 kg)
- Billed from: Bayamón, Puerto Rico
- Debut: 2007

Chris Angel (born December 2, 1982) is a Puerto Rican professional wrestler. In 2010, he joined the International Wrestling Association, becoming the only local wrestler to win the IWA Intercontinental Championship in his debut and the first to win the IWA Undisputed World Heavyweight Championship undefeated. With this victory, he became the first man to win a world heavyweight championship unpinned within the major local promotions (IWA, World Wrestling Council or Entertainment Wrestling Organization). His fifteen-month winning streak is the longest in the history of the IWA, surpassing the previous record held by "The Cyber Viking" Al Barone, which was stopped at nine months.

Outside of performing, Angel is the only wrestler to be voted "Rookie of the Year" by the public after only a single official match in one of the major promotions in Puerto Rico. In 2011, he was included in the top half of Pro Wrestling Illustrated's 500 Ranking list after only 13 individual contests and a tag team match in the IWA. The following year he repeated his inclusion, being the top ranked wrestler among those that only performed locally.

== Professional wrestling career ==
=== Early life and independent circuit (2004–2010) ===
Upon completing high school, Angel received a combat sports grant from the University of Puerto Rico's Río Piedras campus. Prior to this he had been active in a program held at the Puerto Rico Olympic Committee's high performance school in Salinas, Puerto Rico. By 2005 he had begun his professional wrestling training under Richard Filipo, who eventually founded an independent promotion named Caribbean Wrestling Entertainment. There he wrestled under the ring name "Angel", being booked in multiple victories over Phillip "Clemente" Cardona and Filipo at shows held in Santurce, Comerío, Moca and other subdivisions of the main island's metropolitan area. In 2007, he and Cardona traveled to Ohio Valley Wrestling, working as a tag team. After six months, both were brought in to a company known as New Wrestling Entertainment by Pedro Figueroa, joining several former CWE alumni to form a stable known as "La Realeza". The group performed in the only two shows held before its dissolution, with him serving as its enforcer.

=== International Wrestling Association (2010–2012) ===
==== debut and rise to main eventing ====
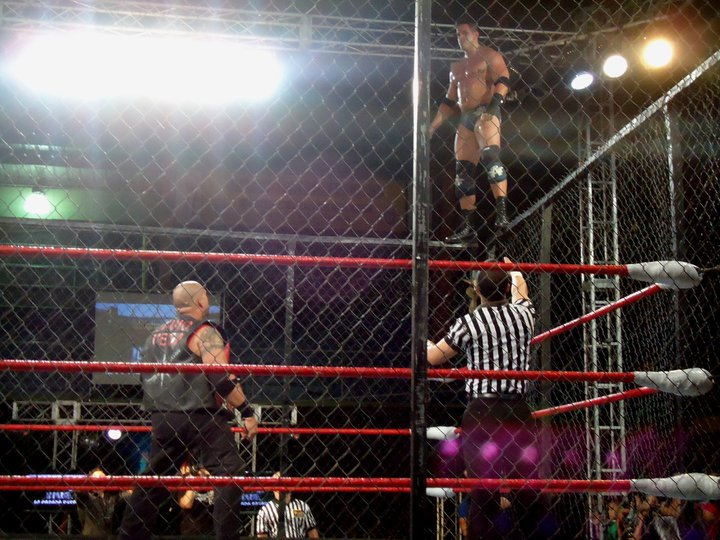
Angel's first defense against Savio Vega at Histeria Boricua 2011

Angel debuted in the International Wrestling Association on October 16, 2010, joining three other wrestlers in assaults against the incumbent Caribbean Heavyweight Champion, the first contender for that title as well as Dennis Rivera, who held three belts including the IWA Undisputed World Heavyweight Championship, and the mandatory challenger for that title. The group, as well as all of its members, remained nameless during the following weeks, but Angel continued interfering in title matches, ambushing both the Intercontinental Champion and his challenger at Halloween Mayhem, an annual event held by the promotion. He was the first member to be named, being called by his ring name "Chris Angel", in an episode of Impacto Total where the group vandalized Savio Vega's wrestling school. On November 20, 2010, the group identified itself as "The Academy" and were officially included in the roster. In this event, Angel once again interrupted a match for the Intercontinental Championship and the IWA's president, Miguel Pérez, Jr., ordered that he would get a title opportunity in his in-ring debut.

The match was scheduled for Christmas in PR, the promotion's season-closing event. An angle was run where the incumbent champion was injured and the title forfeited and awarded to Angel, without even having to compete once in an official match. However, the decision was revoked shortly afterwards and Savio Vega, former heavyweight champion of the IWA, World Wrestling Council, World Wrestling Association, Wrestling Alliance Revolution and Revolution X-Treme Wrestling, emerged as a surprise contender to compete for the championship. Angel won the match by pin fall, following two of his signature moves on the former World Wrestling Federation Superstar. He closed 2010 by winning Puerto Rico Wrestling's "Newcomer of the Year" award, which is selected by popular vote.

==== Undefeated streak and title defenses ====
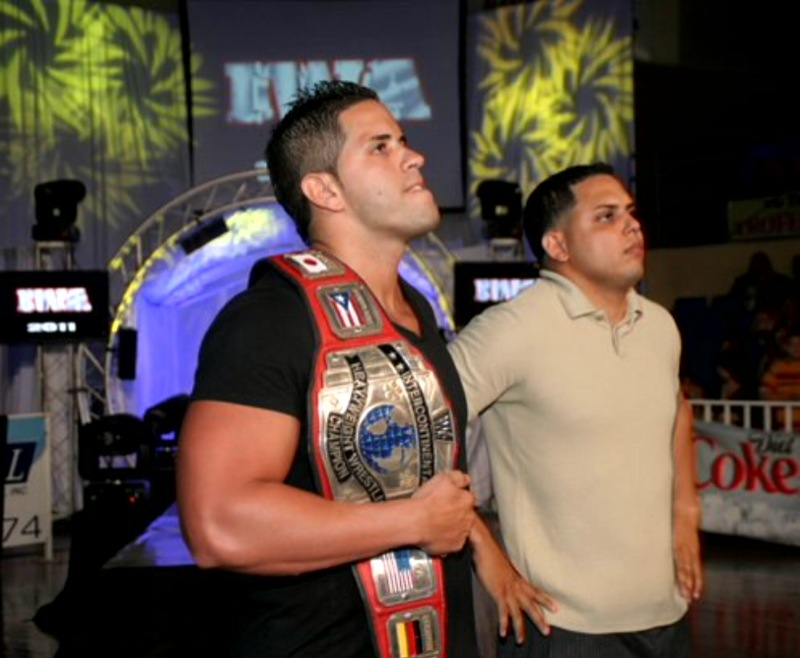
The Academy at Juicio Final 2011

Angel's first title defense was a rematch against Vega in a steel cage match, which took place on January 6, 2011, as part of Histeria Boricua. A storyline was run during the dead season, where Vega demanded the stipulation, noting that he had wins over wrestlers such as "Stone Cold" Steve Austin, Triple H and Dwayne "The Rock" Johnson. Angel retained in a contest that featured multiple false finishes and spots, including a dive from the top of the cage towards the challenger. During the following three weeks, he was loosely involved in an angle with Rivera, while picking up a second successful defense over Edgar "Spectro" Rodríguez. A championship match against Rivera was subsequently scheduled for an annual event titled Payback, where Angel retained following his finishing move. A subsequent rematch concluded in the same manner. At Juicio Final, Angel added another former world champion to his undefeated record, defeating Roberto "La Amenaza" Rubio. In that event, The Academy was merged into a new group, led by Ray González. He closed April by scoring another successful title defense.

Angel's first contest against Filipo since joining IWA was left inconclusive due to external interference. The following week, he won a rematch. On June 11, 2011, Angel won the 6th José Miguel Pérez Sr. Cup in a battle royale, securing an opportunity for the IWA Undisputed Heavyweight Championship. Earlier that night, he participated in a tag team contest but was uninvolved in the outcome. In anticipation of the opportunity, Angel held an open challenge in July, defeating his opponent in a squash match. On July 16, 2011, he defended the first contendership against Noel Rodríguez, winner of the previous José Miguel Pérez Sr. Cup.

=== La Academia Presidencial y Gerencial ===
On July 17, 2011, the IWA and World Wrestling Council began an interpromotional angle, the first between both promotions. At Summer Attitude 2011, Angel defeated Hiram "Tua" Mulero to remain undefeated and win the IWA Undisputed World Heavyweight Championship. In this event, The Academy decided not to side with Team IWA, instead joining the promotion's rouge president, Miguel Pérez, Jr., while taking no offensive action against the invading Team WWC. On August 20, 2011, Angel won a no disqualification contest over IWA Grand Slam Champion, Carlos Cotto. A rematch took place in a handicap match, which was stopped when numerous wrestlers tried to intervene on Cotto's behalf. The contest concluded in a staredown between Angel and Vega's student, Jonathan Ayala then known as "Diego de Jesús", who had won the IWA World Tag Team Championship in his debut weeks earlier. On October 28, 2011, he dropped the Intercontinental Championship in a contest against a masked Cotto, who performed under his international gimmick, El Illegal. At one point during the contest, the referee was unconscious and while Angel was distracted trying to awaken him, a second wrestler wearing the same mask intervened, picking the pinfall in Cotto's behalf. In this event, The Academy turned on Pérez, joining a returning Vega. The following week, the match was declared a "no contest", restoring the undefeated streak and championship. However, later in the same event a 2 on 1 rematch was held, with the Illegal faction regaining the title due to interference from a third masked wrestler. Despite losing the belt, Angel remained unpinned and was uninvolved in the result.

While Vega continued pursuing a feud with Carly Colón in WWC, the angle between The Academy and the Illegal Faction evolved to include the Extreme Wrestling Organization, by now the largest independent promotion and de facto third main contender in Puerto Rico. This occurred when an unmasked Cotto won the EWO World Heavyweight Championship only to be confronted by Pérez, who claimed that he still had a contract with IWA. The feud was supposed to continue at Histeria Boricua 2012, but The Academy no-showed the event and he was stripped of the Undisputed World Championship. The event went on to conclude with EWO's first contender claiming the title. The stable reappeared four days later, holding a reunion with Vega, only to officially leave the promotion on February 13, 2012. By concluding this run, Angel became the first full-time wrestler to hold a perfect record in either of the main promotions. His official IWA record in singles competition is 12 wins by pinfall, 0 losses and 3 no contests, with all of his opponents having held a title within the promotion at least once, including five former Undisputed or Universal World Heavyweight Champions.

=== Freelancer and World Wrestling Council (2012–2013) ===
He reappeared on April 9, 2012, announcing a future press conference in a reunion where Ayala, now known as "Sebastían Guerra" was presented as the new member of The Academy. However, a month later the faction splintered with Ayala returning to the IWA and the original members joining WWC. Angel's first non-wrestling appearance took place on June 2, 2012, as part of a WWC card held in Ponce, where they issued an open challenge to anyone in the roster. He made his in-ring debut on the first day of the Summer Madness tour, winning a contest over a midcarder. The following night, Angel defeated the incumbent WWC Universal Heavyweight Champion, Gilbert Cruz, by disqualification in a non-title bout that headlined Summer Madness' main show. In the opening night of the Aniversario 2012 series, he defeated José "Black Pain" Torres by pinfall. The following night Angel earned a victory over Ring of Honor's employee and former heavyweight champion, Davey Richards. After performing on the winning side of two tag team matches, he defeated Germán Figueroa, who had since won the Universal Heavyweight Championship. Angel was also victorious in a rematch, this time by countout. He suffered his first WWC defeat by being pinned by Figueroa in a three-way match. In his following appearance Angel lost his first singles match to Gilbert, continuing a feud by defeating him in a rematch. Former Universal and Undisputed Champion, Alex "Lightning" Cruz was responsible for his second loss. Afterwards he issued an open challenge, that resulted in three squash victories over jobbers and midcard talents. Angel went on to form an alliance with José "Chicky Starr" Laureano, who served as his manager and advisor. In his next appearance, he failed to win a match against reigning Universal Heavyweight Champion, Andy Levine. At Halloween Wrestling Xtravaganza, Angel defeated Samson Walker in the beginning of a feud. However, Walker won the following two rematches including one at Lockout 2012, only to lose their next showdown at Euphoria 2013. Afterwards, Angel performed some time performing in the tag team division, joining Filipo and Ayala with mixed results against the team of Thunder and Lightning. After defeating several jobbers and Walker, he was involved in a brief feud with "El Super Fénix", which was actually a masked Gilbert. At La Hora de la Verdad 2013, Angel lost to El Super Fénix in a hair vs. mask contest. The following month, he defeated Cotto. During this time frame, a second masked Super Fénix began aiding Gilbert during his presentations. In May, El Super Fénix #2 attacked González after a successful defense of the Universal Heavyweight Championship over Gilbert, after which he willingly unmasked himself revealing that Angel's in the stipulation match had been staged to ward off suspicion. This placed him in a feud for the title, in which he quickly became the first contender by winning a non-title bout. On May 11, 2013, Angel defeated González with the help of his new manager Julio "Barrabás" López to win the Universal Heavyweight Championship. During the following weeks he successfully defended the title in rematches, leading to a "last chance" match for González that finished with a disqualification. Angel lost the title to TNT at Crossfire on November 16, 2013.

=== Return to wrestling (2015–present) ===
On May 30, 2015, Angel appeared as a guest on Gilbert's 'Gilbert's Corner', where he announced his intentions of challenging the WWL World Heavyweight Champion Alberto 'El Patrón'. Gilbert challenged Chris Angel to an arm wrestling match, which ended with the Gentlemen's Club treacherously attacking Angel.

== Championships and accomplishments ==
- International Wrestling Association
  - IWA Undisputed World Heavyweight Championship (1 time)
  - IWA Intercontinental Championship (1 time)
  - Winner of the 6th José Miguel Pérez Memorial Cup (2011)
  - PRwrestling.com Rookie of the Year
- Pro Wrestling Illustrated
  - PWI ranked him #173 of the top 500 singles wrestlers in the PWI 500 in 2013
- World Wrestling Council
  - WWC Universal Heavyweight Championship (1 time)
- Pro Wrestling Illustrated
  - PWI ranked #173 of the top 500 singles wrestlers in the PWI 500 in 2013

== See also ==
- Professional wrestling in Puerto Rico
