= Mike Mendoza (wrestler) =

Puerto Rican wrestler (born 1990)

- Mendoza in May 2017

Personal information
- Born: Víctor Ortiz Jr. October 15, 1990 (age 35) Bayamón, Puerto Rico

Professional wrestling career
- Ring name(s): Enigma; Mike Mendoza
- Billed height: 6 ft 2 in (1.88 m)
- Billed weight: 215 lb (98 kg)
- Trained by: Savio Vega; El Vikingo
- Debut: 2009

Víctor Ortiz Jr. (born October 15, 1990), better known by the ring name Mike Mendoza, is a Puerto Rican professional wrestler.

Early in his career he worked as Enigma (stylized as Eni?ma), continuing to perform under the name for some time afterwards. Ortiz began his career in the International Wrestling Association (IWA) as a cruiserweight, winning the division's title before ascending to the lower mid-tier and later performing in the tag team division and winning the EWO World Tag Team Championship in an interpromotional angle with the large independent promotion Extreme Wrestling Organization (EWO).

In 2013, he debuted in the World Wrestling Council (WWC), where he reigned in the junior heavyweight and tag team divisions before concluding his stay following a run with the second-tier WWC Puerto Rico Heavyweight Championship. In 2017, Ortiz joined Liga Wrestling (then known as the World Wrestling League), where he is a two-time WWL World Heavyweight Champion.

== Professional Wrestling career ==
=== International Wrestling Association (2010–2012) ===
To begin his career, Ortiz adopted the gimmick of "Enigma", initially wrestling under a mask. On March 20, 2010, he debuted in the International Wrestling Association (IWA), winning his contest in the first round of a tournament to determine the first contender of the cruiserweight-based Xtreme Combat Division. On June 26, 2010, he competed in a royal rumble for the 5th José Miguel Pérez Cup being the tenth eliminated competitor. On that same event, Ortiz unsuccessfully challenged for the XCD Championship. On March 5, 2011, the IWA's president Miguel Pérez, Jr. declared that since the XCD Champion had vacated the title due to injury, a four-way match would take place at Juicio Final, but for the traditional IWA Cruiserweight Championship. On March 19, 2011, Ortíz lost a contest to Dennis Rivera.

On June 4, 2011, Ortiz won the IWA Cruiserweight Championship. During his reign, the IWA decided to drop the division. This decision was explained in story line, when a now more muscular Ortiz explained that he had surpassed the constraints of a cruiserweight division, choosing instead to create a new championship and become the self-proclaimed "IWA Television Champion". At Halloween Mayhem 2011, he defeated a jobber using an inverted neck breaker. At Histeria Boricua, he participated in a tournament for the Television Championship, winning two contests but losing the final to Carlos Cupules. At Kaos and Odissey, Ortiz surprised by aiding his former adversary in a title defense and joining him to form a team known as Controversial Inc. or Los Controversiales. On February 25, 2012, he and Cupules entered an interpromotional angle that had been running between the IWA and the Extreme Wrestling Organization (EWO) since December 2011. In their debut in EWO, they captured the EWO World Tag Team Championship and promptly rebranded them as the “You Tú Tag Team Championship”. They held the titles until May, when Doom Patrol won it in a three-way match that included Los Sorprendentes Lights. Afterwards, Los Controversiales remained involved in the title picture.

=== Independent circuit (2012–2013) ===
After the IWA entered a hiatus, Ortiz continued performing in the local independent circuit as part of Los Controversiales along Cupeles. In July they appeared at the Puerto Rico/Panama based International Gladiators Wrestling Alliance (IGWA), self-proclaiming themselves tag team champions. During the second half of 2012, EWO became involved in a charity campaign known as Ponte Pa’ lo +, which was turned into an angle after several of the wrestlers involved were attacked by masked “negative” counterparts. Team Positivo and Team Negativo clashed throughout the following months. On December 15, 2012, the heels lost their masks in a bet between both teams, revealing their identity as Ortiz, Cupeles, Real Michael, Two Face, Joseph Cruz “J.C.” Navarro and Oscar Anderson. Joined by the latter, the three became known as Los Realengos and issued a challenge in January 2013, which was accepted by Spider and Jason Sparks. The team feuded with Los Sorprendentes Lights during this timeframe. On April 13, 2013, they were forced to leave the promotion following a “loser leaves town” against the Lights and Rapero JP.

=== World Wrestling Council (2013–2017) ===
His 2014 campaign earned him the "Most Improved Wrestler" award from Puerto Rico Wrestling, which is determined by popular vote. In 2016, he was voted "Most Improved Wrestler" for the second time in the PRW awards.

=== World Wrestling League (2017–2019) ===
On May 11, 2017, WWL aired a segment where Mendoza overheard a conversation between Mr. 450 and Konnan, members of an invading faction known as La Junta de Control (lit. "The Control Board", a reference to PROMESA). After the former rebelled against the latter in a face turn and was jumped by the rest of the group, Ortiz made the save accompanied by Angel Fashion (who had left WWC shortly before him) and the three then made an alliance with the stable known as Westside Mafia to oppose the invaders. Having been jumped by La Junta for failing to win the WWL World Heavyweight Championship, Mr. 450 became the unofficial leader of this coalition. Both debutants were unable to attend WWL's next card due to pre-existing arrangements to participate in Cleveland Knights Championship Wrestling's (CKCW) Vanished Empire event, where he faced Matt Justice. Instead, the promotion ran an angle were the leader of the Puro Macho stable and La Junta's COO, Manny Ferno, visited his grandfather's gym and attacked his brother, Christian Ortiz, who was training to become a wrestler.

On June 24, 2017, Mendoza made his in-ring debut by defeating Puro Macho member "J.C." Navarro, but the group once again attacked his brother and broke one of his arms as part of the storyline. In his second appearance at CKCW, Mendoza teamed with Pérez in a loss to the team known as Stateline. Growing increasingly frustrated, Ferno requested the intervention of one of Konnan's stables, Impact Wrestling's Latin American Exchange. Mendoza and Pérez, now collectively known as La Tercera Generación, defeated the unified Global Force Wrestling/Impact Wrestling World Tag Team Champions Ángel Ortiz and Mike Draztic in the first confrontation between groups. On July 15, 2017, 450 defeated Joseph Cruz "J.C." Navarro in a first contenders match, stole the WWL World Heavyweight Championship belt and rebranded himself the Mecha Wolf 450, in the process turning on the faces.

After months of hiatus caused by hurricane Maria, WWL returned with Juicio Final in April 2018, where Mendoza teamed with Vargas in a loss to La Hermandad. By May 2018, Tercera Generación had become involved in a series for the World Tag Team Championship against Primos Meléndez and titlists Westside Mafia, coming up short in their opportunities. Interested in the WWL World Heavyweight Championship, Mendoza attacked both the incumbent Mecha Wolf 450 and surprise challenger BJ. As both members expressed titular ambitions, frictions became evident among Tercera Generación, notably at War in the West 2018. In Destino Final 2018, Mendoza suffered a fibula fracture during a three-way match (which included both his teammate and new champion BJ) for the WWL World Heavyweight Championship.

Following surgery and therapy, he made his return in January 2019. While Tercera Generación was still trying to work out their internal differences, Mendoza was attacked by BJ. He pursued revenge later in the event, but his intervention in a titular match also angered Fashion. After BJ retained, Mendoza attacked the incumbent, only to be jumped by new arrival Mighty Ursus. On March 15, 2019, he became the first contender for the World Heavyweight Championship by defeating the latter as part of Todo o Nada. Later in the event, Mendoza turned on Fashion by costing his tag team partner the last titular opportunity that he would have until the title changed hands.

A title shot was scheduled, and later signed, for Apuesta Letal on May 17, 2019, where BJ retained. Mendoza was then pushed to the background as an underling of a mysterious adviser to the heels simply known as “El Conciliario”, who gave him tasks through Tommy Diablo. On June 15, 2019, Mendoza won the World Heavyweight Championship due to outside intervention. For War in the West 2019, he teamed with Thunder and Lightning in a loss to BJ, Justin Dynamite and Star Roger. The identity of the adviser was revealed to be El Bronco, but his role atop the heel stable was short lived, since Diablo led them in a rebellion. Despite being reduced to a secondary role and being hounded by an unknown masked assailant, Mendoza scored successful defenses over Roger (twice, in regular and iron man matches) and Justin Dynamite. At Insurrection, he lost the title against a returning Fashion (revealed to have been the mysterious figure), failing to recapture it at La Revancha. On November 15, 2019, Mendoza closed the year with a win over Navarro at Guerra de Poder, since Black Xmas was later cancelled.

=== Liga Wrestling (2020) ===
In the final event held under the WWL brand after the promotion rebranded to Liga Wrestling, El Fin, Mendoza won a three-way match over Fashion and BJ to win his second World Heavyweight Championship. However, he dropped the title to Star Roger before the show was over.

=== Abroad and Latin American Wrestling Entertainment (2017–present) ===
After all activity in the local wrestling scene entered a hiatus following Hurricane Maria, he focused on expanding his career internationally. In October 2017, Ortiz spent a week at WWE's Performance Center and participated in the promotion's fall tryouts. The following week, the debut of both members of Tercera Generación at The Crash was announced. However, it never formalized, with Konnan leaving the promotion for Aro Lucha shortly afterwards. Instead, Ortiz participated in CKCW's anniversary show where "Sensacional" Roger Díaz retained the heavyweight championship of local independent promotion CWA in a fatal four-way match. In the interim, he made an appearance for NEW (an independent promotion organized by WWL co-worker Nelmarie "Roxxy" Tirado) defeating one of his students, the posh masked wrestler known as El Gentil. While the larger companies remained in a hiatus, Ortiz made an appearance in the season closer of CWA, where he attacked Díaz and in subsequent skits between both a challenge was issued.

His 2017 campaign earned him the awards for "Revelation of the Year" and "Match of the Year" (for Tercera Generación's match with LAX), this time by Impacto Estelar's panel of local bookers, former wrestlers and administrative personnel. Ortiz was the wrestler that appeared in most categories, also gathering votes in "Wrestler of the Year" and "Best (Strong Style) Striker".

CKCW acquired the rights to organize the match for the CWA World Heavyweight Championship for its New World Rising event held at Parma, Ohio on February 9, 2018. There, Roger retained the title, but was attacked by Tercera Generación afterwards. At CKCW, the three members of Tercera Generación became part of The Holy Fashion, a stable that began in the independent circuit of Florida and originally consisted of Fashion, El Nazareno and Carlos Cupeles. They began a list of "#Blessed" wrestlers, which compiled those laid out by the group. At CKCW, the remaining two members of Tercera Generación became part of The Holy Fashion. The group began a list of "Hall of #Blessed" wrestlers, which compiled those laid out by the group. Roger Díaz and Justin Dynamite (Jonathan Merced) were its inaugural members in this event. On May 20, 2018, Mendoza and Fashion (now rebranded as La Marea) defeated Thunder and Lightning to win the CKCW Tag Team Championship.

In July 2018, Mendoza made a return to IGWA in Kingdom of Champions, being paired against BJ. Following months of inactivity caused by injury, Mendoza made his first international appearance of 2019 at Mucha Lucha Atlanta's Katastrofe 2K19, once again appearing as part of La Anexión. This was followed by a return to CKWK, where Tercera Generación reunited to defend their titles against La Rebelión Amarilla. During the summer, he joined Fashion to face the Lucha Brothers in representation of La Anexión as part of MLA19 Dystopia. Mendoza's final abroad appearance of the year took place on December 6, 2019, at CKCW's Obliteration, where La Marea faced Star Roger and BJ.

In 2021, Mendoza signed with Latin American Wrestling Entertainment LAWE a company owned by Orlando Colón and his father José Colón. While in LAWE he had matches against Pedro Portillo III and formed a ta team with Angel Fashion called La Anexion.

== Championships and accomplishments ==
- Cleveland Knights Championship Wrestling
  - CKCW Tag Team Championship (1 time) - with Angel Fashion
- Espiritu Pro Wrestling Dojo
  - EPWD Championship (1 time)
- Extreme Wrestling Organization
  - EWO World Tag Team Championship (1 time) - with Sr. C
- International Wrestling Association
  - IWA Cruiserweight/Television Championship (1 time)
  - IWA World Tag Team Championship (1 time) - with Justin Cotto
- Pro Wrestling Illustrated
  - PWI ranked him #313 of the top 500 singles wrestlers in the PWI 500 in 2016
- World Wrestling Council
  - WWC Puerto Rico Championship (2 times)
  - WWC Junior Heavyweight Championship (1 time)
  - WWC World Tag Team Championship (4 times) - with El Hijo de Ray González (1) and El Cuervo (3)
- World Wrestling League
  - WWL World Heavyweight Championship (2 times)

== Luchas de Apuestas record ==
Winner (wager)	Loser (wager)	Location	Event	Date	Notes
Androide 787 (hair)	Mike Mendoza (hair)	San Juan, Puerto Rico	EPWD show	February 19, 2023	

== Personal life ==
Ortiz is a third generation wrestler, with his grandfather being Salvadoran legend Salvador Pérez "El Vikingo", who wrestled in Puerto Rico while competing with WWC (then Capitol Sports Promotions) during the 1980s and 1990s. Born in Bayamón, Puerto Rico to Victor Ortiz Sugrañes, Sr. and Brenda Negrón, being one of five siblings born to the patriarch, along Christian, Manuel Alejandro, Camila and Sergio. He is also the father of Víctor III (with Margieliz Fortis) and Victoria (with Kendra Castro). His grandfather performed throughout Latin America before arriving to WWC, where he worked as a wrestler, referee and villainous manager. Upon retiring, he established a gymnasium, Vikingo Power Gym, which was affiliated to the IWA during the 2000-10s and hosted the defunct Savio Vega Wrestling Academy, which served as the promotion's main developmental school, being managed by Juan "Savio Vega" Rivera. Ortiz, a medalist in the Liga Atlética Interuniversitaria de Puerto Rico as an amateur wrestler, began training there interested in following the family's trade.

Nowadays, Ortiz (who also has a background in Brazilian jiu-jitsu) works as a personal trainer in Definition Elite Fitness. Having previously worked as a trainer in a professional wrestling school based in his grandfather's Vikingo Power Gym, he opened the Espíritu Pro Wrestling Dojo in 2018, where additional seminars are hosted by international talents. Among his alumni is Olympic silver medalist Jaime Espinal, who was approached by WWE after beginning his classes. Ortiz has continued training the freestyle wrestler since then, preparing him for a tryout held in March 2017 and afterwards.
