= Gilbert (wrestler) =

Puerto Rican professional wrestler (born 1976)

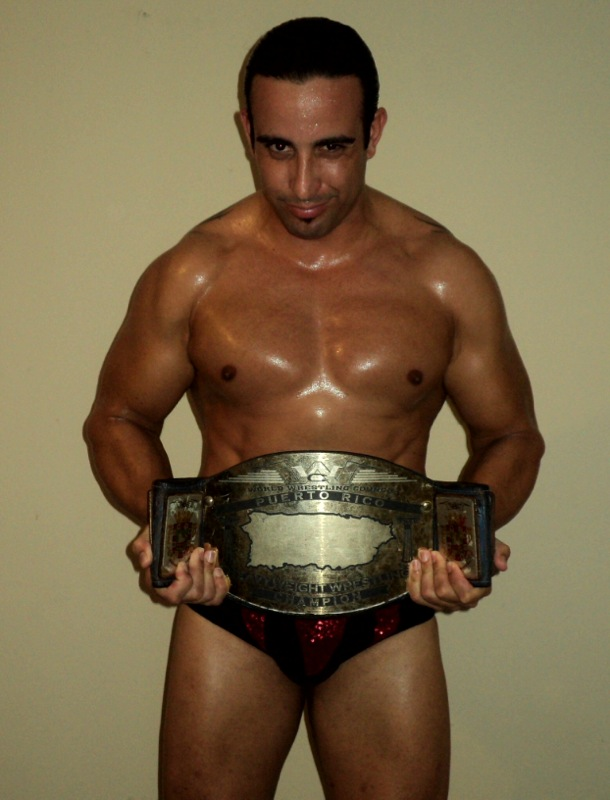
- Gilbert as the WWC Puerto Rico Heavyweight Champion

Personal information
- Born: Gilberto Cruz; November 12, 1976 (age 50) Bayamón, Puerto Rico

Professional wrestling career
- Ring name(s): Gilbert; El Super Medico; El Super Fenix
- Billed height: 6 ft 2 in (1.88 m)
- Billed weight: 235 lb (107 kg)
- Billed from: Puerto Rico
- Trained by: Savio Vega
- Debut: 2009

Gilberto Cruz (born November 12, 1976), better known as Gilbert, is a Puerto Rican professional wrestler and former baseball umpire. He debuted in the International Wrestling Association (IWA), where he won the first two championships of his career. In August 2010, he joined the World Wrestling Council, entering an angle with Ray González, which evolved in a general feud against all those that are considered cornerstone wrestlers in Puerto Rico. This advanced to a highly publicized contest against José Huertas González at Aniversario 2011. Gilbert later led Team WWC in an invasion against the IWA in July 2011. On October 10, 2014, he defeated Carlito to win his fourth WWC Puerto Rico Heavyweight Championship.

== Career ==
=== International Wrestling Association (2009–2010) ===
Cruz was born in Bayamón, Puerto Rico, where he completed his high school education at Rexville Superior in 1994. After wrestling in the independent circuit as part of a team known as The Rutgers, he was first brought to the International Wrestling Association as a face. His first feud was against "Ravishing" Richard Rondón who assaulted Gilbert, who was planted in the crowd. The angle was elaborated when Rondón insulted his wife, prompting several run-ins which saw him being expelled from the events due to being "an unlicensed fan". Eventually, a match was set between both, marking his official in-ring debut. He remained active in the midcard during the following months, until he joined "La Compañia" the predominant heel faction initially led by Savio Vega and subsequently by Joe Bravo, adopting the "Future Hall of Fame (Inductee)" gimmick, which saw him win the IWA World Tag Team Championship. As this character he began feuding with multiple champions, including the IWRG "Rey de Reyes" holder, Ricky Cruz. At Juicio Final 2010, he was pinned to lose the tag team championship. Outside of performing, he created a public campaign promoting education. During the final months of his participation in the IWA, Gilbert won the IWA Intercontinental Heavyweight Championship, dropping the belt before leaving the promotion.

=== World Wrestling Council (2010–2014) ===
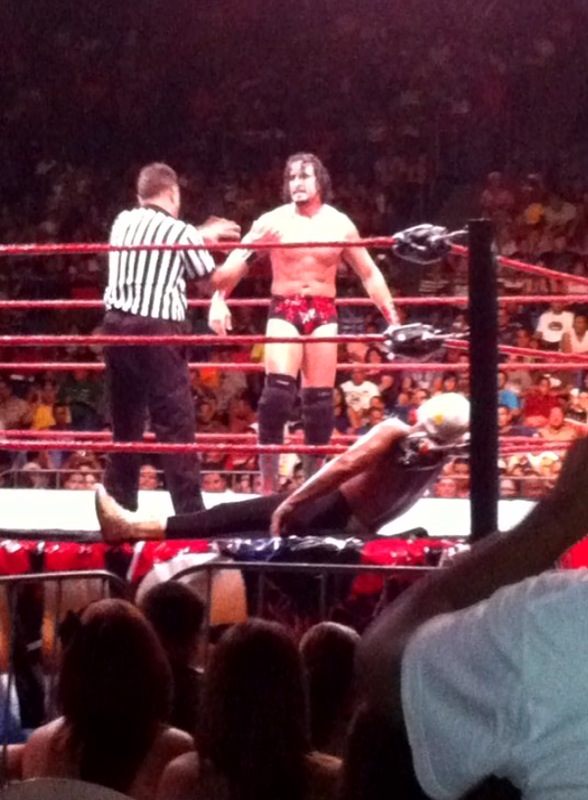
Gilbert vs. Huertas González at Aniversario 2011

On July 31, 2010, Gilbert debuted in the World Wrestling Council, interfering in a match and costing Ray González the WWC Universal Heavyweight Championship. He continued performing under his real name, but his character evolved into one based on Terry Benedict from the Ocean's Eleven trilogy franchise due to his physical similarity to Andy García. During the following weeks, an angle was run where he would pursue González while prompting the public to "burn the past". For his in-ring debut, Gilbert issued an open challenge, defeating jobbers in consecutive contests. However, his first storyline was left inconclusive when González left the company. Due to this outcome, Joe Bravo was brought in to the promotion, beginning a feud between both due to Gilbert's "inability to follow orders". This went on to numerous matches between both, including a tie at Septiembre Negro for the first contendership to the Universal Heavyweight Championship. However, the animosity between both was subsequently dropped and a pseudo-partnership emerged occasionally. In November 2010, Gilbert won his first title in the promotion, the WWC Puerto Rico Heavyweight Championship from "El Sensacional" Roger Carlitos Díaz, which he retained for several months. The feud between both extended to Lockout 2010, closing the year. On February 27, 2011, WWC launched a talk show titled "La Opinión de Gilbert", where he began hosting retired or otherwise established wrestlers. He continued his alliance with Bravo, helping him retain the Caribbean Heavyweight Championship. In March 2011, Gilbert assaulted Julio Estrada in a live edition of "La Opinión de Gilbert", adopting a pattern that included similar attacks against "Invader #3" Johhny Rivera, "El Profe" Ángel Pantoja Rivera, Jesús Castillo, Jr., Rubén "Hercules Ayala" Cruz, "Invader 4" Maelo Huertas and Carlos Colón.

In April 2011, he entered a feud with Shane Sewell, from which he emerged with the Puerto Rico Heavyweight Championship. Both wrestlers were included in a 4- man gauntlet match for the vacant Universal Heavyweight Championship, but were uninvolved in the outcome. Eventually, Gilbert hosted Díaz, who after being attacked, decided to bring José Huertas González back from his retirement. At Summer Madness 2011, he retained the championship, defeating World Wrestling Entertainment superstar, Eddie Colón In this event the feud with Huertas González began official, with Gilbert attacking him with a folding chair. An official match was scheduled for Aniversario 2011. In the meantime, Gilbert wrestled Díaz in grudge matches. The contract signing for Aniversario concluded in the revelation that José Laureano would be the special referee. During the weeks leading to the event, Gilbert's push continued, with him defeating members of the midcard while receiving assistance from Laureano. The contest was heavily promoted by WWC, with both wrestlers making appearances in television and radio stations. The first contest between them took place in a tag team match, where Huertas González and Díaz won by pinning Gilbert's partner, Laureano. The main match between both was left inconclusive, seeing intervention from Huertas González's family.

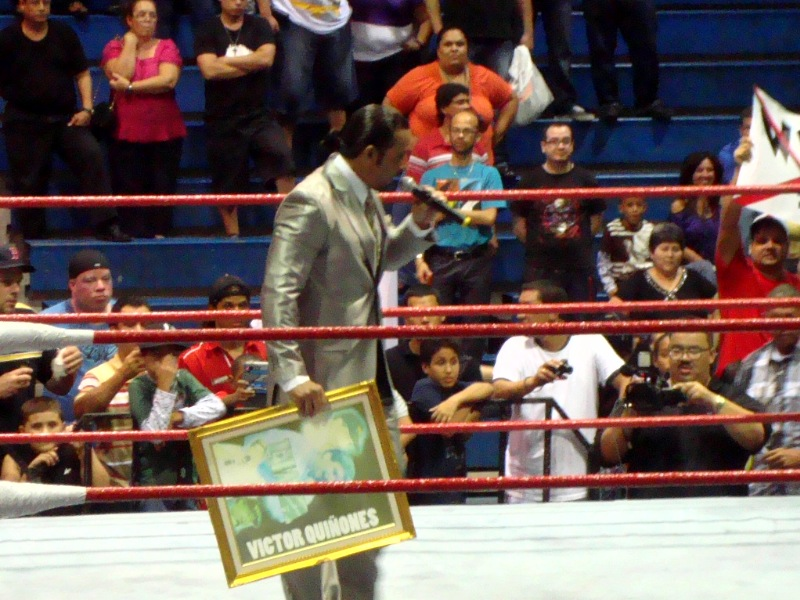
Gilbert interrupts Quiñones' Hall of Fame induction

On July 17, 2011, the IWA and WWC began an interpromotional angle, the first between both, where IWA wrestlers entered the ring at WWC Aniversario 2011 and issued a challenge. Two weeks later, Gilbert led Team WWC in retaliation, interrupting a ceremony where Víctor Quiñones was being inducted into the Puerto Rico Professional Wrestling Hall of Fame. After taking main stage during the act, he proceeded to cut a promo where he claimed that Quiñones was undeserving of being a Hall of Famer and adding more insults. This led to Team IWA's reaction, who issued a challenge to the Colón family, which was promptly accepted by Team WWC. Following two successful title defenses, the feud with Huertas González was resumed, costing him the title by forfeit, recovering it when Díaz decided to vacate due to dissatisfaction with the manner that it was won. The day after, Gilbert began pursuing the Universal Heavyweight Championship defeating the incumbent, Carly Colón. At Septiembre Negro, he won a lumberjack match against Huertas González, which counted with several former champions and veteran wrestlers surrounding the ring. A third contest ended in similar fashion. This closed this angle, with Gilbert going on to demand the title opportunity that he won by defeating Colón. On October 30, 2011, he defended the first contendership defeating Chris Masters. His first titular opportunity ended in a no contest, after Colón assaulted two different referees. A week before Lockout, Gilbert decided not to challenge for the title in that event, instead choosing yo feud with a returning González. However, he was booked to defend his first confedership against Kenny Dykstra.

Gilbert lost the contest due to outside interference from González, responding later in the event by assaulting him with a chair. González won the first contest between them at Euphoria 2012. At La Hora de la Verdad, Gilbert won a rematch to regain the first contendership, following intervention from Orlando Toledo on his behalf and using a folded chair. Toledo also worked as the advisor of the Extreme Wrestling Organization, the largest independent promotion in Puerto Rico, which was also holding an interpromotional angle with IWA concurrently. On February 22, 2012, Gilbert vacated the Puerto Rico Heavyweight Championship in anticipation for Noche de Campeones, where he would employ his Universal Championship opportunity. At the event, he turned on Laureano and officially made Toledo his manager. To close Noche de Campeones, Gilbert defeated Colón to win the Universal Heavyweight Championship. At Camino a la Gloria 2012, he retained the title by losing via disqualification in a rematch against Colón. Concurrently, Pro Wrestling Illustrated ranked him ninth in their International ranking. Gilbert was subsequently involved in two short programs involving Roberto Rubio and Richard Filipo, emerging from both with the title. On June 9, 2012, his Aniversario 2012 opponent was announced, former world champion Germán Figueroa. On the opening night of the Summer Madness tour, Gilbert lost to González in a non-title match. The following night, he lost to Chris Angel, who had just joined WWC after the becoming the only wrestler to win the IWA Undisputed World Heavyweight Championship undefeated. In the opening show of Aniversario 2012, he lost a non-title contest to Orlando Colón. The following night, Gilbert dropped the Universal Heavyweight Championship to Figueroa. He closed Aniversario with a victory over Shelton Benjamin. After winning a non-title rematch over Figueroa, Gilbert continued active by gathering wins over midcard talents. He then entered a feud with Angel, trading victories. At Septiembre Negro, Gilbert participated in a three-way elimination match, but was expelled from the heel stable upon being pinned. He closed the event by emerging from the public to defend the faces from an assault led by Colón and Thunder and Lightning. Gilbert then joined Ray González to feud with Thunder and Lightning, gathering mixed results.

At Halloween Wrestling Xtravaganza, he teamed with German Figueroa (Apolo)for the first time to wrestle Thunder and Lightning. However, German Figueroa (Apolo) costed them the match and left him alone in the ring. At WWC 40 Aniversario, he was defeated by Ray Fenix, unmasked him. On January 19, 2013, Gilbert defeated Apolo to win the Puerto Rican championship.

On December 15, 2013, he announced that he was leaving WWC. Despite this announcement, he reached an agreement with the promotion during the winter offseason and was booked to appear at Euphoria 2014, losing a contest to Orlando Colón. During the second night of the event he entered a feud with Germán Figueroa and after their first encounter ended in a draw, Gilbert won a rematch to win the Puerto Rico Heavyweight Championship. On October 25, 2014, at Aniversario 41, Gilbert lost the title against Chicano. On October 10, 2014, Gilbert defeated Carlito Caribbean Cool to win the Puerto Rican Championship. However, he regained the title on November 8, 2014.

=== Fighting Spirit Wrestling (2011–2012) ===
Gilbert's international debut took place on December 9, 2011, at Fighting Spirit Wrestling's debut event Immortals Holidays, competing in a four-way main event against Shane Douglas, Homicide and Sami Callihan. Gilbert won the contest, becoming the first FSW World Heavyweight Champion. His first title defense was programmed for February 25, 2012, with his opponent being Chavo Guerrero. Gilbert retained following a piledriver and participated in a post-match beatdown on Guerrero that included two other wrestlers. On May 26, 2012, he reappeared in FSW by competing in a 3-on-3 contest. On August 22, 2012, Gilbert headlined FSW's first event in Atlantic City, titled Boardwalk Empire. The main event was the same of Aniversario 2012, featuring a rematch between him and Figueroa for the FSW World Heavyweight Championship. Gilbert emerged from the card still holding the title. Gilbert lost the FSW World Title after he was stripped of the title by FSW for no-showing a Fighting Spirit Wrestling event which made the title vacant which was later won by the "Funky Monkey" Angel Ortiz.

=== World Wrestling League (2014–2015) ===
On December 13, 2014, Gilbert left WWC and made his debut in the World Wrestling League, where he served as a surprise challenger to WWL World Heavyweight Champion Shane Sewell. After winning the title with underhanded tactics, the decision was reversed and the match concluded in a disqualification. Originally brought in by Savio Vega, he turned on the former and joined the heel faction known as The Gentlemen's Club. Gilbert was then relegated in the rankings and lost a bid to become the first contender to Germán Figueroa. Afterwards, he participated in an arm wrestling contest against the debuting Chris Angel, assaulting him along several of his allies. Shortly afterwards, Gilbert announced his intention of pursuing the new World Champion, Alberto "El Patrón" del Rio. After weeks of backstage confrontation, he defeated Angel in a street fight at Sin Piedad. Later that evening, Gilbert joined the rest of The Gentlemen's Club and turned on Negrín, with the group adopting José Chaparro as its new leader.

After a title match between Banderas and Del Rio was announced for Wrestlefest, Gilbert made an announcement where he noted that the envelope granting him a match against the champion at any time was still in his possession. In the weeks leading to the event and after a backstage segment placed him at odds with Banderas, he was officially announced as the special referee for the encounter. While officiating at Wretlefest, Gilbert tried to cash in his opportunity after suddenly using knuckle brasses to steal the pin, but Del Rio interrupted this attempt, which led to the title being held up. Later in the same event, he lost a dog collar match to Chris Angel after Banderas distracted him.

Return to World Wrestling Council (2015-present)

After of leave WWL, Gilbert his return to WWC. In February 2025, he was fired by Eddie Colón, then in April he was appointed WWC Management Advisor after signing a new contract with the company.

== Championships and accomplishments ==
- Fighting Spirit Wrestling
  - FSW World Heavyweight Championship (1 time)
- International Wrestling Association
  - IWA Intercontinental Championship (1 time)
  - IWA World Tag Team Championship (2 times) - with Rick Stanley
- World Wrestling Council
  - WWC Universal Heavyweight Championship (4 times)
  - WWC Puerto Rico Heavyweight Championship (8 times)
  - WWC World Tag Team Championship (2 times) - with Pedro Portillo III (1) and Intelecto 5 Estrellas (1)
  - WWC Caribbean Heavyweight Championship (1 time)
- Wrestling Superstar
  - 1st MysterioManía Monster's Cup (2018)

=== Luchas de Apuestas record ===
Winner (wager)	Loser (wager)	Location	Event	Date	Notes
Gilbert (career)	Ray González (career)	Bayamón, Puerto Rico	WWC Noche De Campeones	June 29, 2019	
