= Robert Davis =

Robert Davis may refer to:

== Arts and entertainment ==
- DJ Screw (1971–2000), rap DJ and inventor of "Screwed" music
- Robert Davis, the real name of comedian Jasper Carrott (born 1945)
- Robert Hobart Davis (1869–1942), American dramatist, journalist, and photographer
- Robert P. Davis (1929–2005), American author and screenwriter
- Robert Tyler Davis (1904–1978), American art historian

== Law ==
- Robert E. Davis (judge) (1939–2010), Kansas Supreme Court Justice
- Robert Grimes Davis (1819–1872), Kingdom of Hawaii Supreme Court Justice
- Robert N. Davis (born 1953), judge of the United States Court of Appeals for Veterans Claims

== Military ==
- Robert Davis (RAF officer) (born 1930), British air marshal
- Robert Courtney Davis (1876–1944), officer in the United States Army

== Politics ==
- Robert Atkinson Davis (1841–1903), Premier of Manitoba, 1874–1878
- Robert Lee Davis (1893–1967), U.S. Representative from the state of Pennsylvania
- Robert O. Davis (1910–1992), Pennsylvania politician
- Robert T. Davis (1823–1906), U.S. Representative from the state of Massachusetts
- Robert William Davis (1932–2009), U.S. Representative from the state of Michigan
- Robert Wyche Davis (1849–1929), U.S. Representative from the state of Florida
- Robert Davis (British politician) (born 1957), British Conservative Party politician

== Science and technology ==
- Robert Davis (inventor) (1870–1965), inventor in 1910 of a new model of oxygen rebreather, used to escape from submarines
- Robert E. Davis (climatologist), associate professor of climatology at the University of Virginia
- Robert B. Davis (1926–1997), American mathematician

== Others ==
- Butch Davis (outfielder, born 1916) (Robert Lomax Davis, 1916–1988), American baseball player
- Bobby Davis (wrestler) (Robert Davis, 1937–2021), American professional wrestling manager
- Robert Davis (New Orleans) (born 1941), who was beaten by three police officers in New Orleans shortly after Hurricane Katrina
- Robert R. Davis (born 1949), American economist and Commodity Futures Trading Commission commissioner
- Robert L. Davis (police chief) (born 1958), Chief in the San Jose Police Department
- Robert Davis (wide receiver) (born 1995), American football wide receiver
- Robert Davis (pole vaulter), winner of the 1958 NCAA DI outdoor pole vault championship

== See also ==
- Rob Davis (disambiguation)
- Bob Davis (disambiguation)
- Bert Davis (disambiguation)
- Robert Hartford-Davis (1923–1977), British born producer, director and writer
- Glenn Robert Davis (1914–1988), U.S. Representative from the state of Wisconsin
- Robert Davies (disambiguation)
