= Rob (given name) =

Rob is a masculine given name. It is often short for Robert or Robin. It may refer to:

- Rob Adams (architect) (born 1948), Australian architect and urban designer
- Rob Bailey (cricketer) (born 1963), English cricketer
- Rob Bailey (director), English television director
- Rob Bailey (musician), Australian musician
- Rob Beckett (born 1986), English stand-up comedian and presenter
- Rob Brown (disambiguation), multiple people
- Rob Brydon (born 1965), Welsh comedian, actor, radio and host of Would I Lie To You?, singer and impressionist
- Rob Burch (footballer) (born 1983), English retired football goalkeeper
- Rob Burch (politician) (born 1946), American politician
- Rob Cantor (born 1983), American singer-songwriter
- Rob Davies (disambiguation), multiple people
- Rob Davis (disambiguation), multiple people
- Rob Deer (born 1960), American baseball player
- Rob Dibble, former MLB pitcher and announcer
- Rob Dyrdek, American entrepreneur, actor, producer, reality TV personality, and former professional skateboarder.
- Robert Edwards (disambiguation), multiple people
- Rob Elliott, host of Wheel of Fortune Australia (1997–2003)
- Rob Ford (1969–2016), former Canadian politician and Toronto mayor
- Rob Gronkowski, American football player
- Rob Halford, heavy metal vocalist, lead singer for Judas Priest
- Rob Harley (born 1990), Scottish rugby union player
- Rob Havenstein, NFL player
- Rob Hopkins (born 1968), English activist and writer, founder of the Transition Towns movement
- Rob Houwer (1937–2025), Dutch film producer
- Rob Jacobs (born 1943), Dutch association football former player and manager
- Rob James (disambiguation), multiple people
- Rob Jetten (born 1987), Dutch politician
- Rob Johnson (disambiguation), multiple people
- Rob Kaminsky (born 1994), American major league baseball pitcher
- Rob Kardashian, American reality television star
- Rob Knox (1989–2008), British actor
- Rob Krimmel (born 1977), American basketball coach, current head coach for the Saint Francis University Red Flash
- Rob Lowe (born 1964), American actor and game show host
- Rob Manfred (born 1958), American businessman, lawyer, sports executive, and current commissioner of Major League Baseball
- Rob Mariano (born 1975), American reality television competitor, winner of Survivor: Redemption Island
- Rob McCord (born 1959), American politician
- Rob McElhenney (born 1977), American actor, producer and screenwriter
- Rob Moore (disambiguation), multiple people
- Rob Morris (American football) (born 1975), American former National Football League player
- Rob Morris (Freemason) (1818–1888), American poet and Freemason
- Rob Naismith (born 1971), Canadian racing driver
- Rob Nelson (born 1979), American biologist and documentary filmmaker
- Rob Nosse, American politician
- Rob Oppenheim (born 1980), American professional golfer
- Rob Palmer (disambiguation), multiple people
- Rob Parker (disambiguation), multiple people
- Rob Paulsen (born 1956), American voice actor
- Rob Pitts (1979–2024), American businessman
- Rob Portman, United States Senator
- Rob Refsnyder (born 1991), Korean-American baseball player
- Rob Reiner (1947–2025), American film director, producer, screenwriter and actor
- Rob Riggle, American actor, comedian, and host
- Rob Ryan, NFL coach
- Rob Scheller (born 1927), Dutch art historian
- Rob Schneider (born 1963), American actor, comedian, screenwriter and director
- Rob Senderoff (born 1973), American college basketball coach
- Rob Stewart (actor) (born 1961), Canadian actor
- Rob Stewart (filmmaker) (born 1979), Canadian filmmaker
- Rob Swearingen (born 1963), American politician
- Rob Thomas, American singer, songwriter, and multi-instrumentalist best known for being the lead singer of the rock band Matchbox Twenty
- Rob Valentino (born 1985), American soccer player
- Rob Vickers (born 1981), English rugby union player
- Rob Walker (disambiguation), multiple people
- Rob Warner (footballer) (born 1977), English retired footballer
- Rob Warner (mountain biker) (born 1970), English mountain biker, motocross rider and TV presenter
- Rob Watson (disambiguation), multiple people
- Rob Wilson (disambiguation), multiple people
- Rob Zombie (born 1965), American musician, film director, screenwriter and film producer
