= Pedro Morales =

Puerto Rican professional wrestler (1942–2019)

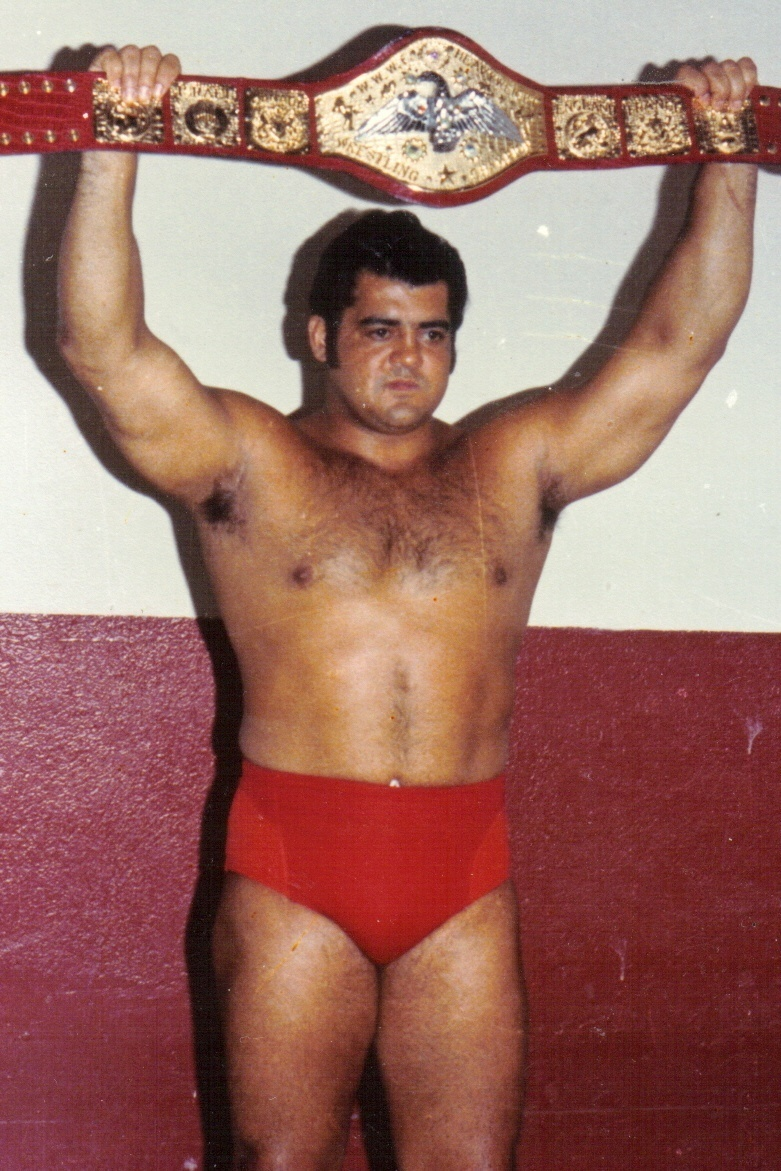
- Morales as the WWWF Heavyweight Champion in the 1970s

Personal information
- Born: Pedro Antonio Morales; October 22, 1942 Culebra, Puerto Rico
- Died: February 12, 2019 (aged 76) Perth Amboy, New Jersey, U.S.
- Spouse: Karen Morales (m. 1972)
- Children: 1

Professional wrestling career
- Ring name(s): John Kilonis; Johnny Como; Johnny Ricco; Pedro Morales
- Billed height: 5 ft 10 in (178 cm)
- Billed weight: 235 lb (107 kg)
- Billed from: Culebra, Puerto Rico
- Trained by: Barba Roja
- Debut: 1959
- Retired: 1987

Pedro Antonio Morales (October 22, 1942 – February 12, 2019) was a Puerto Rican professional wrestler. He is best known for his appearances in the United States with Worldwide Wrestling Associates (WWA) and the World Wide Wrestling Federation (WWWF).

Debuting in 1959, Morales originally came to prominence with WWA in the 1960s, where he held the World Heavyweight Championship and World Tag Team Championship. In 1970, he joined the WWWF, winning its World Heavyweight Championship and United States Championship. In a second run with the by-then World Wrestling Federation (WWF) in the 1980s, he won the Intercontinental Heavyweight Championship and Tag Team Championship, establishing himself as the promotion's first Triple Crown Champion. He retired from professional wrestling in 1987.

A popular champion, Morales had particular appeal to his native Puerto Ricans and the wider Latino audience. The first Latino to hold a world heavyweight championship, his reign as WWWF Heavyweight Champion remains among the longest in history. He previously also held the record for most cumulative days as Intercontinental Champion at 619 days across two reigns, having been surpassed by Gunther's one reign in February 2024. He was inducted into the WWF Hall of Fame in 1995, the Professional Wrestling Hall of Fame and Museum in 2015 and the Wrestling Observer Newsletter Hall of Fame in 2017.

== Early life ==
Morales was born on October 22, 1942, in the municipality of Culebra, an island off the shore of Puerto Rico's main island. He was a member of a large family, with 85 cousins just on his mother's side. Morales once said that 65 percent of Culebra's population had some bloodline connection to him. He was raised in Culebra throughout his childhood and remained there until reaching his adolescence, when his mother sent him to live with an aunt in Brooklyn, New York, to finish his high school education. It was there that one of his sister's friends introduced him to the members of a wrestling club which quickly earned his interest. After practicing in his school and at a local YMCA, Morales debuted as an amateur wrestler at the age of 13, competing in the 160 lb division. In New York, he also became a professional wrestling fan, witnessing the tag team of Miguel Pérez, Sr. and Antonino Rocca. Morales also played baseball. When he was 16 years old, he was selected in the Liga de Béisbol Profesional de Puerto Rico's (now known as Liga de Béisbol Profesional Roberto Clemente) first year draft by the Leones de Ponce. However, due to living outside of Puerto Rico, he declined the opportunity. Instead, Morales elected to train in order to become a professional wrestler, in the process gaining twenty pounds. A year later, his father signed the documentation required by the New York State Athletic Commission in order to begin his career as an underage performer.

== Professional wrestling career ==
=== Early career (1959–1965) ===
When he was 17 years old, Morales trained under Barba Roja to become a wrestler and participated on a card held in New York City in 1959. He debuted by earning a victory over Howard LaVine, who performed under the pseudonym Buddy Gilbert, going on to participate in tag team matches and other stipulation matches throughout the tri-state area the following year. During the next two years, he wrestled in Virginia and North Carolina, particularly in the towns of Petersburg, Virginia and Charlotte, North Carolina. Morales frequently wrestled fellow Puerto Rican Gypsy Joe on these cards. He also earned wins over Jimmy Quinn, Don Savage and Sonny Fargo, while wrestling several local figures such as Swede Hanson, Laverne Baxter and Tony Nero. The following year, Morales began visiting several more states, often teaming up with different Latin luchadores, such as Pepper Gonzales and Gory Guerrero, while holding loose feuds with a wrestler simply known as “The Viking” and Mark Starr. As a traveling performer, he amassed mixed results, with most of his victories taking place in British Columbia. While there, Morales defeated Tarzan Potvin, Tony Nero, Bud Rattal, Tommy O'Toole and Johnny Demchuk in a two-month period, before losing three challenges to Oliver Winrush. After a similar result in a short program with Hard Boiled Haggerty, he had two draws against Allan Garfield, before defeating him on July 16, 1962. Over the following months, Morales served as a mid-carder, losing to several of the high-card talents. However, he gained wins over jobbers such as Poncho Pico, Sputnik Monroe and Gypsy Biviano, the latter of whom he won a three-fall match .

The following August, Morales traveled to Texas and was involved in a series of matches with Jack and Jim Dalton, facing them along multiple tag team partners. After emerging victorious in a feud over Nelson Royal, he relocated to Washington, D.C., and Bridgeport, Connecticut, where he wrestled Miguel Torres, Angelo Savoldi and Lou Albano, while entering into a rivalry with Tony Altomare. It was there where he first teamed up with Miguel Pérez, Sr. and Argentina Apollo, who were the first tag team champions recognized in the history of the World Wide Wrestling Federation (WWWF, now known as WWE). In 1963, Morales performed in several tag team matches against Johnny Barend and Magnificent Maurice, returning to New York and New Jersey in a program alongside Gordo Chihuahua, who worked as enhancement talent. Later in the year, he formed a recurrent tag team with Perez and feuded with Pedro Rodriguez. In June, Morales joined Bruno Sammartino, Bobo Brazil, Perez and Apollo to once again enter a storyline with Johnny Barend, who was now joined by Diamond Jack. After this, Vittorio Apollo became his mainstay tag team partner, with whom he challenged The Fabulous Kangaroos, Johnny Barend and Buddy Rogers on several occasions. Morales finished the year by teaming with Pérez, earning three victories over the Fabulous Kangaroos. The team opened 1964 by feuding with Chris and John Tolos, losing the first two encounters but winning the three-fall rubber match. Individually, Morales defeated Chuck Martoni, Arnold Skaaland and Prince Nero several times.

The tag team next entered a feud with Jerry Graham and Luke Graham, losing multiple times before earning a win on September 19, 1964. The team also exchanged results against Hans & Max Mortier. During this time frame, Morales picked singles wins over Frank Hickey, Chuck Martoni, Bobby Davis, Arnold Skaaland, Humberto Mercado, Matt Gilmore, Boris Malenko, Klondike Bill, Jose Quinteras, Magnificent Maurice, Bull Johnson and Luke Graham, while losing in matches against Wild Red Berry and Freddie Blassie. Morales then entered a double feud against Pedro Rodriguez and Gene Kiniski, dominating Rodriguez but losing to Kiniski. Alongside Pérez, he restarted their feud with the Grahams, earning a second victory. In the final months of 1964, Morales also gained wins over Robert Duranton and Steve Stanlee.

=== Worldwide Wrestling Associates (1965–1968) ===
Morales opened 1965 by moving to Worldwide Wrestling Associates (WWA) in California, an organization that had been created as a mirror to the National Wrestling Alliance (NWA), where he engaged in multiple concurrent feuds, defeating "The Executioner" in his first match, before going on to defeat several wrestlers with similar characters by winning against "The Axeman" twice, "El Verdugo" and "The Hangman" on several occasions during the first three months of the year. Morales also experienced success in matches outside storyline, besting Jesse Rose, Charlie Kalani, Ruffy Colden, Billy Red Lyons, Kenny Yates, Don Savage, Luke Graham, Hard Boiled Haggerty, some of them more than two consecutive times. In March, he was involved in a program with Karl Von Stroheim, winning a series of matches against him and teaming with Mr. Moto and Luis Hernandez to win tag team matches that also included Kurt Von Stroheim.

On March 12, 1965, Morales defeated "The Destroyer" Dick Beyer to win the WWA World Heavyweight Championship in a three-fall match. He continued earning singles victories over Horst Wessel, Kurt Von Stroheim, Al Marshall, Broadway Venus, Bill Cody and in a rematch against The Destroyer, while teaming along Hernandez to wrestle multiple combinations. He became involved in a feud against The Assassins and The Butcher, steadily gaining the upper hands both individually and in tag matches. Morales moved on from these angles and defeated Rod Orell, Billy Klutzer and The Mummy, before dropping the championship to Luke Graham on July 23, 1965. Morales responded by defeating Graham in a three-fall chain match less than a month later, in the process winning a Brass Knuckles Championship. Meanwhile, his team with Hernandez won three consecutive matches against The Assassins by disqualification. Subsequently, a revival of his previous feuds with The Butcher and The Assassins became intertwined with the current involving Graham, leading to a series of matches featuring different combinations during the following months. Hernandez was eventually replaced by Adalberto Torres as Morales's tag team partner, along whom he also faced Gorilla Monsoon and a variety of partners. On October 17, 1965, he defeated Graham to regain the WWA World Heavyweight Championship. Morales went on to defeat Graham in two more rematches, scoring victories over Ox Anderson, Bandito Lopez and Jack Allen as well. Following a short series against El Mongol, he continued this pattern in matches involving Swede Karlsen, Baron Leone, Killer Karlson, The Golden Terror, Mark Lewin, Killer Karl Kox and Clyde Steeves. Morales also won a battle royale held in Fort Worth, Texas and brought closure to his feud with El Mongol by besting him on February 13, 1966. During this stage, he also changed tag team partners frequently, teaming with Better Boucher, Ramon Torres and Billy Red Lyons among others, gathering mixed results.

In the final months before making a tour to Japan, Morales defeated Mark Lewin and Indio Joe, but also lost to Lyons and Mark Lewin. At his first show in Tokyo, he had a draw against Don Lewin. Morales continued this run by defeating Michiaki Yoshimura, Yoshino Sato, Mr. Moto, Mitsu Hirai, Umanosuke Ueda, tying against Kim Il in all of their encounters and losing only to Giant Baba by countout in singles. During this run, he teamed with Arman Hussein, Lewin, Wilbur Snyder, Lonnie Mayne & Billy Two, among others, with the results being divided inequitable manner between wins, losses and draws. On May 27, 1966, Morales returned to California and went on another winning streak over Ray Shields, Jack Lanza, El Mongol, Stan Neilson, Baby Destroyer and Fritz Von Goering, before entering a series against Buddy Austin, losing the first three encounters and dropping the WWA World Heavyweight Championship to him on August 5, 1966, before winning the fourth match. He also reformed his tag team with Luis Hernandez, finding success in this division as well by winning the WWA World Tag Team Championship on June 24, 1966, being a dual champion for over a month. After a win over Art Mahalik, Morales wrestled Hernandez to a three-fall draw. This was followed by victories over Austin and in a second battle royale. Despite gathering singles wins over the likes of El Mongol, Austin, Magnificent Maurice, Joe Flores and Frank Marconi, during the following months, Morales focused on the tag team division, earning eleven wins, seven draws and only one loss before dropping the titles to Hard Boiled Haggerty and El Shereef on October 28, 1966. He subsequently split results against Shereef, also besting Rip Miller and Austin on several occasions during November. To close the year, Morales joined Mark Lewin to recapture the WWA World Tag Team Championship on December 10, 1966.

Morales began 1967 by also teaming with Ricky Romero, Mr. Moto and Pepper Gomez, gathering victories along all of them. In singles, he remained in the top of the card, defeating Paul Diamond, El Shereef, Killer Karl Kox, K.O. Murphy and Johnny Vander, while wrestling Haggerty and The Mad Russian to draws. After winning two more matches along Lewin, their team ceased to exist, costing them the titles. Morales was then joined by Romero as his partner, once again winning the WWA World Tag Team Championship along with him on February 10, 1967. The team went on to win almost a dozen matches, while he won contests against The Mighty Atlas, The Preacher and Mike DiBiase during the following months. Morales also ran a parallel team with Pepper Gomez, winning the American Wrestling Alliance World Tag Team Championship along with him after winning their two previous matches. He made his first appearance in Hawaiian territory along Gomez on April 26, 1967. After returning to California the following month, Morales entered a series against his former partner Mark Lewin, but lost both encounters. He then continued to team with Gomez and Romero, recording a successful run until they became part-time partners in July 1967, when he joined fellow Puerto Rican José Luis Rivera, immediately entering a long feud against Mike DiBiase, who teamed with a variety of wrestlers, but most frequently wrestled along Karl Gotch. While individually, Morales entered a brief period where he recorded more draws and losses than wins, his team with Rivera won their first five encounters, which also featured him besting DiBiase and Gotch in singles. Concurrent to this, his team with Romero began experiencing more losses, while the one along Gomez remained consistently successful. While DiBiase and Gotch won in two consecutive events, the feud began to produce several draws. Morales and Rivera won the last encounter on August 16, 1967, then migrating to another rivalry against Freddie Blassie & Buddy Austin. Despite earning wins over several other teams, they were unable to best Blassie and Austin during this feud, only recording a single win. Individually, Morales gained victories over Tony Nero and Tony Altomare, both of whom eventually teamed and lost to the Puerto Rican team.

He challenged and defeated Blassie by himself, but lost in a rematch. Morales wrestled Pat Patterson in two tag matches, losing along Rivera but winning with Gomez. The team with Rivera dissolved afterwards, with another teammate emerging in the figure of Antonio Pugliese. Both of Morales' teams managed to record a successful run against an assortment of teams that included different combinations of opponents such as Stan Stasiak, Tom Andrews, Blassie, Austin, Patterson and Ray Stevens among others. Meanwhile, in one-on-one competition he bested Ron Romano, Baron Mikel Scicluna, Rick Renaldo, The Rebel and won an eight-man battle royale. Morales closed the year by rejoining Gomez as a full-time partner, defeating the team of Blassie and The Great Malenko. To open 1968, he defeated The Preacher, The Rebel and Blassie, briefly rejoining Romero in a draw. Individually, Morales then entered a streak of draws, before rebounding with wins over Rick Renaldo, Rocky Montero, The Alaskan, Lou Anthony, Rocky Montero and The Masked Invader. Antonio Pugliese reappeared on May 4, 1968, only to drop the WWA World Tag Team Championship to The Medics. A week later, Morales and Gomez also lost the AWA World Tag Team Championship to Kinji Shibuya & Masa Saito, but regained them on June 8, 1968. Mil Máscaras became a new member of the team, whom he joined in winning a series against Jim Osborne and losing another to Blassie and Austin. Morales made a one-night appearance in Hawaii during the summer, besting Pat Patterson. Both of Morales teams began having mixed results, which brought in another winning streak as a singles wrestler which included names such as Fritz Von Goering, Texas, Osborne, Lou Anthony, Rick Renaldo, Thunderbolt Patterson, Tony Romano, Rocky Montaro and The Masked Invader before being snapped by Blassie via disqualification. On November 7, 1968, Morales challenged Gene Kiniski for the NWA World Heavyweight Championship, but failed to win the match. He won his next match by defeating George Cannon, forming a brief partnership with Hahn Lee that only lasted for a month. In his final matches for the WWA, Morales defeated The Raider and El Mongol twice.

=== 50th State Big Time Wrestling (1967–1970) ===
Now a full-time performer for 50th State Big Time Wrestling in Hawaii, he quickly entered a successful run with victories over Dave Ruhl, Austin and Tank Morgan. This resulted in Morales defeating Curtis Iaukea for the NWA Hawaii Heavyweight Championship on May 21, 1969, and Kiniski for the NWA North American Heavyweight Championship less than a month afterwards. During this timeframe he also teamed with several wrestlers, including Gomez, Don Leo Jonathon, Dory Dixon and Ed Francis. Morales went on to defeat Austin and Kiniski in rematches, interrupting this run by unsuccessfully challenging Pat Paterson for the NWA United States Heavyweight Championship in California. On October 13, 1969, he added the Hawaii Tag Team Championship to his other titles along Francis, holding it for a couple of weeks. After defeating Rocky Montero and Gorilla Monsoon, Morales dropped the North American Championship to Curtis Iaukea on September 24, 1969. However, in his following appearance he recovered the Hawaii Tag Team titles with Francis. After successfully teaming with Bing Ki Lee on three consecutive cards, Morales recovered the North American belt from Iaukea on November 5, 1969. In the final events of the year, he defeated "The Original Sheik" Ed Farhat, got disqualified twice against Tank Morgan and wrestled Johhny Barend. Morales began 1970 by wrestling in a series against Jack Bence, which later involved Bing Ki Lee and Tank Morgan. After defeating both Bence and Morgan, he returned to his feud with Barend dropping the North American Heavyweight Championship on February 7, 1970. Morales recovered by winning a match over Mac MacFarland and teaming with Bing Ki Lee to win the Hawaii Tag Team Championship from Barend and Ripper Collins. The team was successful in their next encounter against Kinji Shibuya and Mitsu Arakawa. After defeating Barend in a stretcher match, Morales defeated Les Roberts and advanced to the second round of the Strelich Tournament, a single-knockdown competition for the Strelich Perpetual Trophy, with a win over Woody Farmer. However, a loss to Don Carson in the quarterfinals eliminated him from the event.

He made a brief return to California, partnering with Freddie Blassie, but the team lost a series against Don Carson and the Great Kojika. Back in Hawaii, Morales defeated Bad Boy Shields, Mr. Fujiwara, Les Roberts and Mac MacFarland, only losing a match to Kinji Shibuya, during the following couple of months. In late May, Hard Boiled Haggerty arrived to the promotion. This reignited their feud in two encounters that favored Morales, who won a tag team match and tied in singles. Stan Frazier and Tony Borne were the next opponents that he bested during the summer. On July 1, 1970, Morales and Bing Ki Lee lost the Hawaii Tag Team Championship to Barend and Billy Robinson. In his next appearance, he joined Sam Steamboat and Hahn Lee in a win over Barend, Killer Karl Kox and Ripper Collins. In another tour to California, Morales lost to Black Gordman by count out and defeated Don Serrano, also teaming with Rocky Johnson for the first time to wrestle the Great Kojika and John Tolos. He then got disqualified in a match against Barrend and tied with Kinji Shibuya. On August 5, 1970, Morales regained the North American Heavyweight Championship from Barend. He was then involved in a series of matches involving John Tolos, whom he defeated in a tag team competition but lost in singles. During the following two months, Morales recorded a series of draws in matches against Ripper Collins, Billy Robinson and Kinji Shibuya twice. After snapping this streak with a win over Abdullah the Butcher, he dropped the North American Heavyweight Championship to The Destroyer. In his final two matches in the MPP, Morales bested Jack Armstrong in a three-fall match and lost a 4-on-4 against Collins, Barend and The Destroyer while teaming with Sam Steamboat, Billy Robinson, Frank Allman and Hahn Lee. Returning to California, Morales began by defeating El Lobo on several encounters, also scoring wins over The Texan and John Tolos before losing the final of a one-night tournament for the NWA Pacific Coast Heavyweight Championship to Tony Rocca. During his final months in the West Coast, he defeated Karl Heisinger and Billy Graham, also participating in several tag team matches along Rocca and Ray Mendoza.

=== World Wide Wrestling Federation (1970–1975) ===
Morales made his first appearance for the World Wide Wrestling Federation, now known as WWE, on November 21, 1970, by teaming with Chief Jay Strongbow in a draw against The Mongols, Newton Tattrie and Josip Peruzovic, as part of a one-night appearance. Now a full-time member of the WWWF roster, he joined Gorilla Monsoon the following month, scoring a win in a three-fall rematch. In his singles debut, Morales defeated Joe Turco. This was followed by wins over The Black Demon, "The Wolfman" Willie Farkas and Bulldog Brower during the following month. On January 7, 1971, Morales won the vacant WWWF United States Championship by defeating Blassie in a tournament final. A team-up with Gorilla Monsoon also took place in two draws involving The Mongols.

On February 8, 1971, Morales defeated Ivan Koloff to win the WWWF World Heavyweight Championship (Note: The title was renamed to WWWF Heavyweight Championship during this reign, since the promotion rejoined the NWA.) only a month after winning his first individual title within the promotion. The move also vacated the United States Championship. This ignited a series of wins over the likes of Jack Evans and his previous opponents The Black Demon and Bulldog Brower. Subsequently, a series of victories in tag team matches involving Blackjack Mulligan evolved into a feud of single encounters, in which Morales won half a dozen events, before scoring two more team victories along Moonson. Meanwhile, The Wolfman and Bulldog Brower became recurrent enhancement talents during this run. Morales also scored wins over the likes of Beautiful Bobby and Tarzan Tyler, who eventually teamed up with Luke Graham, which turned into a double feud against both. Tyler, The Black Demon, Graham and The Beautiful Bobby were the opponents faced by him during a winning streak that extended throughout the summer. Different tag teams along with Monsoon, Jay Strongbow and Manuel Soto experienced similar success. During August 1971, Morales scored several victories over Graham and Tyler, also besting them as a tag team and in a 3-on-3 match that included Lou Albano. However, in his final contest of the month he suffered a loss to Stan Stasiak. In September, Tyler and Graham brought in Jimmy Valiant as a teammate, which led to a series of matches including a win over him in a steel cage. On October 25, 1971, Morales defeated Stasiak in a Texas Death match. The following month brought wins over Tyler and Valiant, but also included an encounter where he bested Freddie Blassie and a continuation of the feud against Stasiak during the second half. During this time-frame, Rivera joined Morales in the WWWF, becoming part of his usual partners along Monsoon and Strongbow. He closed 1971 by defeating Blassie in a Roman Gladiator match, Ray Stevens, Stan Stasiak twice and The Rugged Russians along with Rivera.

First contender Blassie and Stasiak remained Morales' main rivals in the first two months of 1972, against whom he scored several draws and some wins. Graham, Valiant and Toru Tanaka served as enhancement talents. On February 18, 1972, Morales and Rivera defeated The Rugged Russians, continuing this parallel rivalry. March featured several different matchups, in which he emerged victorious against "Baron" Mikel Scicluna, Smasher Sloan and Rugged Russian #2, while consistently teaming with Rivera against Curtis Iaukea and Scicluna, both of whom he defeated individually throughout April. The following month featured feuds which ended in Morales earning several victories over Pampero Firpo, Tanaka, Iaukea and Albano. After disposing of Valiant, Graham, Scicluna and Graham again, the feud against Albano continued with wins in regular and steel cage matches. During June 1972, Morales also bested other notable opponents, including Nikita Mulkovitch, Blue Demon and Ernie Ladd. To continue this run, he defeated George Steele in New York. Following three wins over Tanaka and more against Firpo, Morales teamed with Sammartino on July 18, 1972, to face the former and Mr. Fuji. The match featured the two most popular wrestlers of the era, but finished in a no contest with both of the involved in a confrontation after Mr. Fuji threw salt in both of their faces, ensuing a fight. A rematch took place, this time in a team with Monsoon, but finished in a draw. Morales defeated both Tanaka and Mr. Fuji by countout and won the following two tag team matches. This was followed by a series involving Steele, Fuji, Ernie Ladd, Chuck O'Connor, aka Big John Studd, and "The Spoiler" Don Jardine, none of whom were able to gain an upper hand against him. On September 30, 1972, Morales faced Bruno Sammartino in the first-ever match featuring the two fan favorite, technical wrestlers. The crowd favored him, despite Sammartino's large fan base in the city of New York. After 75 minutes of wrestling featuring several near-falls, the contest ended in a draw, when the city's curfew entered into effect. Subsequently, both performers embraced, signifying the end of their rivalry and the reformation of the tag team. However, the lack of a resolution was not well received, the fans were noticeably angry, and some jumped into the dugouts to shake their fists at the wrestlers. The main event of the 1972 Showdown at Shea later became known as "The Match of the Century" and is still regarded as one of the best events in the history of professional wrestling. After scoring a win over The Spoiler, Morales joined Sammartino in a rematch against Tanaka and Mr. Fuji, this time emerging victorious in a three-fall contest.

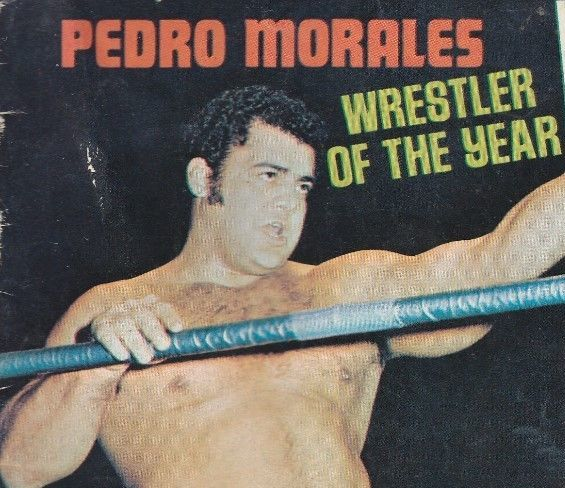
Morales on the cover of 1973 Wrestling Annual magazine.

This was followed with a rematch, this time teaming with André the Giant. The Spoiler remained Morales most common adversary during the following months, which resulted in wins over him and his partner, Buddy Wolfe. Other wrestlers to fail in their attempts to defeat Morales were Ernie Ladd, The Sheik and Ray Stevens. To close the year, Morales defeated Tanaka individually and in tag team action, before going on to defeat Wolfe on several occasions. On December 2, 1972, he rejoined Rivera in a win. During the first months of 1973, Morales bested Mr. Fuji, Buddy Wolfe and Lonnie Mayne, as well as Hans Schmidt, Lonnie Mayne and Curtis Iaukea. He also teamed with Moonson, Bobo Brazil and Strongbow. A feud with Mayne went on to include a steel cage match. A series against Freddie Blassie concluded with three singles wins for Morales, also including a tag team contest. Throughout April and May, he successfully faced a number of recycled adversaries, including Mayne, Wolfe and Tanaka, along with wins over new ones such as Don Leo Jonathan and Mike McCord, aka Austin Idol. Morales also defeated Blassie twice, including a steel cage match. Throughout the summer, he performed mostly as a singles wrestler, gathering wins over Toru Tanaka, Paul Jones, Lonnie Mayne, Jonathan, McCord and George Steele facing them repeatedly in cyclical fashion. This trend was broken with the arrival of August, when Morales bested other figures including Blackjack Lanza and Stan Stasiak. During the month of September 1973, he was placed over Ib Solvang Hansen, McCord, Steele and Fuji. Morales went on to win a series against Lanza and a Texas Death Match involving Stasiak, before having Fuji serve as enhancement talent for the following weeks. On November 2, 1973, he made an appearance in AWA, winning a three-fall contest over Ray Stevens. Morales worked an angle with the then-villain Larry Hennig, besting him in singles. He followed this by entering a feud with Stasiak which featured mixed results, but concluded with him dropping the WWWF Heavyweight Championship on December 1, 1973. Morales' title run lasted 1,027 days, remaining to this date the longest reign by any Latino and the fifth longest overall. His reign was featured in the independent film The Wrestler, where footage of him was shown while two characters remarked "C1: Morales... Eastern league champion. C2: And he is young. C1: He sure is good..." as part of a discussion of dangerous adversaries that could be possible opponents for an aging wrestler.

Following this, he returned in two tag team matches, before defeating Stasiak twice in three rematches. One of these matches was promoted by Sponsham wrestling and held at Roberto Clemente Coliseum. Morales remained successful as a singles wrestler, gathering wins over Fuji, Eddie Sullivan, Otto Von Heller, Johnny Rodz and Black Gordman during the first half of 1974. During the second half of the year, he bested Nikolai Volkoff and Strong Kobayashi, before exchanging results in a long-running feud against Killer Kowalski. In his final phase of this run for the promotion, Morales was victorious over Butcher Vachon, wrestling his final match on March 1, 1975.

=== Big Time Wrestling (1975–1976) ===
Four days later, Morales returned to California, wrestling for the Big Time Wrestling territory in San Francisco. Despite now serving mainly as a tag team performer along Manny Cruz, Raul Mata, Pat Patterson, Cowboy Lang and The Haitian Kid among others, he also remained a singles attraction, gathering wins over Ricky Hunter, The Brute and winning a feud over Kurt Von Brauner during the following two months. Morales began the summer by teaming with Patterson on a consistent basis, sometimes alternating to include Peter Maivia, Don Muraco or a random wrestler. Their main opponents during this timeframe were The Invaders, against whom they exchanged results, with Morales and Patterson winning the NWA San Francisco World Tag Team Championship on October 29, 1975. Immediately afterwards, they became involved in a series against Don Muraco and Mr. Saito that lasted for the remainder of the year and from which they emerged with the best balance. To begin the following year, Mr. Saito and The Invaders were included in the feud, teaming with Muraco and Fuji on alternate events. The rivalry eventually shifted to singles competition, where Morales defeated Muraco on three dates before losing once. To close this run, he lost a contest to The Great Fuji by being counted out. Morales made two appearances in St. Louis, winning two tag team matches and defeating Ox Baker individually.

=== American Wrestling Association (1976–1977) ===
On October 30, 1976, he joined the American Wrestling Association as a full-time performer. Returning to his former singles pace, Morales went on to immediately enter an undefeated streak over Bobby Jones, Moose Morowski, Buddy Wolff, Frankie Hill, Baron Von Raschke, Vito Martino, Ray Stevens, Pierre Poisson, Blackjack Lanza, Puppy Dog Peloquin, Rodeo Jones, Roger Kirby, Ray Stevens, Joe Carlos and Frankie Hill to close the year. To open 1977, he continued to trend in matches including Tom DeMarco, Mike Soma, Mad Dog Vachon, Baron Von Raschke, Poisson, Bobby Duncum, Moose Morowski and Jim Brunzell, also winning a battle royale and drawing in a series against The Super Destroyer. His streak continued the following month, this time over Bob Arnel and The Strangler, going on to include matchups against the opponents that he had already defeated. The feud with The Super Destroyer resumed shortly afterwards, this time ending with another draw and two wins for Morales. A rivalry with Nick Bockwinkel also took place in parallel, recording a no contest and a victory. After briefly teaming with Peter Maivia, Morales defeated Armando Rodriguez and entered a series against Alfred Hayes, which ended with a balance of five wins, two losses and two draws. Afterwards, he recorded mixed results in several contests against The Super Destroyer. In what marked the final stage of this AWA run, Morales continued defeating jobbers Mike York, Kenny Jay and The Strangler, but began losing more often to talent that he had bested earlier including Nick Bockwinkel and others such as Angelo Mosca.

=== Championship Wrestling from Florida (1977–1978) ===
After migrating to Championship Wrestling from Florida, he immediately emerged victorious from a rivalry with Pat Patterson. In this territory, Morales’ tag team with Johnson became more active and defeated the team of Patterson & Ivan Koloff on five consecutive encounters. A second feud, this time with Don Muraco was not as successful and he experienced mixed results, but also winning more often than he lost. During this time-frame, Morales also faced “Superstar” Billy Graham and Lars Anderson on a regular basis. On October 8, 1977, Morales unsuccessfully challenged Harley Race for the NWA World Heavyweight Championship. Afterwards, Koloff joined Mr. Saito as his main partner in the ongoing team feud, but both of the combinations with Johnson and Muraco were able to best them. Morales then teamed twice with Dusty Rhodes in a draw and a win against Lars Anderson & Killer Karl Kox, also teaming with Muraco one last time to defeat Koloff and Saito. On December 6, 1977, Morales wrestled Race for the NWA World Heavyweight Championship, failing to win the belt. The following night he faced Race, Dick Murdoch, Baron Von Krupp and Mr. Sakuruda for the title, but was disqualified. To close the year, Morales earned singles victories over Buddy Roberts and Tank Patton. His team along Johnson opened the year by winning their first two matches, going on to defeat Koloff and Saito to win the NWA Florida Tag Team Championship on January 24, 1978. Concurrently, Morales wrestled Anderson and divided honors in a series which included a win in the Superbowl of Wrestling. A feud with Killer Karl Kox ended in individual and team losses, a streak which ended costing them the titles. After recovering with wins over Koloff and Saito, Morales and Johnson regained the NWA Florida Tag Team Championship on February 14, 1978. This reign was short, lasting only two weeks before dropping them to Saito and Mr. Sato. Morales then wrestled several singles matches, defeating Killer Karl Kox, Bobby Dumcum, Saito, Bob Roop, Jack Ruggers and Charlie Cook, dividing contests with Dick Slater and losing to Koloff. This was followed by three new partners, Tiger Conway, Jr., with whom he won four consecutive bouts, Joe Azzari, which led to two losses, and Jerry Brisco, who wrestled with him in two draws.

=== New Japan Pro-Wrestling and Canada (1978–1980) ===
On May 5, 1978, Morales returned to Puerto Rico for one night and teamed with Rivera. Afterwards, Ron Mikolajczyk became a recurrent teammate, mostly in matches involving Butch Bronson and a chosen partner. During the following months, Morales scored wins over Len Denton, Butch Cassidy, Rick Oliver and Sir Winston, but lost to Killer Karl Kox, Dick Slater and The Spoilers. On June 23, 1978, he made a tour to New Japan Pro-Wrestling, but only participated in tag matches. This was followed by a visit to Kansas, where Morales defeated Alex Perez and lost to Jesse Ventura. In October, he toured Germany, with a win over Amet Chong and losses to Kublai Khan. On November 11, 1978, Morales made a one night visit to California, teaming with Chavo Guerrero, Sr. in a win over Eddie Mansfield and The Grappler. The following year, he began making appearances in Virginia, North Carolina, South Carolina and Georgia. His first partner became Skip Young, along whom he managed to gain mixed results in matches involving Moose Morowski, John Studd and Baron Von Raschke among others. In singles competition, Morales defeated Mr. X #1, Brute Bernard and Morowski. A secondary teammate, Les Thornton, joined him in several victories, while Abe Jacobs and Johnny Weaver teamed occasionally. Eventually, Jay Youngblood became Morales's main partner, recording a winning streak while he also teamed with several other wrestlers including Cocoa Samoa, Tiger Jeet Singh and Bob Marcus with similar success. However, as a single performer he lost matches to Nick Bockwinkel, Len Denton and Killer Karl Kox, also failing to advance in a tournament for the NWA Canadian Heavyweight Championship. His victories during this time-frame were over Brute Bernard, Rudy Kay and Charlie Fulton. On November 8, 1979, Morales returned to NJPW, besting Kengo Kimura, Kuniaki Kobayashi, drawing with Tatsumi Fujinami and losing to Antonio Inoki. He also teamed with Singh and Bob Backlund in wins that included victories over both Fujinami and Inoki, but lost along with Greg Valentine in return matches. To open the following year, Morales relocated to Canada, where he defeated David Patterson, Mr. X #1, The Scorpion, Doug Somers and Brute Bernard, but lost a series to Ox Baker in alternate dates at South and North Carolina. In his final matches within the NWA circuit, Morales earned wins over Billy Starr, Frankie Laine and The Destroyer, both in singles and tag team matches.

=== Return to WWF (1980–1983, 1985–1987) ===
==== Triple Crown Champion (1980–1983) ====
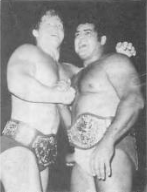
Morales and Bob Backlund as WWF Tag Team Champions in 1980

On May 6, 1980, Morales returned to the renamed World Wrestling Federation, defeating Moose Monroe, Frank Savage, Mark Pole, Brute Bernard and Ben Alexander during the course of the following weeks. He formed a tag team with Bob Backlund, which won its first two contests. Meanwhile, Morales continued on his successful run with victories over Ron Shaw, Mikel Scicluna, Tor Kamata, Afa Anoaʻi Jr., B.B. Coleman, Johnny Rodz and The Hangman. On August 9, 1980, he won the WWF Tag Team Championship along with Backlund by besting Afa and Sika, the Wild Samoans, at the Showdown at Shea 1980. However, they had to forfeit the championship belts the following day, due to a rule stating that no heavyweight champion could hold a second title at the same time. During the following month, Afa and Kamata served as enhancement talent, while Morales also participated in a battle royale. Afterwards, he went on to defeat several adversaries, including Larry Zbyszko, Scicluna, Afa, Rodz and The Hangman. A series with Ken Patera intensified after a loss, with Morales recovering to defeat him to win the WWF Intercontinental Heavyweight Championship on December 8, 1980. With this win, he became the first man in history to win the Triple Crown Championship, which along his United States Championship reign also meant holding all of the promotion's titles during his era, a recognition that only he held for almost two decades. Morales also feuded with Sgt. Slaughter, defeating him by disqualification. During the early months of 1981, he continued defeating the likes of The Hangman, Ron Shaw, Jose Estrada and Zbyszko, but tied in contests against St. Slaughter and Stan Hansen. After defeating and drawing with St. Slaughter in another series, Killer Khan became Morales' most recurrent adversary, experiencing more success, while other names such as Greg Valentine and Hansen challenged him occasionally. This was followed by a short feud against The Moondogs, which ended with singles wins over both members of the team. On March 26, 1981, Morales faced Hulk Hogan, dominating throughout the match and winning by count out. The feud with The Moondogs resumed afterwards, with mixed results in tag team competition but another win over Moondog Rex. Another figure who became a mainstay was Sgt. Slaughter, whom he often defeated by disqualification.

Jerry Johnson and Johnny Rodz served as jobbers during this run. After participating in a battle royale won by Angelo Mosca, the two entered a feud, from which Morales emerged victorious. During the month of June, he also scored consecutive wins over his former rivals Killer Khan and Sgt. Slaughter, ending their respective storylines. This led to a feud against Don Muraco, to whom Morales dropped the Intercontinental Heavyweight Championship on June 20, 1981. Two subsequent rematches ended in one win, three losses and a draw. Morales began wrestling and defeating other adversaries, including George Steele, The Executioner and Larry Sharpe, besides the usual low card talents that he had consistently bested previously. The feud with Muraco continued and he earned two wins and a draw, leading to a titular rematch between them. Morales entered the contest with wins over The Executioner and Greg Valentine, winning the Intercontinental Heavyweight Championship back on November 23, 1981, in a Texas Death match. With this win, Morales became the first man to hold the Intercontinental title twice, and he held it for fourteen months, the longest reign up until that point. He was successful in four rematches against Muraco, with Valentine systematically becoming his main adversary. In his first bout of 1982, Morales defeated Valentine by disqualification. He was able to dominate Hans Schroeder, Larry Dee and Killer Khan, but drew in another match against Valentine, who also went on to win their next encounter by disqualification. Their series continued with the equitable results of one win, one loss and a draw. To continue, Morales won two consecutive contests, including a Brass Knuckles Alley Fight, but got disqualified in the third. This was momentarily interrupted with a short program against Mr. Fuji, Mr. Saito and Lou Albano, which also featured wins over Rodz and Adrian Adonis. After being resumed, Morales won two more matches over Valentine, once again being disqualified in the third, before coming back to win in a Texas Death match. He then entered a winning streak, during which he defeated The Black Demon twice, Jesse Ventura by countout, Adonis thrice, Fuji and Valentine four times, two of these being Brass Knuckles Matches and other a Street Fight. This came to an end when Morales was disqualified against Jimmy Snuka. He wrestled Valentine three more times, winning in a Brass Knuckles match and by countout.

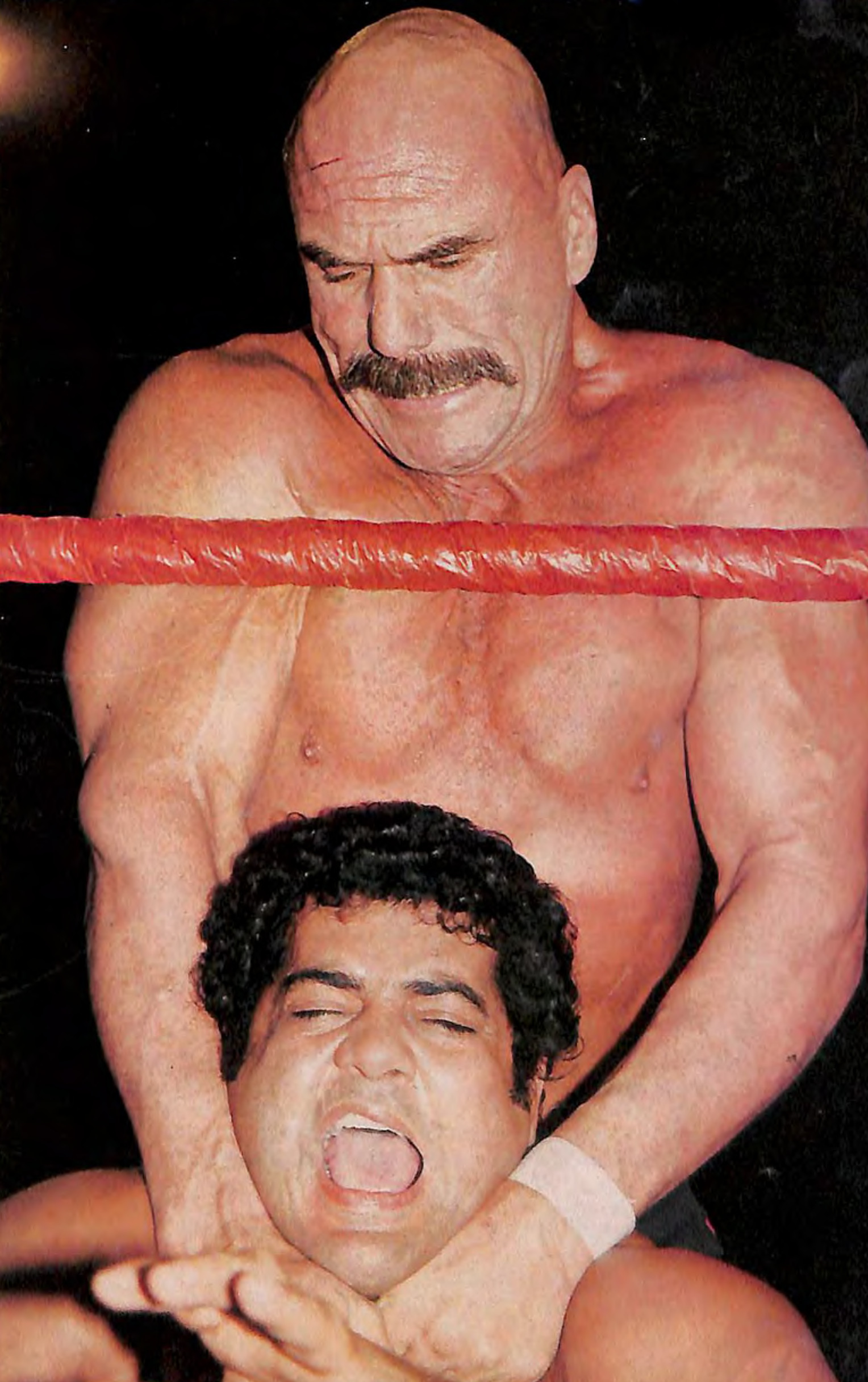
Morales (bottom) during a match against Superstar Billy Graham (top), circa 1983

During the summer of 1982, Morales feuded with Bob Orton, Jr., gaining the upper hand after being disqualified in the open bout. Estrada, Saito and Swede Hanson were also bested during this time. However, this streak was also ended in a count out loss to Snuka. In September, Morales won contests over Rocky Cole and Scicluna, but was counted out against Buddy Rose, which led to a draw in a rematch. He opened the following months with victories in matches featuring Bob Bradley, Tony Russo and Swede Hanson, but was counted out in a challenge by Superstar Billy Graham. Morales continued his feud with Buddy Rose, defeating him by disqualification. Two more matches against Graham ended in a draw and a disqualification loss. Afterwards, Morales was involved in a no contest and a double disqualification draw with Rose, going on to close with two consecutive wins. During the month of November, he divided honors with Graham, also scoring victories over Tony Russo and Fuji. On December 28, 1982, Morales wrestled Don Muraco to a double disqualification draw. On his first match of 1983, the result was repeated, this time in a match involving Graham. The following weeks brought wins over Sammy Sanders, Bob Bradley, Fuji and Rose, but also losses to Graham and Muraco, most of which were by countout or disqualification. After besting Graham in another bout, Morales dropped the Intercontinental Heavyweight Championship to Muraco on January 22, 1983. However, he countered by winning a rematch, also defeating Graham before losing a second rubber match. Afterwards, Morales gained wins over Swede Hanson, Bob Bradley, Victor Rivera, Buddy Rose, Huertas Gonzalez and Fuji. He also emerged victorious from a feud with Graham, winning the majority of their encounters. Morales and Muraco went on to exchange results, but neither one was able to dominate cleanly, with most wins being consequence of count outs and disqualifications. Meanwhile, he bested Eddie Carson and participated in occasional multi-wrestler team matches.

==== Puerto Rican tours (1983–1984) ====
On April 23, 1983, Morales began a tour in his native Puerto Rico performing for Capitol Sports Promotions (CSP), now known as the World Wrestling Council, challenging Ric Flair for the NWA World Heavyweight Championship in his first appearance.

After a brief interruption where he bested Swede Hanson in a WWF card held at New York, Morales returned to CSP joining Carlos Colón, Sr. to win the CSP World Tag Team Championship over The Medics. On June 25, 1983, he defeated Buddy Landel to add the CSP North American Heavyweight Championship. In a rare CSP card outside of Puerto Rican soil, Morales wrestled Hugo Savinovich in Trinidad. On September 10, 1983, The Medics recovered the titles from Morales and Colón. One week later, Morales faced Ric Flair in the first Aniversario event, winning the contest by disqualification. On January 6, 1984, he dropped the North American Heavyweight Championship to Sweet Daddy Siki. After wrestling Cyclon Negro in Trinidad and defeating Buddy Rose in a WWF event, Morales won a rematch against Siki, recovering the title. He held the belt until September 15, 1984, dropping it to Randy Savage during the final stage of his CSP stay. Another notable opponent was J. J. Dillon. This run was highlighted by a feud against Bob Sweetan, who injured Morales' neck with a piledriver during one of their encounters.

==== Various feuds and retirement (1985–1987) ====
During the months of March and April 1985, Morales participated in tag team matches for the WWF, including participation in a show held in Kuwait. Morales later went on to defeat Mr. X, Terry Gibbs and Steve Lombardi during the following months. On May 24, 1985, he wrestled Strong Machine #1 to a draw in a NJPW show. Morales entered the 1985 King of the Ring tournament, besting Johnny V in the opening contest before receiving a bye during the quarterfinals. However, he was eliminated by Muraco in the semifinals. During this time-frame, Tito Santana became his occasional tag team partner. Individually, Morales went on to defeat Mr.X several times, Gibbs, Lombardi and Barry O twice, Rene Goulet four times and Tiger Chung Lee. He was also successful in two team matches along Santana. On September 12, 1985, Morales bested Muraco in New Jersey. The following night he claimed a win over Valentine. Morales defeated Bob Orton, Jr., Goulet and Barry O to conclude the month. October began with a winning streak which featured Les Thornton and Matt Borne along with enhancement talent, until this victory spree was halted by The Missing Link.

Morales made his following appearance in a WWF event held in San Juan, Puerto Rico, where he defeated The Spoiler. The second half of the month brought wins in two matches along with Santana and singles success over opponents that he had previously wrestled. This pattern continued in November, when Morales and Santana exchanged results against Valentine and Brutus Beefcake. Individually, he gained victories over several familiar performers including Lee, Barry O, Gibbs and The Spoiler, also winning a series against Alexi Smirnoff and losing a single time to Orton. Contests including Moondog Spot, Thorton and Lee ended in the same fashion, with Morales going on to win a rematch over Orton. On December 12, 1985, Goulet scored a rare win over him. In turn, Morales ended the year with wins over Matt Borne, The Spoiler, Smirnoff, Barry O and Mike Sharpe, in the process successfully teaming with Santana. He won his first two contests of 1986 Moondog Spot and Lee, before losing to Terry Funk. This was followed by a series of tag team matches along Santana and Danny Spivey, which ended with a 2–1 balance. After besting two jobbers, Morales teamed with Steve Gatorwolf to defeat Valentine and Beefcake. After four more wins over his regular opponents, he lost to Orton. This pattern was repeated once more, but this time Morales earned a disqualification victory over Orton after winning the first four contests. Concurrently to this series, he was involved in a 3-on-3 match. On February 15, 1986, Morales defeated Bret Hart in Phoenix, Arizona. This was followed with wins over Goulet, Thorthon, Steve Lombardi and a successful feud against Orton. Morales made his only WrestleMania appearance in 1986 when he was a part of a 20-man invitational battle royal at WrestleMania 2. After two tag team victories along Santana, Morales defeated Hercules and Beefcake among others. This was followed by a prolonged series with both members of the Moondogs, from which he emerged victorious. On May 17, 1986, Morales defeated The Iron Sheik in a WWF return to California. His tag team with Santana remained successful, winning their contests throughout the summer. Meanwhile, Morales earned wins over Paul Christy, Roger Kirby, Lee, The Iron Sheik and Hercules, but began to lose more often against opponents such as Jake Roberts, King Kong Bundy and Savage. Like the year before, he entered the King of the Ring tournament, advancing with a win over Rudy Diamond. Morales advanced further by besting Mike Rotundo in the quarterfinals and Nikolai Volkoff in the semifinals, but lost the final to Harley Race. The following months brought mixed results, with wins over Muraco and Jim Neidhart but losses to Hercules and Adrian Adonis.

Morales recovered by defeating Savage three times and Gibbs once, while drawing with Orton before losing a rematch to Race. He entered the Sam Muchnick Memorial Tournament, winning his matchup against Funk in the opening round before being eliminated by Beefcake in the quarterfinals. On September 20, 1986, Morales defeated Jake Roberts. His next two feuds featured him getting disqualified and defeated by Muraco, exchanging results with Hercules and dominating Moondog Rex. However, his next series against Kamala saw him being counted out and pinned. A feud with Orton ended in similar fashion. Morales' team with Santana suffered the same fate, losing twice and participating in a double count out draw. Two rivalries involving Hercules and Steve Lombardi ended with mixed results. Afterwards, Morales won contests over The Red Demon, Lombardi and Sivi Afi, while losing to Muraco and being counted out against Savage. The following month opened with victories over Sika, Muraco and Lombardi, but also included loses to Dino Bravo, Butch Reed, Kamala and Hercules. In December, Morales bested Jimmy Jack Funk, Volkoff, Frenchy Martin and Bravo, but also featured an unsuccessful rivalry with Race. He opened 1987 with a win over Bret Hart, before teaming with Santana twice with mixed results. At 44 years old, Morales was entering his final year as an active wrestler, now being moved back in the card. He lost a series of matches against Bravo, but, bested Muraco before entering a feud with Nick Kiniski that featured several draws before he gained the upper hand in the final bout. Despite this, during this stage of his career Morales was unable to gain wins over the likes of King Kong Bundy and Bravo, unsuccessfully challenging the new Intercontinental Champion, The Honky Tonk Man, on several dates. Some wrestlers that he had bested in the past, such as Butch Reed or Sika were also booked over him, along with strong adversaries such as Jake Roberts, Bravo, Orton and Paul Orndorff. His wins over this time-span were over Moondog Spot, Sika and Jimmy Jack Funk. On March 8, 1987, Morales teamed with Danny Spivey in the quarterfinals of a tournament for the World Tag Team Championship, but they were eliminated by Rick Martel and Tom Zenk. May was marked by several unsuccessful matches that formed part of a rivalry with Ron Bass, but finished with a win over Lombardi. Morales and Santana teamed twice more, but were unable to overtake the team of Haku and Tama, however, he subsequently joined Jim Brunzell, in emerging victorious over The Hart Foundation which in its original incarnation as cited here was made up of Bret Hart and Jim Neidhart. During July, he bested Martin twice, also losing to One Man Gang and Orndorff. Morales made a final in-ring appearance as professional wrestler by participating in a battle royale held on November 16, 1987.

=== Retirement (1987–2019) ===
Following his retirement from the squared circle, Morales became a road agent and later a commentator for WWF's Spanish-language programming, the first time that a Puerto Rican performed this duty for an international promotion. He returned to this role working for World Championship Wrestling during the 1990s, narrating Nitro and pay per views alongside Miguel Alonzo. This accomplishment has since been duplicated by Jack Meléndez and Willie Urbina.

Morales made few wrestling related appearances since his WCW days, with his last appearances being at autograph signings in fan conventions. He appeared at Wrestling Reunion III in 2005 and Wrestling Reunion 5 in 2007, reuniting with Sammartino at the latter. Despite living a low profile life following his retirement, he was the inspiration for homages and mentions throughout the decades which followed. A self-proclaimed "old school" wrestler, he was not interested in the overselling of gimmicks and spectacle that is seen in modern professional wrestling, despite admitting the economic success of the "sports entertainment" formula.

== Legacy ==
Morales was inducted into the WWF Hall of Fame as part of the class of 1995. Professional wrestling critics and purists have discussed his contributions to the discipline in widespread publications. Tomás Marín Rodríguez "El Martillo", part of a group led by José Antonio Geigel and one of the founding members of the first promotion in Puerto Rico, expressed in an interview that he considers Morales the best Puerto Rican wrestler in history. Marín considered that both his in-ring style and chivalry made him "unique" among performers. Terry Funk, Stan Hansen, Greg Valentine and Magnificent Muraco have expressed having enjoyed working matches with Morales. Fernwood Gold III and Thor Jensen of UGO Networks listed him as the 36th best face wrestler in history, noting how he appealed to the fanbase in New York. His run as the first Latin American Intercontinental Champion is often lauded. Bill Barnwell of IGN Sports also included Morales in the site's list of Top Intercontinental Champions, placing him in the sixth slot. Jeremy Thomas of 411.com ranked him fifth as part of a debate among the website's staff. In a similar discussion held at Slam! Sports, writer Greg Oliver considered him the best wrestler to hold the belt, stating that when "he held the title, there was a sense of honour and pride with it". WWE itself ranked Morales in the ninth spot in the "Intercontinental Champions" entry of their Top 25 series. As merits for this recognition, the promotion mentioned him being the first wrestler to win the title twice and holding it for a combined total of over 600 days. His combined total stood as the record until he was surpassed by Gunther in February 2024. WWE also included him in a compendium titled "Top 50 Good Guys in Wrestling History", which featured wrestlers that performed as fan favorites during their careers. In September 2016, the promotion joined NBC Universo to commemorate National Hispanic Heritage Month, creating a series highlighting the career of several wrestlers including Morales.

Outside of the WWE, he has received recognition as a Latin American and Hispanic pioneer in other promotions. In mid-1996, Morales appeared at an event of the short lived American Wrestling Federation, in the championship match between Bob Orton, Jr. and Tito Santana, along with other superstars and legends like Sgt. Slaughter, Chris Adams, and special guest referee Jim Brunzell. On August 31, 2006, as part of a Total Nonstop Action Wrestling taping, Morales was mentioned by Konnan along fellow Hall of Famers Carlos Colón, Santana, Mil Máscaras and the Guerrero family, being acknowledged as Latinos that paved the way within the wrestling industry. This was part of an in-character celebratory speech following The Latin American Xchange's coronation as NWA World Tag Team Champions. In reality, Konnan credits him with "[teaching] a lot" about the politics of wrestling and "the things you need to do in the ring to be a success in this business" during his time in WCW. From 2003 onwards, the World Wrestling Council approached Morales and offered holding an Aniversario event in his honor, but he declined the invitations for ten years. In 2013, Morales accepted being the honoree of Aniversario 40. He was the centerpiece of the International Pedro Morales Fan Club, an independent organization that ran during the 1970s and that recruited members through wrestling magazines. In 2000, The Ring Chronicle inducted Morales into its own version of the Professional Wrestling Hall of Fame. Modern fan reaction has also been positive in regards to the historical significance of his accomplishments. Nate Scaccia, a contributor to the website Bleacher Report, considers Morales the best Intercontinental champion of all time, ranking first in the title's entry at the website's WWE Champion Series. Michael Robinson and Will Baker, amateur writers for the same site, also consider him the 31st best WWE wrestler in history and 11th greatest WWE Champion respectively. He repeated at the ninth place in a subsequent interpretation. Besides the wrestling and sports media, the mun2 network also featured Morales in an article that listed their selection for the "20 of the most memorable Latino wrestlers in WWE history" which was published in 2012. When compiling a list based on the "[wrestler's] impact on the [Puerto Rican] fanbase", Raúl Álzaga of Primera Hora listed him third overall.

As a trainer, Morales was involved in the instruction of Dory Funk Jr., a former NWA World Heavyweight Champion who in 2009 was inducted into the Hall of Fame as part of The Funks. In 2022, his estate signed a deal to appear in Greg Gagne’s AWA-inspired PowerTown action figure line.

== Personal life and death ==
Morales' mother Teodora was a businesswoman, who continued to advise him on economic decisions throughout his life. He met Karen Johnson in 1965, when she attended an event at Long Beach where he was performing. They dated for five years, with her working as a teacher while his career often took him abroad to other states and countries. The couple married in 1972, in a small ceremony held at Puerto Rico which was only attended by family and the judge, continuing this relationship throughout his wrestling career and afterwards. The couple had a son, Pedro Morales Jr. born in 1974. Due to the nature of his work, Morales had lived in over a dozen cities throughout his career, including some time in Japan. However, when his son was about to start kindergarten, the family bought a house in Central New Jersey. His wife began working at Avenel Street Elementary School. The resources gathered in the industry were reinvested in "stocks, bonds and properties" which allowed them to capitalize in the long term.

After his last job in pro wrestling as a Spanish-language commentator in WCW, Morales retired from the sport and permanently settled in Woodbridge Township, New Jersey, where he adopted gardening as a hobby, cultivating tomatoes in his personal garden. Due to working during a time when the ring featured no methods of protection, Morales suffered several injuries that continued to linger after his career was over, limiting the amount of physical exercise that he was capable of doing. However, he remained a frequent visitor to The Club, a gym located in Woodbridge. Despite being a resident of this area, he continued to travel frequently to Puerto Rico, visiting the archipelago multiple times per year. In 2003, he expressed interest in returning to live permanently in a coastal town near the Caribbean Sea once his wife retired. However, this did not materialize. An advanced case of Parkinson's disease prevented him from traveling to Puerto Rico during his final years. By this point his health had deteriorated, with the emergence of cardiac afflictions and cancer as well. Morales died on February 12, 2019, in Perth Amboy, New Jersey at the age of 76. He was survived by his wife, with their son predeceasing them in 2014.

== Championships and accomplishments ==
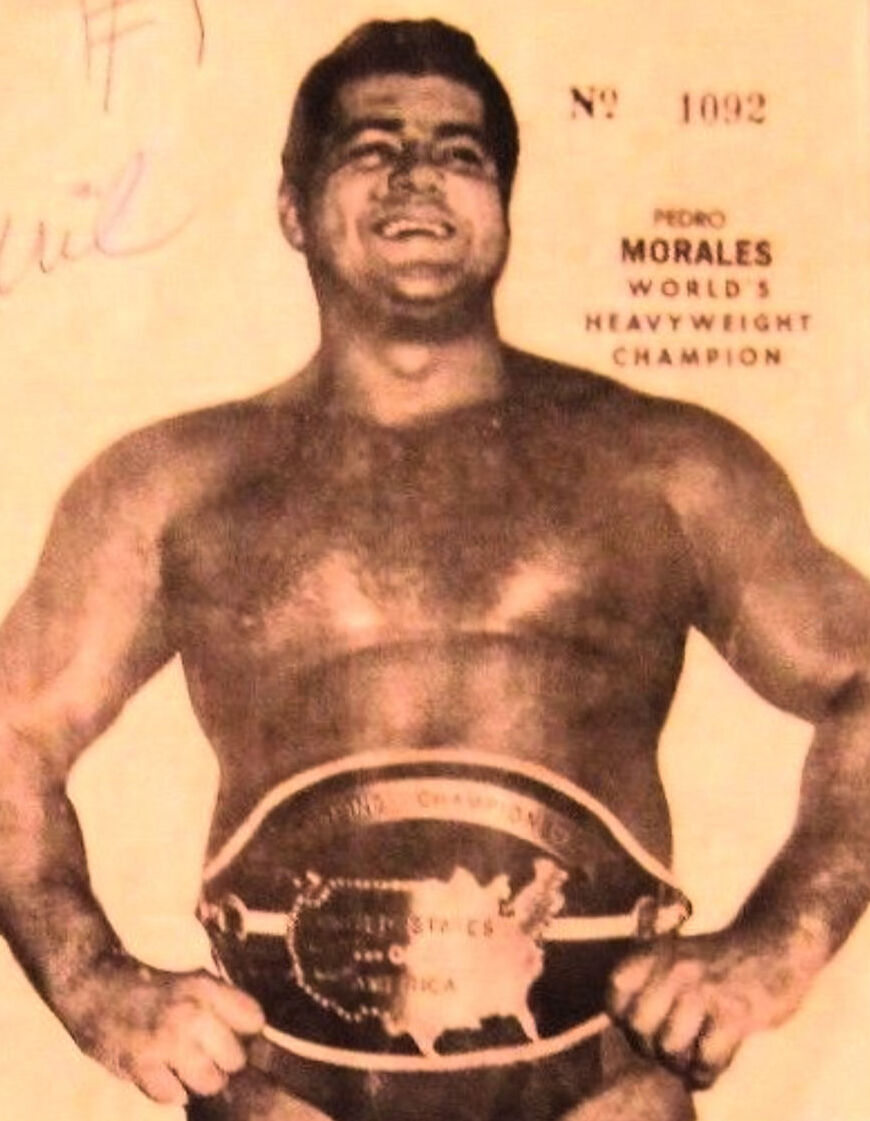
Morales as WWWF Heavyweight Champion in 1973

- 50th State Big Time Wrestling
  - NWA Hawaii Heavyweight Championship (1 time)
  - NWA Hawaii Tag Team Championship (3 times) – with Bing Ki Lee (1) and Ed Francis (2)
- American Wrestling Alliance / Big Time Wrestling (San Francisco)
  - NWA World Tag Team Championship (San Francisco version) (3 times) – with Pepper Gomez (2 times) and Pat Patterson (1 time)
- Cauliflower Alley Club
  - Other honoree (1994)
- Championship Wrestling from Florida
  - NWA Florida Tag Team Championship (1 time) – with Rocky Johnson
  - NWA Florida Television Championship (1 time)
  - NWA Southern Heavyweight Championship (Florida version) (1 time)
  - NWA North American Heavyweight Championship (Hawaii version) (3 times)
- Professional Wrestling Hall of Fame and Museum
  - Class of 2015
- Pro Wrestling Illustrated
  - Wrestler of the Year (1972)
  - PWI ranked him No. 111 of the 500 best singles wrestlers during the "PWI Years" in 2003.
- Worldwide Wrestling Associates
  - WWA World Heavyweight Championship (2 times)
  - WWA World Tag Team Championship (4 times) – with Luis Hernandez (1), Mark Lewin (1), Ricky Romero (1), and Victor Rivera (1)
- World Wrestling Council
  - WWC North American Heavyweight Championship (2 times)
  - WWC World Tag Team Championship (1 time) – with Carlos Colón, Sr.
- World Wide Wrestling Federation/World Wrestling Federation
  - WWWF Heavyweight Championship (1 time)
  - WWF Intercontinental Heavyweight Championship (2 times)
  - WWF Tag Team Championship (1 time) – with Bob Backlund
  - WWWF United States Heavyweight Championship (1 time)
  - First WWF Triple Crown Champion
  - WWF Hall of Fame (Class of 1995)
- Wrestling Observer Newsletter
  - Most Overrated (1981, 1982)
  - Wrestling Observer Newsletter Hall of Fame (Class of 2017)
