= Bob Davis =

Bob Davis may refer to:

== Sports ==
=== American football ===
- Bob Davis (American football coach) (1908–1965), American football coach at Colorado State University (1947–1955)
- Bob Davis (American football, born 1914) (1914–1980) American football
- Bob Davis (end) (1921–1998), American football end
- Bob Davis (tackle) (1927–2010), NFL tackle
- Bob Davis (American football, born 1930) (1930–2011), American football and wrestling coach
- Bob Davis (quarterback) (born 1945), AFL quarterback

=== Other sports ===
- Bob Davis (ice hockey) (1899–1970), Canadian ice hockey player
- Bob Davis (basketball coach) (1927–2021), American basketball coach
- Bob Davis (Australian rules footballer) (1928–2011)
- Bob Davis (pitcher) (1933–2001), American baseball pitcher
- Bobby Davis (wrestler) (1937–2021), American professional wrestling manager
- Bob Davis (sportscaster) (1944/1945–2025), radio broadcaster with the Kansas City Royals and the Kansas Jayhawks football and basketball teams
- Bob Davis (basketball player) (born 1950), retired basketball small forward
- Bob Davis (catcher) (born 1952), Major League Baseball catcher

== Others ==
- Robert Hobart Davis (1869–1942), usually known as Bob Davis, editor of The All-Story Magazine and Munsey's Magazine
- Robert R. Davis (born 1949), American economist and Commodity Futures Trading Commission commissioner
- Bob Davis (businessman) (born 1956), American businessman and CEO of Lycos
- Bob Davis (Michigan politician) (1932–2009), American politician who represented Michigan's 11th congressional district in the United States House of Representatives
- Bob Davis (Texas politician) (1941–2024), American politician
- Bob Davis (Wyoming politician), member of the Wyoming House of Representatives

== See also ==
- Bob David (disambiguation)
- Bob Davids (1926–2002), American baseball writer and researcher
- Robert Davis (disambiguation)
