= Miguel Pérez (wrestler) =

Puerto Rican professional wrestler (1937–2005)

- Pérez as the NWA World Tag Team Champion.

Personal information
- Born: Miguel José Pérez; June 22, 1937 Santurce, Puerto Rico
- Died: July 16, 2005 (aged 68)

Professional wrestling career
- Ring name(s): Miguel Pérez; José Miguel Pérez; Miguel Perez Sr.
- Billed height: 6 ft 1 in (185 cm)
- Billed weight: 238 lb (108 kg)
- Debut: October 15, 1954
- Retired: April 7, 2001

Miguel José Pérez (April 7, 1937 – July 16, 2005) was a Puerto Rican professional wrestler who was best known for his tag team with Antonino Rocca.

== Professional wrestling career ==
=== Montreal Athletic Commission (1954–1957) ===
Pérez started his professional wrestling career in 1954 at the age of 17. He debuted on October 15, 1954 and wrestled for Montreal Athletic Commission in his early days. He was the MAC World Heavyweight Champion. He left the company in 1957.

=== New York City (1957–1968) ===
In 1957, Pérez formed a tag team with popular wrestling star Antonino Rocca. They both wrestled in the famed Madison Square Garden on a regular basis. Pérez and Rocca captured the NWA World Tag Team Championship and were the first recognized champions in the ancestry of Capitol Wrestling Corporation, now known as WWE.

While Rocca left the company in 1963, and Pérez appeared in other areas, he was a regular on the undercard at Madison Square Garden through March 1968, when he pinned Crazy Luke Graham in less than 25 seconds in his final appearance. Some of his matches include 1964 wins over Lou Bastein, Lou Albano, and Bull Johnson; draws with Tony Marino, and then Red Bastein; with Pedro Morales teamed to lose to U.S. tagteam champs Dr. Jerry and Crazy Luke Graham, but came back to defeat Magnificent Maurice and Klondike Bill. Pérez won on disqualification over manager Bobby Davis, then teamed with Haystacks Calhoun to defeat Davis and Gorilla Monsoon. In February 1968, he pinned Crazy Luke Graham in 18 seconds in the new Garden. He left the WWWF in April 1968 and went to Florida until leaving the territory in October 1968 when he took a hiatus from wrestling.

=== World Wrestling Council (1974–1981) ===
In 1974, Pérez came out of retirement and joined the World Wrestling Council in Puerto Rico on January 6, 1974 as José Miguel Pérez. He was billed as the first WWC Puerto Rico Champion and it was the first show of WWC. He lost the title to Dr. Klodied on March 8, 1975. He defeated Klodied just two weeks later to get his second Puerto Rico title.

The title was held up on August 30 when Pérez had a match with Spoiler II. He won a tournament on September 20 and got his third Puerto Rico Heavyweight title. He lost the title to Tosh Togo on October 4. He would return teaming with former partner in CWC, Antonino Rocca. They both together captured the WWC North American Tag Team Championship on September 11, 1976 by defeating Los Infernos.

They lost the titles to Higo Hamaguchi and Gordon Nelson on October 16. He was still the partner of Rocca and they both wrestled as a tag team until March 15, 1977 when Rocca died. Pérez started to compete on singles. On May 7, 1977, Pérez captured his fourth and final Puerto Rico Heavyweight title by defeating Hurricane Castillo in a tournament final.

Just one week later, he lost the title to Castillo on May 14 in a rematch. Pérez still wrestled for WWC. He was injured on February 27, 1979 in a match against José Rivera. He was forced to retire from professional wrestling on March 6 because he was not able to wrestle. Though four months later on July 28, at Bayamon, he teamed up with Jack Veneno to take on the team of Hiro Sasaki and Kengo Kimura only for Veneno and Pérez to lose the match. After this, he retired for four years as a professional wrestler until he returned at WWC Anniversary on September 17, 1983, at the Hiram Bithorn Stadium in San Juan, Puerto Rico to take on Barrabas and defeated him. The next year at WWC Anniversary on September 14, at the same venue, saw Pérez's final match against Leo Burke and Burke defeated him. After this match, he retired as a professional wrestler for good.

=== Retirement (1981–2001) ===
Pérez returned in 1985 for an angle, where he appeared as a photographer at ring side taking pictures and scouting opponents before Miguel Pérez Jr. debut match. Pérez showed up during a match between Eric Embry and a jobber. Embry went to ring side and Pérez with camera in hand and Miguel Pérez Jr came to his father's rescue. This eventually lead to Pérez Jr debut match. Managed Mighty Igor in WWC. He came back in February 1992 and got involved in a feud with El Profe. He defeated El Profe in a hair vs. mask match. For the next several of years he made more appearances in WWC and the International Wrestling Association. His very last match was a 12 tag team match on April 7, 2001 with Perez's team winning.

== Personal life and death ==
On July 16, 2005, Pérez died of a heart attack. Miguel Pérez was posthumously honored at the World Wrestling Council 50th anniversary show.

Pérez's granddaughter, Nathalya Pérez, made her professional wrestling debut in 2022. She trained at the Espíritu Pro Wrestling Dojo in Puerto Rico.

== Championships and accomplishments ==
- Montreal Athletic Commission
  - MAC World Heavyweight Champion (1 time)
- Capitol Wrestling Corporation / World Wide Wrestling Federation / World Wrestling Federation / WWE
  - NWA World Tag Team Championship (Northeast version) (1 time, final) - with Antonino Rocca
- World Wrestling Council
  - WWC Puerto Rico Championship (4 times)
  - WWC North American Tag Team Championship (3 times) - with Carlos Colón (2) and Antonino Rocca (1)
- Americas Wrestling Federation (Puerto Rico)
  - AWF North America Heavyweight Championship (1 time)
- Wrestling Observer Newsletter
  - Wrestling Observer Newsletter Hall of Fame - (Class of 2023) with Antonino Rocca

== Luchas de Apuestas record ==
Winner (wager)	Loser (wager)	Location	Event	Date	Notes
Miguel Pérez (hair)	El Profe (mask)	Guaynabo, Puerto Rico	WWC show	July 14, 1992	

== See also ==
- Professional wrestling in Puerto Rico
