= Don Fargo =

German-American professional wrestler (1930-2015)

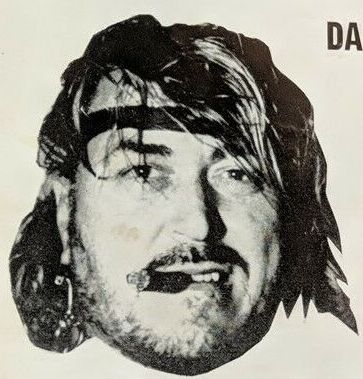
- As Jack Dillinger, circa 1969

Personal information
- Born: Donald Vincent Kalt; October 3, 1930 Germany
- Died: November 8, 2015 (aged 85) Pensacola, Florida, U.S.
- Spouse: Margie

Professional wrestling career
- Ring names: Donald Vincent Kalt; Don Colt; Don Fargo; Don Fonzo Fargo; Don Garfield; Don Juan the Magnificent; Don Kalt; Donnie Fargo; Don Stevens; Fonzo Fargo; Jack Dalton; Jack Dillinger; Wildman Stevens
- Billed height: 6 ft 0 in (1.83 m)
- Billed weight: 253 lb (115 kg)
- Billed from: Hell's Kitchen, New York
- Debut: 1952
- Retired: 1987

Donald Vincent Kalt (October 3, 1930 – November 8, 2015), better known by his ring name Don Fargo, was a German-born American professional wrestler. During his career (which spanned from 1952 to 1986), he held over 55 championships including 14 reigns as NWA World Tag Team Champion, most famously with Jackie Fargo as part of The Fabulous Fargos. He was a mainstay for various territories throughout the United States including NWA Mid-America, Georgia Championship Wrestling, Western States Sports and Big Time Wrestling (later World Class Championship wrestling). Gulf Coast wrestler Terry Lathan has called Fargo "one of the most colourful, fascinating personalities ever in wrestling."

He was inducted into the Professional Wrestling Hall of Fame and Museum (Class of 2014), the NWA Wrestling Legends Hall of Heroes (Class of 2009) and was an Honouree of the Cauliflower Alley Club in 2004.

== Professional wrestling career ==
Donald Vincent Kalt was born on October 3, 1930, in Germany but was raised in New York City and Pittsburgh, where he became involved in bodybuilding, winning the 1952 Mr. Pittsburgh bodybuilding competition. He began his professional wrestling career in Al Haft's Columbus promotion, competing under the ring name "Don Stevens", the kayfabe brother of Ray Stevens. While in Ohio, Kalt met former World Heavyweight Champion "Nature Boy" Buddy Rogers, whom Kalt credits his success to. "He was my idol" Kalt said of Rogers "I mirrored him a little bit. He didn't mind because I was doing such a good job of it."

He had stints under different names, including Don Juan the Magnificent – managed by Bobby Davis, also the manager of Buddy Rogers – before going to form "The Fabulous Fargos" with Jackie Fargo. "(They were) the best in the world. They were just ahead of their time...just way ahead of everybody else" Cowboy Bob Kelly said of the Fargos in "The Pro Wrestling Hall of Fame: The Tag Teams." They spent 1956–1960 competing throughout the United States as perhaps the most popular team of their day. Together they won the NWA World Tag Team titles in 1958 and dominated the National Wrestling Alliance during the late 1950s, headlining events throughout the northeast, Tennessee, Alabama, Georgia and Chicago. In 1957 Vincent J. McMahon reopened wrestling in Madison Square Garden, where the Fargos were booked. On Match 30, 1957, they headlined a World Tag Team Championship bout against Argentina Rocca and Miguel Perez before 20,125 fans which was the largest crowd drew in the area for over 25 years, dating back to Jim Londos in 1931.

In the 1960s The Fabulous Fargos also embarked on successful singles runs but would reunite occasionally, especially in the South, where they had a huge run in Tennessee in 64/65. "When me and Jackie were together, we were the greatest team" Don stated, "that sounds like bragging, but we had a good thing going."

In the early 1960s, Fargo became Jack Dalton and had title reigns as a tag team with Kenny Mack as a biker duo and Rene Goulet as a foreign legion duo, among others. He is retrospectively known for his many ring names in various promotions. Regardless of name, Fargo could draw money and heat in whichever territory he competed. Bob Kelly later stated that "it didn't matter who Don Kalt was portraying" and that Fargo "had phenomenal ring psychology." In Texas, Don teamed with Jim Dalton to form The Dirty Daltons. The team had success throughout the South until their breakup in 1965.

In Detroit, Fargo formed a tag team with a young Greg Valentine. "He was a great worker," Valentine said of Fargo. "I learned a lot from him...he really helped me out a lot." Valentine would later introduce Don Fargo to the audience as the Fargo Brothers were inducted into the Professional Wrestling Hall of Fame, class of 2014.

In 1969, Fargo formed a new team with Kenny Mack (now known as Frank Dillinger), achieving their greatest success in the World Wrestling Association, where they became two-time WWA World Tag Team Champions as "The Chain Gang." The team (and Frank Dillinger's career) ended after Frank was shot and injured in a bar fight in Wisconsin. The pair had been jumped by a real biker gang who had taken offence to the Dillingers; Don Fargo escaped unscathed by jumping into a river.

Fargo's autography, The Hard Way, has been called "required reading from how kayfabe once existed" due to his commitment to "living the gimmick" and being his wrestling persona at all times in public. "Every gimmick I did, I'm the only guy that lived. I lived it," Fargo said. "I stayed in costume 24 hours a day."

== Personal life ==
In his later years, Fargo lived in rural woodland near Cantonment, Florida, with his wife Margie and their many dogs. In the year preceding his death he had been battling cancer. He died on November 8, 2015.

== Championships and accomplishments ==
- American Wrestling Association
  - AWA Brass Knuckles Championship ( 1 time )
- Big Time Wrestling (Boston)
  - BTW World Tag Team Championship (1 time) - with Jackie Fargo
- Big Time Wrestling (Dallas)
  - NWA Texas Heavyweight Championship (1 time)
  - NWA Texas Tag Team Championship (2 times) – with Jim Dalton
  - NWA World Tag Team Championship (Texas version) (3 times) – with Jim Dalton
- Cauliflower Alley Club
  - Class of 2004
- Central States Wrestling
  - NWA Central States Heavyweight Championship ( 1 time )
- Fred Kohler Enterprises
  - NWA World Tag Team Championship (Chicago version) (1 time) – with Jackie Fargo
- Georgia Championship Wrestling
  - NWA Georgia Heavyweight Championship (1 time)
  - NWA World Tag Team Championship (Georgia version) (1 time) – with Jackie Fargo
- Gulf Coast Championship Wrestling
  - NWA Gulf Coast Brass Knuckles Championship (2 times)
  - NWA Gulf Coast Heavyweight Championship (2 times)
  - NWA Gulf Coast Tag Team Championship (1 time) – with Jackie Fargo
  - NWA Mississippi Tag Team Championship (Gulf Coast version) (1 time)
  - NWA Mississippi Heavyweight Championship (Gulf Coast version) (1 time) – with Rip Tyler
  - NWA United States Tag Team Championship (Gulf Coast version) (5 times) – with Frank Dalton
- National Wrestling Alliance
  - NWA World Tag Team Championship (Northeast version) (1 time, inaugural) - with Jackie Fargo
- National Wrestling Federation
  - NWF World Tag Team Championship (2 times) – with Johnny Fargo
- Mid-South Wrestling/NWA Tri-State
  - Mid-South Louisiana Heavyweight Championship (3 times)
  - NWA Brass Knuckles Championship (Tri-State version) (1 time)
  - NWA Louisiana Heavyweight Championship
- NWA Indianapolis
  - NWA World Tag Team Championship (Indianapolis version) (1 time) – with Jackie Fargo
- NWA Mid-America
  - AWA Southern Heavyweight Championship (3 times) – with Frank Dalton (1 time) and Jackie Fargo (2 times)
  - NWA World Tag Team Championship (Mid-America version) (8 times) – with Jackie Fargo
  - NWA (Mid-America) Southern Tag Team Championship (2 times)
  - NWA Mid-America Tag Team Championship (1 time) – with Robert Gibson
  - NWA Mid-America Heavyweight Championship (1 time)
  - NWA World Brass Knuckles Championship (3 times)
- NWA Wrestling Legends Hall of Heroes
  - Inductee (class of 2009)
- Pacific Northwest Wrestling
  - NWA Pacific Northwest Tag Team Championship – with Jim Dalton
- Professional Wrestling Hall of Fame and Museum
  - Inductee (class of 2014)
- Western States Sports
  - NWA Brass Knuckles Championship (Amarillo version) (1 time)
  - NWA Western States Tag Team Championship (2 times) – with Johnny Fargo (1 time) and Hank James (1 time)
- World Wrestling Association
  - WWA World Tag Team Championship (3 times) – with Frank Dillinger (1 time), Sgt. Jacques Goulet (1 time), and Jim Dillinger (1 time)
