= Robert Tyler =

Robert Tyler may refer to:

- Robert Tyler (American football) (born 1965), American football player
- Robert C. Tyler (1832–1865), Confederate general during the American Civil War
- Robert O. Tyler (1831–1874), Union general in the American Civil War
- Robert Tyler (baseball) (born 1995), American baseball pitcher
- Robert Tyler (Confederate Register of the Treasury) (1816–1877), son of United States President John Tyler

== See also ==
- Robert Tyler Davis (1904–1978), American art historian
- Peter Robert Tyler Thorburn (1939–2021), New Zealand rugby union player and coach
- Sir George Robert Tyler, 1st Baronet (1835–1897), baronet and Lord Mayor of London
