= NWA World Tag Team Championship (Northeast version) =

- Antonino Rocca and Miguel Pérez with the championship belt

Details
- Promotion: Manhattan Wrestling Enterprises; Capitol Wrestling Corporation
Statistics
- First champions: Wildman Stevens and Wildman Fargo
- Final champions: Antonino Rocca and Miguel Pérez
- Longest reign: Antonino Rocca and Miguel Pérez (1,524–1,553 days) (Note: The date the championship was abandoned is uncertain, which means Antonino Rocca and Miguel Pérez's reign lasted between 1,524 and 1,553 days.)
- Shortest reign: Wildman Stevens and Wildman Fargo (32 days) (Note: The exact date that Don Fargo and Jackie Fargo won the championship is uncertain, therefore the length of their title reign may be incorrect.)

The Northeast version of the NWA World Tag Team Championship was a professional wrestling championship promoted by Toots Mondt's Manhattan Wrestling Enterprises and the Capitol Wrestling Corporation.

== Reigns ==
=== Reigns ===
Key
No.	Overall reign number
Reign	Reign number for the specific team—reign numbers for the individuals are in parentheses, if different
Days	Number of days held
N/A	Unknown information
(NLT)	Championship change took place "no later than" the date listed
(NET)	Championship change took place "no earlier than" the date listed

No.	Champion	Championship change			Reign statistics		Notes	Ref.
No.	Champion	Date	Event	Location	Reign	Days	Notes	Ref.
1	Wildman Stevens/Don Stevens and Wildman Fargo/Jackie Fargo	February 26, 1957 (NLT)	Manhattan Wrestling Enterprises	New York City, NY	1	32	February 26, 1957 is the date of earliest known title defense.	
2	Antonino Rocca and Miguel Pérez	March 30, 1957	Manhattan Wrestling Enterprises	New York City, NY	1	1,524–1,553	This was two-out-of-three falls match, in which Rocca and Pérez won 2–1.	
—	Deactivated	June 1961 (NET)	—	—	—	—	The championship was abandoned due to undocumented reasons.	
