= Robert B. Davis =

American mathematician

Robert B. Davis (June 23, 1926 – December 21, 1997) was an American mathematician and mathematics educator.

Davis was born in Fall River, Massachusetts. He graduated from MIT with a B.S, M.S, and Ph.D. (1951) in mathematics. He was a professor and researcher at the University of New Hampshire, Syracuse University, the University of Illinois and Rutgers University, where he was named New Jersey Professor of Mathematics Education in 1988. He was one of the founders of the Madison Project, a study of mathematics education which spanned 15 years. The project is named for Madison Junior High School in Syracuse, where it began. The project moved to Webster College near St, Louis, Missouri in 1961.

Davis was the founding editor of The Journal of Mathematical Behavior (originally The Journal of Children's Mathematical Behavior), with Herbert Ginsburg in 1971.

Davis was given the Ross Taylor/Glenn Gilbert National Leadership Award posthumously by the National Council of Supervisors of Mathematics in 1998.

== Selected publications ==
- Davis, R. B. (1964). Discovery In Mathematics: A Text For Teachers. Reading, Massachusetts: Addison-Wesley.
- Davis, R. B. (1984). Learning Mathematics: The Cognitive Science Approach to Mathematics Education. Norwood, New Jersey: Ablex Publishing.
- Davis, R. B.; Vinner, S. (1986). "The notion of limit: Some seemingly unavoidable misconception stages". The Journal of Mathematical Behavior. 5 (3): 281–303.
- Davis, R. B.; Maher, Carolyn A.; Noddings, Nel, eds. (1990). Constructivist Views on the Teaching and Learning of Mathematics. Journal for Research in Mathematics Education Monographs. Vol. 4. Reston, Virginia: National Council of Teachers of Mathematics.
