= Bob David =

Bob David may refer to:

- Bob David (ice hockey)
- Bob David (American football)

== See also ==
- Bob Davids, American baseball researcher and writer
- Bob Davis (disambiguation)
