= Robert Davies =

Robert, Rob or Bob Davies may refer to:

== Politics ==
- Robert Henry Davies (1824–1902), British colonial official, lieutenant governor of the Punjab
- Robert J. Davies (1839–1892), Welsh politician and religious nonconformist
- Rob Davies (politician) (born 1948), minister of trade and industry of South Africa
- Robert Davies (politician) (1918–1967), British Labour politician

== Sports ==
- Robert Davies (footballer, born 1861) (1861–?), Wrexham F.C. and Wales international footballer
- Robert Davies (footballer, born 1863) (1863–?), Druids F.C. and Wales international footballer
- Robert Davies (footballer, born 1869) (1869–?), Chester F.C., Wrexham F.C. and Wales international footballer
- Robert Davies (footballer, born 1876) (1876–?), British footballer
- Idwal Davies (footballer) (Robert Idwal Davies, 1899–1980), Bolton Wanderers F.C. and Wales international footballer
- Robert G. Davies (fl. 1931–1936), footballer for Port Vale and Torquay United
- Rob Davies (footballer) (born 1987), Welsh international footballer for WBA and Worcester City F.C.
- Rob Davies (table tennis) (born 1984), Welsh para sport table tennis player
- Robert Davies (sport shooter) (1876–1916), British Olympic sports shooter
- Bob Davies (1920–1990), American basketball player
- Robbie Davies (1949–2017), British boxer
- Robbie Davies Jr. (born 1989), British boxer

== Antiquaries ==
- Robert Davies (antiquary, died 1710) (1658–1710), Welsh naturalist and antiquary, father of Robert Davies (antiquary, died 1728)
- Robert Davies (antiquary, died 1728) (1685/6–1728), Welsh antiquary
- Robert Davies (antiquary, died 1875) (1793–1875), English lawyer and antiquary

== Other ==
- Robert T. Davies (1849–1916), Canadian businessman and racehorse owner and breeder
- Robert Davies (British Army officer) (1900–1975), British Army officer, recipient of the George Cross
- Robert Davies (bishop) (1913–2002), Australian Anglican bishop
- R. W. Davies (Robert William Davies, 1925–2021), British historian
- Bob Davies (businessman) (born 1948), British businessman
- Robert Davies (priest) (1805–1880), Anglican priest in Australia

== See also ==
- Davies, surname
- Robert Davis (disambiguation)
