= Rob Davies =

Rob Davies may refer to:

- Rob Davies (footballer) (born 1987), Welsh professional footballer
- Rob Davies (politician) (born 1948), South African politician
- Rob Davies (table tennis) (born 1984), Welsh table tennis player

== See also ==
- Robert Davies (disambiguation)
- Rob Davis (disambiguation)
