= Rob Moore =

Rob Moore may refer to:

- Rob Moore (politician) (born 1974), Canadian lawyer and politician
- Rob Moore (American football) (born 1968), American football player
- Rob Moore (field hockey) (born 1981), English field hockey player
- Rob Moore (executive) (born 1963), Esports Executive

== See also ==
- Robert Moore (disambiguation)
