= Carolyn A. Maher =

Professor

Carolyn A. Maher is the Distinguished Professor of Mathematics Education and Director of the Robert B. Davis Institute for Learning. She received the 2022 National Council of Teachers of Mathematics (NCTM) Lifetime Achievement Award.

== Early life and education ==
Maher received an Ed.D. in Mathematics Education (1972), M.Ed. in Education (1965) and B.A. (1962) from Rutgers University with a major in Mathematics Education and a minor in Statistics.

== Career and research ==
Maher worked as an elementary school teacher from 1962-1967 in the Matawan Regional School District, Augusta, and Scotch Plains. In 1992 she became a professor of mathematics education at Rutgers University and became the Distinguished Professor of Mathematics Education in 2007. Her work focuses on different studies of student’s mathematical reasoning and argumentation. Her work was inspired by her prior experience as a teacher and she wanted to understand how students learn to develop their intellectual curiosity and their need to learn. She has given several invited talks throughout the world, including in South Africa, Brazil and Mozambique. Maher's work addresses how to provide equal access to STEM while improving both learning and teaching. She helps teachers with teaching methods that consider student differences and strength and their diversity of backgrounds, language, culture, and ethnicity. Her work has been funded by the National Science Foundation for over three decades.

Maher has served in various professional organizations. From 1998 she has been the editor-in-chief of The Journal of Mathematical Behavior and has been a part of the editorial boards of The British Journal of Educational Studies and the Journal for Research in Mathematics Education. She has been the President for North American Group of the Psychology of Mathematics Education; Chair for the American Education Research Association; and an elected member to the Holmdel Public Schools Board of Education.
