= Robert L. Davis (police chief) =

- Born: 1958 (age 67–68)
- Education: BA in English, San Jose State University, 1985; MA in Public Administration, Golden Gate University, 2003
- Police career
- Department: San Jose Police Department
- Service years: 1980-2010
- Status: Retired
- Rank: Chief of Police

Robert L. "Rob" Davis (born 1958) was the chief of the San Jose Police Department from 2004 to 2010.

== Early life and education ==
Davis was hired by the San Jose Police Department in 1980, and graduated from San Jose State University in 1985 with a Bachelor of Arts in English.

== Tenure as Chief of Police ==
He rose through the ranks to become chief of police in 2004 before retiring in 2010. During his tenure as police chief, he was known for leading a progressive police force, although the force was also criticized for racial profiling and focusing on petty crimes. Davis angered members of the department by not publicly addressing layoffs during his tenure. He was succeeded by police chief Chris Moore. Davis issued stunguns and Axon body cameras to all police officers, and made dispatch based on GPS location instead of assigned beats. Upon his retirement in 2010, Davis stated that he "had no regrets".

== Personal life ==
After his retirement from the police force, Davis became the managing director of West Coast operations for private security firm Hillard Heintze. Davis is a member of the Church of Jesus Christ of Latter-day Saints. He has two children.
