= Bob Davis (Texas politician) =

American politician (1941–2024)

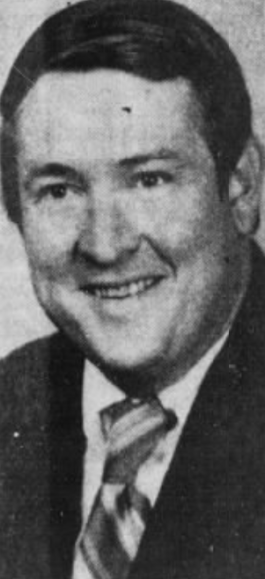
- Davis in 1974

Member of the Texas House of Representatives from the 33-A district
- In office January 9, 1973 – January 11, 1983
- Preceded by: District established
- Succeeded by: District eliminated

Personal details
- Born: Robert Eugene Davis; August 19, 1941 Fort Worth, Texas, U.S.
- Died: December 16, 2024 (aged 83) Irving, Texas, U.S.
- Party: Republican
- Education: Vanderbilt University

Robert Eugene Davis (August 19, 1941 – December 16, 2024) was an American politician. A member of the Republican Party, he served in the Texas House of Representatives from 1973 to 1983.

== Life and career ==
Davis was born in Fort Worth, Texas, the son of William Cecil Davis Sr. and Muriel McCarty. He attended Whitehaven High School, graduating in 1959. After graduating, he attended Vanderbilt University, earning his Bachelor of Engineering degree in 1963 and his law degree in 1966.

Davis served in the Texas House of Representatives from 1973 to 1983.

== Death ==
Davis died at his home in Irving, Texas, on December 16, 2024, at the age of 83.
