= Antonino Rocca =

Italian professional wrestler (1921–1977)

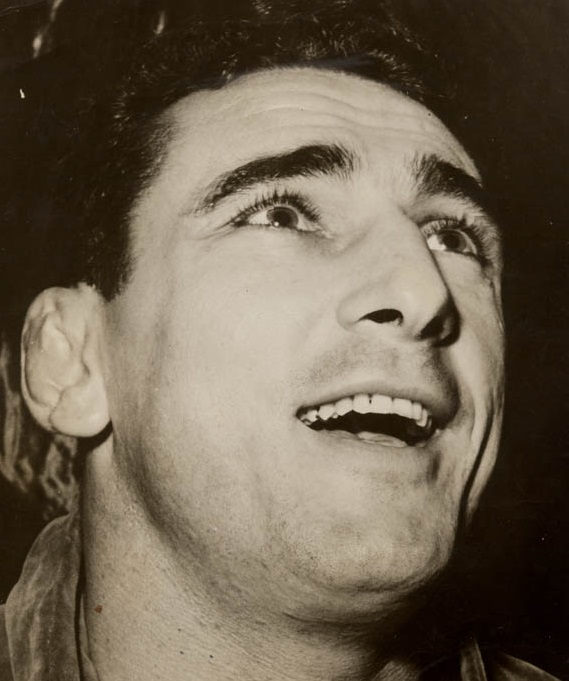
- Rocca in 1956

Personal information
- Born: Antonino Biasetton; 13 April 1921 Treviso, Veneto, Italy
- Died: 15 March 1977 (aged 55) New York City, New York, U.S.

Professional wrestling career
- Ring name(s): Antonino Rocca; Argentina Rocca
- Billed height: 6 ft 0 in (183 cm)
- Billed weight: 224 lb (102 kg)
- Billed from: Argentina
- Trained by: Stanislaus Zbyszko
- Debut: 1942
- Retired: 1976

Antonino Biasetton (13 April 1921 – 15 March 1977) was an Italian-Argentine professional wrestler, better known by his ring name Antonino Rocca. He innovated the "high-flying" style of wrestling in the United States, and was best known for his work with Capitol Wrestling Corporation (CWC), later known as the World Wide Wrestling Federation (WWWF), both as a singles wrestler and in a tag team with Miguel Pérez.

Rocca proved especially popular with Hispanic and Italian audiences in New York, where he was long based. He was a one-time NWA World Tag Team Champion (with Pérez) and the inaugural NWA/WWWF International Heavyweight Champion. He was posthumously inducted into the WWE Hall of Fame as a member of the class of 1995 and the Wrestling Observer Newsletter Hall of Fame in 1996.

== Early life ==
Biasetton was born in Treviso in the Veneto region of Italy in 1921. His family emigrated to Argentina in the mid-1930s when Biasetton was a teenager, and he was later naturalized as an Argentine citizen. Living in Rosario, Santa Fe Province, he participated in several sports as a young man, including soccer, swimming, and rugby. He attended the National University of Rosario, where he studied electrical engineering and was a member of its rugby team.

== Professional wrestling career ==
=== Early career (1945–1949) ===
After being trained by former World Heavyweight Wrestling Champion Stanislaus Zbyszko, Biasetton began wrestling under Buenos Aires promoter Karl Nowina in 1945. He was brought to Texas in the late 1940s by Nick Ellitch, who billed him as Argentina Rocca. In the early 1950s, he held two regionally recognized World Heavyweight Championships while still headlining nationwide, frequently in territories where other wrestlers were the recognized champions.

=== Capitol Wrestling Corporation / World Wide Wrestling Federation (1949–1976) ===
In 1949, Rocca started wrestling in the New York City-area territory for Joseph Raymond "Toots" Mondt, and the Johnston family of promoters, which controlled wrestling at Madison Square Garden, and Mondt owned Rocca's exclusive contract. The territory had been one of the four largest-grossing areas up until the mid-1930s New York, and would later be run by Capitol Wrestling Corporation (CWC, now WWE).

Rocca later formed a tag team with Jose Miguel Pérez in 1957. Together, they captured the NWA World Tag Team Championship, which was the top tag team title used in the CWC, and like so many other titles, was a regional one. They were never defeated after winning this title, but the appellation was abandoned after about five years.

In 1959–60, Rocca worked with Kola Kwariani and under Jack Pfefer, took effective control of the Garden's wrestling office. Kwariani had just broken away from his partnership with Vince McMahon, Sr. Rocca then set the post-World War II record for wrestling-attendance at Madison Square Garden's 49th–50th Street location, drawing 21,950 fans in a singles match against an obscure wrestler named "The Amazing Zuma", also known as "Argentina Zuma", on 2 January 1960, as reported in The New York Times.

This was part of a series of three matches between the two held during a four-month period, when the pair drew, on another night, almost as many fans to the Garden. Rocca had also been provided with new wrestler Bruno Sammartino as a tag team partner. However, when this team failed to sell-out the Garden, the pair was split up to wrestle each other in the hopes that business would pick up, but it did not.

McMahon Sr. eventually took back the New York territory and built it by first featuring "Nature Boy" Buddy Rogers and then, a few years later, the by-then charismatic Sammartino as its champion.

In 1963, the CWC left the NWA when it was renamed the World Wide Wrestling Federation (WWWF). WWE history lists a tournament final to crown the first WWWF World Heavyweight Champion as Buddy Rogers over Rocca on 29 April 1963 in Rio de Janeiro, Brazil, but this tournament is fictitious. Rogers had legitimately held the NWA World Heavyweight Championship, but lost that title to Lou Thesz in Toronto earlier in 1963 in a match – and rematch – ignored by the New York City and Chicago promoters.

After a demotion, and with the arrival of Buddy Rogers as the featured star at the Garden in 1961, within a few years Rocca left the WWWF and briefly set up a competing promotion (supported by Jim Crockett and others) based at the Sunnyside Arena in Queens, New York. In the mid-1970s, he teamed up with Vince McMahon to handle the color commentary on the WWWF's weekly television show. He provided color commentary on WWF Championship Wrestling and All-Star Wrestling from 1972 to 1976, a role later filled by Sammartino.

=== Japan and Puerto Rico (1960s–1976) ===
Rocca was involved as a professional wrestler, but also as a referee in Japan during the late 1960s and early 1970s. He refereed a number of matches for the Japan Pro Wrestling Association (JWA), and later followed Antonio Inoki to New Japan Pro-Wrestling in 1972.

In 1973, he joined the World Wrestling Council (WWC) in Puerto Rico with partner Miguel Pérez. They captured the defunct WWC North American Tag Team Championship on 11 September 1976 by defeating Los Infernos. They lost the championship to Higo Hamaguchi and Gordon Nelson on 16 October.

== Other media ==
Rocca was depicted wrestling Superman on the cover of the Superman No. 155 (August 1962) comic book. The 1976 horror film Alice, Sweet Alice, featuring child actress Brooke Shields, includes Rocca in a bit part. His fame extended into various media outlets, from numerous interviews for national newspapers and magazines to meeting President Richard Nixon to a guest appearance on The Tonight Show Starring Johnny Carson.

== Personal life ==
Maestro Arturo Toscanini, a professional wrestling fan, was good friends with Rocca.

=== Death ===
Rocca died on 15 March 1977 at Roosevelt Hospital in New York City after complications following a urinary infection. His funeral was attended by thousands and made the front page of New York newspapers.

== Legacy ==
Rocca was known for his unique, acrobatic, off-the-ground, flying wrestling style. He is credited with innovating or popularizing several high-flying maneuvers that have since become commonplace, such as the dropkick (which he is claimed to have invented, though that's usually attributed to Abe Coleman or Joe Savoldi), the hurricanrana, the victory roll, the flying body presses, and most notably the Argentine backbreaker rack.

Antonio Inoki (born Kanji Inoki) derived his ring name from Rocca.

== Championships and accomplishments ==
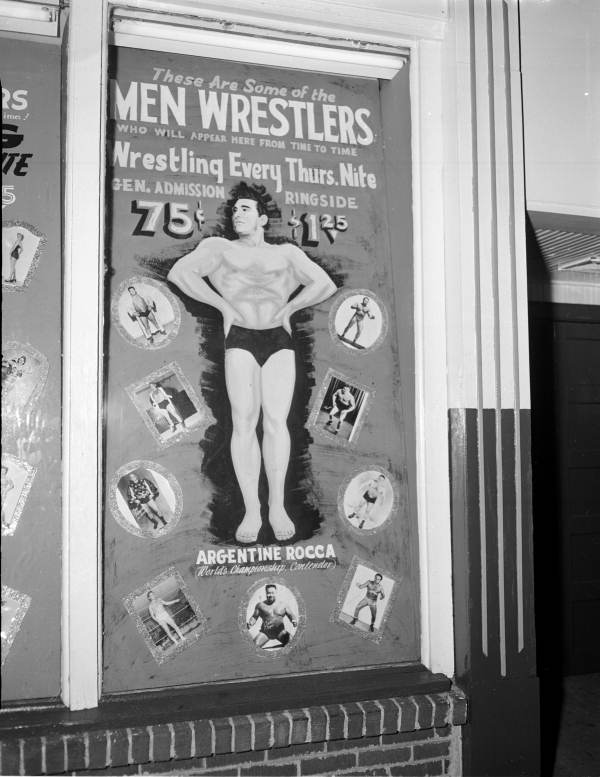
A Jacksonville, Florida, poster advertises Rocca

- Montreal Athletic Commission
  - MAC World Heavyweight Championship (1 time)
- American Wrestling Association (Ohio)
  - AWA World Heavyweight Championship (Ohio version) (1 time)
- Stampede Wrestling
  - Stampede Wrestling Hall of Fame (Class of 1995)
- Capitol Wrestling Corporation/Worldwide Wrestling Federation/World Wrestling Federation
  - NWA World Tag Team Championship (Northeast version) (1 time, final) – with Miguel Pérez
  - NWA/WWWF International Heavyweight Championship (1 time, inaugural)
  - WWF Hall of Fame (Class of 1995)
- Southwest Sports, Inc.
  - NWA Texas Heavyweight Championship (2 times)
- World Wrestling Council
  - WWC North American Tag Team Championship (1 time) – with Miguel Pérez.
- Professional Wrestling Hall of Fame and Museum
  - Class of 2003
- Wrestling Observer Newsletter
  - Wrestling Observer Newsletter Hall of Fame (Class of 1996)
  - Wrestling Observer Newsletter Hall of Fame (2023) - with Miguel Pérez

== See also ==
- List of premature professional wrestling deaths
