= Rob Davis =

Rob Davis may refer to:

- Rob Davis (musician) (born 1947), guitarist and songwriter
- Rob Davis (gridiron football) (born 1968), American gridiron football long snapper
- Rob Davis (politician), Canadian politician in Ontario
- Rob Davis (comics) (born 1954), British comics artist, writer, and editorial illustrator

== See also ==
- Robbie Davis (born 1961), racing jockey
- Robert Davis (disambiguation)
- Rob Davies (disambiguation)
