= Robert Davies (antiquary, died 1728) =

Welsh antiquary (d. 1728)

Robert Davies (1685/86 – 22 May 1728) was a Welsh antiquary and son of fellow antiquary, Robert Davies.

== Early life and education ==
Davies was born on 1685/6 as the son of Robert Davies of Llannerch and his wife, Letitia (née Vaughan). Davies matriculated from Brasenose College, Oxford University on 27 June 1702, aged 16. His father died on 8 July 1710, with his Llannerch and Gwysaney estates passed on to Davies. Davies became High Sheriff of Flintshire.

== Personal life and death ==
Davies married Anne, daughter of John Brockholes of Claughton, Lancaster. Two portraits exist of Davies in Gwysaney. He died on 22 May 1728.

After his death, a notable effigy of him was sculpted by Henry Cheere and placed in St Mary's Church, Mold. The full-length effigy shows Davies in Roman clothing, described as "superb" by Thompson Cooper, a writer for the Dictionary of National Biography. Davies' son, Robert Davies (1710–1763), was a scholarly patron, like his grandfather. He was a warm friend of the Welsh poet Evan Evans, who composed an elegy for Davies III. Davies' grandson, Peter Davies, never married. He died without a will in 1785, and the family's estate and library were divided and inherited by his two sisters.
