= Robert Tyler Davis =

American art historian

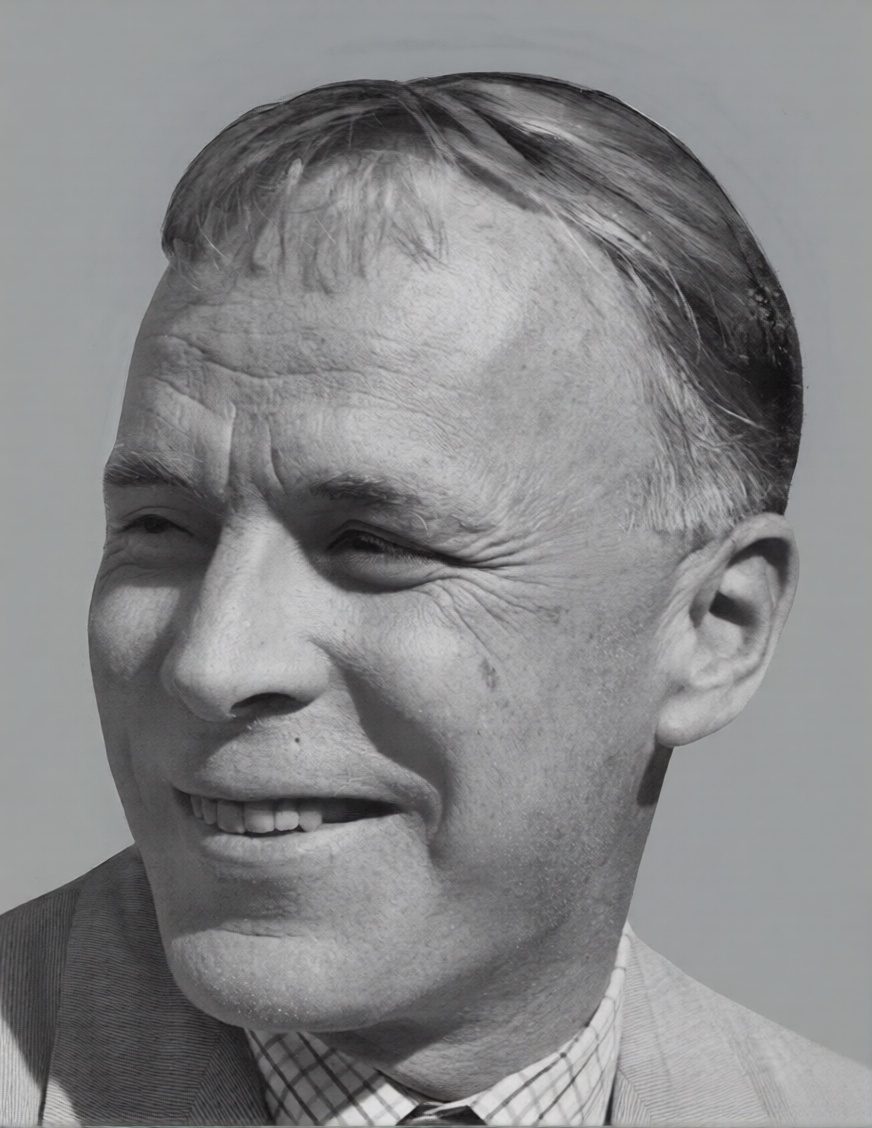
- Davis in 1954
- Born: 1904
- Died: 1978 (aged 73–74)
- Education: Harvard University (AB, AM)

Robert Tyler Davis (1904–1978) was an American art historian, writer and educator. During his lifetime, Davis occupied high ranking positions in several museums and galleries in the United States and Canada. He was Director of Education at the Albright-Knox Gallery, Director at the Portland Art Museum, the Montreal Museum of Fine Arts and the Vizcaya-Dade County Art Museum, now Vizcaya Museum and Gardens. Davis produced several publications including the book Native arts of the Pacific Northwest.

During his tenure at the Albright-Knox Gallery, Davis produced a report funded titled The Art Museum and the Secondary School, it is in this report that the first documented occurrence of the term "visual literacy" is recorded in literature.
