= Bobby Davis (wrestler) =

American professional wrestler (1937–2021)

Personal information
- Born: Robert Davis; October 23, 1937 Columbus, Ohio, U.S.
- Died: January 6, 2021 (aged 83)

Professional wrestling career
- Ring name: Bobby Davis
- Debut: 1956
- Retired: 1966

Robert Davis (born 23 October 1937) was an American professional wrestler and manager. He is known for managing Buddy Rogers in the 1960s, mainly in the World Wide Wrestling Federation.

== Professional wrestling career ==
Davis made his wrestling debut in 1956, working in Ohio for promoter Al Haft after he dropped out of Ohio State University.

He made his debut in New York City for Capitol Wrestling Corporation in 1958, which later became the World Wide Wrestling Federation in 1963.

Davis would manage the Golden Grahams (Eddie Graham and Dr. Jerry Graham) in 1958 and 1959, sometimes fighting in six-tag matches. Around 1960 he started to manage "Nature Boy" Buddy Rogers. Known as "The Elvis Presley of Wrestling."

He retired from wrestling in the late 1960s.

== Personal life ==
Davis was born on 23 October 1937. He died aged 83, on 6 January 2021.

== Championships and accomplishments ==
- Wrestling Observer Newsletter
  - Wrestling Observer Newsletter Hall of Fame (Class of 2024)
