= Professional wrestling in Puerto Rico =

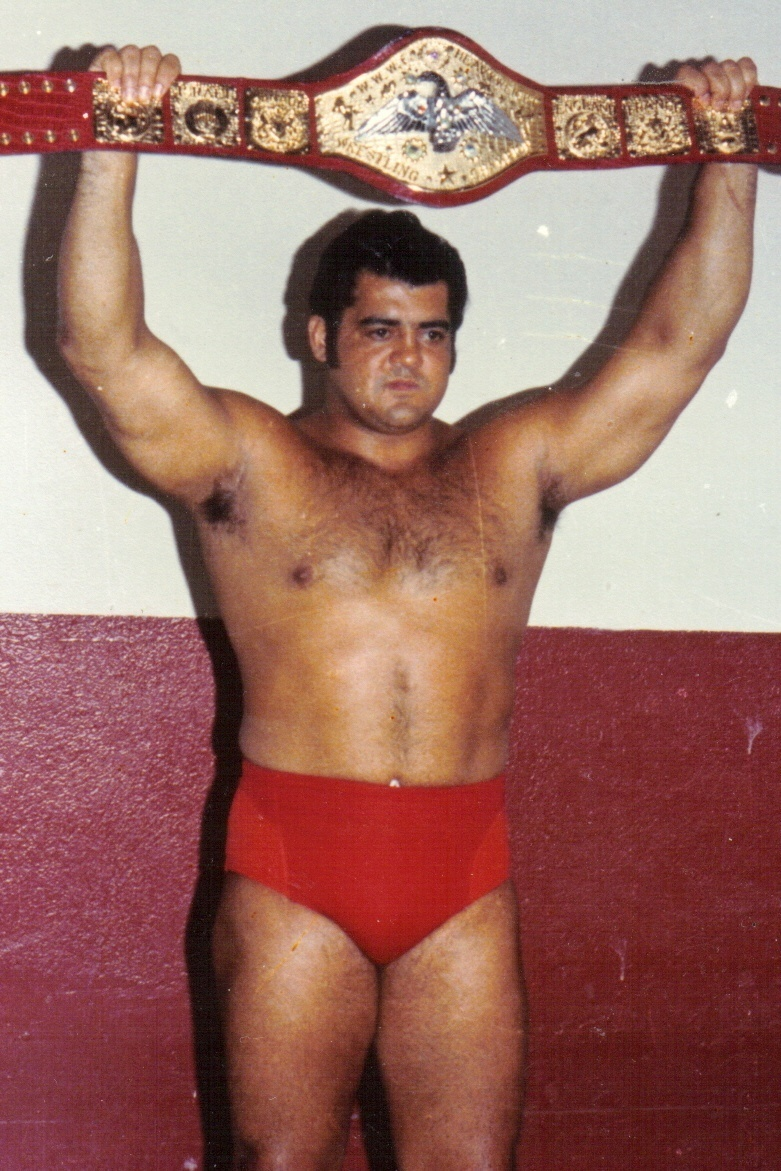
Pedro Morales was the first Latin American in history to win a recognized world heavyweight championship.

Professional wrestling has been considered one of the most popular forms of entertainment in Puerto Rico for more than fifty years. It is considered the highest source of income in the sports entertainment industry on the island; a minor industry within its tertiary sector in its overall economy. After sports commentator José Antonio Géigel and a group of wrestlers founded the first promotion based in Puerto Rico, the discipline has consistently remained being broadcast in local television. Originally a mixture of foreign wrestling styles, the Puerto Rican wrestling style developed into a unique form of performing. Most notably, local promotions relied on unusual matches, often involving foreign objects or odd arenas. Local wrestling is considered to be one of the pillars that contributed to modern hardcore wrestling, being the territory where the first "fire" and "death" matches took place. Local promotions exploited the innovation and held their cards in large stadiums, eventually becoming an element of popular culture. During the course of six decades, Carlos Colón Sr. has developed over 70 scars in his forehead that are product of this method of performing, becoming the main symbol of the style's nature. The storylines in Puerto Rico have historically revolved around the "foreign heel" formula, with local wrestlers obtaining victories over notable figures that include Ric Flair, Harley Race, Hulk Hogan, Terry Funk, Diamond Dallas Page, Scott Hall, Booker T, Samoa Joe and Curt Hennig among several others.

Women's wrestling has been historically inconsistent due to the lack of participants, with the division's championships being activated and inactivated depending on the quorum available. Despite this, some performers have achieved local success, such as Soldelina "La Tigresa" Vargas and "La Rosa Negra" Nilka García. Internationally, there is a stark contrast to this situation, with Puerto Rican women successfully establishing a presence in the major promotions in both the United States and Mexico. Sparse attempts have been made to popularize women's wrestling, including the foundation of women-only promotions. As a popular form of entertainment, professional wrestling has impacted several aspects of Puerto Rican popular culture, including sports, politics and television. Due to its ambiguous status as a form of "sports entertainment", local professional wrestling has been monitored by government commissions that regulate both legitimate sports and spectacles such as cockfighting throughout the years. Led by Carlos Colón Sr. and Victor Jovica, the World Wrestling Council is the oldest active promotion in Puerto Rico. Historically, counter-promotions emerged to challenge WWC's monopoly, with the most successful attempt being made by Víctor Quiñones's International Wrestling Association. The World Wrestling League is the only company that began with an international scope instead of first attempting to establish a local presence. An unorganized independent circuit also operates on a lower tier, confronting problems with clandestine wrestling promotions.

== Puerto Rican professional wrestling style ==
=== Technical approach and elements ===
The Puerto Rican professional wrestling style has been influenced by several countries, beginning with the settlement of local wrestlers in New York during the 1950s Great Migration. Among the first performers to adopt the American style was José Miguel Pérez Sr., who added an aerial element to it during an age where aerial maneuvers were uncommon. This hybrid version became common among Puerto Rican wrestlers that permanently settled in the United States, with Pedro Morales using a cannonball dive and Gilberto "Gypsy Joe" Meléndez being the first to jump successfully from the top of a steel cage onto an opponent, a move that later became associated with Jimmy Snuka. Morales' style was also influenced by his gimmick of "Latin brawler", heavily relying on stiff kicks and punches as well. These performers were among the first to introduce this way of performing to Puerto Rico during the early years of local professional wrestling. During the following years, more variations were introduced, particularly due to freelancers traveling abroad and learning different practices. The introduction of Mexican wrestlers in the 1960s slightly promoted the use of more aerial maneuvers, but the style did not become widespread. Similarly, Cuban wrestlers brought in after the Cuban Revolution brought their own style. However, Carlos Colón Sr. was among the most influential in shaping a local idiosyncrasy. He originally intended to work in the Mexican style that he learned early in his career, but being unable to fully adapt to it, decided to mix it with the traditional American variant. Later, after spending several years wrestling in Canada, he learned a more aggressive or "stiffer" approach than the one seen in American wrestling, while also learning the grappling practices used there.

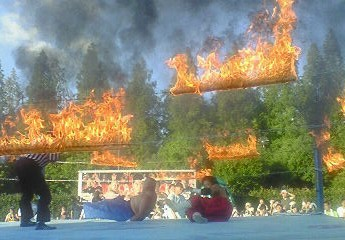
Fire was first used in a professional wrestling match at Capitol Sports Promotions. "Death matches" (pictured) originated in Puerto Rico and became highly popular in Japan.

Colón ultimately decided to further elevate the aggression of the "stiff" variant and combined it with the other styles, a practice that was quickly adopted by most of the Puerto Rican performers during the 1970s and 1980s. This version, which became the early forerunner to the modern Puerto Rican style, relied on heavy hits in a manner similar to its Japanese counterpart, but was more dependent on blading (the use of a blade to simulate an open injury) and the use of foreign objects to maximize the spectacle. The local circuit became notorious for its gimmick matches, and is credited with the introduction of fire as an element in professional wrestling. In subsequent years, the highly publicized feud between Colón and Abdullah the Butcher became recognized as one of the cornerstones in the creation of hardcore wrestling, having toured several of the National Wrestling Alliances territories and placing bloody performances. Their rivalry gained such momentum that it was commercialized with the release of a set of action figures in a series known as "Greatest Grudge Matches". A second aspect of the Puerto Rican style was subsequently introduced when locals became mainstream visitors in Mexican lucha libre promotions during the second half of the 1980s and early 1990s.

While wrestlers such as Johnny Rivera had continued the aerial maneuvers of Pérez and his contemporaries, the re-introduction of Mexican elements also brought in the serial chaining of grappling moves and some of its typical maneuvers such as the hurricanrana. These were subsequently blended into the prevalent style imposed by Colón and his predecessors, with also the inclusion of some high-risk aerial moves innovated locally, such as Miguel Pérez Jr.'s back flip senton over the top rope towards an opponent outside the ring. Among the first wrestlers to perform in the contemporary style were Ray González, Jesús Castillo and Juan Rivera, known professionally as Savio Vega, who also added some elements from Japanese wrestling following the creation of Víctor Quiñones's W*ING promotion and his previous work at Frontier Martial-Arts Wrestling (FMW), which featured Puerto Rican factions and was responsible for introducing the local style to a new public. Prior to this, Atsushi Onita had imported the concept of the "death match" from Puerto Rico to Japan, becoming successful in FMW. With the creation of the International Wrestling Association and its developmental contract with the World Wrestling Federation, now known as World Wrestling Entertainment (WWE), some of the blading was reduced, generally reserved as a shock factor for bigger events and eventually being dropped altogether. However, the other elements of the Puerto Rican style have remained unchanged, except for the occasional influence of the "sports entertainment" formula during storylines, being passed down to the current generations of wrestlers developed by the IWA and WWC. However, the World Wrestling League has chosen to exclude blading from its events, only conserving the stiff approach and aerial maneuvers.

=== Storyline structure ===
The most common storyline format used in Puerto Rico involves the "foreign heel" formula. This began during the early years of local professional wrestling, when there was direct competition between the emergent local promotions and more established foreign competition that imported its product. In the 1970s, the World Wrestling Council adopted it as its main creative tendency. The promotion began to fully exploit this by introducing Lawrence Shreve, a Canadian performer more commonly known as "Abdullah the Butcher", as the first WWC World Heavyweight Champion. Portrayed as a wild and violent foreigner, he was billed as having won the belt in a fictional tournament held in Japan. However, this was part of an angle to elevate Colón to main event status by winning the title three days after its introduction. From that point onwards, he was consistently portrayed as a "Puerto Rican patriot" and a "sports hero". Colón sold this gimmick by adopting "Soy Boricua" by Bobby Valentín as his theme song. WWC brought in established wrestlers from the United States, Canada and Japan, adopting a formula where they would win the championship by employing illegal tactics, only to lose it back to him in a bloody match to conclude the feud. In order to further sell, they employed a second tactic which consisted of bringing performers that were considerably muscular and tall, promoting "David vs. Goliath" feuds. After establishing Colón as a top seller, WWC decided to focus on improving the credibility of the young WWC World Heavyweight Championship.

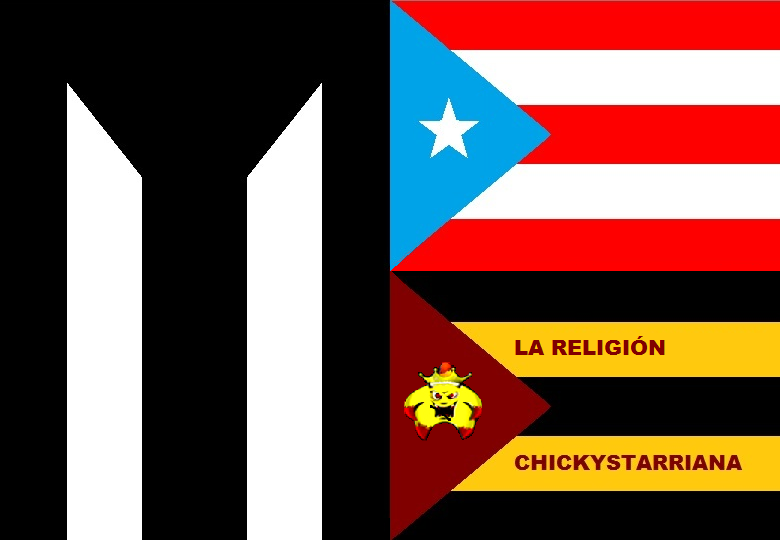
Even heel characters have patriotic undertones, seen here in the flags hoisted by Ricky Banderas in IWA.

The promotion did so by bringing in the holder of the NWA World Heavyweight Championship to wrestle in several cards, where it was booked as an "undefeated" adversary, always retaining against a local performer or wrestling to a time limit draw. After building this reputation, WWC brought in Ric Flair and placed him in a feud for the WWC World Heavyweight Championship. Flair was a major main event performer in the United States and was brought in as a foreigner that only wanted to win the title in order to dispose of it afterwards. During promotional videos, he claimed that it was "unworthy of being called a World Heavyweight Championship", a distinction that "only the NWA World Heavyweight Championship [deserved]". The ensuing match was promoted as being "larger than the World" and to crown the "Undisputed Champion of the Universe", with a steel cage being added as a stipulation. The result marked the first time that a NWA Champion lost in Puerto Rico, exponentially raising Colón's popularity. Afterwards, WWC continued to exploit the foreign heel formula, but added the element of storyline injuries that resulted in the title being held up, resulting in a final match for the vacant belt.

This pattern was continued until 1987, when Colón decided to lose cleanly to Hercules Ayala, signaling the beginning of a new format, in which local heel characters would be able to outpace the foreign wrestlers. This was the norm throughout the next decade, until Carly Colón made his in-ring debut. Subsequently, WWC brought in established foreign talents again, placing him over wrestlers like Ramón Álvarez, Curt Hennig, Horace Hogan, Konnan and Jerry Flynn. Shortly afterwards, the format was also reused to promote Eddie Colón, who was booked in wins over Rey Mysterio Jr. and Kid Kash. During this timeframe, the International Wrestling Association also used the strategy to further the careers of emerging talents, Germán Figueroa and Gilbert Cosme (also known as "Ricky Banderas"), who bested Super Crazy, Diamond Dallas Page and Scott Hall among others in their route to becoming main event performers. Since then, the local promotions have continued to employ this tactic, with the latest notable example taking placing at the IWA's Golpe de Estado 2010, where both Dennis and Juan "Savio Vega" Rivera went over Daniel Bryan on the same night. Bryan was brought in as the defending IWA Puerto Rico Heavyweight Champion, while being contracted to WWE and serving as the first contender to the WWE United States Championship. This tendency is also seen in tag team competition, with examples including Thunder and Lightning defeating The Dudley Boyz and "Los Dueños de la Malicia" defeating The Latin American Xchange.

== Commissions and regulation ==
The first government entity to regulate professional wrestling was the Comisión de Boxeo y Lucha Libre Profesional del Estado Libre Asociado de Puerto Rico (lit. "Boxing and Professional Wrestling Commission") which also covered both amateur and professional forms of boxing, which being a legitimate combat sport remained the main focus of the commission. By the early 2000s a revision to the regulations of professional wrestling was being discussed, however, this plan was fully abandoned when the commission was disbanded and professional wrestling was assimilated into the recreation division of the Puerto Rico Department of Sports and Recreation (DRD). Despite this, former commissioners Ismael Van Drake, Hugo Duarte and Héctor González remained tied to the business by appearing in angles for the IWA and WWC. Following the dissolution of this entity the practice of professional wrestling was loosely sanctioned as a form of entertainment for a period of nearly a decade. However, in 2007 a new regulation was drafted and approved, the document known as Reglamento de Espectáculos de Combate (lit. "Combat Spectacle Requirements") also extended to forms of martial arts. A joint effort between the DRD and Puerto Rico Department of Treasury (DH) resulted in the issue of several licenses and the normalization of the tax statements of independent companies. The effort was led by the president of the relevant subdivision of the DRD, the Comisión de Seguridad en la Recreación y el Deporte (lit. "Commission for Safety in Recreation and Sports"), led by Osvaldo Rivera Cianchini. On June 5, 2007, the DRD concluded the first phase of a broad investigation into the licenses of several wrestlers, resulting in fines ascending to several thousands of dollars. In 2011, the commission was revived with Miguel Laureano, son of José Laureano, serving as its new director. A new set of requirements was proposed in November 2011, which forced professional wrestlers to undergo yearly tests for blood-transmitted diseases in order to receive and renew their licenses. However, the approval of this document was stalled and Laureano handed it over to his successor Ramón Dasta. In 2013, the commission was disbanded and integrated into the DRD's Security Commission which then organized a committee led by former basketball referee Juan "Pucho" Figueroa to draft the latest revision to the regulations. The new proposal also pursued mandatory anabolic steroids tests as an addition to the ones performed to detect infectious diseases.

== History ==
=== The early years; Géigel and other pioneers ===
Professional wrestling was introduced to Puerto Rico during the second half of the 20th century. However, what was seen of the discipline was through television programming imported by foreign companies and rarely featured Puerto Rican wrestlers in notable performances. No actual events or cards were regularly organized in Puerto Rico until the 1960s, with the few exceptions focusing exclusively in foreign talents and only occurring on an average of twice a year. One of the first local promoters was José Antonio Géigel, a sports commentator, who in 1960 joined a group of wrestlers led by a Puerto Ricans Tomás Marín and "El Eléctrico", who had learned to wrestle abroad, and completed by Eddie Salas, King Vadu, Wito el Águila, El Terrible Cardona, El Coyote López, Ché Torres, El Verdugo, Goliath and Mr. Crotona. The promotion remained nameless, however, it managed to negotiate and secure television rights to Telecadena Perez Perry (WKVM-11). Shortly afterwards, it was acquired by Riverita, a promoter who brought in Pito Rivera Monge, a radio host that began narrating the television programming. After one year, the promotion was bought by Arturo Mendoza, a foreign promoter that resided in Puerto Rico. Under Mendoza, the company saw an influx of other Latin American talent, headed by a "El Tigre" Pérez, Fu Ling Chang, Maravilla, Dr. Black, El Gran Toledo and José "La Muerte Vengadora" Velázquez. However, Mendoza confronted difficulties and was forced to sell the promotion to Joe Romero. Under Romero the company experienced a severe drop in popularity. This was due to a promotional model that included bringing in several wrestlers from the United States including "The Tolos Brothers" Chris and John Tolos, Pampero Firpo, Moose Cholak and The Fabulous Kangaroos, sidelining the local talent. Despite this, Marín remained a constant in the roster throughout this timeframe while performing as a heel (villain), winning the Television Championship once and the Caribbean Tag Team Championship twice along El Dragón. By the end of Romero's run, the only two Hispanic wrestlers remaining were Huracán Castillo and Black Georgie and the strategy backfired, resulting in an economic collapse in 1966.

This was followed by a hiatus of several months, during which no live wrestling was organized in Puerto Rico. Clerence Lutrall and Eddie Graham, North American promoters of L&G Promotions, attempted to exploit this by bringing in foreign talent and holding some cards, but failed to establish their presence despite offering regular events. Due to their lack of attractive local wrestlers, L&G Promotions brought in José Lothario and promoted him as "Puerto Rico's Adopted Son". The Latin American talent was salvaged by "La Amenaza Roja" Pedro Godoy and another sports commentator, René Molina. Eventually, Mendoza returned to work in Puerto Rico's west coast and remained active until the mid-1970s, when he left the country. Isidoro García Stadium became a frequent venue for professional wrestling and Canal 5 in Mayagüez broadcast the programming. Wrestlers that became known during this run include Barrabás, Gato Montés, Lotario, El Gato Negro, Castro Salvaje, Judas, Jet Delgado, El Vikingo, Hugo Savinovich, Enoc Girón, Vampiresa, Sammy Rodríguez, El Profe, Al Quiñones and El Beautiful Charlie. Other companies included King Wrestling and National Wrestling, organized by Campeón Escalera and Galán. During this period, championships were not as important as they have become and a series of them existed, also including the World Heavyweight and Puerto Rico Singles Championship. Occasionally, foreign champions were brought in to defend their titles, which also resulted in some of the local talent winning these. By the mid-1970s, these promotions had closed. This caused some of the local talent to leave professional wrestling and sell their gear out of frustration. Three of the local wrestling families became involved in the discipline during this time, including the other members of the Marín clan, El Perfumado, El Coloso Marín and Pulpo Marín; the Castillo clan, formed by Huracán Castillo Sr. and Jesús Castillo and the Pérez clan consisting of Miguel Perez Sr. and his eponymous son.

=== Capitol Sports Promotions, World Wrestling Council ===
In 1973, Colón and Victor Jovica founded a promotion known as Capitol Sports Promotions and served as shareholders along Gorilla Monsoon. Capitol Sports made its television show a cornerstone in its marketing strategy. Súperestrellas de la Lucha Libre has remained on the air since the promotion's inception in 1973 first appearing in Telecadena Pérez Perry, before being acquired by Teleonce and its sister network WSTE-DT, and airing on Sunday's primetime slot at 6:00 in the evening. Afterwards, the show moved to Telemundo where it began a transition to the 10:00 A.M. slot on Saturday mornings. Súperestrellas de la Lucha Libre eventually moved to WAPA-TV, where it was given four weekly hours, airing its show from 11:00 A.M. to 1:00 P.M. on Saturdays and Sundays. A local newspaper, El Imparcial, served as their mainstream media connection. However, after more than a decade with this schedule, WAPA-TV decided to shorten the program, removing two weekly hours, now being aired 12:00 to 1:00 P.M. during the weekends. After being unknown during its start, WWC heavily relied on its local talents. Besides Colón, their roster featured José Rivera, Miguel Pérez, Hércules Ayala and José Huertas-González. Capitol Sports also absorbed the foreign wrestlers that had established residence in Puerto Rico, such as Huracán Castillo and Maravilla and Raoul "Maravilla" Castillo. When WWC began hosting live tours, the company focused in the main island's rural municipalities. This proved to be a successful approach, since the lack of competition resulted in sold out stadiums throughout the region. Pérez was the main Puerto Rican star, joined by a young Colón.

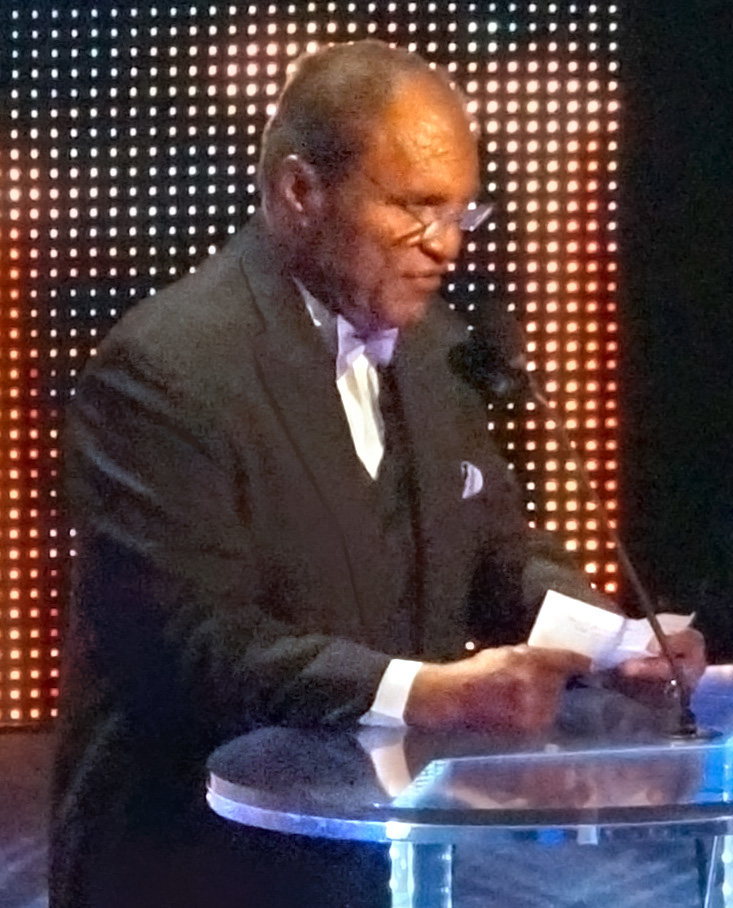
Carlos Colón in 2014

In order to directly compete with L&G Promotion, which had a roster that included Dusty Rhodes, Mike Graham, Pak Song, Bill Watts, Ron Fuller, Buddy Roberts, Terry Brown, Les Thornton, Greg Valentine, Jerry Brisco, Don Muraco and Dory Funk, Capitol Sports began relying on gimmick matches. Among the promotional stunts featured during this timeframe was Victor, a bear trained to wrestle, who mainevented a card against Gil Hayes. Colón, Eddie Gilbert and El Vikingo also wrestled Victor. A similar strategy was the introduction of short wrestlers or "Minis" to Puerto Rico, which began with performers Little Bobo, Tom Thumb, Kid Chocolate and Billy the Kid. Female wrestler also debuted, including Sherry Lee and Kathy O' Day. The promotion also imported talents from Pedro Martínez's International Wrestling Association. In the mid-1970s, Capitol Sports contracted El Santo, with both Colón and the company being featured in a film, La Noche de San Juan: El Santo en Oro Negro. Pérez remained the main local talent, feuding with Jerry Graham over the CSP Puerto Rico Heavyweight Championship. He and Colón were also pushed as a team, winning the CSP North American Tag Team Championship from Bruce Swayze and Jim Dalton and feuding with The Assassins. Meanwhile, Don Serrano, Ted Oates, José Rivera and Julio "El Rayo" López completed the cards offered by the promotion. Colón was systematically built as the new star in the company, with Ox Baker, Luke Graham and Ernie Ladd being recruited for angles involving the North American Title. Capitol Sports also managed to contract what had been one of L&G Promotion's top talents, José Lothario. Capitol then entered a working agreement with Dominicana de Espectáculos, which resulted in a talent exchange that brought in Jack Veneno and El Puma to Puerto Rico. As a product of this, Colón also toured the Dominican Republic and even performed as a heel in a match where he teamed with Masambula to challenge Mil Máscaras and Veneno. The partnership also migrated to the United States, where Huertas-González defeated Veneno on December 20, 1976. Another wrestler pushed was Julio López, who became known as "Barrabás" and feuded with Pérez. Colón continued rising, this time defeating Dick Steinborn for an imported Junior Heavyweight Championship. During this timeframe, South America produced more wrestlers which resulted in the introduction of Vikingo, Salvador Pérez and Ciclón Sudamericano, who were booked for the North American Tag Team Championships.

The Canadian and independent circuits also served a main source of foreign talent, with the inclusion of performers such as “Cowboy” Bob Ellis, Tor Kamata, Odd Job Tosh Togo, Dick Steinborn, The Infernos, The Kangaroos, Pampero Firpo, Toru Tanaka, Higo Hamaguchi, Gordon Nelson, Antonino Rocca, Bruno Sammartino, Hartford Love, Jim Dalton, Bruce Swayze, Daniel Martel, Afa & Sika, Jack Evans and Larry Sharpe. Among these was Abdullah the Butcher, a wrestler that had feuded with Colón at Stampede Wrestling in the early 1970s and that was recruited in 1978. The feud was an immediate hit in Puerto Rico, producing several high profile and violent matches. As a monster heel, he was booked as the antithesis of the fan friendly Colón, growing to become the most popular villain of the time. This began a series of stipulation matches, which brought in elements like foreign objects, barbwire and interventions in order to emphasize the violence of the feud. The rivalry, which included the CSP World Heavyweight Championship being traded back and forth between them, was so popular that it was even covered in the mainstream news outlets. Several story line injuries were created in order to promote these matches, including a spot where Colón was temporarily blinded after ammonia was thrown into his eyes. Other foreign talent that visited Capitol Sports during the 1970s includes Cowboy Bob Ellis, Eric The Red, The Samoans, Ox Baker, Kendo Kimura, the Martel Family, Dutch Mantel, Hartford Love and Ernie Ladd. After his initial run, Miguel Pérez served mostly a tag team wrestler.

In the 1980s, Capitol Sports joined the National Wrestling Alliance, becoming the most prominent territory in the Caribbean region. After Colón became a member of the NWA Board, an influx of established wrestlers began performing in Puerto Rico. A variety of NWA champions began being booked in the promotion's events, including Dusty Rhodes, Harley Race, Jack Brisco, Terry Funk, Dory Funk, Giant Baba, Tommy Rich, Kerry Von Erich and Ronnie Garvin. Among them, Ric Flair proved to be the most successful, becoming instrumental in raising Colón's credibility a titlist and being involved in the distinction of "Universal" being granted to the CSP World Heavyweight Championship. Unlike the previous foreign champions, Flair willingly helped establish Colón, later claiming that he enjoyed his stay in Puerto Rico. The promotion also brought in other attractions to boost assistance, such as André the Giant. During this timeframe, the promotion was being consistently rated in the global top five, reaching the third position among the Americas. Hércules Ayala was the promotion's secondary star, being booked in matches for the Puerto Rico Heavyweight Championship and winning several secondary championships during a run that included wins over Randy Savage. Ayala and Pedro Morales were among the few wrestlers outside of Colón to gain matches against NWA World Champion Ric Flair. In the Mid-1980s, the creative line took a sudden turn and Colón recruited Abdullah to join him in order to wrestle with Stan Hansen and Frank Goodish, known professionally as "Bruiser Brody". However, this alliance was short-lived: Colón abandoned a cage match and Abdullah was ambushed inside of it, reigniting their feud. The emergence of the promotion also resulted in the rise of high-profile local talent in the midcard. The most prominent secondary feud of this time was between Huertas González and "Chicky Starr" José Laureano. This began in an angle in which González was portrayed as Laureano's teacher, only for the latter to turn after claiming that he was being held back. Their feud was featured throughout the archipelago, peaking at Aniversario 1985, where Huertas-González won a "mask vs. hair" match. It continued throughout the remainder of the decade, with Laureano also serving the manager of several wrestlers that were brought as adversaries to Huertas-González. The tag team division saw the emergence of teams like The Medics and The Invaders. Attempting to continue a degree of innovation, CSP began a main storyline feud between Colón and Ayala, which remains one of the most notable in the promotion's history.

Now reduced to a midcard role, Miguel Peréz wrestled his last match along his son, Miguel Pérez Jr., who along Jesús Castillo and Ricky Santana served a new generation of performers that obtained the midcard titles. Despite never being promoted to the top of the card in Capitol, Pérez Jr. unsuccessfully challenged Ric Flair for the NWA World Heavyweight Championship at Aniversario 1986. Through the rest of the year, Colón remained the main focus of the promotion, going through a series of undefeated streaks. The Universal Heavyweight Championship was occasionally vacated, including a period were a tournament was held to crown a new champion. However, this only served as a tactic to improve the number of reigns claimed by Colón, who went on to win the title in the final. Ayala was stripped of the belt after a backstage segment, with Colón retaking his role. Ronnie Garvin was brought in and booked to win the championship, dropping it back in a rematch. On April 14, 1988, Colón defeated Harley Race, whom he had previously wrestled to a 60-minute draw at Aniversario 1983. On July 17, 1988, Huertas-González summoned Goodish backstage to have a discussion. After a fight ensued, Huertas-González stabbed Goodish in a lung. While Colón and a doctor tended to Goodish, Huertas-González entered into another confrontation, this time with Jovica, who was trying to prevent him from exiting the building. Several Puerto Rican wrestlers and some foreign talents led by Juan Rivera and Tony Atlas, have stated that Huertas-González entered the locker room with something wrapped inside a towel, which they believe was a knife. While Goodish was transported to a hospital, Huertas-González managed to exit the premises, changing clothes before the police arrived and returning to the scene. Goodish died while undergoing a second operation that night. After the testimonies were gathered, a trial followed, where Huertas-González alleged self-defense. The wrestlers present received subpoenas for a first date, which was postponed. However, the subpoenas for the second date were delivered late, which resulted in several foreign wrestlers missing the trial, while most if the other wrestlers refused to do so due to Huertas González's position within the promotion. Colón testified on the defense's behalf. It was established that both wrestlers had been involved in confrontations for over a decade, due to Goodish deviating from a script while both worked for the WWWF. The judge presiding the case ruled that it had been self-defense, with Huertas-González being released without serving a sentence.

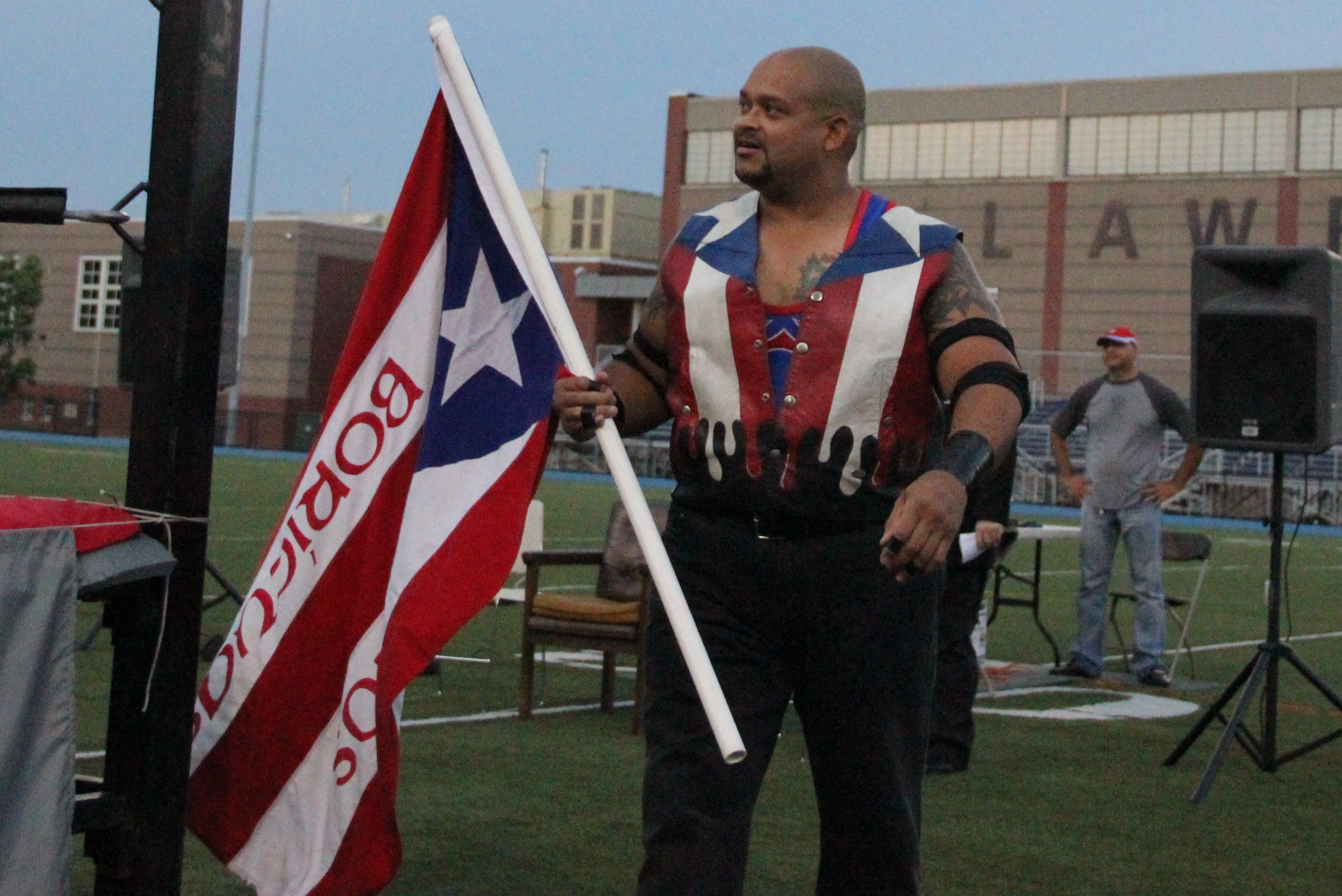
Juan Rivera, also known as T.N.T. and Savio Vega, was a main character in the IWA-WWC rivalry and a key figure in the establishment of the WWA.

Prior to the event, Capitol Sports had planned to sell pay per view events to the United States' audience, but this was aborted as a consequence and never reconsidered. The incident resulted in a period during which the promotion lost support from the fan base, losing most of its previous acquisitive power. Several high-profile international wrestlers refused to work in the promotion as a form of protest. In an aggressive marketing campaign Dino Bravo, Dick Murdoch and Ron Garvin were brought to serve as challengers for the Universal Heavyweight Championship. During the initial stage of the boycott, Capitol brought Steve Strong and built him with a "satanic" gimmick, placing him over Colón to win the title. This storyline was extended and concluded with two additional reigns in Colón's record. Leo Burke was given the next run, serving as a transitional champion. By this time, Juan Rivera, then known as "T.N.T." was feuding with him in the midcard, gathering significant fan support. He would be given a title run on February 9, 1990, with his win being boisterously cheered by the crowd. However, Capitol's creative team decided to return to Colón as holder, with Abdullah the Butcher shortly holding the belt to facilitate the change. Rivera was given a heel turn and feuded for the Universal Heavyweight Championship. However, his run in the main event finished with a 60-minute draw against Colón. This marked the final stage of Rivera's initial run in Capitol, with him eventually leaving the company and joining the World Wrestling Federation. During the following years, Colón would continue as the promotion's top star, gathering more reigns over Greg Valentine and Leo Burke.

Following the fallout from the Goodish incident, some of the local main event talents decided to distance themselves from CSP. Chicky Starr and Hercules Ayala joined Gloria Uribe and Hugo Savinovich in 1991, headlining the events of the Americas Wrestling Federation (AWF), a promotion that also managed to recruit more of CSP's roster. Despite this, the AWF folded two years after its foundation. CSP integrated women's wrestling into its programming, with the CSP Women's Championship being traded among foreign wrestlers until Soldelina "La Tigresa" Vargas first won it in 1992, becoming the top female performer. She held the title for a prolonged time period, until the division became inactive. By 1993, Colón had won the Universal Heavyweight Championship on 15 different occasions. After managing to stabilize the economic losses, he decided to retire, but ultimately returned following a sharp decline in sales. During this timeframe, CSP brought in Greg Valentine to hold the championship as a transitional champion while they built the next local main event talent. Valentine retained the title for several months, defeating Huertas-González regularly. The promotion's booking staff wanted to promote Ray González to fill the vacant position, however, Colón was hesitant to promote a young wrestler, fearing that he would leave the company like Rivera. On April 24, 1994, he allowed González to defeat Valentine to win the Universal Heavyweight Championship, but his run was short and he failed to become popular with the public due to being portrayed as a weak champion. After dropping the belt to Dutch Mantell, González was demoted to the midcard, with Colón returning to the main event. He remained the top local talent during the next years, feuding with Nelson Frazier Jr. and Ramón Álvarez, concluding with his 19th reign as champion. Jesús Castillo and Milton Adomo served as transitional champions following these storylines. Despite managing to survive, Capitol Sports Promotions went bankrupt and reorganized its assets under a new name, World Wrestling Council.

In the first half of 1996, the World Wrestling Association emerged in Puerto Rico, becoming the direct competition to WWC. The booking for the promotion was done by Félix López and Juan Rivera, who became the first WWA World Heavyweight Champion by defeating Goldust on August 31, 1996. Besides Rivera and Dustin Rhodes, the promotion featured the participation of other WWF talents including Jake Roberts, Fred Ottman, The Undertaker, Triple H, Bam Bam Bigelow, Charles Wright and Yokozuna. Its roster was completed by other talents from the independent circuits of Puerto Rico and Florida. In December 1996, the WWA held a match between Rico Casanova and Sid Vicious for the WWF Championship in a show held at Arecibo, Puerto Rico. On April 23, 1997, Rivera defeated Ramón Álvarez to win the WWA Puerto Rico Heavyweight Championship. However, the promotion closed in June of that year. The last of the Colón-Abdullah matches took place in 1997, when Colón won a "loser leaves Puerto Rico" contest. This banishment was short-lived, since he was brought in again and both teamed again one last time. By this time, Colón's popularity had started flailing and González was again promoted to the main event scene after performing several years in the midcard. WWC also contracted Laureano again and resumed the feud with Huertas-González. Despite this, he was later used to enhance the career of Ray González. A storyline was created where Colón would train González and help him win the Universal Championship a second time. He dropped the championship to Milton Adomo by accepting a challenge that Colón opposed. This marked the beginning of Ray González's first heel turn. After blaming Colón for losing the championship, he defeated all of the midcard face (fan favorite) wrestlers. Eventually Colón and González entered a feud and exchanged the title twice. González migrated to a rivalry with Pierroth, during which he defeated the Mexican luchador in hair vs. mask and loser leaves town matches. The Colón-González feud was immediately resumed and continued throughout 1999, with both once again exchanging reigns. Concurrently, Carly Colón was introduced to the public as a camera man. An angle to integrate him to the roster soon followed, with González slapping him after learning of his identity, leading to a series of confrontations.

=== IWA vs. WWC; legitimate rivalries ===
During the 2000s, most of the angles and storylines seen in the Puerto Rican circuit were based on actual rivalries and animosity between local promotions. Following the reorganization of Capitol Sports Promotions into the World Wrestling Council, one of its main shareholders, Víctor Quiñones, left Puerto Rico and joined Japan's Frontier Martial-Arts Wrestling. In that country, he eventually became an associate with Micky Ibaragi in order to begin his own promotion, Wrestling International New Generation (W*ING). He led the company into a radical storyline approach, even referencing the Goodish incident by bringing in Ray "Hercules" Fernandez and booking him as the "Super Invader", an "assassin" character. This innovative style was carried over to Quiñones' other promotion, IWA Japan, which opened two months after W*ING closed and continued with the "extreme" booking. In 1999, he returned to Puerto Rico and gathered several local wrestlers to form a new promotion, which was also called International Wrestling Association. The other shareholders, Carlos Colón Sr. and Victor Jovica, attempted to obtain his investment in Capitol, but never offered any money, aborting the attempt. The IWA subsequently entered into a deal with World Wrestling Entertainment to become a developmental territory, which saw an influx of foreign wrestlers entering it, as well as the members of Los Boricuas. Despite technically competing for the wrestling market, both promotions avoided conflict until Juan Rivera was contracted by IWA and was sued by WWC over the ownership of the "T.N.T." character, that he had used in Capitol Sports in the late 1980s and early 1990s. In the first storyline jab between them, Rivera avoided the legal case by simply renaming the character El Hombre Dinamita (lit. "The Dynamite Man") with his attire and overall gimmick remaining unchanged.

In 2002, the IWA responded by recruiting Ray González, who after being involved in a monetary dispute for six months left WWC. Known as "Rey Fénix", Gonzalez served as fold to Germán Figueroa and Gilbert Cosme, helping to establish them as main attractions in local wrestling. In May 2003, Rivera and Eddie Colón had a legitimate discussion when they casually coincided in a restaurant. IWA responded to the event by having Armando Gorbea read a purported fan letter that was signed by someone named "Eddie" to the crowd. In June 2003, Carly Colón signed a developmental contract with World Wrestling Entertainment. The following month in the tour to promote Summer Attitude 2003, Daniel García Soto claimed in a segment that he had confirmed the arrival of the "son of a former world champion" and "legend that is universally recognized" to the IWA, which was heavily implied to be Colón, but actually served as a plot devise to introduce David Flair. Before the identity was revealed, Colón's music was played over the sound system, only for the crowd to be told by Rivera that they should avoid "acting like morons". After Huertas-González joined the IWA, WWC referenced the death of Goodish by airing a match between both in Superestrellas. Shortly afterwards, Rivera re-adopted the "T.N.T." character, now under the name El hombre que ellos llaman T.N.T. (lit. "The man that they call T.N.T.") as a direct reference to WWC. By 2004, the IWA had gained an upper hand in the rivalry between both promotions, with WWC considering to sell stocks to outside investors such as Panda Energy and Jimmy Hart. However, it was Quiñones himself that ultimately lent the money so that it could continue in operation. When IWA decided to suspend its programming due to the 2004 Summer Olympics, WWC ran an old promotional video featuring Ray González encouraging them to attend its show. Parallel to this, he was involved in an angle in which he won 49% of IWA's stocks, entering into a feud with the owner of the remaining 51%, Quiñones himself.

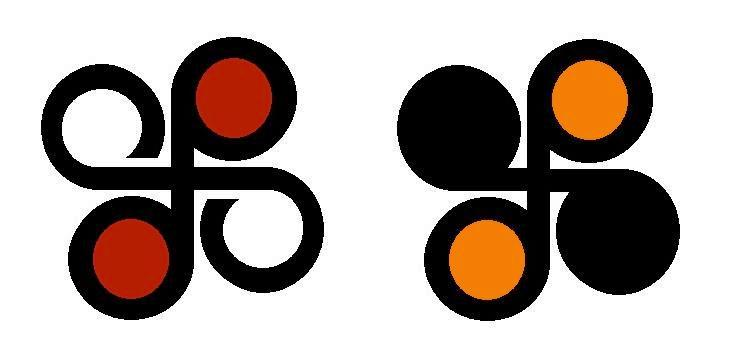
The original logo of Capitol Sports Promotions (left) and the heel version used by the International Wrestling Association's "Capitol Sports" faction (right)

In 2004, the IWA held a brief talent exchange with Ring of Honor (ROH). As part of this, the promotion held an invasion angle where several talents joined their roster, including B. J. Whitmer and Dan Maff. During this angle, the IWA bested ROH in both tag team and singles competition. In exchange, Carlos Cotto represented the IWA in a match at Glory By Honor III. On August 28, 2004, at Bad Blood, González announced that from that point onwards, IWA would be known as "Capitol Sports", claiming that Quiñones had already received documentation legally confirming this move. The move was explained by citing that he was a double agent all along and still owned 16% of WWC's shares (in reference to a storyline ran when he still wrestled there), actually working along his "business partners" (in reference to Carlos Colón Sr. and Victor Jovica) to take over the IWA. The change was expanded to the website and promotional videos to include a modified darker and duller version of Capitol's actual logo, while playing a music score associated with that promotion, Apollo 100's Joy. Capitol's influence was portrayed by González, who changed the announced cards in order to benefit their interests. The group then began recruiting Huertas-González to join them, claiming that their origin in "Capitol binds them". In September 2004, somebody assaulted Huertas-González backstage, leaving behind Juan Rivera's trademark bat. It was subsequently revealed that the culprit was Alex "Lighting" Cruz acting on González behalf to speed un the process, just when Huertas-González was about to sign a contract and join the "Capitol" faction.

On October 9, 2004, González announced that Capitol had formed an alliance with Total Nonstop Action Wrestling-NWA for Golpe de Estado and that this move would bring in NWA World Heavyweight Champion Jeff Jarrett, Robert Roode, Konnan and Shawn Hernandez to compete on its behalf. This portrayed the group as a strong foreign faction, while the IWA was mostly defended by native talent. Immediately after completing this announcement, Juan Rivera proposed that they bet the stocks in a match with the winner taking full control of both halves of the promotion, which was accepted. On October 14, 2004, at Golpe de Estado, González lost to Figueroa with the score tied between Capitol and IWA, ending the name change angle. WWC retaliated with a video emphasizing its history aired during their weekly show, Súperestrellas de la Lucha Libre. During the final months of 2004, Germán Figueroa and the IWA experienced creative disagreements and WWC pursued the opportunity to contract him. The IWA then approached Abdullah the Butcher and offered him a role in Histeria Boricua 2005, but he declined the invitation. Both Figueroa and his wife Verónica Polera were expected to appear in Euphoria 2005, with the promotion booking her as special referee and referencing him in their final promotional videos, but they made an appearance in Histeria Boricua instead. At Euphoria, WWC responded by placing Ramón Álvarez in a segment where he insulted their family and children. Afterwards, the IWA aired an out of character interview with Figueroa, who claimed that WWC advertised him, but was actually planning to have a masked Eric Pérez portraying him until his contract expired. The promotion also ran a scripted attack issued by Huertas-González, during a backstage segment. WWC launched a double offensive in Súperestrellas de la Lucha Libre, first criticizing Quiñones and then placing Pérez in a segment where he made a veiled attack towards Figueroa. The promotion also circled a press release stating their version of the events. The IWA also exploited the lack of a women's division in WWC, contracting Soldelina Vargas and introducing new talents. Their main performer was Zuleyma "Amazona" Pérez who held both the IWA World Women's Championship and the IWA Junior Heavyweight Championship. WWC also reactivated the division, with female wrestling experiencing a renaissance that led to the exposure of Nilka "Black Rose" García, Karen "Demonique" Jackson, Yahaira "Sweet Nancy" Mojica, "La Bella" Carmen Álvarez, Milagros "Genesis" Rivera and Karla "Killer Kat" Galdón among others. Despite this, the women's division was inconsistently used, with the performers switching between promotions depending in which one it was active. The result of this was that García, Mojica and Rivera held the championships of both the IWA and WWC. The relationship between both promotions remained as a calm rivalry, only interrupted with random indirect attacks from one of the parts, such as WWC placing a decorative tombstone inscribed with the phrase "RIP IWA" during a Halloween special. Later that year, the IWA ran a short angle with the Extreme Wrestling Organization, at the moment a regional independent promotion, which ended following disagreements. González's association with Jarrett soon concluded, leading to a feud between them. This angle concluded on April 3, 2005, when González defeated Jarrett in a titular contest to win the NWA World Heavyweight Championship. His reign was short, being stripped on the same event and remaining unrecognized by the NWA.

That same year, IWA recruited Roger Díaz and gave him the gimmick of "Carlitos", which mocked the Colón family by portraying an uneducated servant working for Kasey James. In April 2007, Mario Savoldi became involved with the IWA bringing two wrestlers that he represented and were originally scheduled to perform for WWC the month before. In July 2007, Carlos Cotto and Jeff Jeffrey left the IWA and appeared in a WWC show hooded. Their identities were confirmed when the IWA Intercontinental Championship was declared vacant. The IWA immediately began negotiating with them, with both making an appearance as the hooded figures seen in WWC. Despite the initial return, Jeffrey returned to WWC afterwards, while Cotto remained in the IWA leading its own hooded faction known as Los Encapuchados de la Calle (lit. "The Hooded Ones from the Streets"). In WWC, Jeffrey was joined by more IWA talent when Miguel "Biggie Size" Maldonado, a former IWA World Tag Team Champion, appeared masked in another show. The faction was later completed by two independent wrestlers and named "La Rabia", being booked in WWC's main angles along a newly arrived Figueroa. Both companies portrayed the hooded figures as invaders, with the IWA exploiting the attention that the initial jump generated creating a second faction that was purportedly linked to La Rabia, Los Encapuchados del Consejo (lit. "The Hooded ones from the Council") that served as antagonists to Los Encapuchados de la Calle. In September 2007, the IWA recovered Germán Figueroa, disrupting the storyline that WWC was running around him. The conflict between IWA and WWC was reignited after Scott Hall failed to attend a title defense of the WWC Universal Heavyweight Championship, which in turn was vacated and awarded to the number one contender, Miguel Maldonado. On December 29, 2007, the title was announced as "held up" following the events where he was declared the champion following Hall's absence to Lockout.

The commission's decision was announced during the company's holiday recess and Maldonado still retained physical possession of the championship belt. On January 6, 2008, Jack Meléndez, who had been managing "La Rabia", abandoned the company citing differences with the company's personnel. Following Meléndez's exit from the company, La Rabia abandoned the company as well, no-showing the special event scheduled for January 6, 2008. That same night, Maldonado appeared at the International Wrestling Association's Histeria Boricua event, with the championship belt still in his possession and challenged Freddie "Blitz" Lozada, the current IWA World Heavyweight Champion to a unification match. The match took place later in the event with Lozada winning both belts. Following this match WWC's merchandise manager, José Roberto Rodríguez, who had been allowed entry into the building, demanded that the belt was returned to him. However, by this time, the IWA's personnel had replaced the belt with Revolution X-Treme Wrestling's championship belt (which was in Rivera's possession) and had transferred the Universal Championship to a secure location. This led to a discussion between personnel from both companies and Rodríguez's expulsion from the event. After the event's conclusion, police officers were contacted but the IWA retained physical possession of the championship. The IWA Photoshoped the images of the plate by adding "Capitol" over the usual location of "Universal" and by modifying its silver hub to a bronze coloration, promoting the event by playing Joy in the background of their advertisement. The belt was returned to WWC personnel following an ultimatum, which claimed that the company would take legal action if it was not returned within forty-eight hours.

However, both the International Wrestling Association and the National Wrestling Alliance recognized the unification match, considering Lozada the first Undisputed World Heavyweight Champion in Puerto Rico. With the absence of the stable, WWC brought Ron Killings and booked Orlando Colón to defeat him in an attempt to re-establish the performer, who had been neglected during the La Rabia angle. However, the IWA was unable to capitalize on the impact of this angle due to Mario Savoldi abandoning the company while still in possession of part of the promotion's property. This resulted in the roster splintering in two factions, with the wrestlers that sided with Savoldi leaving for a company that was supposed to debut named "International Wrestling Entertainment". The following month, Rivera and Pérez recovered control of the IWA with Ricky Vega, one of Savoldi's main supporters, eventually making a surprising return. Ray González avoided siding with either faction, instead returning to WWC under the guise of "El Cóndor". He was immediately involved in WWC's main angle, a tournament to crown a new Universal Heavyweight Champion. On August 8, 2008, the IWA responded with another parody character, Raymond Zales, which was deliberately pronounced ray-mon-SAH-les to mimic the phonetic pronunciation of Ray González's name (ray-gon-SAH-les). On August 25, 2008, Daniel "Noriega" Torres left WWC shortly after winning the tournament to crown a new Universal Heavyweight Champion. He signed with EWO and took the new belt with him, forcing WWC to revert to the previous version. Torres eventually joined the IWA, carrying the Universal Heavyweight Championship in a black bag, claiming that it was an illegitimate title due to the unification angle, choosing to pursue the IWA Undisputed Heavyweight Championship instead of defending it.

That same year, a faction led by Juan Rivera and Miguel Pérez Jr. known "Los Autenticos" began "La Lotería del Terror", an angle in which members selected from a list of current and former employees of WWC would be attacked. As part of this angle, stable members Dennis Rivera and Noel Rodríguez visited one of WWC's events, but only stalked the outside of the venue. One of the chosen was an actual WWC wrestler, who made a single appearance in the IWA as part of this angle following a payment dispute. When this was resolved, WWC uncharacteristically gave continuation to the angle by staging a "rescue" scene. In September 2009, Torres returned to WWC, still carrying the new Universal Heavyweight Championship belt in a black bag, challenging the incumbent champion, Ángel "BJ" Rosado, to an unification of the two titles. He won and was briefly referred to as the "Undisputed Universal Heavyweight Champion". On December 12, 2009, WWC announced that Shane Sewell was leaving to sign with the "sister enterprise", spoiling a surprise appearance scheduled for the IWA's Christmas in PR. Weeks later, when WWC contracted Gilbert Cosme for Euphoria 2010, the IWA countered by filing a copyright claim to prevent the use of the "Ricky Banderas" character. WWC instead used the ring name "El Triple Mega Campeón". The inconsistent use of the women's division extended throughout the late 2000s, with the IWA even recurring to transsexual characters to keep the belt involved in the booking. In 2010, both promotions dropped their respective championships from the events. That year, IWA directly parodied José Roberto Rodríguez by giving a gimmick named "El Mostro" to David Muñiz, who adopted the former's likeness and was depicted in odd or otherwise humiliating storylines. The Extreme Wrestling Organization, by now the largest independent company in Puerto Rico and de facto third main company, entered in conflict with both the IWA, for not allowing its wrestlers participation in one of its events and WWC, for contracting the EWO World Heavyweight Champion without forcing him to drop the title.

=== El Bombazo and Tiempos de Guerra ===
In June 2010, Juan Rivera was contacted by Hugo Savinovich in order to become involved in an angle with WWC. For three years, Savinovich served as the producer of Aniversario, the WWC's main annual event. While still in negotiation, Rivera appeared in a talk show along Carlos Colón. Promotion of the angle began there by staging a spot where he criticized Carly Colón's supposed addiction to painkillers, prompting Colón to leave the stage. This marked the first time that both performed together in almost two decades, following the lawsuit filled by WWC over the "T.N.T." character. During the following weeks Rivera continued this line by issuing two challenges in IWA events, as well as changing the name of his finisher to "La Painkiller". On the final edition of WWC's Súperestrellas de la Lucha Libre show before Aniversario 2011, he interrupted the programming by stepping into the camera while wearing an IWA shirt. At the actual event, Rivera led a large group of IWA wrestlers, including incumbent Undisputed World Champion Hiram Tua, who promptly invaded the WWC ring, beating down the WWC Tag Team Champions, Wilfredo "Lynx" Rivera and Alejandro "Niche" Marrero. This event became known as "El Bombazo", referencing the "T.N.T" gimmick and the explosive nature of actual TNT. Upon gaining control over the ring, Rivera addressed the crowd and issued another challenge to Colón who responded in a subsequent interview issuing a challenge of his own. The possibility of an invasion angle had been negotiated and stalled during the course of the month.

Miguel Pérez Jr. was not involved in the negotiations, discovering about the angle when it became official. The WWC responded by entering the IWA's next event, Summer Attitude and vandalizing Quiñones' Hall of Fame induction. Despite this, the negotiations between the promotions were halted. A brief continuation took place at Septiembre Negro 2011, with Dennis Rivera and Noel Rodríguez defeating "Lynx" Rivera and "Niche" Marrero for the WWC World Tag Team Championship to unify it with the IWA World Tag Team Championship. They became the first unified tag team champions recognized by at least two of the three major promotions, but the reign was short-lived when WWC stripped them and Rivera and Rodríguez responded by legitimately taking them. Following a tour in which they defended the Unified Puerto Rico Tag Team Championship concluding in the EWO against a tag team known as "La Milicia", Rodríguez was legitimately ambushed by Alejandro "Niche" Marerro and Wilfredo "Lynx" Rivera, who took one belt of each pair. With no use to a pair of non-matching belts, the issue was resolved backstage and each promotion received their respective titles back. Prior to the WWC's Euphoria 2012 event, Rivera reappeared in Súperestrellas de la Lucha Libre, supporting Cosme (who was then allowed to use the "Ricky Banderas" character) in his contest against Colón. He eventually costed Colón the match, playing a video stating that the "hunt had begun" that lasted for the remainer the scheduled time.

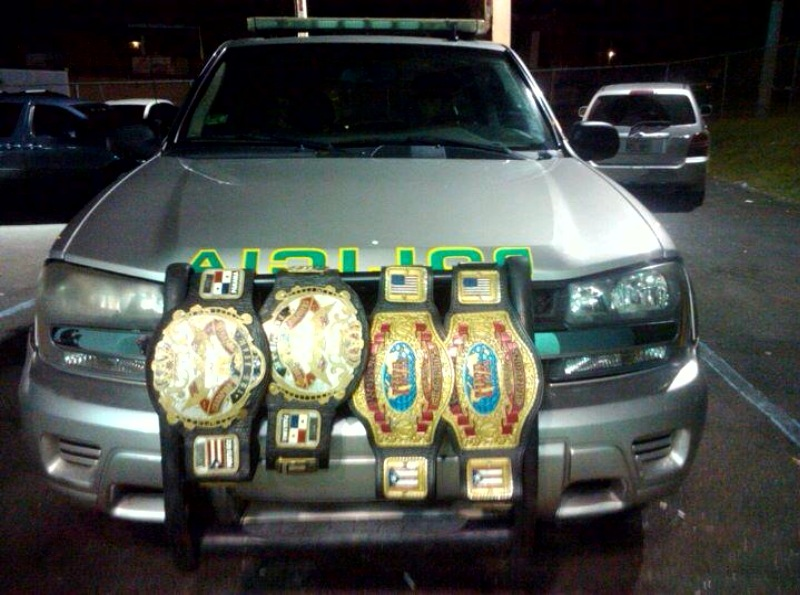
The Unified Puerto Rico Tag Team Championship as held by Dennis Rivera and Noel Rodríguez; the WWC World Tag Team Championship belts (left) and IWA World Tag Team Championship belts (right)

At Summer Attitude 2011, Chris Angel defeated Hiram Tua to become the first undefeated Undisputed World Champion, a feat in local wrestling history. On August 6, 2011, Jonathan Ayala accomplished an extremely rare feat by winning a title in his first official wrestling match, earning the IWA World Tag Team Championship along Féliz "Zaion" Torres. Angel went on to defeat all contenders, one of them being Carlos Cotto, who was subsequently fired by Pérez after questioning his involvement in a match between both. This event launched a storyline between the IWA and the Extreme Wrestling Organization, the largest independent company and de facto third main promotion in Puerto Rico. On December 17, 2011, Cotto won the EWO World Heavyweight Championship, only to be interrupted by Pérez. This was in response to a previous confrontation between both, that occurred following an unrelated charity card. After defending the title at Tierra de Nadie 2012, Pérez once again reclaimed his contract. In this event, Dennis Rivera and Noel Rodríguez participated in a scripted version of the incident at WWC, taking the EWO Tag Team Championship belts with them. At Histeria Boricua, Angel was absent for a scheduled defense due to a storyline injury, which resulted in the title being stripped from him. The interim General Manager went on to proclaim himself champion, issuing an open challenge which was accepted by EWO's first contender, a masked wrestler known only as "Bonecrusher", who won it in a squash match.

Earlier in the event, EWO wrestlers recovered their promotion's belts, while La Milicia countered by taking the IWA's, which Dennis Rivera and Noel Rodríguez actually lost to an IWA team known as "The Faces of Fear" following the distraction. The confrontations between Cotto and Pérez continued in two of IWA's events expanding to include EWO's CEO, Richard Rondón, as well. The IWA became the first to win gold officially, when Victor Ortíz teamed with Carlos Cupules to win the EWO Tag Team World Championship. In concurrent fashion, EWO employee Orlando Toledo debuted at the World Wrestling Council as a manager, cutting a promo and issuing and issuing an open challenge. On February 2, 2012, EWO uploaded a video to their YouTube account in which Toledo was hinted to be a "double agent" during a reunion with Luis Estilo, the EWO Puerto Rico Heavyweight Champion, in which he claimed that "Puerto Rico['s wrestling scene would] tremble". At la Hora de la Verdad, Toledo aided Gilbert in earning a WWC Universal Heavyweight Championship opportunity by distracting Ray González, in the process becoming the main heel manager in WWC. Following this event, EWO released another video, in which he was seen in the locker room during La Hora de la Verdad while speaking with Estilo by phone. On February 25, 2012, following more intervention from the IWA, Cotto issued a challenge to end the conflict, an unification match for the EWO World Heavyweight Championship and IWA Undisputed World Heavyweight Championship. Two days later, Toledo was once again featured in an EWO/WWC video, now talking to an unidentified person.

On March 1, 2012, the unification challenge was accepted by Pérez and Rondón in a backstage segment. At Clash of the Titans, Bonecrusher defeated Cotto, becoming the Unified World Champion. In this event, La Milicia won the IWA World Tag Team Championship from The Faces of Fear, who pursued revenge after being left belt-less despite defeating the champions. Clash of the Titans concluded when a group of masked wrestlers, known as "Ejercíto Negativo" and that was hinted to be working for Wilfredo Rivera and Alejandro Marrero, interrupted and began feuding with both promotions. Juan Rivera, who had remained uninvolved in the first events of the angle, sided with the IWA upon returning and assaulted EWO employees in the climax of Clash of the Titans. At Payback, the Ejercíto became more intrusive forcing disqualifications in several titular matches between IWA and EWO, as well as taking briefcases with contracts to challenge for the EWO Puerto Rico and IWA Caribbean titles. This event was marked with yet another confrontation between Pérez and Rondón. However, the storyline was halted due to differences between the parts, leading to a backlash that sent the IWA into a period of inactivity and weakened the EWO, which was replaced by the World Wrestling League among the major promotions. The attempt to pursue the EWO-WWC angle officially came to a conclusion in August 2012, when Richard Rondón publicly criticized WWC by claiming that it was interfering with EWO.

=== WWC vs. WWL (2012–2019) ===
The stage used by WWL is based on Castillo San Felipe del Morro.

In the final months of 2012, WWL emerged as an international promotion, forming alliances with more than a dozen organizations, including Total Nonstop Action and the National Wrestling Alliance. It also created a local partnership with WWC, booking Carly Colón for its international tour, who proceeded to defeat two established Mexican performers in Blue Demon Jr. and La Parka II as part of his in-ring debut. WWC also reinforced its roster with the absence of direct competition, including offering a full-time contract to Juan Rivera. WWL imposed its presence by importing the champions of other promotions and placing their own over them. Notable examples include the AAA World Trios Champions, Los Psycho Circus, who first lost to WWL World Heavyweight Champion José Torres, Jeff Jarrett & Matt Morgan and were afterwards defeated by Los Boricuas. WWL World Tag Team Champions Eric Pérez and Roberto Rubio defeated the AAA World Tag Team Champions, The Mexican Powers (Crazy Boy and Joe Líder), to retain their titles.

However, when WWL decided to change its business model and hold more local cards, the working relationship between both was broken. The first moves of this rivalry came shortly afterwards, when the promotion acquired wrestler Savio Vega and narrator Willie Urbina from WWC. Also reorganizing its roster to adopt most of the free agents released by IWA, the promotion held an event titled "Insurrection" and revived the La Rabia angle led by Dennis Rivera. The promotion closed the season at Navidad Corporativa, this time announcing the acquisition of Gilbert Cruz, who was actively involved in a feud for the WWC Puerto Rico Heavyweight Championship. After WWC failed to secure an appearance by "El Patrón" Alberto del Rio at Aniversario 2014, WWL capitalized by recruiting him for a new event named Guerra de Reyes held on January 5, 2015. The focus of WWL's booking on the rivalry of corporative heel stable known as "The Gentlemen's Club" and the anti-establishment faction of "La Rabia" led to several comparisons with IWA, which came to a peak when the public chanted its name during an event named International Cup 2015, where Savio Vega stated that his desire was to rename the promotion during a skit. The following day, Negrín decided to halt the continuation of the product, citing his frustration with "parasites" in an unscripted announcement. WWC exploited this to acquire John Yurnet, who had been performing as "Mr. 450" and had been involved in a feud for the WWL Americas Championship. Two weeks later, the promotion resumed operations but the roster suffered several changes, including the departure of the Rivera brothers.

WWL resumed its feud with WWC, this time by adopting the same timeslot as Superestrellas de la Lucha Libre when introducing a new program titled High Voltage on the local affiliate of Mega TV. On June 25, 2015, WWL announced the signing of Huertas González, who had been previously involved in WWC's main angle as a trainer for Ray González Jr. and who held a backstage role as booker. A response came weeks later, when the father and son tag team of Germán and Alex Figueroa left the promotion and appeared at Summer Madness 2015. Shortly afterwards, WWL introduced the rivalry between promotions to its script, acquiring Ash Rubinsky from WWC and placing him in a new stable named "El Consejo" (lit. "The Council"). The second member of this group was revealed on August 2, 2015, when David Montes made his WWL debut after months of making sporadic appearances for the former. In anticipation to Noche de Campeones 2015, Joe Bravo made his return to WWC and left the WWL Americas Championship vacant, also adopting the epithet "Gentleman" in reference to his previous involvement with The Gentlemen's Club faction. In August 2015, WWL published a segment implying that El Consejo had leader which featured an unknown wrestler impersonating Ray González and congratulating the stable for what they had done. A rebuttal came in the form of a video where González urged those involved to "abandon [that] rubbish" which was followed by the announcement that he was now the legitimate owner of a fraction of the promotion. At an event titled Sin Piedad, WWL introduced another parody group named La Verdadera Revolución, which wore the same outfit as WWC's masked trio La Revolución. A change in administration led to WWL adopting a different creative approach and dropping the confrontational booking. The promotion ran under this name until a hiatus brought forth by Hurricane Maria, afterwards, it was rebranded as La Liga.

=== Return of IWA-PR, LAWE (2019–present) ===
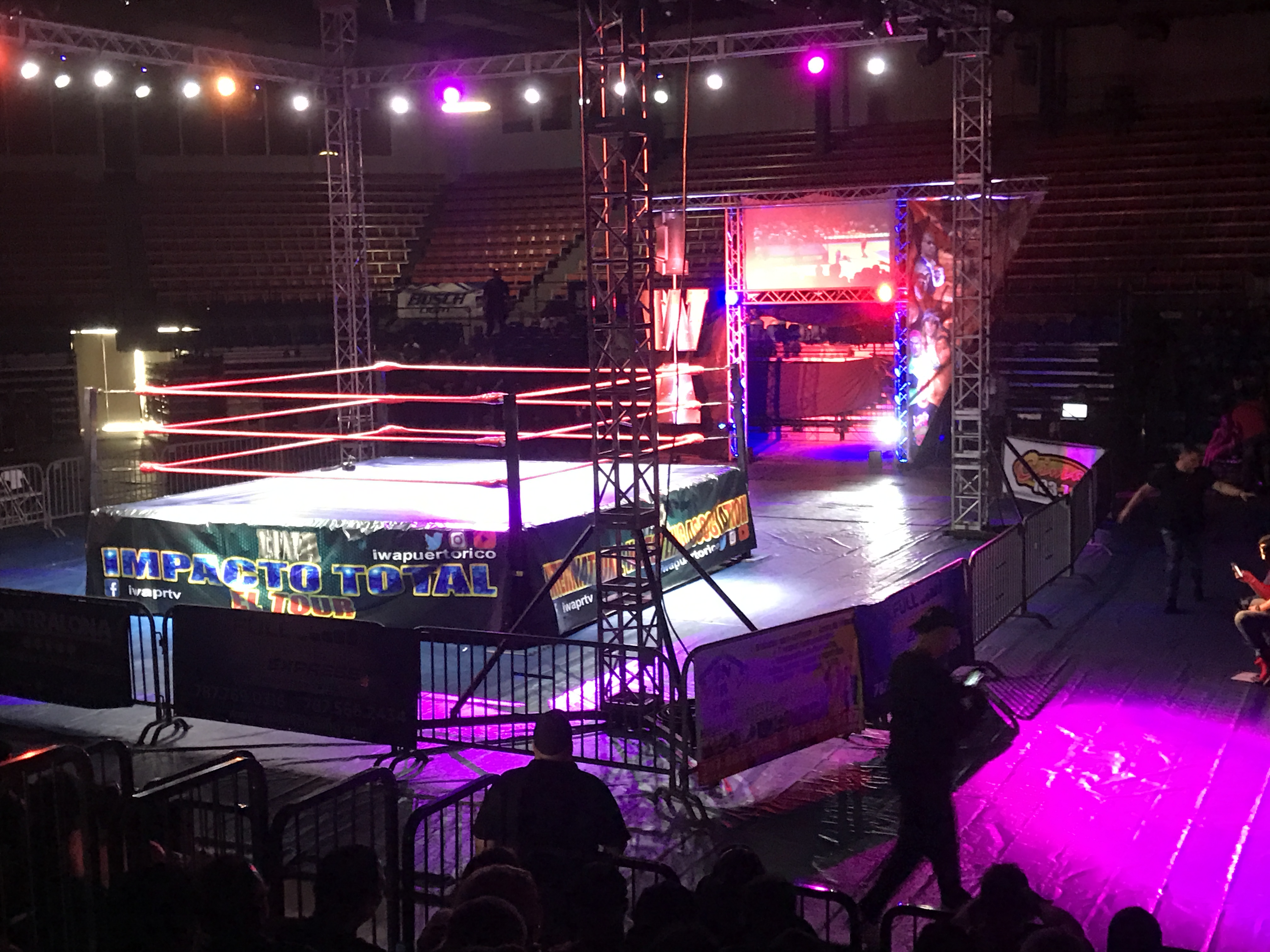
The staging used at Impacto Total: El Tour

On October 24, 2018, Savio Vega announced the return of the original incarnation of IWA-PR, with its return show taking place in 2019. After informally working together for more than a year, the promotion began an inter-promotional angle in February 2020. However, the onset of the COVID-19 plunged all promotions into a prolonged inactivity, leading to the end of the storyline and the closure of La Liga. IWA-PR returned to action in early 2021, now allied with Major League Wrestling (MLW). A smaller promotion, CWA, secured a television deal with TeleOnce and held events for its show, Acción Vibrante.

As the industry languished, Orlando and Eddie Colón began a promotion known as Latin American Wrestling Entertainment (LAWE) along Mike Chioda in March 2021. The group tried to purchase WWC, but the move ultimately failed when Victor Jovica refused to sell. Orlando Colón was the only member of the family that chose not to return to WWC when it reactivated, choosing to continue the project. LAWE held its first event in October 2021 and by February 2022 had reached a deal to air its show Adrenalina in WKAQ-TV subsidiary Punto 2, with odd appearances in the main channel.

== Independent circuit ==
During the 2000s the wrestling industry saw a notable increase of independent promotions, which has led to the establishment of more than forty different companies throughout the years. There is little cooperation between them and there is no established territorial divisions, most of the time these serve a local fan base and often close after few cards. The storyline continuity in these companies is erratic due to the lack of legal contracts, free flow of talent and reliance on guest wrestlers from the major promotions. The northern coast and metropolitan area remains the region with most of the promotions. Iman Latin Wrestling, LXW, Independent Championship Wrestling, New Generation Wrestling, Caribbean Pro Wrestling, New Wrestling Nation, SSW, PXC, NEW, National Xtreme Wrestling, Bayamón Wrestling Club, CWE, CILL, XNW, XWZ, Hottest Stars of Wrestling, Revolution Wrestling Xtreme, Puerto Rico Latin Wrestling and Extreme Borinquen Wrestling are based in northern municipalities. Companies that have organized events in the Cordillera Central include New Order Wrestling, United Association Wrestling, PWA, Champion Wrestling Association, New Pro Wrestling, Caribbean Xtreme Wrestling Alliance, WCS, Totally Xtreme Wrestling, F.L.O.W., PWO, Revolution Wrestling Association and Borinquen Sports Promotions. In the west coast, John Wrestling Promotion, New Revolution Wrestling, Xtreme Wrestling Elite and Universal Wrestling Entertainment regularly hosted events. Launched in 2005, New Wrestling Stars (NWS) held its first shows in the southwestern coast, but eventually attempted to expand to all of Puerto Rico. First by participating in the IWA's Juicio Final 2005 and subsequently by acquiring established talents including Figueroa, Shane Sewell and Bison Smith, as well as several midcard talents that had performed for both IWA and WWC.

NWS continued to expand by leasing a segment in WWC's Superestrellas de la Lucha Libre and even staged an inter-promotional angle in which Sewell unsuccessfully represented them against Carly Colón in the main event of WWC's Aniversario 2005. NWS, who had previously worked a brief alliance with IWA, also received a loan of the "T.N.T." character from WWC and convinced Adrian Cortés to perform it. The promotion closed on September 10, 2006, but part of its roster managed to establish themselves as international wrestlers, with José Torres and John Yurnet working in events for WWE and TNA. The Caribbean Wrestling Federation, World Wrestling Revolution, New Wrestling Generation, EWA, WWO, WWG, G.W.W., SCW, Puerto Rico Wrestling Alliance and PW have since continued to stage cards in this region. Despite the unstable nature of the independent circuit, some of these upstarts have managed to influence the larger companies or establish alliances with international counterparts. In the mid-2000s, Richard Filipo organized Caribbean Wrestling Entertainment, from which Chris Angel first emerged. PRWA was also a member of the American Independent Wrestling Alliance, along Arena Gladiadores of El Salvador, United Independent Wrestling Affiliates of the United States and Wrestling Anarchy Revolution in Mexico. Lucha Libre Xtrema International established a connection with Panama's Lucha Xtrema Nacional and presented co-promoted shows outside of Puerto Rico. The company continued this model after being reorganized into the International Gladiators Wrestling Alliance. The east is by far the less populated region, serving as host to the Xtreme Wrestling Alliance, New Faces of Wrestling, World Professional Wrestling and Championship Wrestling Factory. Minor promotions include the Boricua Wrestling Council, PRLW, Xtreme Wrestling Force, AIWF, CWS, WIW, Maximum Wrestling Council, AWC, NGW, U.W.C., E.W.Z. and Millennium Wrestling Entertainment.

Due to the economic challenges of competing in a highly over-saturated market with the lack of proper sponsors, several promotions have either failed to consistently hold events or have closed permanently. Throughout the last decades the examples include King Wrestling, National Wrestling Organization, Xtreme Caribbean Wrestling, C.H.W., WWS, Wrestling Organization Anti-Society, National Wrestling Federation, XWC, IWE, EWE, Wrestlevent, World Professional Wrestling, IWC, IWR, HCW, HWR, the Borinquen Wrestling Association, Breakout Ultimate World Wrestling, Nonstop Wrestling Entertainment, NWC, New Championship Wrestling, Team Wrestling Association, Total Wrestling Champion, Star Wrestling Alliance, LPW, LWE, LMW, LNR, LWR, PEW, JPW, JP Productions, DCW, All Star Wrestling and UWA. NWA Pro Caribbean and Women of Wrestling Puerto Rico began by catering to a specific demographic, but failed to gain a foothold. Other organizations like Manny Díaz's Manny's Wrestling Authority are mostly focused in hosting charity events. This expansion has continued well into the 2010s, with the foundation of Perfect Stars Wrestling and Action Wrestling Associated, both of which salvaged part of the IWA's roster. In 2013, WWC began an angle in which José Huertas-González accused independent wrestlers for the state of the business, randomly assaulting them in odd situations. This is one of the few instances in which one of the major promotions has directly referenced and acknowledged the independent circuit besides their brief alliances with the larger ones such as NPW and EWO. Both PRWA and EWO mocked the angle, responding with comedic characters "El Jibarito de Jayuya" Pepe Huertas and "El Inveider", both of which openly mocked WWC's booking and lack of a structure to develop younger talent.

== Impact and influence ==
=== Puerto Rican wrestlers abroad ===
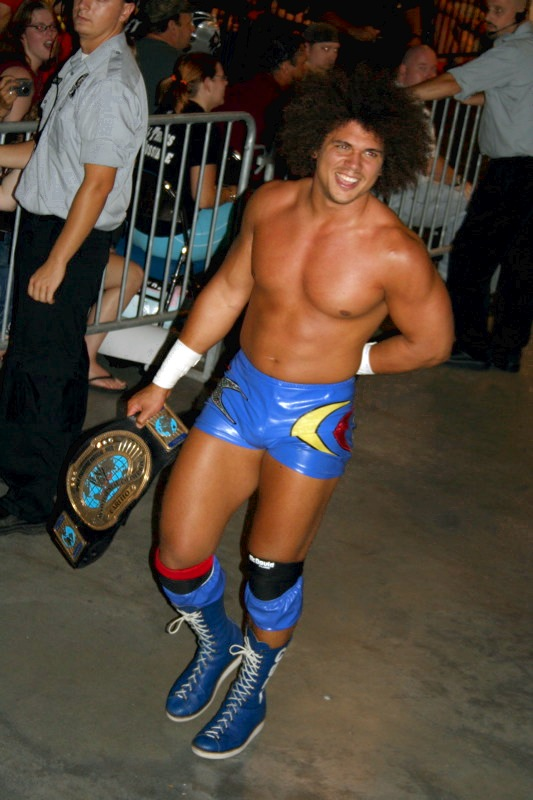
Carly "Carlito" Colón as the WWE Intercontinental Champion

After Miguel Pérez Sr. established himself as one half of the first tag team champions in what is now known as WWE by winning the NWA Capitol Tag Team Championship along Antonino Rocca, several wrestlers have followed in his footsteps. The tag team of Pérez and Rocca never lost a match in NWA Capitol/WWWF and remain the only undefeated champions in the promotion's history, also being the best-selling act in Madison Square Garden between 1957 and 1960. The most successful among Puerto Rican wrestlers performing exclusively in foreign territory was Pedro Morales, who began his career by winning heavyweight and tag team championships in promotions such as Worldwide Wrestling Associates, the American Wrestling Alliance, NWA Mid-Pacific Promotions and NWA San Francisco. Morales' biggest success came in WWE's predecessor, the World Wide Wrestling Federation, where he became the first wrestler to win the Triple Crown Championship by gathering the WWE Championship, WWE Intercontinental Championship and WWE World Tag Team Championship. During the course of his career, he wrestled several of the best performers of his time earning wins over the likes of Blue Demon, Hulk Hogan and Ric Flair. Morales was the first Latin American to win a recognized world heavyweight championship and to be inducted into the WWE Hall of Fame.

After winning the NWA Pacific Northwest Tag Team Championship along Al Madril (a tag team known as "Los Compadres") José Huertas-González also performed in WWWF, with an initial run that lasted from 1973 to 1977. As a midcard talent, he gathered wins over the likes of Pancho Valdéz, Mr. Fuji, Joe Turco, Frank Valois, Tito Torres and Lou Albano, also being involved in lasting series against Joseph "El Olympico" Corea, Johnny Rodz and Tony Altimore. After The Invaders became a four-man stable in WWC, they also performed in the United States, capturing the NWA San Francisco Pacific Coast Tag Team Championship twice. The team eventually moved to WWF, where Roberto Soto joined Huertas-González. Beginning in 1983, The Invaders entered an extended winning streak, often performing more than once per card. After this initial run, the team challenged The Wild Samoans for the WWF World Tag Team Championship, winning by disqualification. The Invaders remained recurrent challengers for the titles, defeating most of the other teams but losing to the champions. Victor Rivera also experienced success in this division. A perennial tag team performer, also winning the NWA Americas Tag Team Championship, NWA Los Angeles World Tag Team Championship, WWA Americas Heavyweight Championship and WWA World Tag Team Championship during his career, he first won the WWF International Tag Team Championship along Tony Marino and the WWF World Tag Team Championship with Dominic DeNucci five years later.

In the cruiserweight division, José Estrada Sr. also held the WWF Junior Heavyweight Championship during this timeframe. He also formed part of the lesser Los Conquistadores tag team. The other half of Los Conquistadores was José Luis Rivera, who was also part of a team known as The Shadows. Six years after Morales retired, Juan Rivera joined the promotion first known as "Kwang" and later as "Savio Vega". Despite not being booked to win a championship during his run, the creative team used him to work with wrestlers that were being pushed, which led to him being credited the first singles losses in the WWE careers of Stone Cold Steve Austin and Dwayne "The Rock" Johnson. During the late 1990s, the involvement in WWE was limited to a stable known as Los Boricuas, which participated in a storyline where it feuded against the Nation of Domination and Disciples of Apocalypse. This marked the WWF debut of Jesús Castillo Jr. and José Estrada. The team was completed by Pérez Jr., who since his WWC days had wrestled in Extreme Championship Wrestling as a challenger for the ECW World Tag Team Championship and was undefeated in World Championship Wrestling with wins over Steve Armstrong, Jesús "Ciclope" Ortíz, La Parka and Juventud Guerrera. The team feud concluded with Rivera defeating the leaders of the other two factions. Shortly afterwards, the group dissolved into two tag teams and was released.

The Colón family has established its presence in WWE. The first member was Carlos Colón Sr., who first worked for the promotion when it was known as WWWF and performed one last time at the 1993 Royal Rumble, being later recognized by his induction into the Hall of Fame. However, the most successful member has been Carly Colón, who debuted by becoming the first wrestler to win the WWE United States Championship in his official SmackDown brand debut. The following year, he became the first wrestler to win a title on two debuts within the promotion, winning the WWE Intercontinental Championship in his first appearance at the Raw brand. On August 18, 2008, Eddie Colón joined his brother in the WWE after becoming one half of the first winning the Florida Championship Wrestling Florida Tag Team Champions along Eric Pérez. The brothers were joined in a team known as The Colóns, became the first team to hold the WWE Tag Team Championship and World Tag Team Championship at the same time, making them the first Unified WWE Tag Team Champions. The following year, Eric Pérez made his SmackDown debut after spending four years in development territories, during which he also won the Deep South Wrestling Tag Team Championship and FCW Florida Heavyweight Championship. In November 2011, Orlando Colón was promoted to SmackDown after winning the Florida Tag Team Championship, eventually joining his cousin Eddie to form a team known as Primo & Epico, which went on to win the WWE Tag Team Championship. Prior to this, Carly Colón and Ray González were undefeated in the short-lived X Wrestling Federation, which had been established with the intention to directly compete with WWE. The promotion also signed José Torres and Germán Figueroa in 2007, but both were released before being making an appearance in the main brands.

In 2002, Germán Figueroa joined the National Wrestling Alliance's Total Nonstop Action Wrestling while working for the IWA. He went on to be involved in a main event feud with Jeff Jarrett and subsequently won the NWA World Tag Team Championship with D'Lo Brown. Four years later, the promotion held a show in Puerto Rico, where they announced the signing of Banderas, who appeared in a series of events between 2007 and 2008 as "Judas Mesias". Since this initial incursion into the market, TNA has established several talent exchange programs in an attempt to establish the company locally. Their first associate was the IWA, which received Samoa Joe and Booker T, both of whom went on to lose cleanly to Carlos Cotto in challenges for the IWA Undisputed World Heavyweight Championship. Afterwards, the WWL pursued a similar arrangement, in which Bobby Roode, James Storm, Christopher Daniels and Kazarian were lent for its debut show. Months later, Perfect Stars Wrestling did the same contracting Robbie E. After NWA and TNA concluded their working relationship, Germán Figueroa continued to work with them at NWA On Fire, becoming the NWA North American Champion and holding it along the NWA On Fire Heavyweight Championship. Between 2007 and 2008, the IWA was briefly affiliated to the NWA. As a result, on October 14, 2007, the promotion sanctioned a match to determine the first contenders for the NWA World Tag Team Championship, where Carlos Cotto & Freddy Lozada defeated The Naturals, Ricky Vega & Shane Sewell and Tim Arson & Big Vito. The challenge was announced to be against "The Real American Heroes" Karl Anderson and Joey Ryan and scheduled to take place in Las Vegas, however, the title opportunity was never redeemed. WWL is the first promotion to concurrently hold alliances with both TNA and NWA since both entities separated.

The independent circuit of the United States has received the addition of several Puerto Rican wrestlers seeking international attention. Gilberto "Gypsy Joe" Meléndez began his career in the independent circuit of New York, establishing a career in the independent circuit that lasted six decades and gained him accolades such as "perfecting" how to use a chair to hit an opponent. Nicknamed "The King of Death Matches", Meléndez's longevity was recognized in 2007 by WWE Magazine who proclaimed him the oldest active performer in the world, a distinction that he held for four more years until his official retirement. As a purely independent performer, most of his accomplishment came in the NWA's territories, where he won 17 different titles sanctioned under the governing body for promotions such as Heart of America Sports Attractions (Central States Wrestling), Jim Crockett Promotions, Continental Wrestling Association and Stampede Wrestling. Contemporary examples include, John Yurnett and Daniel "Noriega" Torres, who migrated from Puerto Rico and established residence in Chicago, where both have captured titles. After becoming the International Wrestling Revolution Group 2009 Rey del Ring and winning the IWRG Intercontinental Tag Team Championship in Mexico, Enrique "Ricky" Cruz joined Torres in Gladiadores Aztecas de Lucha Libre Internacional, where the team won the promotion's tag team championship. The Dagger Bros. relocated to Texas after performing for PRWA, IWA, WWC and NWS, establishing themselves as a team in the Texas Wrestling Association (TWA), NWA 360, NWA Branded Outlaw Wrestling among several other promotions. On December 15, 2012, "Los Fugitivos" Rivera and Marrero defeated the Texas Tornados to win the TWA World Tag Team Championship at EWO's X-Mas Aggression. The following year, The Dagger Bros. won these championships, this time over "The Arab Crimson Dynasty" Al Farat and Akbar Farat, also holding Texas Wrestling Entertainment's titles. Cosme won the WSX Championship in his only match for MTV's Wrestling Society X and became the Lucha Underground Champion in a similar effort by El Rey Network. There are rare instances in which a wrestler born in Puerto Rico was introduced to the business and found success before performing locally. Jonathan Figueroa, known as Amazing Red, became the youngest wrestler to win the TNA X Division Championship when he was 21 years old, a record that has stood for 21 years. Joe "Hercules" Gómez was born in the municipality of Juncos, eventually moving to Pennsylvania and establishing himself in the World Xtreme Wrestling, where his performance earned him the promotion's International and Heavyweight Championships as well as a local "Independent Wrestler of the Year" award. The Independent Wrestling Federation's Wrestling School exports its students to Puerto Rico, Japan and Canada after graduating, while they also recruit some local talents such as Antonio Rivera.

Due to the cultural and language similarities of Puerto Rico and the other Latin American countries, several local wrestlers have toured the region. Among the most successful is Cosme, who after joining Lucha Libre AAA World Wide in 2005 has performed under the characters of "Muerte Cibernética", "Asesor Cibernético", "Ricky Banderas" and "El Mesias". During his initial run, he won the IWC World Heavyweight Championship and the GPCW SUPER-X Monster Championship. Subsequently, Cosme won the tournament to crown the first AAA Mega Champion. Since then he has won it a total of four times, more than any other wrestler. Besides this, Cosme won several tournaments during this run, including the 2008 Copa Antonio Peña, the 2010 Lucha Premier and the 2013 Rey de Reyes. Despite this success he was not the first to win a championship in the highly-nationalistic Mexican circuit, Johhny "Invader III" Rivera defeated Aníbal to win the Universal Wrestling Association's World Junior Light Heavyweight Championship in 1984. Juan Rivera has also won titles in several of the region's countries. In Panama, he performed for Revolution X-treme Wrestling and won a battle royal to determine the first RXW World Heavyweight Champion. Parallel to this, Rivera wrestled in Wrestling Alliance Revolution of Ecuador, winning the WAR World Heavyweight and Tag Team Championships. Rivera also held the Dominican Wrestling Entertainment Tag Team Championship along Miguel Pérez. This particular promotion has hosted several Puerto Rican wrestlers, with Rico Casanova and Joe Bravo holding the DWE World Heavyweight Championship and DWE National Dominican Championship. Among the first to establish a career in this country was Edwin Ramos Vargas (also known as Chamaco Vargas and Puño de Hierro) from Maricao, Puerto Rico, who became one of the main performers during the 1980s, feuding with Jack Veneno, Relámpago Hernández, Astroman and most notably Hugo Savinovich (unmasking him), while also winning Dominicana de Espectáculo's Light Heavyweight and World Tag Team Championships. In 1990, the Dominican Wrestling Federation was founded and relied on talent from Puerto Rico to promote its cards, among which was Carlos Colón Sr. and Jesús Castillo. Another Puerto Rican wrestler that moved to the Dominican Republic, Carlos "Livewire" Dávila, participated in Campeones del Ring: Hacedores de Proezas, a multi-promotional event held in Bolivia on June 25, 2013, where he won the DWE World Heavyweight Championship. In 2003, Edwin "Cobra" Vázquez held an undefeated streak in the Dominican Wrestling Association. In Peru, Germán Figueroa became the first foreign wrestler to win the Leader Wrestling Association's Maximum Heavyweight Championship.

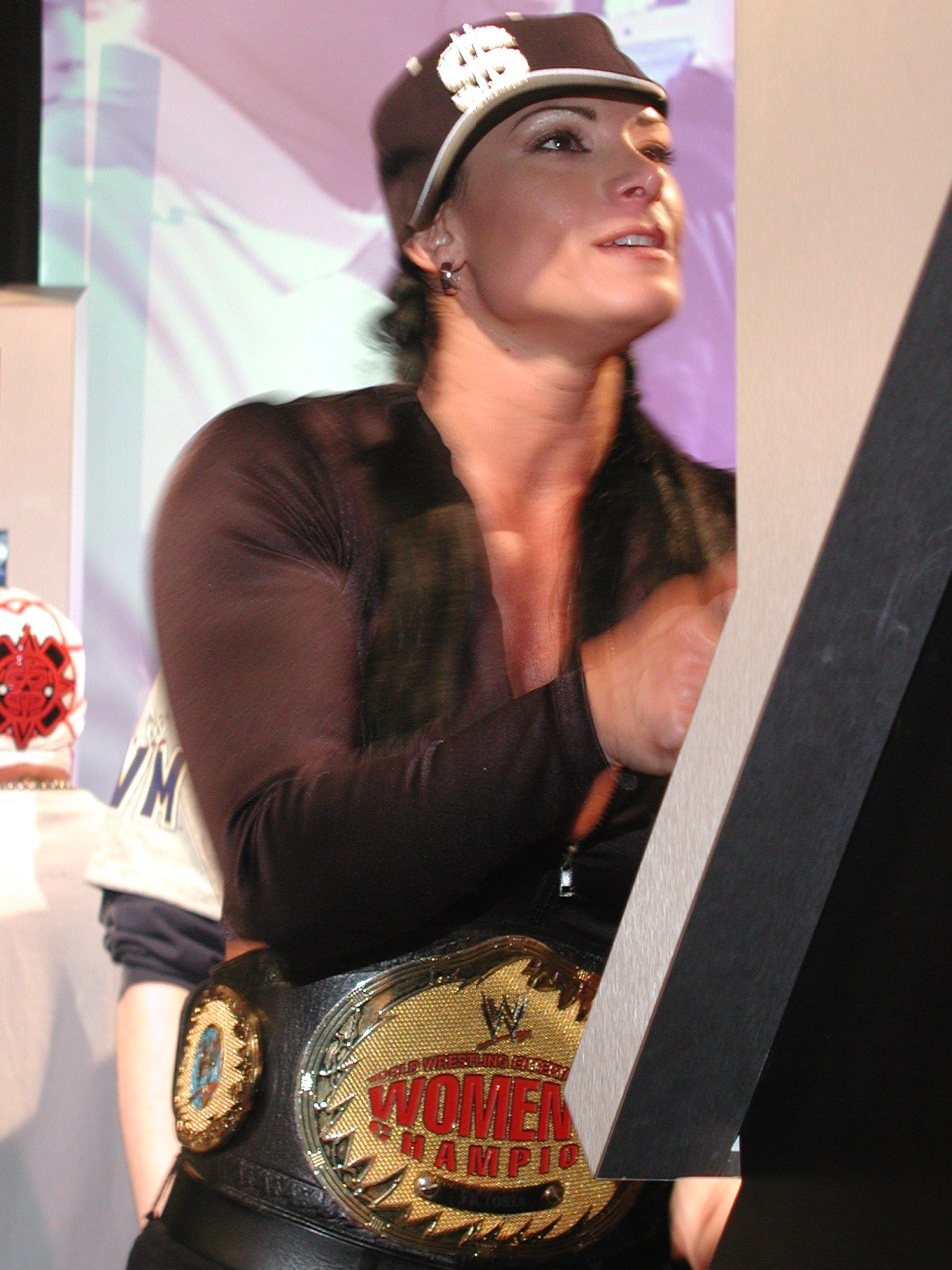
Lisa Marie Varon as the WWE Women's Champion

Besides the frequent tours to Japan, some talent has established permanent residence in Japan, which resulted in more success as Gaijin (lit. "non-Japanese") performers. When Quinones left IWA Japan following monetary disagreements, he brought some of the local talent with him in his return to FMW. Along "The Headhunters" Víctor and Manuel Santiago he created a stable known as the Puerto Rican Army which antagonized both FMW and W*ING. The group served as FMW's main heel team during its run. Backstage, Quiñones became FMW's booker and was responsible for contacting foreign wrestlers. The Puerto Rican Army dominated both FMW and W*ING, prompting an unexpected alliance between both promotions. Despite this, The Puerto Rican Army bested FMW in a match for the promotion's money. Led on screen by Quiñones, the stable would adopt foreign wrestlers into the group to reinforce its structure. José Estrada Jr. led the Puerto Rican faction in Japan while performing as "The Crypt Keeper", holding the W*ING Heavyweight Championship more times than any other wrestler and possessing the longest reign at 194 days. Parallel to this Rafael Rodríguez Moreno, known as "Jason the Terrible", won the FMW Brass Knuckles Tag Team Championship with Michael Kirchner. In tag team competition, "The Headhunters" won the FMW Six Man Street Fight Tag Team Championship and the FMW Brass Knuckles Tag Team Championship. The team went on to win the IWA Japan World Tag Team Championship. Rodríguez Moreno also accomplished this feat by winning the titles along Tim Patterson. The team's decline began when it lost the money previously won to FMW in a "yen in a pole match". Afterwards, they joined a new group called "Funk Masters", with both Quiñones and "The Headhunters" remaining a villainous faction.

Second generation wrestlers have frequently identified with their heritage, implementing the flag of Puerto Rico and several other cultural elements into their gimmicks and ring gear. Throughout the independent circuit of the United States, Nelson Erazo has held the largest number of championships among diaspora Puerto Ricans. Known as "Homicide", he is a multiple-time Ring of Honor World Heavyweight Champion and has held over twenty titles, including the NWA and TNA World Tag Team Championships along fellow second-generation performer, Shawn Hernandez, as part of the Latin American X-Change stable. This group was composed in its entirety by wrestlers with ties to the archipelago, with Konnan and Ricky Vega also tracing their lineage to Puerto Rico. The most successful second-generation female performer has been Lisa Marie Varon. Known as "Victoria" and "Tara", she has won a world championship on separate different occasions, being a two-time WWE Women's Champion and five-time TNA Knockouts Champion. AJ Lee followed the same path, first winning the FCW Divas Championship (while working under a developmental contract) and the WWE Divas Championship on June 16, 2013. Thea Trinidad also experienced some success in while working as "Rosita" in TNA, holding the TNA Knockouts Tag Team Championship once. Like Varon, Reby Sky was brought into professional wrestling after gaining notoriety in another discipline, this time modeling. Others, such as Ivelisse Vélez and Rodríguez where introduced to the business early in their lives, continuing to practice it until gaining recognition. Vélez in particular was signed to a WWE developmental contract and appeared in NXT, also participating in the WWE Tough Enough and TNA's Gut Check challenges. Afterwards, she won Pro Wrestling Revolution's Women's Championship and Shine Wrestling's Championship. Vélez was the second Puerto Rican to compete in Tough Enough, since Nidia Guenard won the first edition in 2001.

=== "Puerto Rican" as a gimmick ===
Ever since Morales proved to be a major draw with the diaspora in New York, promoters have kept the "ethnic champion" character as a mainstay. A marketing strategy that was once bluntly described by Pro Wrestling Ohio's Walter Klasinski, who stated "Are you Latino? That's a gimmick. People will love that. You can come out to Latino music. We'll drape you in a Puerto Rican flag". In the Tri-State area, wrestlers such as "The Boricua Beast" Dan Maff, "The Boricua Badass" Jorge Luis Rivera, Eddie Kingston, "The Boricua Princess" Amber Rodríguez and Astro Boricua adopted "Nuyorican" gimmicks throughout the 2000s, some of the playing a significant role in the popularization of the practice in areas such as The Bronx. From its inception Fighting Spirit Wrestling focused on selling their product to members of the diaspora, featuring performers such as "The Puerto Rican Prodigy" Ángel Ortíz and "The S.A.T." Joel and Jose Maximo, also crowning Gilbert Cruz as their first heavyweight champion. The Independent Wrestling Federation, based in New Jersey, pushed Antonio Rivera by booking him as a Junior Heavyweight and Tag Team Champion. Jamin Olivencia began his career in performing for in this area for Empire State Wrestling, where he won the tag team championship. He eventually moved to Ohio Valley Wrestling, becoming the 11th OVW Triple Crown Champion. Based in one of the states that saw an immigration of workers after Operation Bootstrap, New England Championship Wrestling also created its own set of characters in the form of "Boriqua" and "Puerto Rican Brother". In Florida, the Independent Wrestling Council has pushed the gimmick of "El Borincano", booking it for the IWC Tag Team Championship. World Xtreme Wrestling, with bases in Florida and Pennsylvania, has exploited this practice creating several gimmicks such as "Puerto Rican Chile" and "The Puerto Rican Ground Hog" (collectively known as "The Latin Hit Squad") and placing them in matches for the WXW tag team and hardcore championships in order to appeal to their Hispanic fan base. "The Latin Hit Squad" has also held the tag team championships of The National Wrestling League and NWA Liberty States under similar characters. Frequently, wrestlers with no direct relation have been billed as "Boricuas". MTV's Lucha Libre USA gave the characters of "San Juan Kid" and "PR Flyer" to Damon Kendrick and Louis Lyndon, naming the team "PR Powers".

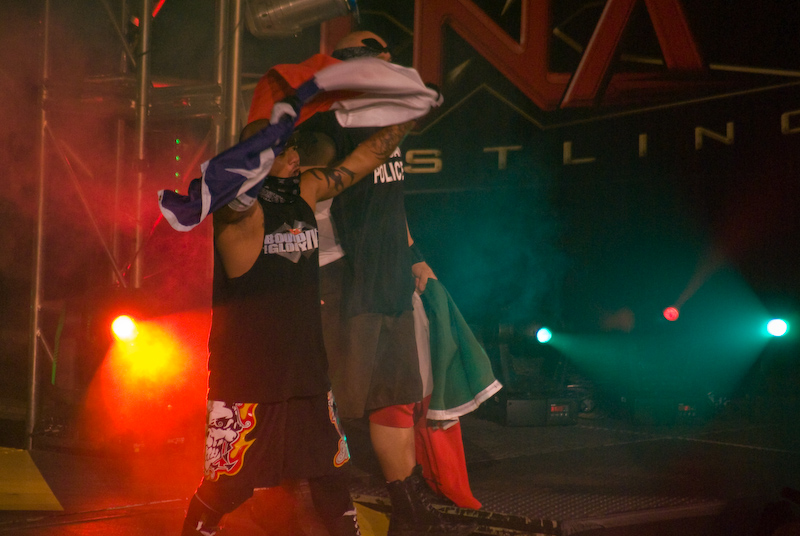
Erazo hoisting the flag of Puerto Rico

This foreign heel character has become increasingly popular in Mexico, where it is influenced by the notorious Puerto Rico-Mexico boxing rivalry, which has produced dozens of high-profile matches for boxing world championships. However, despite the involvement of several Puerto Ricans in Mexican lucha libre, the gimmick has been usually handed to wrestlers of other nationalities. Among these are the Legión de Puerto Rico, which featured Cuban-born David Sierra, who received a heavy push performing as the masked "El Boricua" and his tag team partner, Miami-based Ricky Santana. The "El Boricua" character was so popular as a rudo, that it was adopted in 2000 by Víctor Manuel Góngora Cisneros, who was entering the final stages of his career and sought a fresher character in order to compensate for his declining physical performance. This move proved successful, granting him a final run as a main event heel before losing the mask. However, the luchador that was responsible for openly adopting the "nationality shift" trend was Norberto Salgado, known as Pierroth Jr. or Comandante Pierroth. Who after wrestling for WWC and performing in a feud with González which resulted in losing his mask a second time, returned to Mexico. In CMLL he entered into a feud with the Legión de Puerto Rico, leading the CMLL tecnicos against them and unmasking Sierra. In 2000, he entered a period of inactivity that lasted two years due to health concerns. In 2002, Salgado emerged from this forced retirement and unexpectedly adopted the gimmick of a self-proclaimed Puerto Rican known as Pierroth de Puerto Rico. The stable was named El Comando Caribeño and was commonly referred to as "Los Boricuas", despite being formed by Panamian Veneno, Canadian Al Barone and Mexicans El Gran Markus Jr. (Candido Robles Cruz), Violencia (Bias Columba), Killer (Luis Vera Rodríguez) among others. Dominican Rafael Herbert Reyes was introduced to the team as Salgado's supposed son, "Hijo del Pierroth". The only Puerto Rican member that the group had during its run was Julio Estrada, who had previously worked with Salgado in Puerto Rico and defended the WWC Caribbean Heavyweight Championship over Blue Demon Jr. and Poder Mechita. El Comando Caribeño soon established its presence as CMLL's main villainous stable.

While representing Puerto Rico, Salgado experienced a surge in popularity as a rudo which was reflected in his luchas de apuestas record, defeating Máscara Año Dos Mil, Cien Caras, Apolo Dantés and Brazo de Plata during this run. He also expelled Violencia and Gran Markus Jr. winning luchas de apuestas over them as well. In 2013, original member of the stable, Arthur "Poder Boricua" Muñoz, was repackaged as the new "Comandante Pierroth". This was followed by the introduction of a group known as El Nuevo Comando Caribeño. Like the first version of the stable, it featured wrestlers that claimed to be Puerto Rican despite being mostly formed by Mexican wrestlers, with masked luchadora Zeuxis being its only member born in Puerto Rico. After Salgado decided to stop supporting other "Pierroths", Reyes dropped the Hijo del Pierroth gimmick while retaining his character, now as "Pierko el Boricua" and winning his first mask afterwards. Despite losing the mask in 2009, Reyes readopted the character the following year while wrestling for MTV's Masked Warriors. In the United States the role of the "rudo Puerto Rican" has also become widespread in cities with large Mexican populations. The trend has also been scarcely used in locations with large Puerto Rican populations, such as Orlando's Pro Wrestling Fit USA. However, Californian promotion Revolution Pro Wrestling deviated from this formula, imbuing the fan favorite character of "Mr. Excitement" to a Puerto Rican and even booking him for the PWR Mexican Lucha Libre Heavyweight Championship. He was billed as a "giant killer" and continued to have success in NWA California, where he won the Patriot Cup. Likewise, Ecuadorian wrestler Pablo Márquez adopted the ring name of El Puerto Riqueño or El Puerto Ricano while performing as a fan favorite in ECW. There he challenged for the ECW Television Championship on several occasions under this gimmick, but was not able to win the belt. The Puerto Rico vs. Mexico rivalry has even been employed by promotions in neutral states, such as North Connecticut's Power Pro Wrestling.

=== Sports and politics ===
Due to its popularity, professional wrestling has made occasional crossovers with other aspects of Puerto Rican culture. During the 1980s, when it rivaled legitimate sports such as boxing, basketball and baseball, it competed with them for some of the large venues. Capitol Sports took advantage of this in 1984, when Colón wrestled former heavyweight boxing world champion Joe Frazier in a match that served as a scripted predecessor to modern mixed martial arts. The event was worked with a round format and featured Frazier scoring two knockdowns in the first before Colón won by pinning him in the fifth. Frazier also served as the referee of a series of matches where Colón wrestled Goodish and Ayala. In 1990, Héctor Camacho worked as a manager in Capitol Sports Promotions. After years without the involvement of a boxer in WWC, Félix "Tito" Trinidad was named the referee in a match between Ray González and Orlando Colón at Aniversario 2009. Carlos Cotto, a member of the prominent Cotto boxing family, made his professional boxing debut in 2013 after concluding his amateur career with a record of 1–0 (1 knockout). On February 23, 2013, Cotto became the first wrestler to fight in a boxing match and then perform in a wrestling event during the same night. Cotto repeated this feat months later and even referenced it by defeating Samsom Walker in a scripted "boxing gloves" match for the WWC Puerto Rico Heavyweight Championship.

Politics as an aspect that involves a large amount of publicity, has also gathered the attention of professional wrestlers. In consecutive elections, Juan Rivera has run as a write-in candidate for the Governorship of Puerto Rico for the unregistered and tongue-in-cheek Partido Luchador Puertorriqueño. On the other hand, Dennis Rivera is a member of the Puerto Rican Nationalist Party, who has served as an activist for free university education. In 2010, Laureano announced that he intended to run as senator at-large for the New Progressive Party. He obtained the approval of the party's leadership and even promoted his candidature in WWC cards. However, after several months he discontinued this campaign. He subsequently stated that he did so after witnessing how the party worked, criticizing that it benefited the higher classes and noted that he had changed his political affiliation to the Popular Democratic Party in 2012. Laureano later actively supported that party's candidate for the mayor of the municipality of Bayamón, Darlene Reyes. Another wrestler that became involved in political campaign was Huertas-González, who supported the PNP's candidate, Jorge Santini, in his unsuccessful bid to retain the San Juan mayorship against Carmen Yulín. Wrestling had been used before as a form of entertainment during political campaigns, with the performance of the Jose and Julio Estrada as "Mr. PPD" and "Mr.PNP" in 1988.

=== Economic impact ===
Professional wrestling is considered the highest source of income in the sports entertainment industry in Puerto Rico; a minor industry within the island's tertiary sector in its overall economy. Historically, the assistance rate of the events has been irregular, reaching high and low-points thought the last four decades. During the peak of CSP's monopoly of the business, the promotion experienced a degree of unparalleled success. In 1984, the company established the assistance record for a single event, performing before a crowd of 34,383 at Hiram Bithorn Stadium. The epitome of this success came at Aniversario 1986, where CSP held events in three different venues at once and sold 43,000 tickets. For the remainder of the decade, the promotion continued to sell-out several venues, with all Aniversario events selling at least 11,000 tickets. The first collapse took place in the 1990s, following the Goodish incident and which was exacerbated due to the creative line of the product becoming stale. Despite this, the promotions made adjustments that led to a steady recovery to close the decade. Between 1999 and 2001, the IWA experienced losses of $1,500,000 in initial investments, while contracting around 60 full-time and 40 indirect or partial employees. During the IWA's peak of popularity, professional wrestling was second in assistance among all sports and competitive performance. Selling over 500,000 tickets (with the IWA gathering sales of 443,250 in 2003) it was only surpassed by the Baloncesto Superior Nacional, the main basketball league in Puerto Rico, which sold 1,300,000 tickets. This also placed it above AA baseball (400,000), women's volleyball (326,480) and Major League Baseball Montreal Expos series (312,862). The growth during this timeframe was estimated at 30% and was expected to reach an average of 600,000 fans. The price of the tickets steadily remained at $10.00 for adults and $5.00 for children for regular shows with higher prices for special events, these rates were more expensive that the sport leagues that it competed against. Along these figures, a notable increase in the assistance of followers belonging to the middle-high and high classes. This success also extended to the Internet, where the main local professional wrestling sites received thousands of daily hits. However, the second half of this decade experienced a sharp decline in assistance. By the beginning of the 2010s professional wrestling events saw a series of years where events were mostly empty, with regular shows rarely selling 1,000 tickets and most cards rounding the low hundreds.

=== Derivative products ===
Professional wrestling has been a common target for comedic parody in Puerto Rican television. Sunshine Logroño was the first to introduce a character based on the practice, introducing Vitin Alicea. The character was portrayed as a gym owner, trainer, wrestling manager and Colón's "biggest fan". The segment was heavily used to promote WWC's events, with some of the heel wrestlers assaulting him for comedic purpose. However, it also featured some of Alicea's students, fictional professional wrestlers King Cabra and Culebro Mendoza. Among the performers that visited the segment were Ray González, Dutch Mantell, Victor Rodríguez, Carlos Colón Sr. and Carly Colón, while he also became involved in actual wrestling cards. In the 2000s, comedian Miguel Morales hosted a segment covering fictional promotion, the Estudio69 Wrestling Federation (WW69) as part of his program. The show featured a character named Ito Rolón, named after Colón and Trinidad, who was portrayed as the perennial EWF Intergalactic Champion and who promoted his faux action figure line. He would make appearances preceded by cheers from the public and his theme song, "Ahí viene Ito Rolón", always opening his promos by saluting his three aunts or "mamas": Ada, Dora and Ita. The comedy in these segments involved wrestlers using chairs and other objects made out of foam to attack each others, and then appearing to convulse while covering their faces with ketchup. Most of Rolón's matches were against La Piedra and most skits were hosted in random public locations, rarely taking place inside an actual ring. This was self-parodied with odd gimmick contests, including a “24-hour Puerto Rico-wide Hard Core Match”, which was filmed in San Juan, Cayey, Ponce and Caguas. Backstage segments featured Lugo, a parody of Savinovich, and an unnamed Commissioner. During course of the show, they ran a series of angle-like sketches, including a Rolón heel turn where he was revealed to be Laureano's illegitimate child and a storyline where he was betrayed by all of his allies and abandoned Puerto Rico for a secluded island, remaining there and growing a beard until being convinced to return by Lugo. The roster would also feature his tag team partner Tite el Plomero, La Bestia, El Doctor Muerte, El Hijo de Hercules and Lugo himself as a "mysterious masked wrestler". Morales himself teamed with Juan Rivera while portraying Rolón in a match that actually featured real maneuvers, defeating "Los Intocables" Miguel Pérez Jr. and Jesús Castillo Jr. (accompanied by Kevin "Pain" Landry) despite being legitimately injured. A women's division was composed by two teams, the TeDan and Melones sisters. The character of Ito Rolón made a one night return a decade later, now as the champion of the Univision Wrestling Federation (UWF) introducing several characters including Chicho Libre, Rasta Man and manager El Barracuda.

In 2002, television producer Kobbo Santarrosa made a crossover by wrestling Carlos Colón Sr. in his in-ring debut. A controversial figure as the host of the defunct SuperXclusivo, Santarosa performed as a heel and lost the match by stoppage due to blood loss. Besides television, the practice has influenced other aspects of popular culture, with the notable example being the popularization of the phrase Bregando Chicky Starr (lit. "Dealing like Chicky Starr") when referring to illegal or otherwise immoral acts. In the early 2000s, the University of Puerto Rico held a series of academic congresses that discussed the practice of professional wrestling an its impact in society, which included the participation of Laureano himself. A less common form of influence involves a wrestler creating an unsanctioned championship and borrowing the name of a local promotion to bestow some credibility upon it. Pierroth was responsible for the creation of two fictional WWC titles. The first was the "WWC Intercontinental Championship", which he brought to Puerto Rico and later went on to become the IWRG Championship after being unified in a match against Pirata Morgan in Mexico. The second was a "WWC Hard Core Championship" that preceded the actual WWC Hardcore Championship and was carried by him in the CMLL as a symbol of the Comando Caribeño's purported Puerto Rican link. David Sierra mimicked this action, bringing in his version of the "WWC Cuba Heavyweight Championship". In the IWA, a stable known as La Conexion Arabe did the same, introducing a version of the "IWA Arab Heavyweight Championship" decorated with the flag of the United Arab Emirates when one of its members won the IWA Puerto Rico Heavyweight Championship. More than a decade later, a short-lived fraudulent "IWA" title also appeared outside the promotion. A similar concept was also created by religious ministry Luchando Contra Las Tinieblas, which is mostly composed by former professional wrestlers and referees, with a belt inscribed with "Jesucristo" (Jesus Christ) and adorned with server crosses being featured in sermons. In this same line, churches have actually hosted wrestling events, such as CristoManía.

== See also ==
- List of professional wrestling attendance records in Puerto Rico
- Rickin Sánchez – Puerto Rican professional wrestling sportscaster
