= Tomás Marín =

Puerto Rican professional wrestler and referee (1934–2018)

Personal information
- Born: Tomás Marín Rodriguez; July 7, 1934 Juncos, Puerto Rico
- Died: November 23, 2018 (aged 84) Hato Rey, Puerto Rico

Professional wrestling career
- Ring name(s): Eugenio Marin; Tomás Marín; El Martillo
- Billed weight: 229 lb (104 kg)
- Billed from: Puerto Rico
- Trained by: Murcielago Velazquez; Medico Asesino
- Debut: 1958
- Retired: 1976

Tomás Marín Rodríguez (July 7, 1934 – November 23, 2018), better known by the ring name Tomás Marín, was a former Puerto Rican professional wrestler in the World Wide Wrestling Federation and mostly known as a referee for the World Wrestling Council.

== Professional wrestling career ==
Tomás Marín was born in Juncos, Puerto Rico on July 7, 1934, and grew up in Santurce. Immigrating to the United States in the late 1950s, Marín trained to be a professional wrestler in New York City and made his pro debut in 1958. He started his career with NWA Capitol Wrestling mostly as enhancement talent. He also worked for the Arizona Athletic Association, a territory based in Tucson, Arizona. In 1975 worked at the International Wrestling Association in New Jersey.

In 1976 Marín returned to Puerto Rico as a regular wrestler for the World Wrestling Council where worked as a heel. He also wrestled in the Dominican Republic and Venezuela. Due to the fact that he generated massive heat and created riots, the WWC office decided to give him a job as referee. He also worked as a referee for the American Wrestling Federation in Puerto Rico. He stayed working as referee at independent shows until 2002.

After his retirement, Marín opened a gym in Santurce and continued training professional wrestlers.

== Death ==
Tomás Marín died on November 23, 2018, at Auxilio Mutuo Hospital in Hato Rey, Puerto Rico after a battle with colorectal cancer.
