= Dogs in warfare =

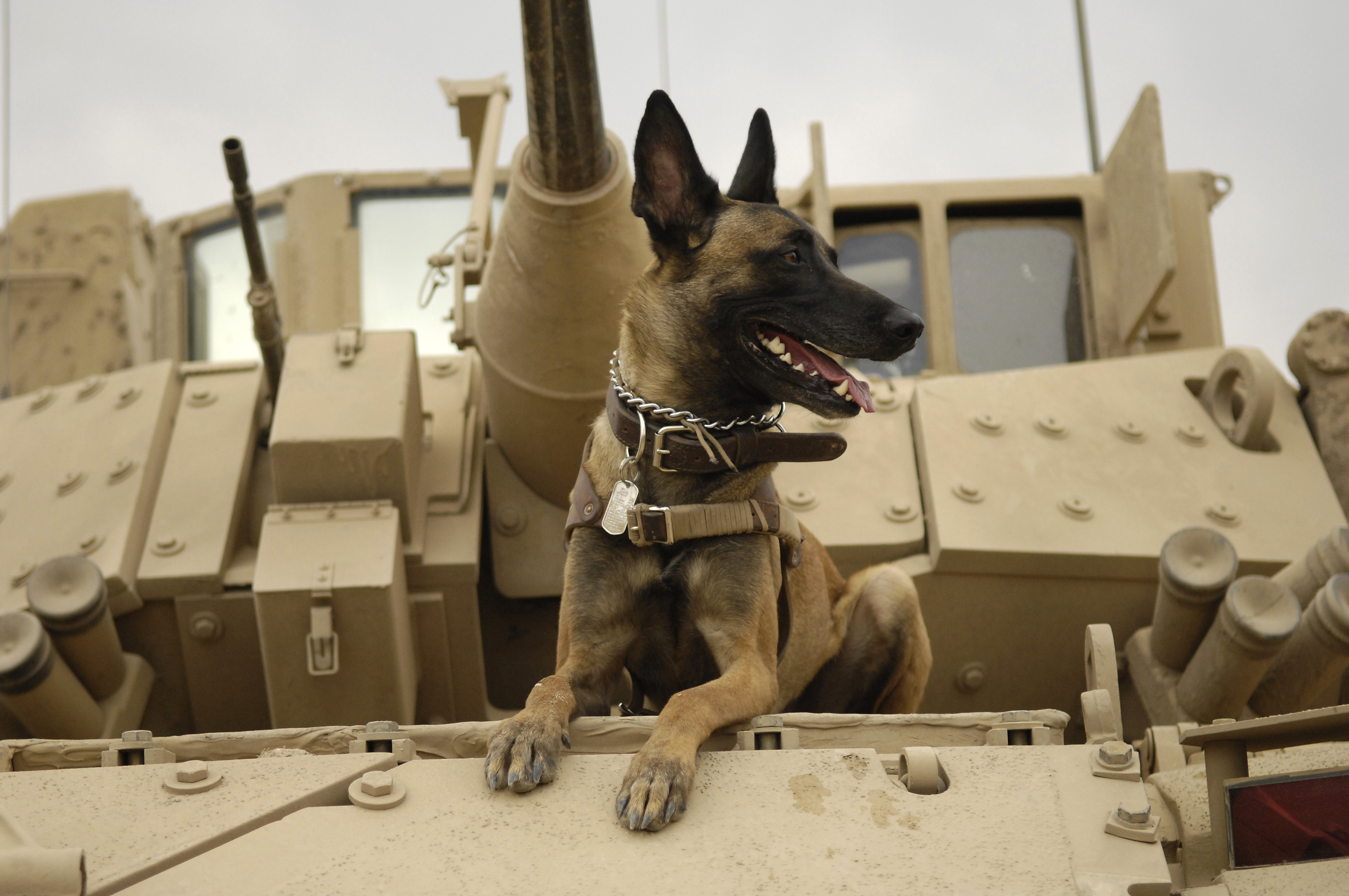
A Belgian Malinois ("Jackson"), in service with the United States Air Force, sitting on an M2A3 Bradley fighting vehicle before heading out on a mission in Khan Bani Saad during the Iraq War, 13 February 2007

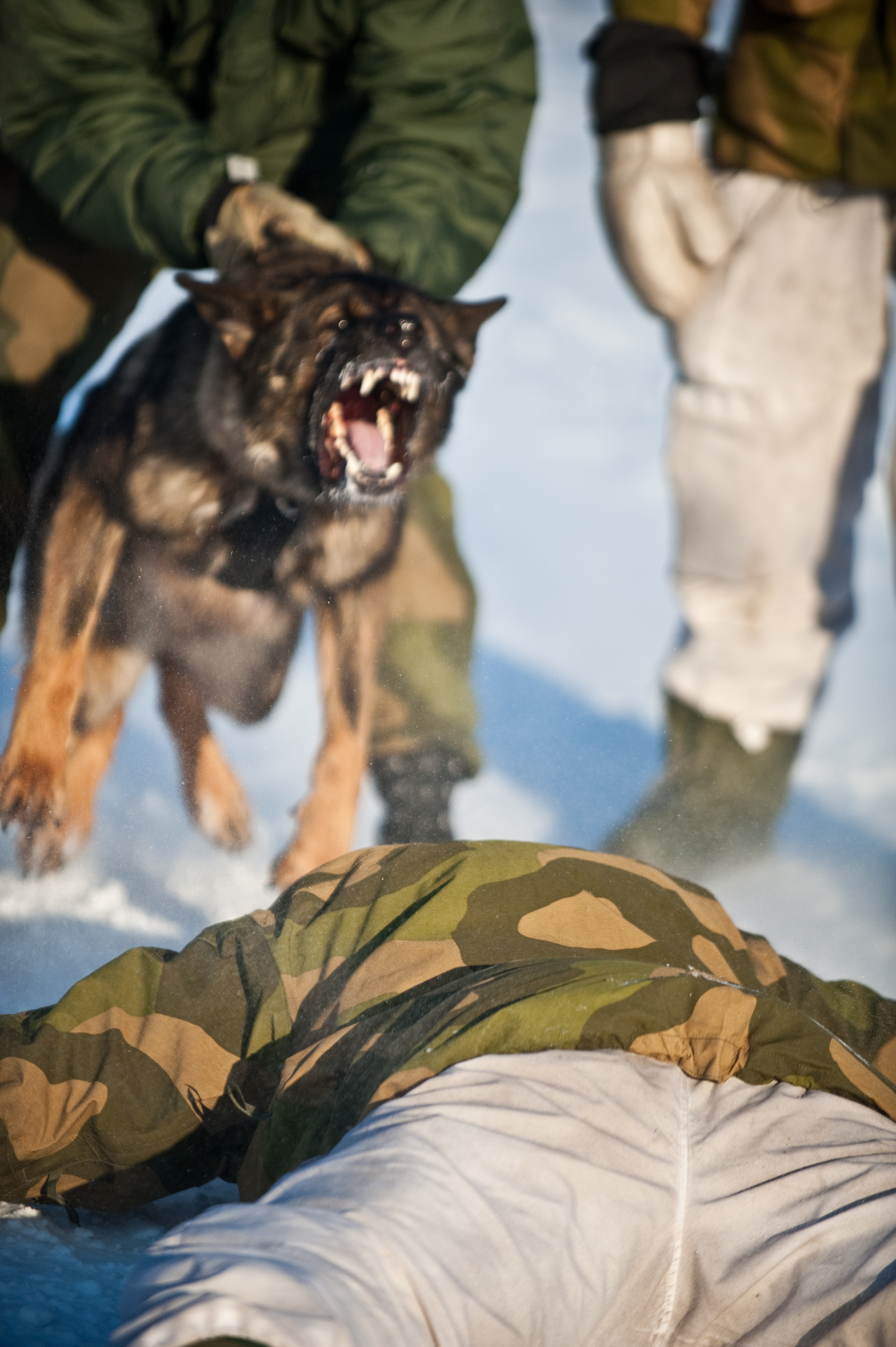
Attack dog serving with the Garrison of Sør-Varanger of the Norwegian Army during a simulated arrest, 9 March 2008

Dogs have a very long history in warfare, beginning in ancient times. From being trained in combat, to their use as scouts, sentries, messengers, mercy dogs, and trackers, their uses have been varied, and some continue to exist in modern military usage.

== History ==
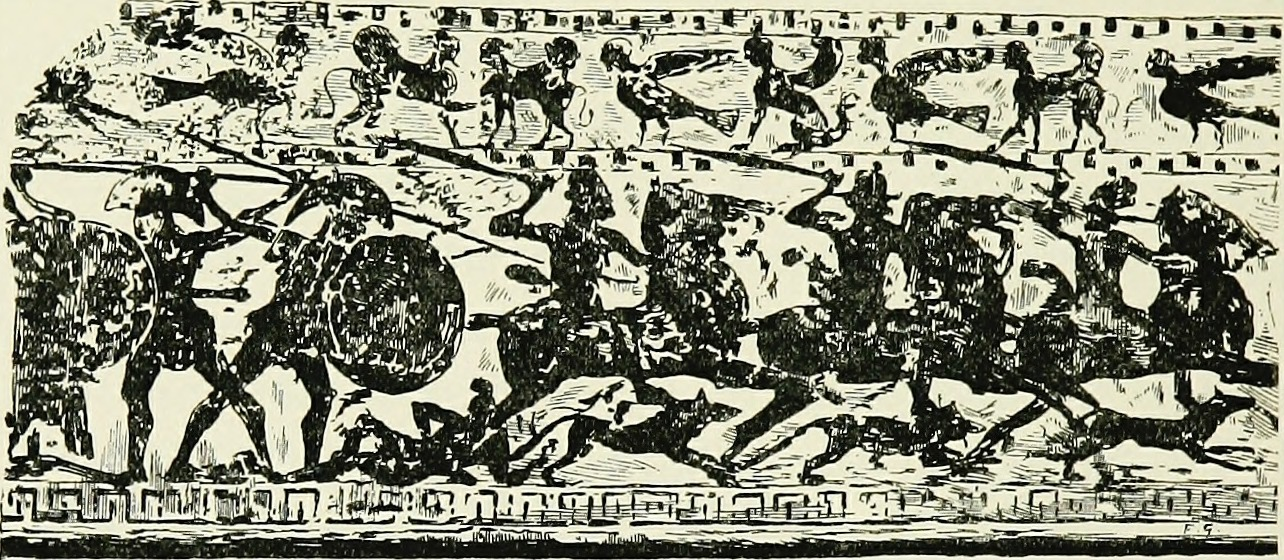
A battle between the Cimmerians and the Greeks, as depicted on a Pontic plate: Cimmerian cavalry and their war dogs fighting against Greek hoplites

War dogs were used by the Egyptians, Greeks, Persians, Sarmatians, Baganda, Alans, Slavs, Britons, and Romans.

Among the Greeks and Romans, dogs served most often as sentries or patrols, though they were sometimes taken into battle. The earliest use of war dogs in a battle recorded in classical sources was by Alyattes of Lydia against the Cimmerians around 600 BC. The Lydian dogs killed some invaders and routed others. At the Battle of Pelusium (525 BC), Cambyses II deployed dogs, cats, and other animals held sacred by the Egyptians. By putting these animals on the front lines, he was supposedly able to get the Egyptians to cease using their projectile weaponry.

During the Late Antiquity, Attila the Hun used large war dogs in his campaigns. Gifts of war dog breeding stock between European royalty were seen as suitable tokens for exchange throughout the Middle Ages. Other civilizations used armoured dogs to defend caravans or attack enemies.

In the Far East, 15th-century Vietnamese Emperor Lê Lợi raised a pack of over 100 hounds, tended and trained by Nguyễn Xí, whose skills were impressive enough to promote him to the commander of a shock troop regiment.

Later on, Frederick the Great of Prussia used dogs as messengers during the Seven Years' War with Russia. Napoleon also used dogs during his campaigns. Dogs were used until 1770 to guard naval installations in France.

The first official use of dogs for military purposes in the U.S. was during the Seminole Wars. Hounds were used in the American Civil War to protect, send messages, and guard prisoners. General Grant recounted how Southern bloodhounds were sometimes destroyed by Union troops due to their training to hunt runaway slaves. Dogs were also used as mascots in American WWI propaganda and recruiting posters.

== Timeline ==
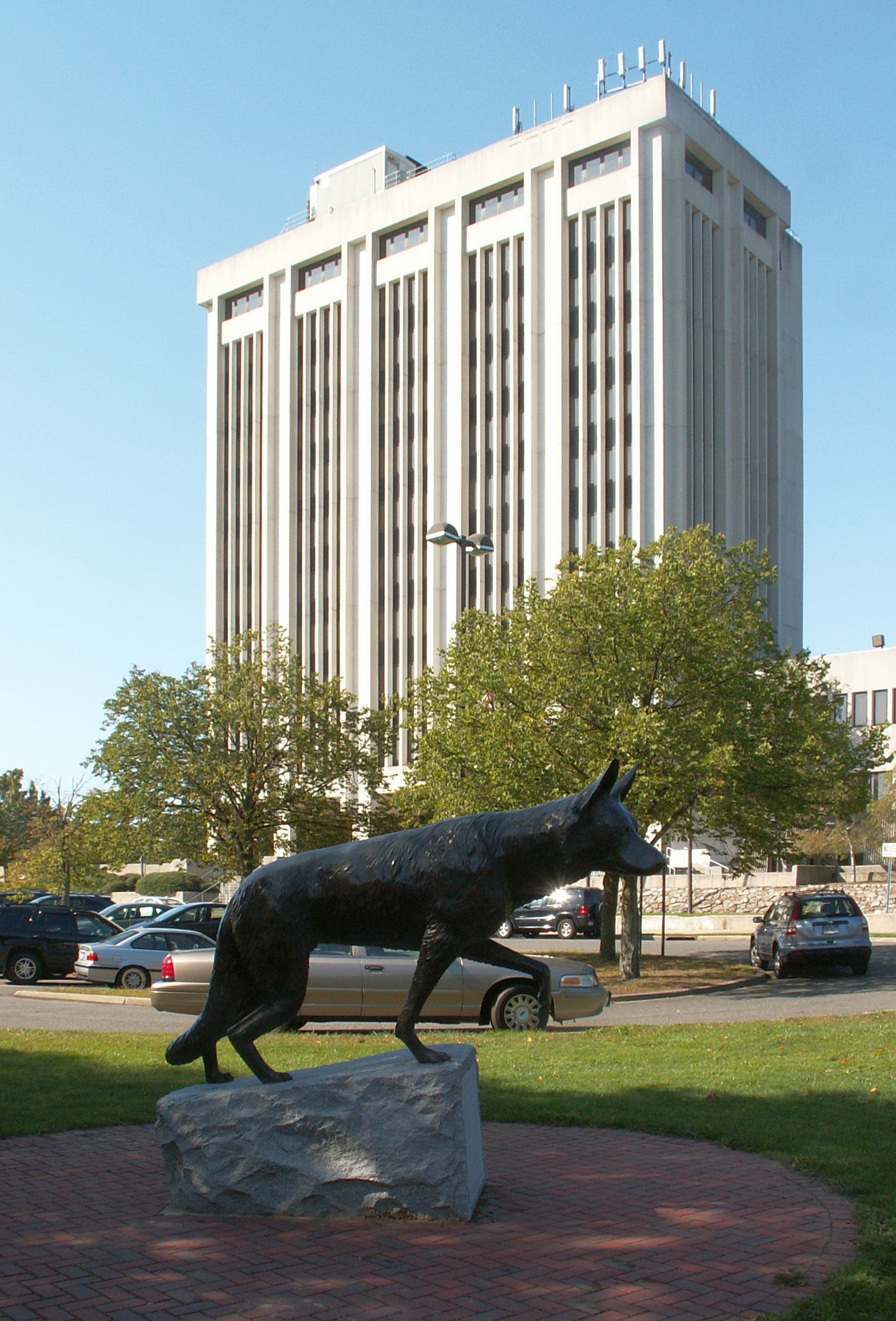
Monument to war dogs in front of the Suffolk County Executive Building in Hauppauge, New York

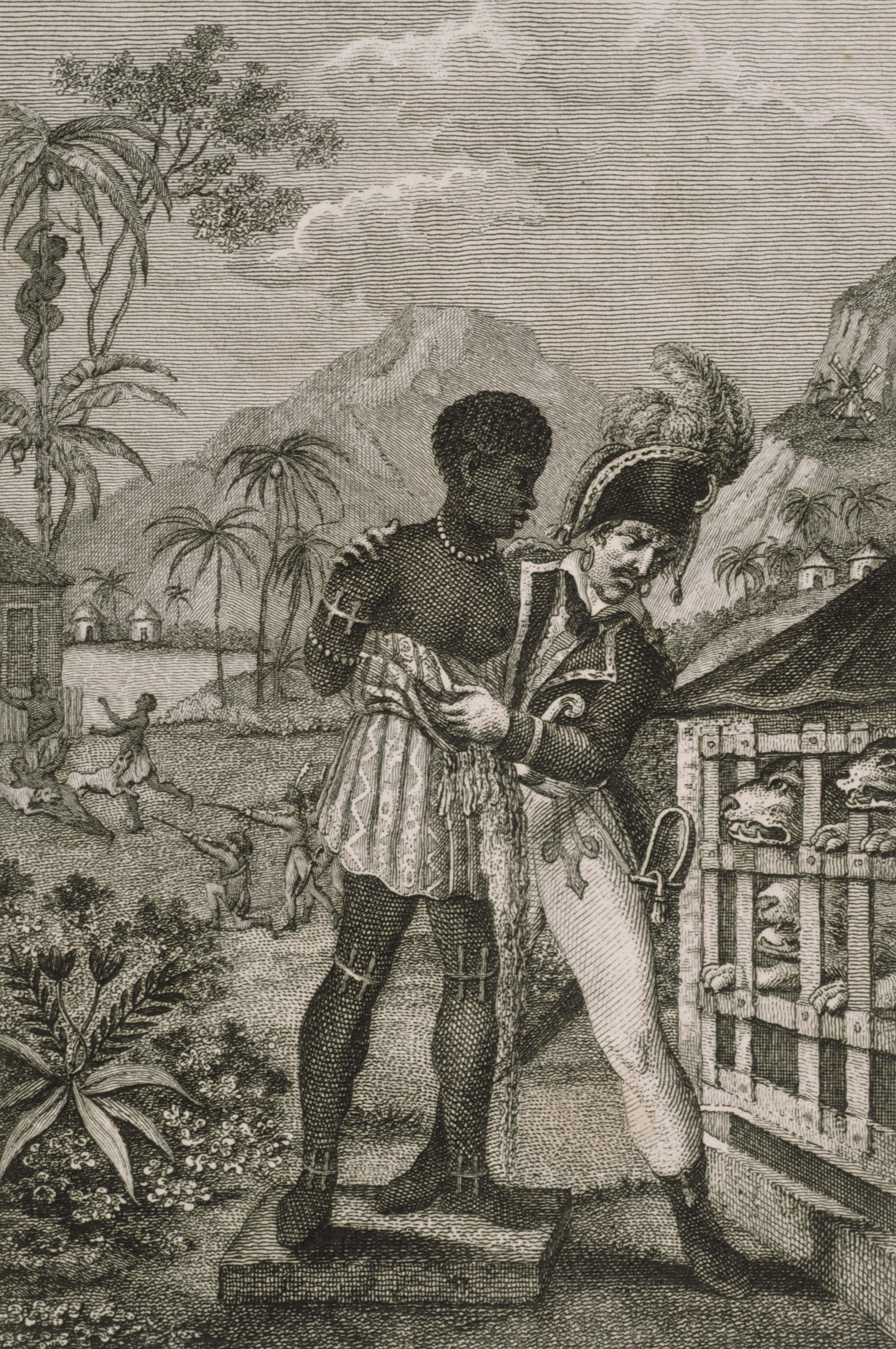
A French officer feeding a Black woman to a Dogo Cubano during the Saint-Domingue expedition

Dogs have been used in warfare by many civilizations. As warfare has progressed, their purposes have changed greatly.

- Mid-seventh century BC: In the war waged by the Ephesians against Magnesia on the Maeander, their horsemen were each accompanied by a war dog and a spear-bearing attendant. Dogs were released first and broke the enemy ranks, followed by an assault of spears, then a cavalry charge. An epitaph records the burial of a Magnesian horseman named Hippaemon with his dog Lethargos, his horse, and his spearman.
- 525 BC: At the Battle of Pelusium, Cambyses II used a psychological tactic against the Egyptians, arraying dogs and other animals in the front line to effectively take advantage of the Egyptian religious reverence for animals.
- 490 BC: At the Battle of Marathon, a dog followed his hoplite master into battle against the Persians and was memorialized in a mural.
- 480 BC: Xerxes I of Persia was accompanied by vast packs of Indian hounds when he invaded Greece. They may have served in the military and were possibly being used for sport or hunting, but their purpose is unrecorded.
- 281 BC: Lysimachus was slain during the Battle of Corupedium and his body was discovered preserved on the battlefield and guarded vigilantly by his faithful dog.
- 231 BC: Roman consul Marcus Pomponius Matho led the Roman legions through the inland of Sardinia. The inhabitants engaged in guerrilla warfare, against the invaders. The Romans used "dogs from Italy" to hunt down the natives who tried to hide in the caves.
- 1500s: Mastiffs and other large breeds were used extensively by Spanish conquistadors against Native Americans.
- 1700–1800s: Dogs were used by European colonial powers and the United States to suppress slave rebellions in the Americas.
- 1902 Dogs of war were used by the Argentine Republic in Patagonia "for the colonization of the bottom of the country, a raid was made against these poor harmless children of nature, and many tribes were wiped out of existence. The Argentines let loose the dogs of war against them; many were killed and the rest—men, women and children—were deported by sea".
- 1914–1918: Dogs were used by international forces to deliver vital messages. Sergeant Stubby, a Bull Terrier or Boston Terrier, has been called the most decorated war dog of World War I, and the only dog to be nominated for rank and then promoted to sergeant through combat. Recognized in connection with an exhibition at the Smithsonian Institution. Among many other exploits, he's said to have captured a German spy. He also became mascot at Georgetown University. Rags was another notable World War I dog. The article explains that in WWI, dogs helped soldiers by carrying messages, standing guard, and finding the wounded. Because they were so helpful, the US later created an official program to train military dogs. This program started in 1942. The article also mentions memorials made to honor the dogs that served.
- 1941–1945: The Soviet Union deployed dogs strapped with explosives against invading German tanks, with limited success.
- 1943–1945: The United States Marine Corps used dogs, donated by their American owners, in the Pacific theatre to help take islands back from Japanese occupying forces. During this period, the Doberman Pinscher became the official dog of the USMC; however, all breeds of dogs were eligible to train to be "war dogs of the Pacific". Of the 549 dogs that returned from the war, only four could not be returned to civilian life. Many of the dogs went home with their handlers from the war. Chips was the most decorated war dog during World War II.
- 1966–1972: About 5,000 US war dogs served in the Vietnam War (the US Army did not retain records prior to 1968); about 10,000 US servicemen served as dog handlers during the war, and the K9 units are estimated to have saved over 10,000 human lives; 232 military working dogs and 295 US servicemen working as dog handlers were killed in action during the war. An estimated 200 Vietnam War dogs survived the war to be assigned to other US bases outside the US. The remaining canines were euthanized or left behind.
- 2011: United States Navy SEALs used a Belgian Malinois military working dog named Cairo in Operation Neptune Spear, in which Osama bin Laden was killed.
- 2019: United States 1st SFOD-D operators used a male Belgian Malinois named Conan during the Barisha raid.
- 2020: According to Democratic senator Richard Blumenthal, US military working dogs should be bred in the US rather than in Europe. American breeders are said to become a necessity in the near term, Blumenthal said, solely due to an increase in demand for the dogs.

== Roles ==
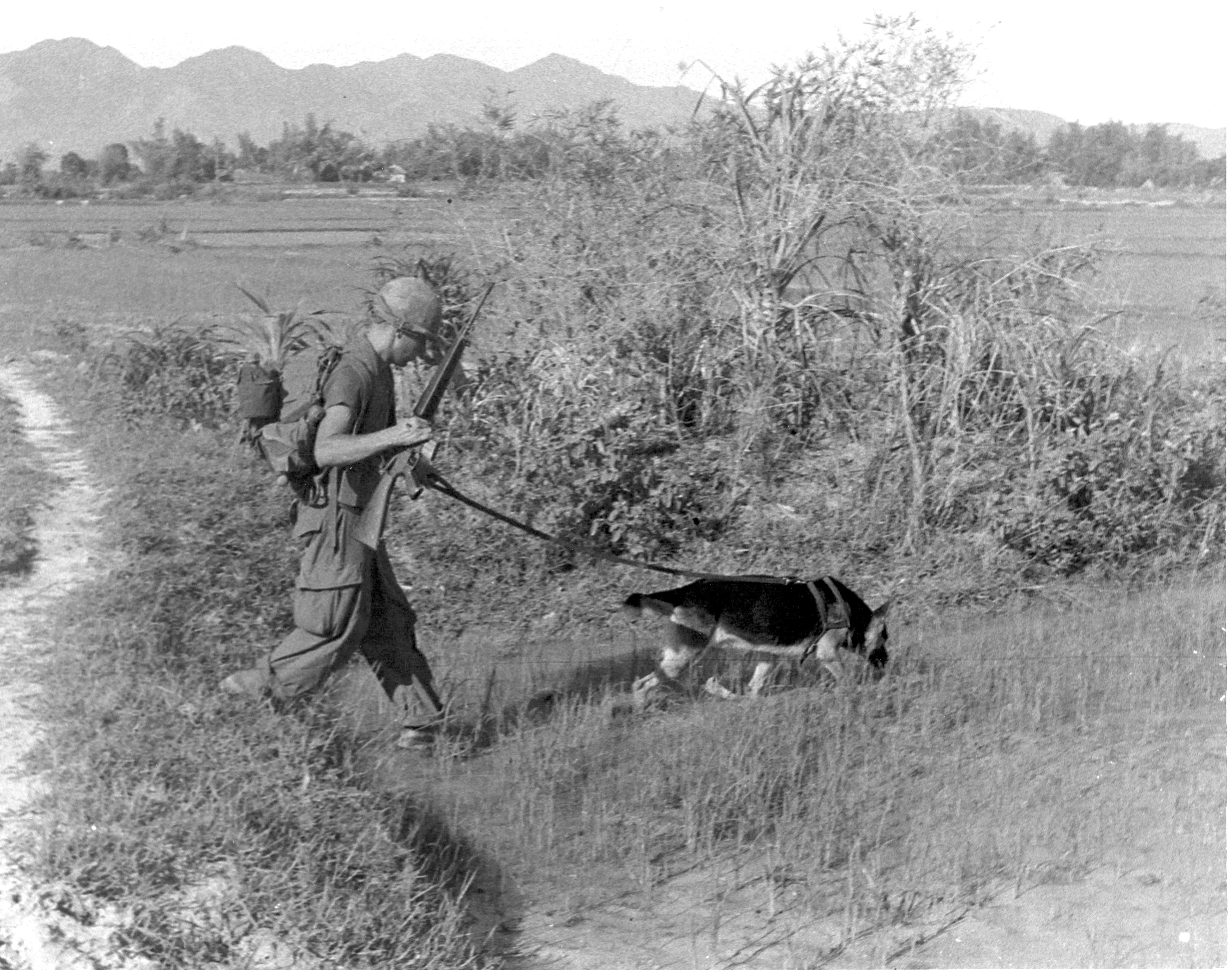
A German Shepherd ("Chief"), in service with the United States Army, patrolling with his handler SP4 Bealock during the Vietnam War, 1960s

Dogs have been used for many different purposes. Different breeds were used for different tasks, but always met the demands of the handlers. Many roles for dogs in war are obsolete and no longer practiced, but the concept of the war dog still remains alive and well in modern warfare.

=== Fighting ===
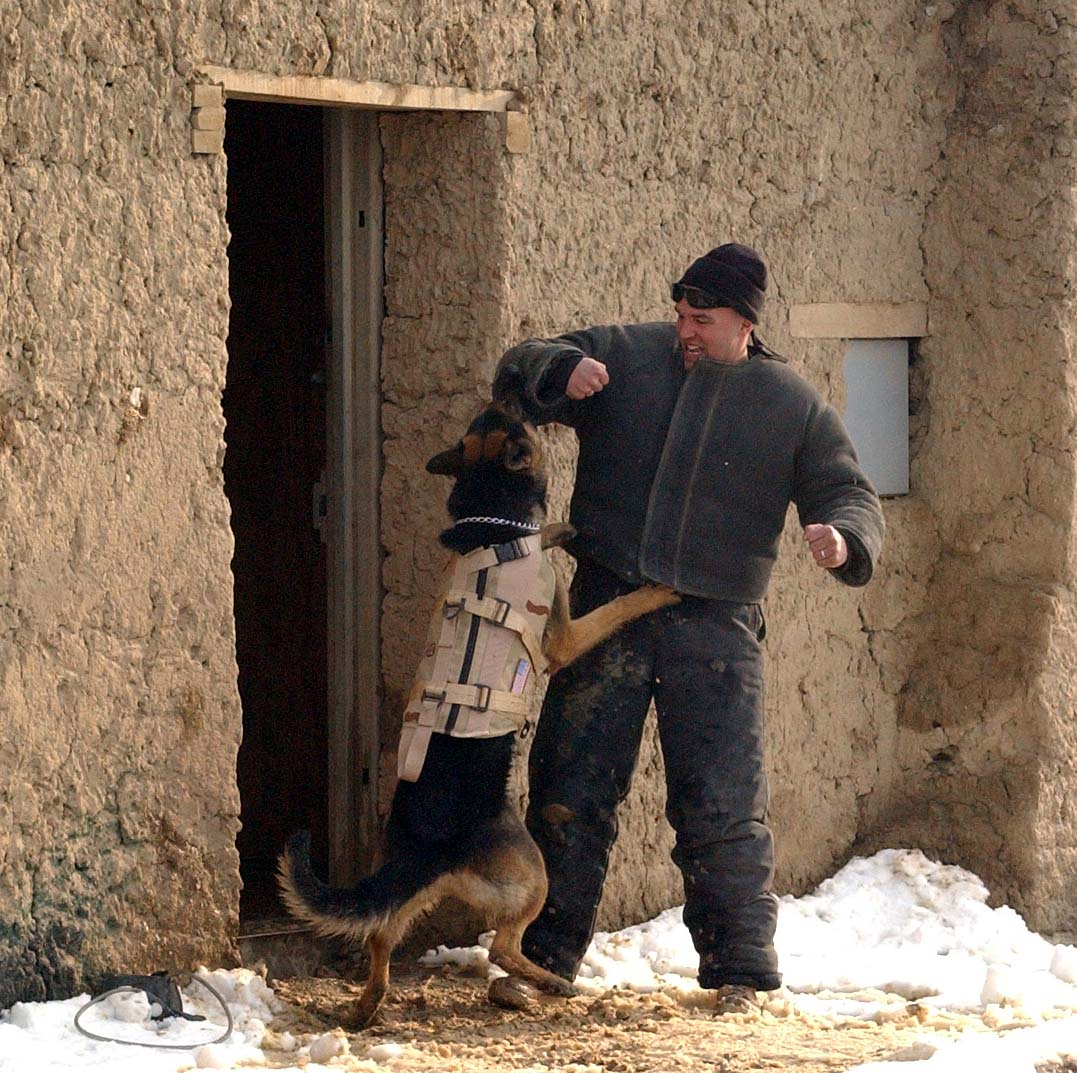
An attack dog, in service with the United States military, undergoing escalation-of-force training during the War in Afghanistan, 25 February 2005

In ancient times, dogs, often large mastiff-type breeds, would be strapped with armour or spiked collars and sent into battle to attack the enemy. This strategy was used by various civilizations, such as the Romans and the Greeks. While not as common as in previous centuries, modern militaries continue to employ dogs in an attack role. Special Operations forces of the US military still use dogs in raids for apprehending fleeing enemies or prisoners, or for searching areas too difficult or dangerous for human soldiers (such as crawl spaces).

Another program attempted during World War II was suggested by a Swiss citizen living in Santa Fe, New Mexico. William A. Prestre proposed using large dogs to kill Japanese soldiers. He persuaded the military to lease an entire island in the Mississippi to house the training facilities. There, the army hoped to train as many as two million dogs. The idea was to begin island invasions with landing craft releasing thousands of dogs against the Japanese defenders, then followed up by troops as the Japanese defenders scattered in confusion. One of the biggest problems encountered was getting Japanese soldiers with whom to train the dogs, because few Japanese soldiers were being captured. Eventually, Japanese-American soldiers volunteered for the training. Another large problem was with the dogs; either they were too docile, did not properly respond to their beach-crossing training, or were terrified by shellfire. After millions of dollars were spent with inconclusive results, the program was abandoned.

The Soviet Union used dogs for antitank purposes beginning in the 1930s. Earlier antitank dogs were fitted with tilt-rod mines and trained to run beneath enemy tanks, which would detonate the mines automatically. However, the dogs were trained with stationary Russian tanks and very seldom ran under the moving tanks; instead, they were shot as they ran beside the moving tanks. When both Russian and German tanks were present, the dogs would preferentially run towards the familiar Russian tanks.

=== Logistics and communication ===
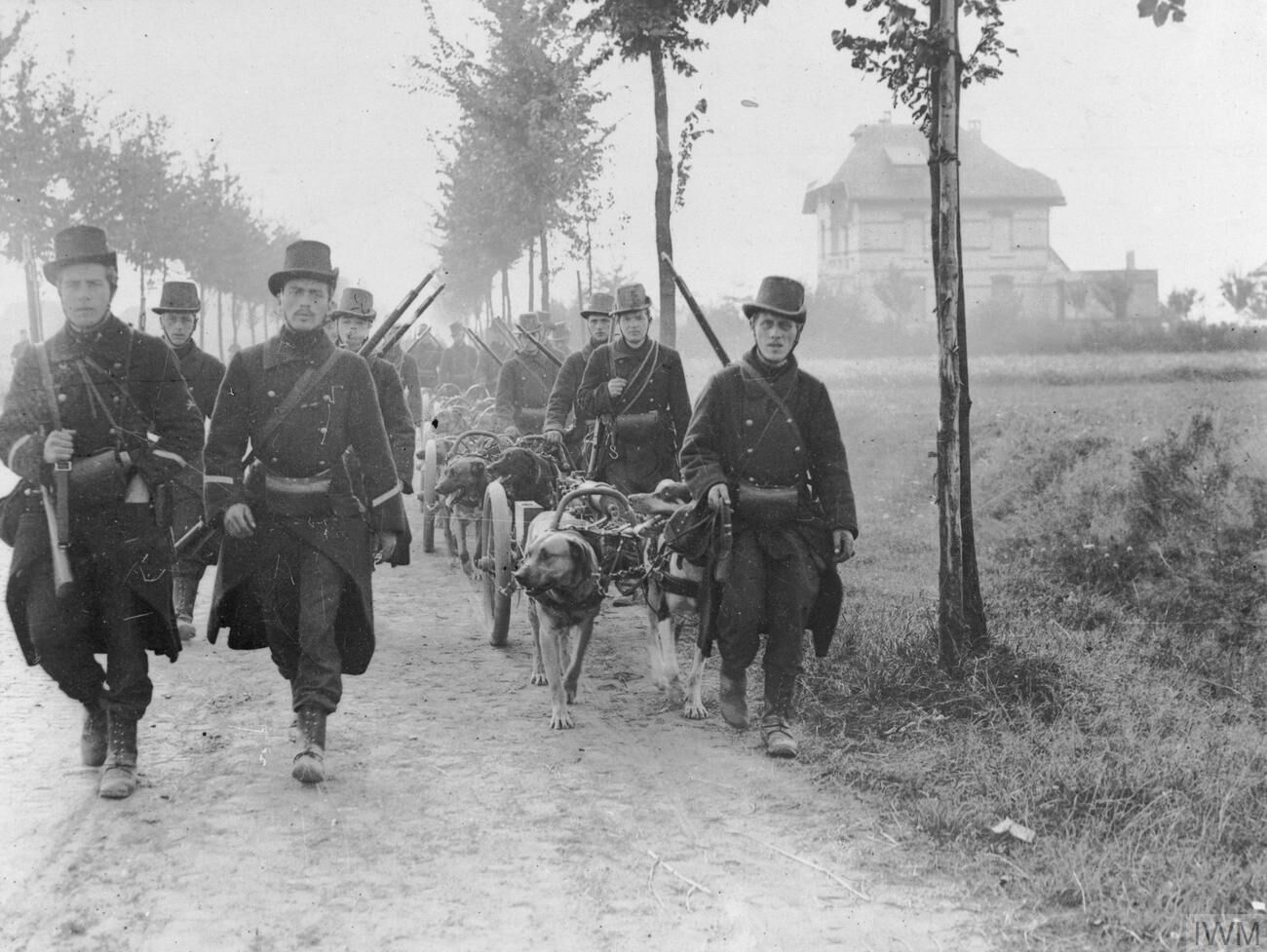
Carabiniers of the Belgian Army walking with dog-drawn machine gun carts in the Battle of the Frontiers during World War I, 20 August 1914

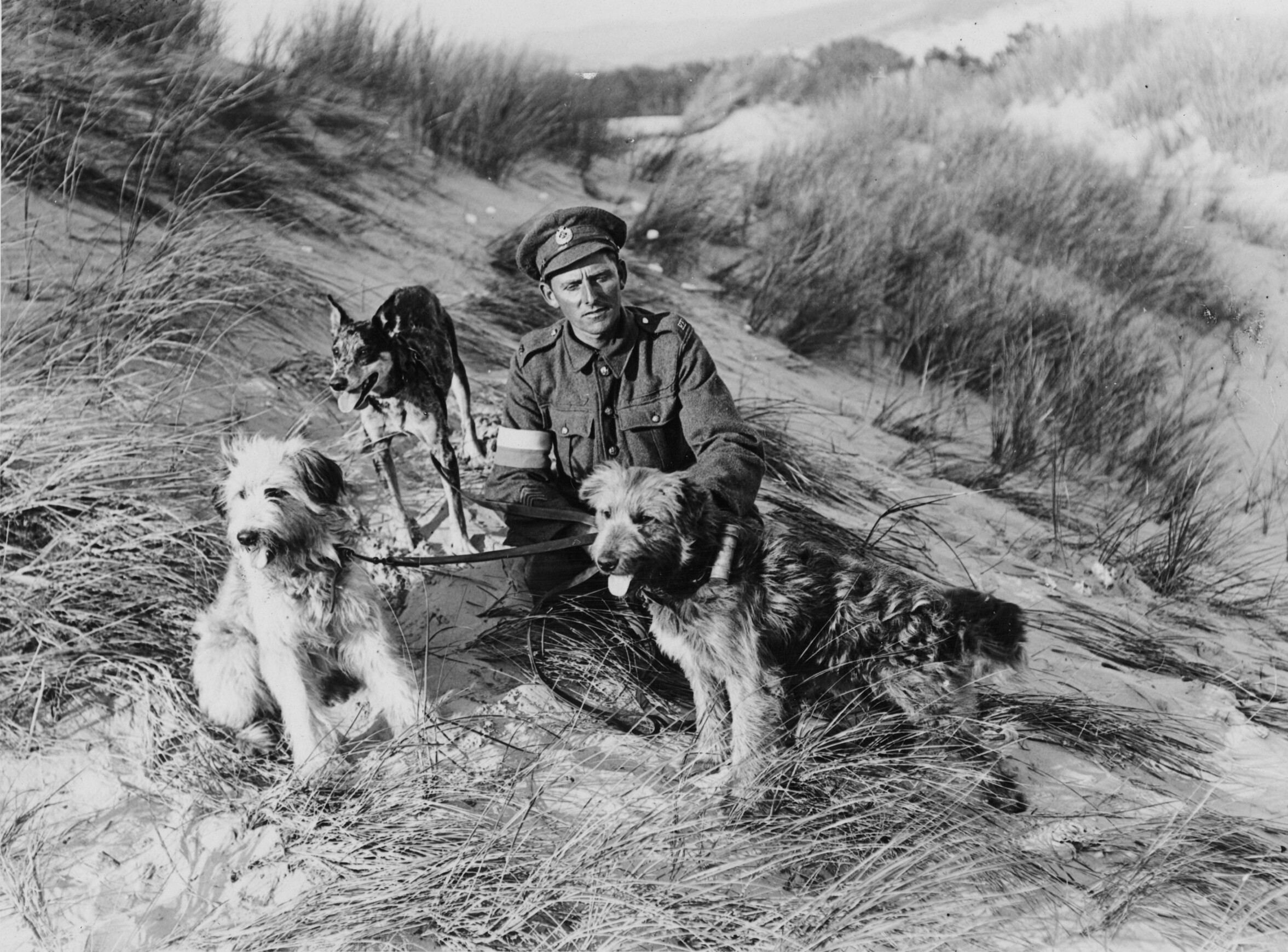
Handler with his messenger dogs, in service with the British Army, in France during World War I, 1 January 1918

About the time World War I broke out, many European communities used dogs to pull small carts for milk deliveries and similar purposes. Several European armies adapted the process for military use. In August 1914, the Belgian Army used dogs to pull their Maxim guns on wheeled carriages and supplies or reportedly even wounded in their carts. Two dogs of the sturdy and docile Martin Belge breed were used to pull each machine gun or ammunition cart. Already in common civilian use and cheap to buy and feed, the dogs proved hardier and more suitable for military use under fire than packhorses. The dogs were officially withdrawn from military use in December 1916, although several months were needed before horse-drawn carts and motor vehicles had fully replaced them.

The French had 250 dogs at the start of World War I. The Dutch army copied the idea and had hundreds of dogs trained and ready by the end of World War I (the Netherlands remained neutral). The Soviet Red Army also used dogs to drag wounded men to aid stations during World War II. The dogs were well-suited to transporting loads over snow and through craters.

Dogs were often used to carry messages in battle. They were turned loose to move silently to a second handler. This required a dog that was very loyal to two masters, otherwise the dog would not deliver the message on time or at all. Some messenger dogs also performed other communication jobs, such as pulling telephone lines or cables from one location to another.

A 2-kilogram (4-pound) Yorkshire terrier named Smoky was used to run a telegraph wire through a 10-to-20-centimetre-diameter (4-to-8-inch), 21-metre-long (70-foot) pipe to ensure communication without moving troops into the line of fire.

=== Mascots ===
Dogs were often used as unit mascots for military units. The dog in question might be an officer's dog, an animal that the unit chose to adopt, or one of their canines employed in another role as a working dog. Some naval dogs such as Sinbad and Judy were themselves enlisted service members. Some units also chose to employ a particular breed of dog as their standard mascot, with new dogs replacing the old when it died or was retired. The presence of a mascot was designed to lift morale, and many were used to this effect in the trenches of World War I. An example of this would be Sergeant Stubby for the US Army.

=== Vietnam ===
The plight of the MWDs in Vietnam led to much campaigning by veterans and animal organizations. The campaigning finally led to the following alteration in the way military dogs are treated by law: President Bill Clinton made it a law that all military dogs were considered veterans, which allowed them to come home after service. The Vietnam War provided invaluable service from military working dogs, but also highlighted the failure in their post-service welfare. The initial policies leading to the abandonment and euthanasia of these loyal animals led to record activism that culminated in historic legislative reform. MWDs are now revered and admired for their service and are assured of the care and dignity they rightly deserve in retirement.

=== Medical research ===
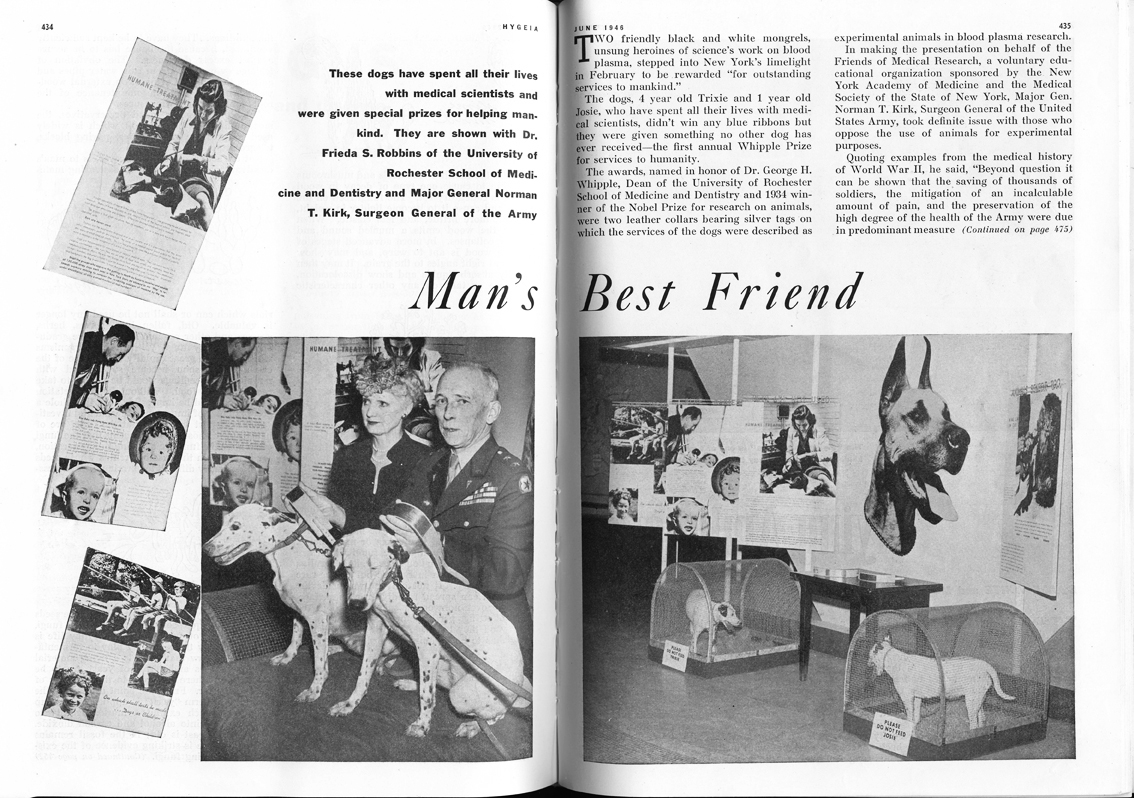
Medical researchers, and their allies in the armed forces, awarded military-style medals to animals in laboratories to emphasize the martial significance of animal experimentation. Here, Army Surgeon General Major General Norman T. Kirk, on behalf of the Friends of Medical Research, bestows medals upon research dogs Trixie and Josie "for outstanding services to humanity."

In World War II, dogs took on a new role in medical experimentation, as the primary animals chosen for medical research. The animal experimentation allowed doctors to test new medicines without risking human lives, though these practices came under more scrutiny after the war. The United States' government responded by proclaiming these dogs as heroes.

The Cold War sparked a heated debate over the ethics of animal experimentation in the U.S., particularly aimed at how canines were treated in World War II. In 1966, major reforms came to this field with the adoption of the Laboratory Animal Welfare Act.

=== Injured on the Battlefield ===
Handlers are trained to apply first aid on the battlefield for their injured dogs. U.S. Marine Corps Forces use realistic dog mannequins that respond by whimpering and barking. The handler is trained to triage (apply first aid) on the battlefield to check for heart pulsations, massive bleeding, amputations, collapsed lungs, etc.

=== Detection and tracking ===
Many dogs were used to locate mines. They did not prove to be very effective under combat conditions. Marine mine detecting dogs were trained using bare electric wires beneath the ground surface. The wires shocked the dogs, teaching them that danger lurked under the soil. Once the dog's focus was properly directed, dummy mines were planted and the dogs were trained to signal their presence. While the dogs effectively found the mines, the task proved so stressful for the dogs they were only able to work between 20 and 30 minutes at a time. The mine-detecting war dogs anticipated random shocks from the heretofore friendly earth, making them extremely nervous. The useful service life of the dogs was not long. Experiments with laboratory rats show that this trend can be very extreme; in some tests, rats even huddled in the corner to the point of starvation to avoid electric shock.

Dogs have historically also been used in many cases to track fugitives and enemy troops, overlapping partly into the duties of a scout dog, but use their olfactory skill in tracking a scent, rather than warning a handler at the initial presentation of a scent.

=== Scouts ===
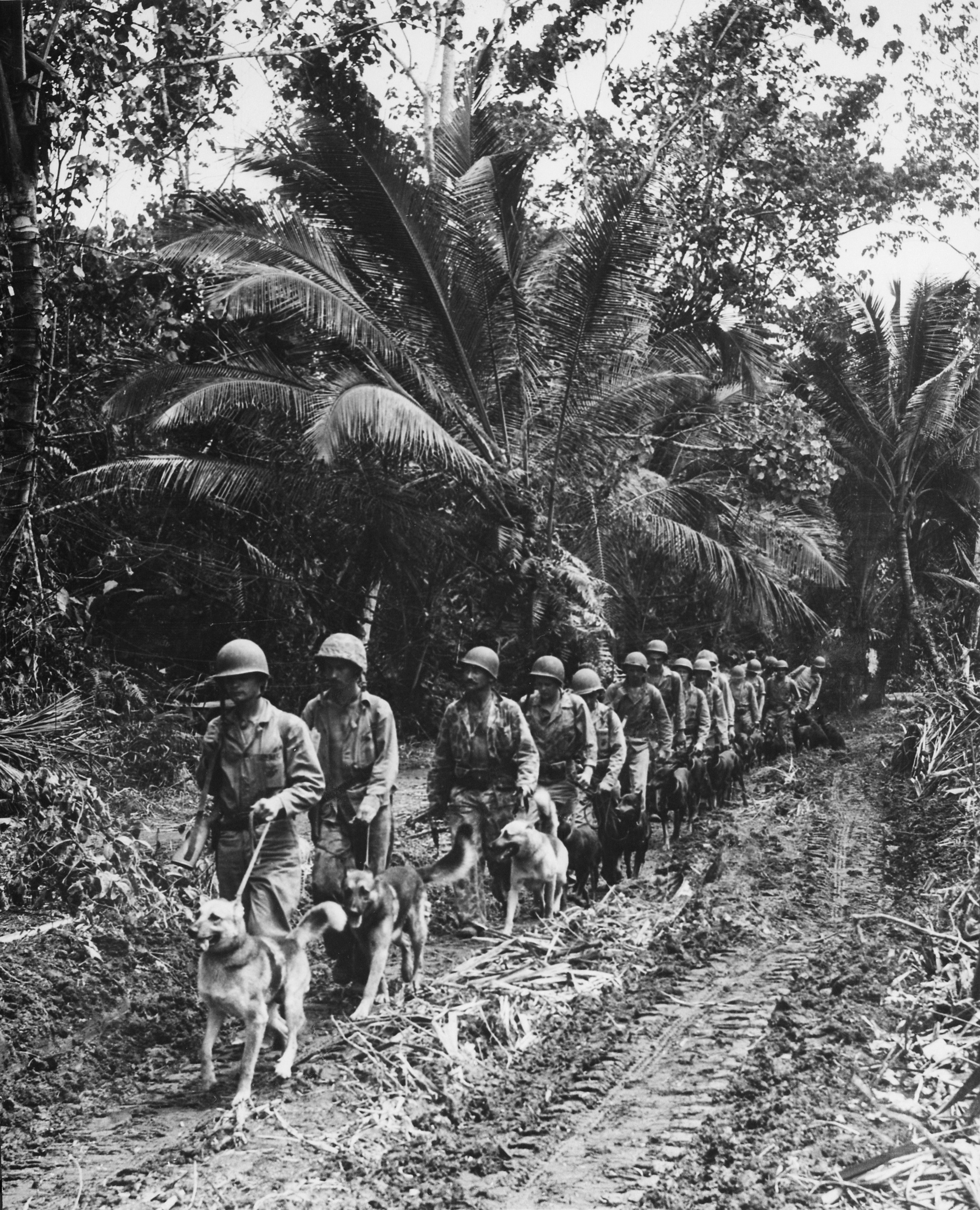
Scouting and messenger dogs, in service with the United States Marine Raiders, walking with their handlers to the frontline against the Imperial Japanese Army during the Bougainville campaign of World War II, November/December 1943

All scout dogs must be taught the difference between human and animal scent. Some dogs are trained to silently locate booby traps and concealed enemies such as snipers. The dog's keen senses of smell and hearing would make them far more effective at detecting these dangers than humans. The best scout dogs are described as having a disposition intermediate to docile tracking dogs and aggressive attack dogs. Scouting dogs are able to identify the opposing threat within 1,000 yards of area. This method of scouting is more efficient compared to human senses.

Scout dogs were used in World War II, Korea, and Vietnam by the United States to detect ambushes, weapon caches, or enemy fighters hiding under water, with only reed breathing straws showing above the waterline. The US operated a number of scout-dog platoons (assigned on a handler-and-dog team basis to individual patrols) and had a dedicated dog-training school in Fort Benning, Georgia.

=== Sentries ===
One of the earliest military-related uses, sentry dogs were used to defend camps or other priority areas at night and sometimes during the day. They would bark or growl to alert guards of a stranger's presence. During the Cold War, the American military used sentry dog teams outside of nuclear weapons storage areas. A test program was conducted in Vietnam to test sentry dogs, launched two days after a successful Viet Cong attack on Da Nang Air Base (July 1, 1965). Forty dog teams were deployed to Vietnam for a four-month test period, with teams placed on the perimeter in front of machine gun towers/bunkers. The detection of intruders resulted in a rapid deployment of reinforcements. The test was successful, so the handlers returned to the US while the dogs were reassigned to new handlers. The Air Force immediately started to ship dog teams to all the bases in Vietnam and Thailand.

The buildup of American forces in Vietnam created large dog sections at USAF Southeast Asia (SEA) bases; 467 dogs were eventually assigned to Bien Hoa, Binh Thuy, Cam Ranh Bay, Da Nang, Nha Trang, Tuy Hoa, Phù Cát, Phan Rang, Tan Son Nhut, and Pleiku Air Bases. Within a year of deployment, attacks on several bases had been stopped when the enemy forces were detected by dog teams. Captured Vietcong told of the fear and respect that they had for the dogs. The Vietcong even placed a bounty on lives of handlers and dogs. The success of sentry dogs was determined by the lack of successful penetrations of bases in Vietnam and Thailand. The United States War Dogs Association estimated that war dogs saved over 10,000 U.S. lives in Vietnam. Sentry Dogs were also used by the Army, Navy, and Marines to protect the perimeter of a large bases.

=== Modern uses ===
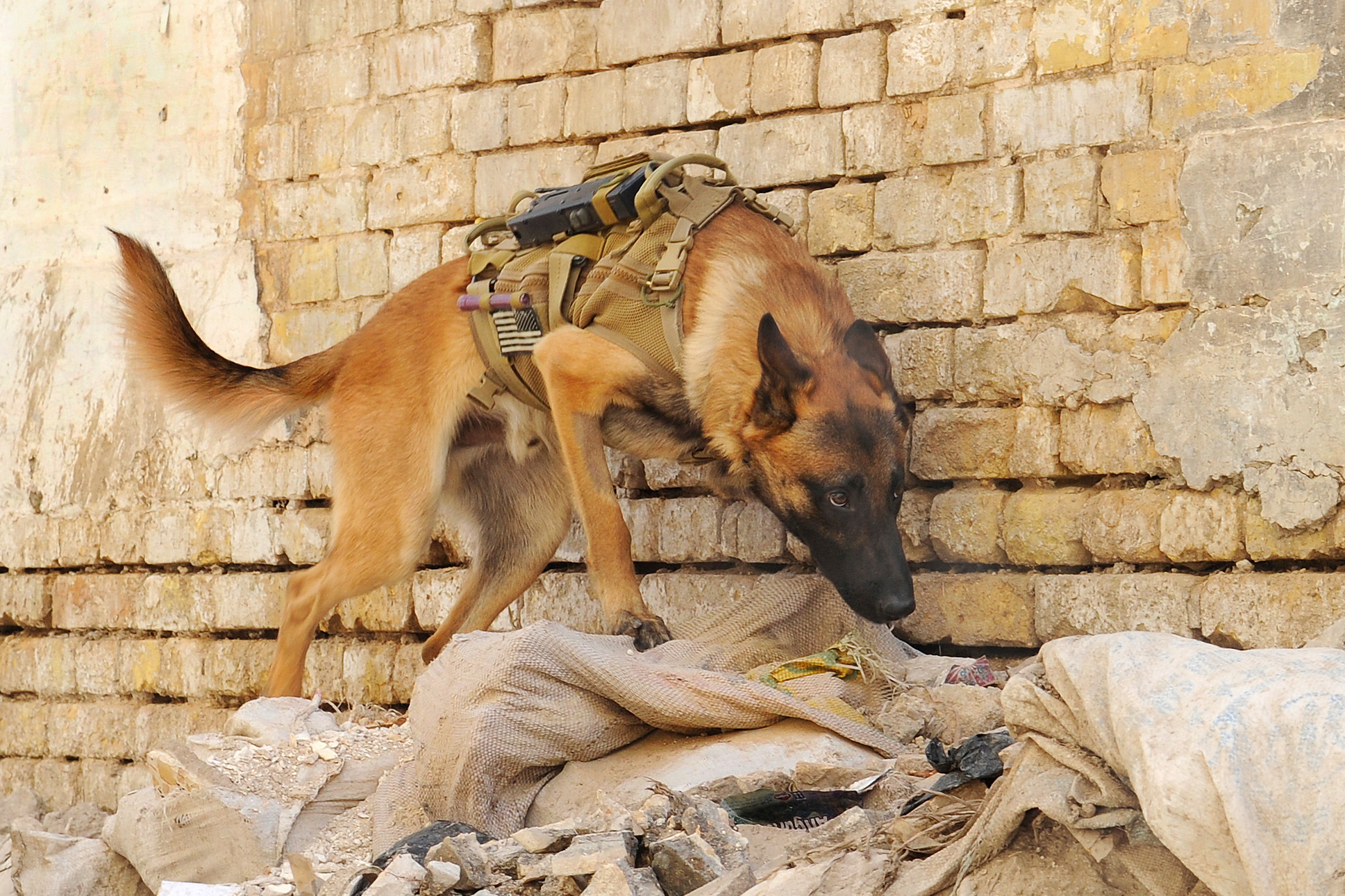
A detection dog, in service with the United States Army, searches rubble outside of a target building in Al-Rusafa, Baghdad, during the Iraq War, 28 February 2009

Contemporary dogs in military roles are also often referred to as police dogs, or in the United States and United Kingdom as a military working dog (MWD), or K-9. Their roles are nearly as varied as those of their ancient relatives, though they tend to be more rarely used in front-line formations. As of 2011, 600 U.S. MWDs were actively participating in the conflicts in Iraq and Afghanistan.

Traditionally, the most common breed for these police-type operations has been the German Shepherd; in recent years, a shift has been made to smaller dogs with keener senses of smell for detection work, and more resilient breeds such as the Belgian Malinois and Dutch Shepherd for patrolling and law enforcement. All MWDs in use today are paired with a single individual after their training. This person is called a handler. While a handler usually does not stay with one dog for the length of either's career, usually a handler stays partnered with a dog for at least a year, and sometimes much longer. However, the length of the time with the dog and handler is very important. There must be trust between the two for things to work properly and smoothly. The handler must trust the dogs instincts to find a specific scent.

The latest canine tactical vests are outfitted with cameras and durable microphones that allow dogs to relay audio and visual information to their handlers.

In the 1970s, the US Air Force used over 1,600 dogs worldwide. Today, personnel cutbacks have reduced USAF dog teams to around 530, stationed throughout the world. Many dogs that operate in these roles are trained at Lackland Air Force Base, the only United States facility that currently trains dogs for military use. High Dive dog training is where the dog jumps from a military plane with their handler.

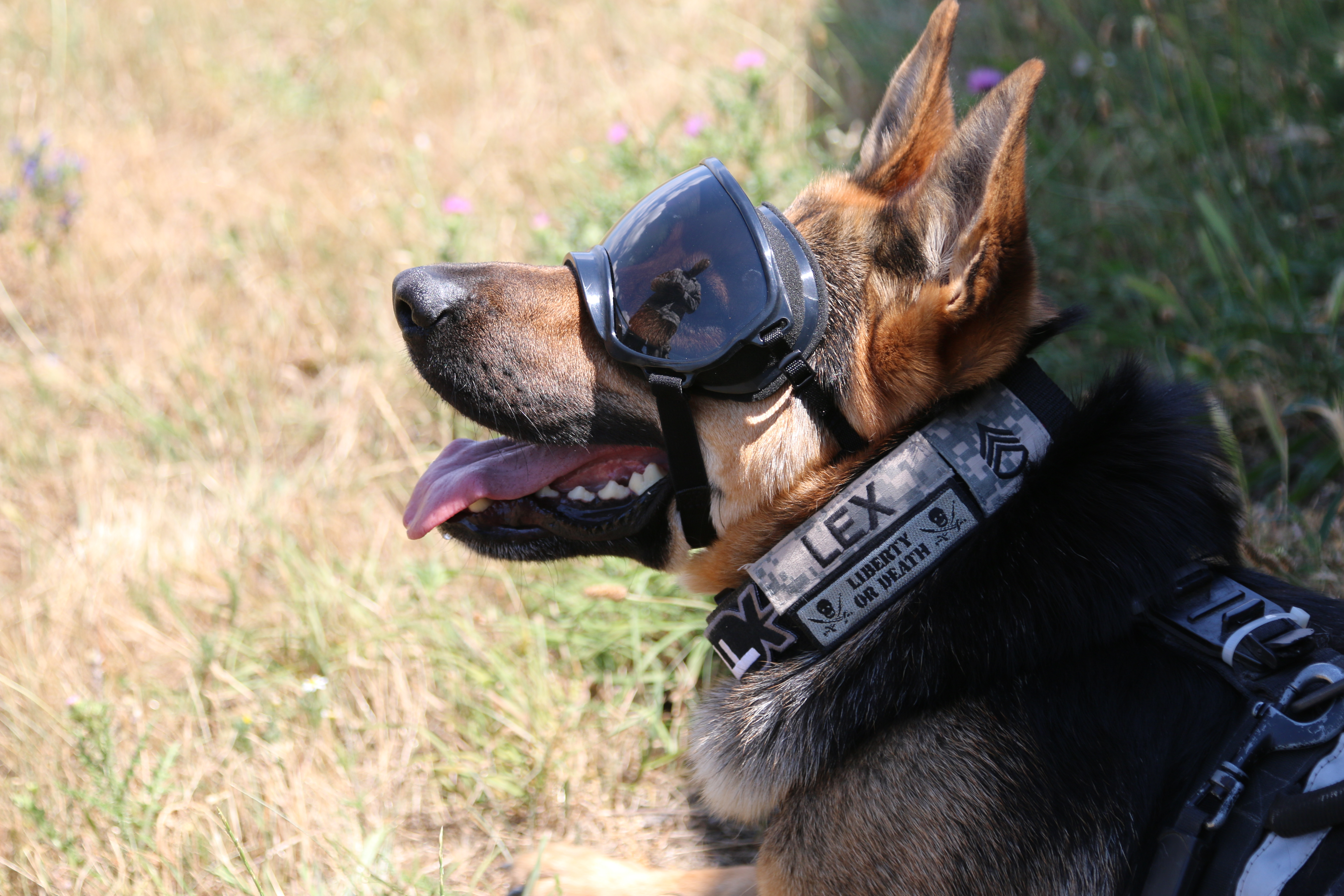
A war dog, in service with the United States Army, participating in a training event at Camp Bondsteel with the NATO-led Kosovo Force, 23 July 2015

Change has also come in legislation for the benefit of the canines. Prior to 2000, older war dogs were required to be euthanized. The new law permits adoption of retired military dogs. One notable case of which was Lex, a working dog whose handler was killed in Iraq.

Numerous memorials are dedicated to war dogs, including at March Field Air Museum in Riverside, California; the Infantry School at Fort Benning, Georgia; at the Naval Facility, Guam, with replicas at the University of Tennessee College of Veterinary Medicine in Knoxville; the Alfred M. Gray Marine Corps Research Center in Quantico, Virginia; and the Alabama War Dogs Memorial at the USS Alabama Battleship Memorial Park in Mobile, Alabama.

==== Law enforcement ====
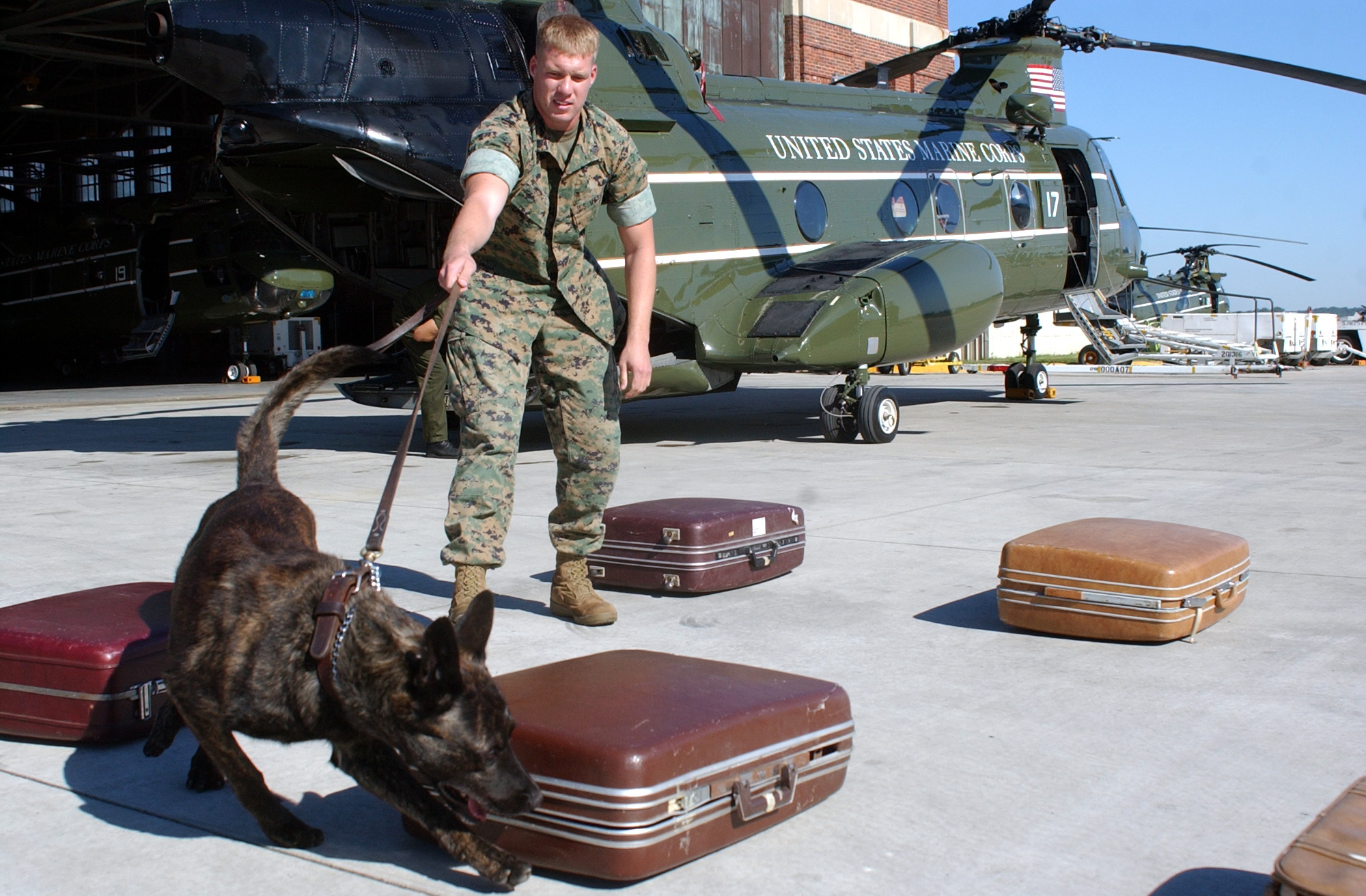
A detection dog, in service with the United States Marine Corps, inspects baggage for loading with HMX-1, 14 March 2008

As a partner in everyday military police work, dogs can chase suspects, track them if they are hidden, and guard them when they are caught. They are trained to respond if their handler is attacked, and otherwise not to react at all unless they are commanded to do so by their handler. Many police dogs are also trained in detection, as well.

==== Drug and explosives detection ====
Both MWDs and their civilian counterparts provide service in drug detection, sniffing out a broad range of psychoactive substances despite efforts at concealment. Provided they have been trained to detect it, MWDs can smell small traces of nearly any substance, even if it is in a sealed container. Dogs trained in drug detection are normally used at ports of embarkation such as airports, checkpoints, and other places where security and a need for anti-contraband measures exist.

MWDs can also be trained to detect explosives. As with narcotics, trained MWDs can detect minuscule amounts of a wide range of explosives, making them useful for searching entry points, patrolling within secure installations, and at checkpoints. These dogs are capable of achieving over a 98% success rate in bomb detection.

==== Intimidation ====
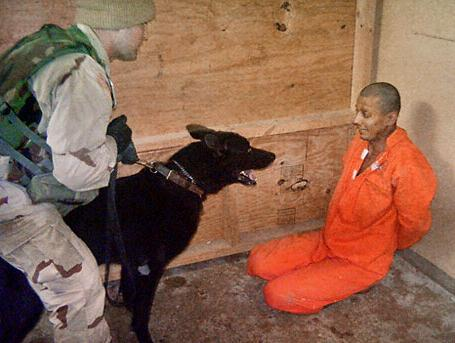
An Iraqi prisoner is intimidated by an American soldier via his service dog at Abu Ghraib prison during the 2003 invasion of Iraq.

The use of MWDs on prisoners by the United States during recent wars in Afghanistan and Iraq has been controversial. Dog ownership in the Middle East is relatively uncommon, as many Muslims consider dogs unclean.

Iraq War: The United States has used dogs to intimidate prisoners in Iraqi prisons. In court testimony following the revelations of Abu Ghraib prisoner abuse, it was stated that Colonel Thomas M. Pappas approved the use of dogs for interrogations. Private Ivan L. Frederick testified that interrogators were authorized to use dogs and that a civilian contract interrogator left him lists of the cells he wanted dog handlers to visit. "They were allowed to use them to ... intimidate inmates", Frederick stated. Two soldiers, Sergeant Santos A. Cardona and Sergeant Michael J. Smith, were then charged with maltreatment of detainees, for allegedly encouraging and permitting unmuzzled working dogs to threaten and attack them. Prosecutors have focused on an incident caught in published photographs, when the two men allegedly cornered a naked detainee and allowed the dogs to bite him on each thigh as he cowered in fear.

Guantanamo Bay: The use of dogs to intimidate prisoners in Iraq is believed to have been learned from practices at Guantanamo Bay Naval Base. The use of dogs on prisoners by regular U.S. forces in Guantanamo Bay Naval Base was prohibited by Donald Rumsfeld in April 2003. A few months later, revelations of abuses at Abu Ghraib prison were aired, including use of dogs to terrify naked prisoners; Rumsfeld then issued a further order prohibiting their use by the regular U.S. forces in Iraq.

==== Retirement ====
Traditionally, as in World War II, US MWDs were returned home after the war, to their former owners or new adoptive ones. The Vietnam War was different in that U.S. war dogs were designated as expendable equipment and were either euthanized or turned over to an allied army prior to the U.S. departure from South Vietnam. Due to lobbying efforts by veteran dog handlers from the Vietnam War, Congress approved a bill allowing veteran U.S. MWDs to be adopted after their military service. In 2000, President Bill Clinton signed a law that allowed these dogs to be adopted, making the Vietnam War the only American war in which U.S. war dogs never came home. Now it is something any K-9 owner can do in the workforce after the dog retires. The same goes for police dogs that were in the service as well.

==== Other roles ====
Military working dogs continue to serve as sentries, trackers, search and rescue, scouts, and mascots. Retired MWDs are often adopted as pets or therapy dogs.

== Gallery ==
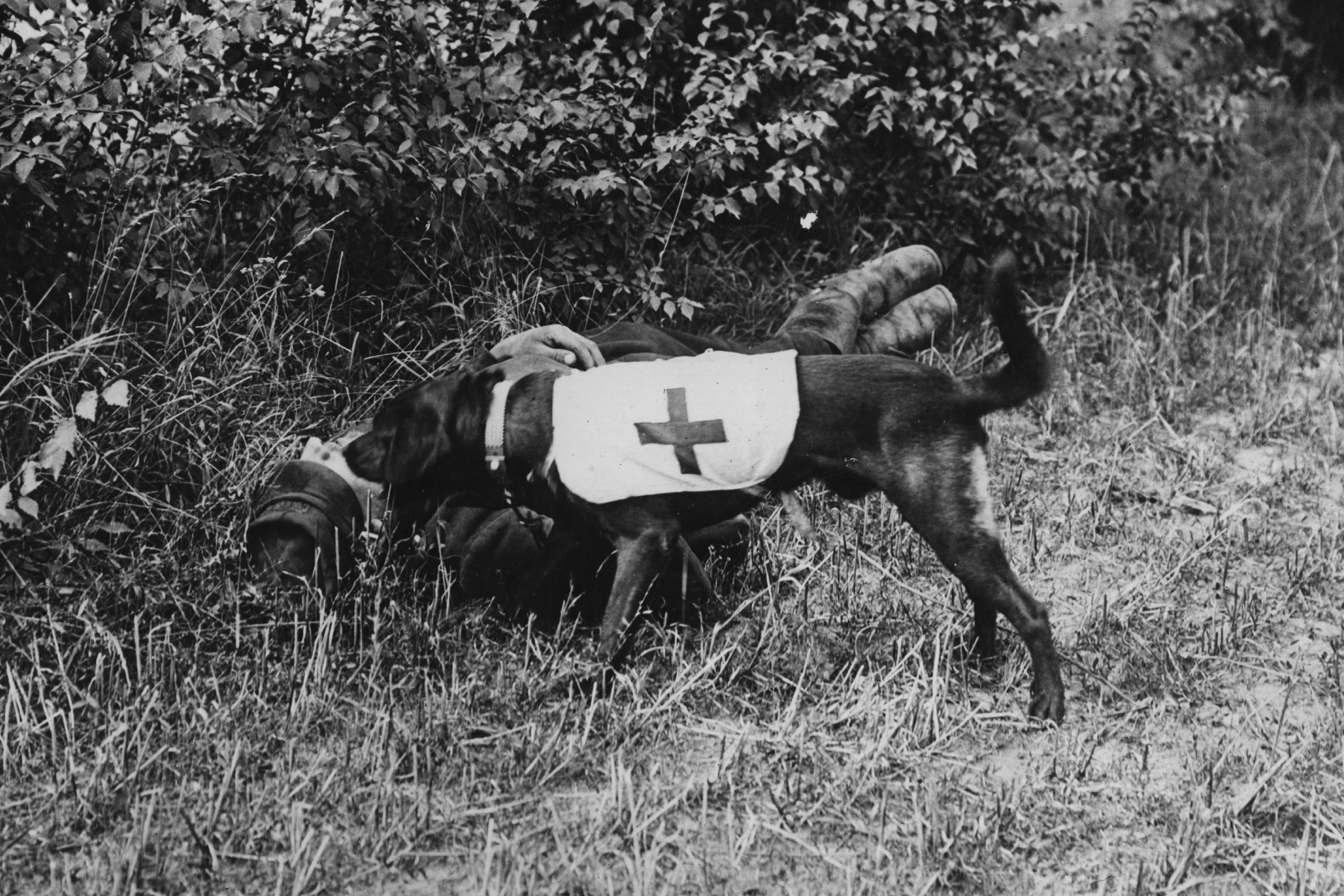
Ambulance dogs search for wounded men through scent and hearing.

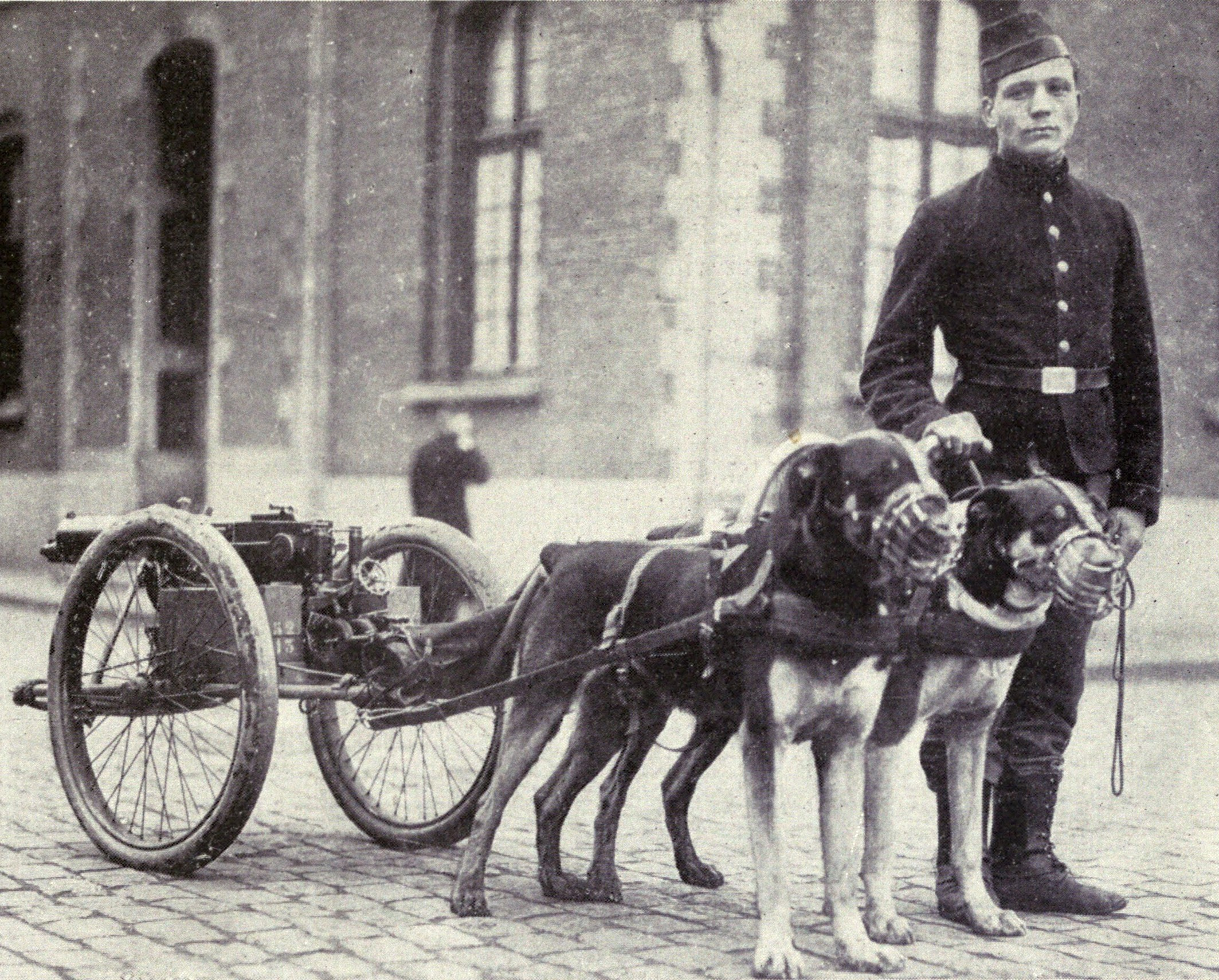
Belgian dogs trained to draw machine guns

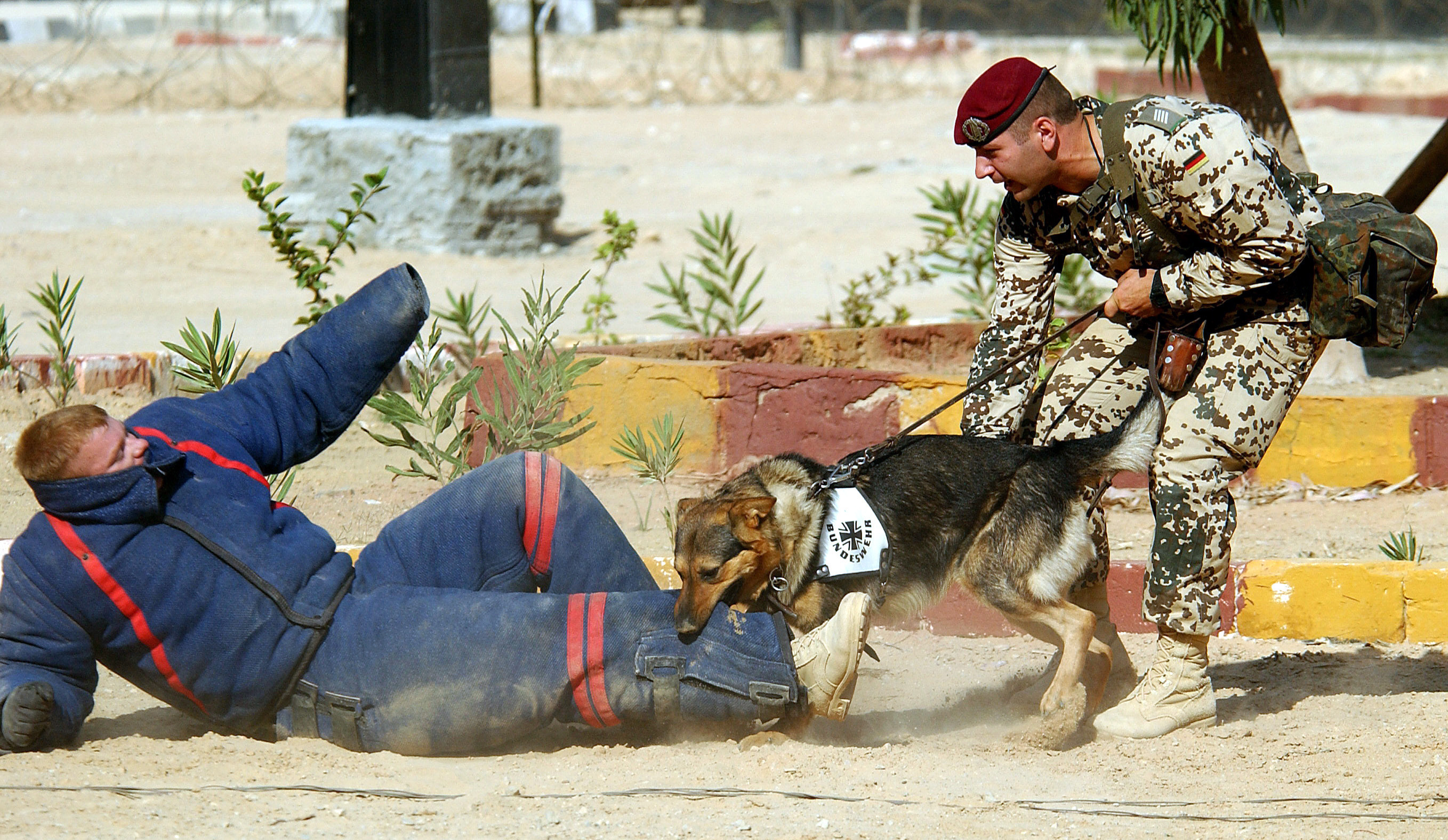
A German Shepherd at the German Bundeswehr dog demonstration

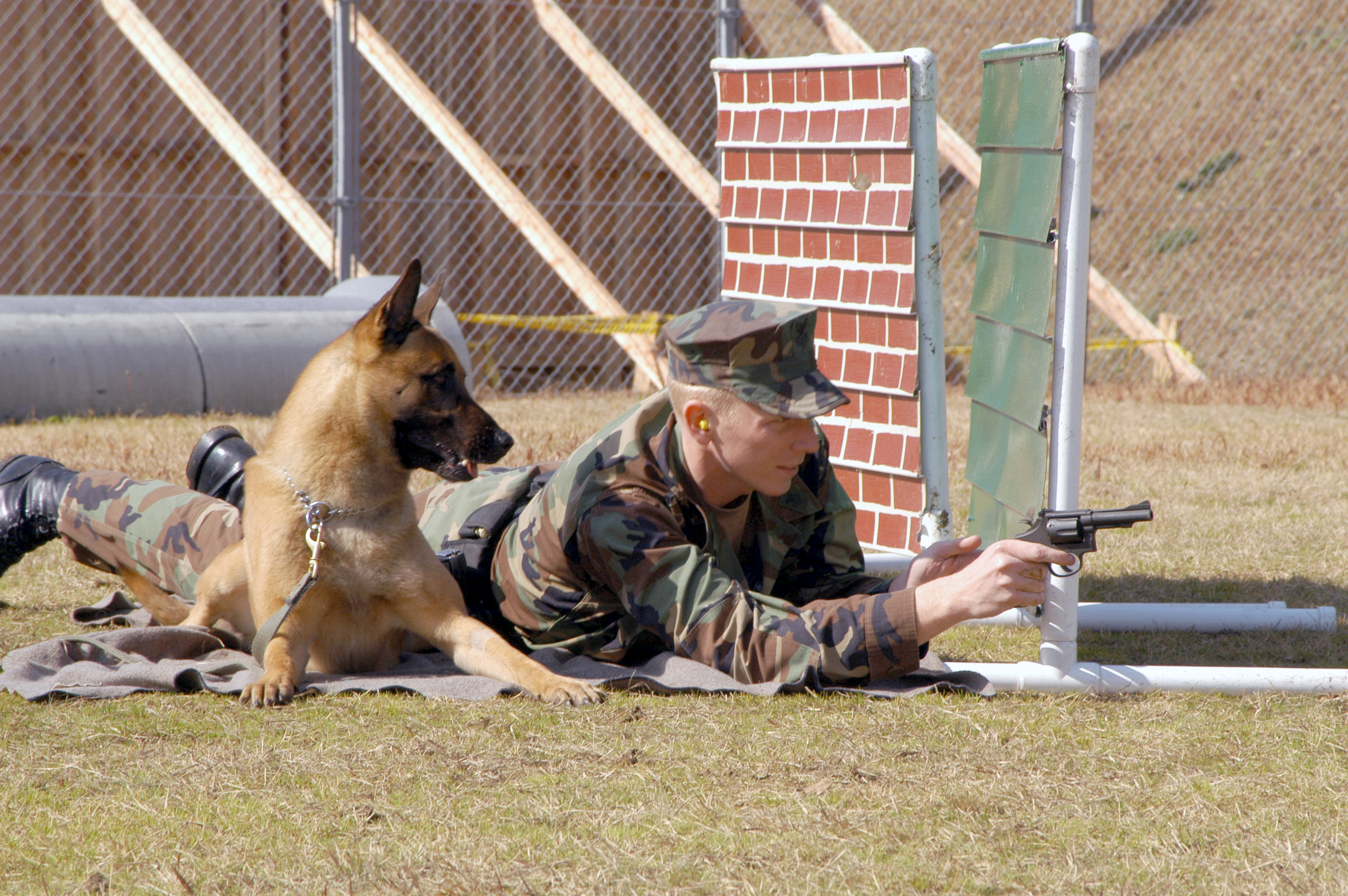
A Navy Master-at-arms fires blank ammunition to condition his dog to the sound.

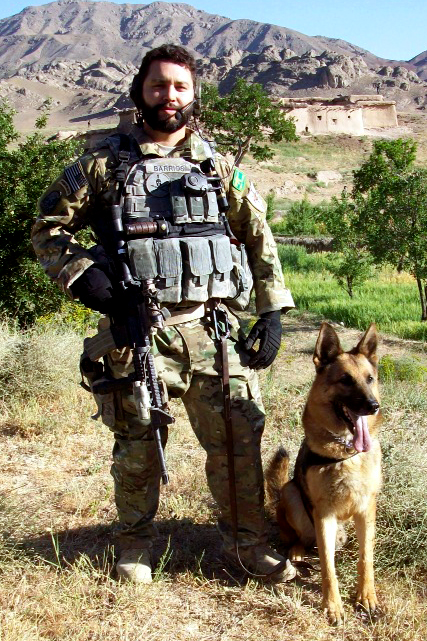
A U.S. Air Force Security Forces dog handler attached to the Army's 3rd Special Forces Group in Afghanistan with a German Shepherd

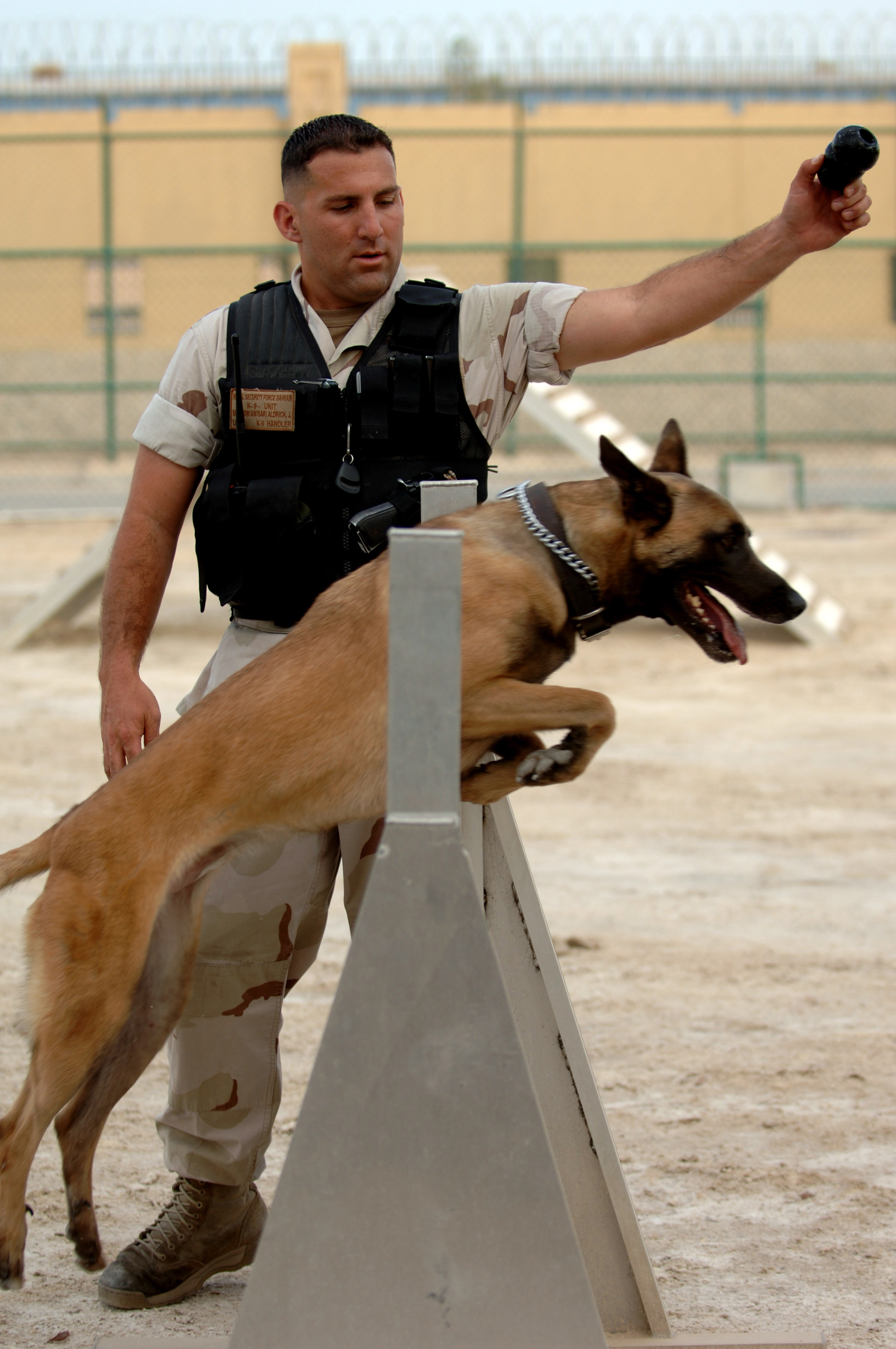
U.S. Naval Security Force K-9 Unit training

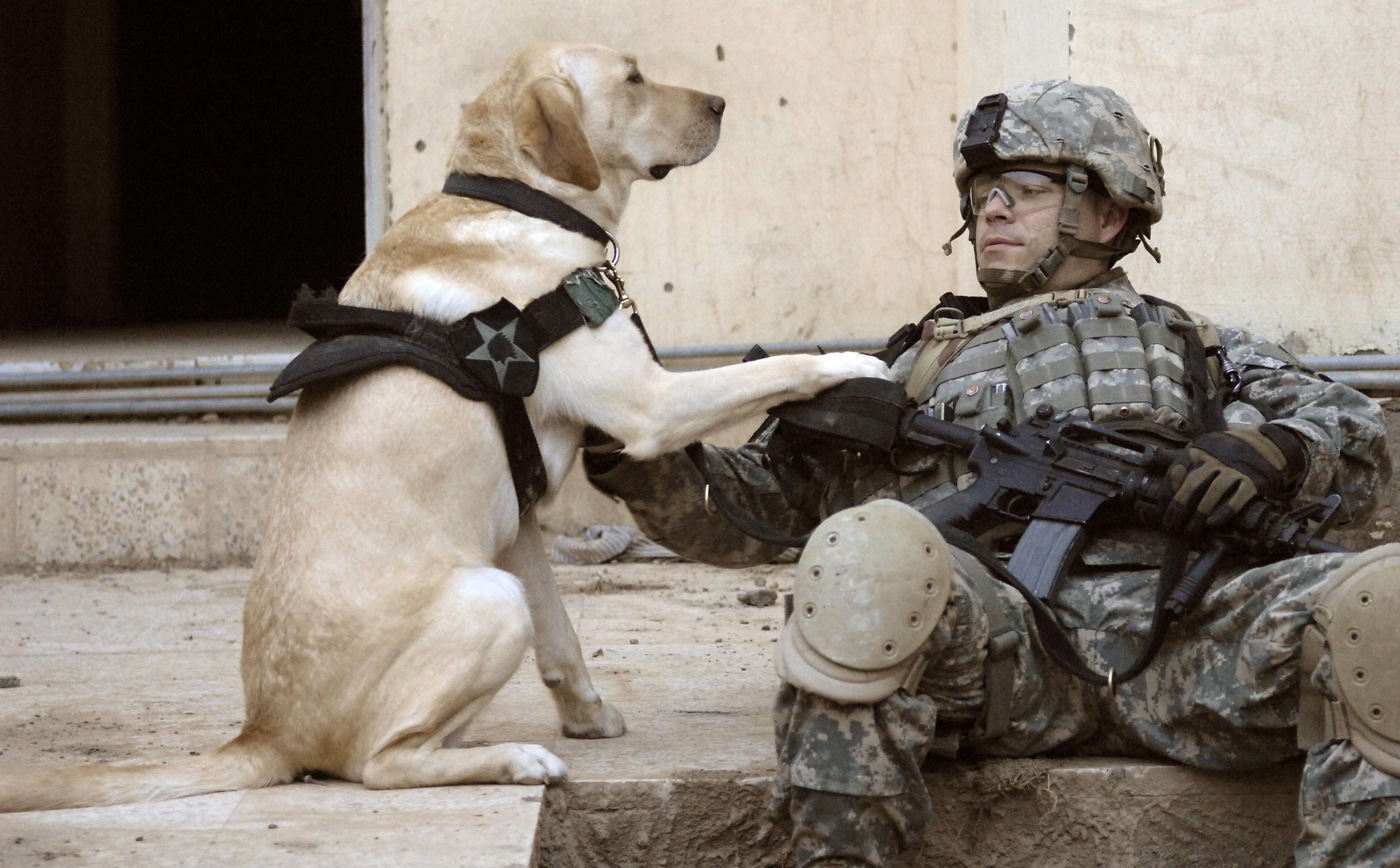
A U.S. soldier and his Labrador Retriever dog wait before conducting an assault against insurgents in Buhriz.

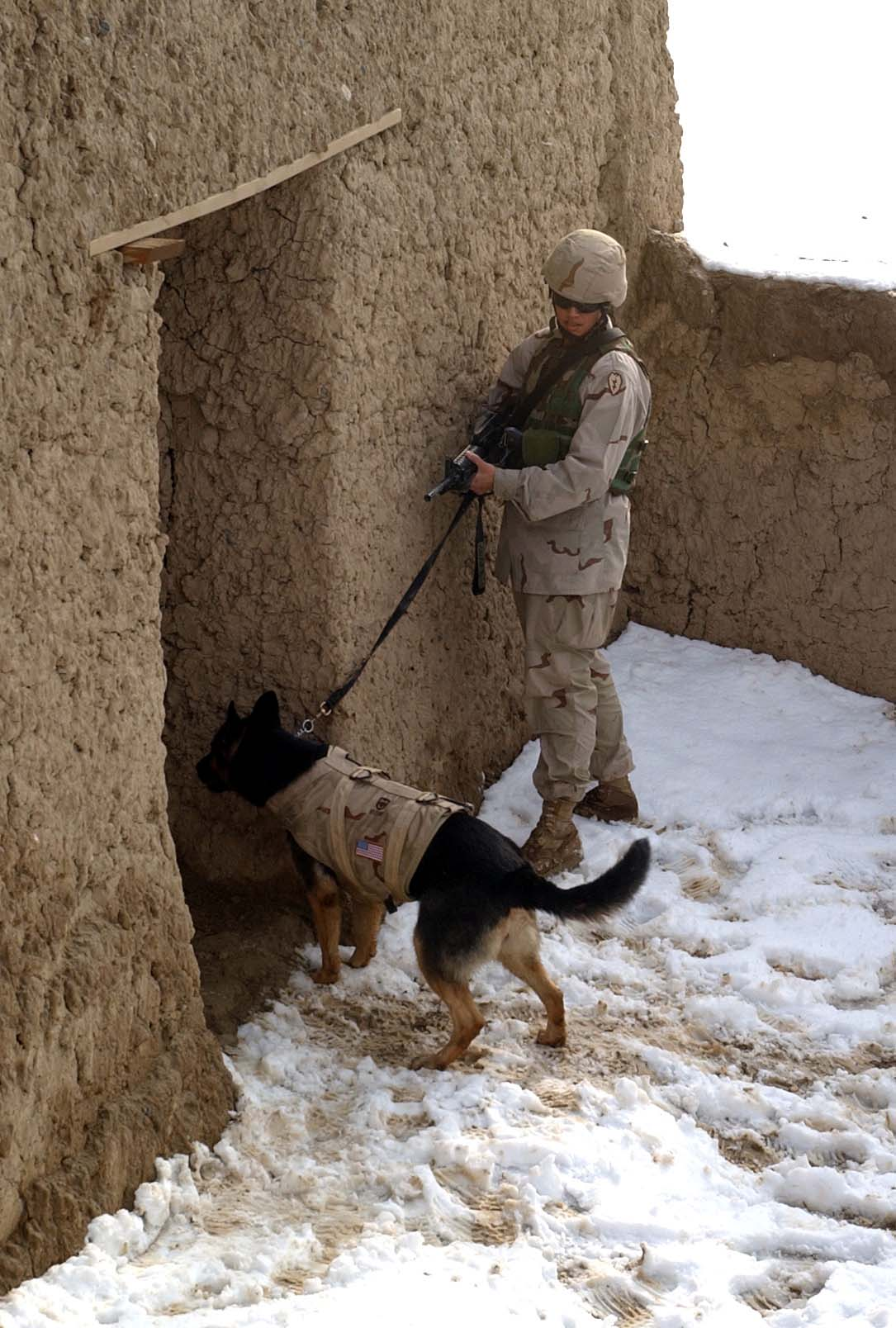
U.S. Army working dog, a German Shepherd, wearing body armor clears a building in Afghanistan.

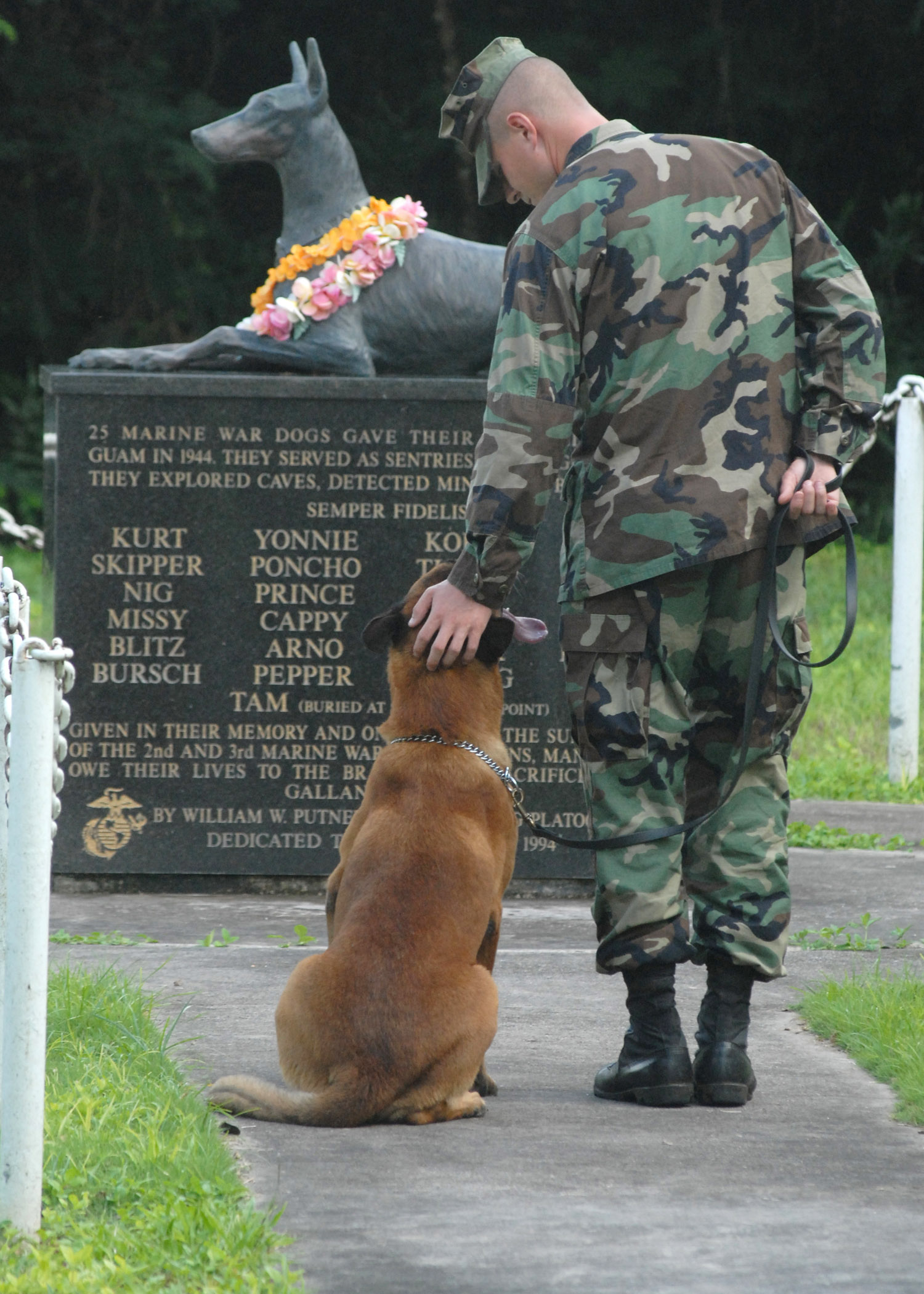
U.S. Navy handler with a Military Working Dog paying respects at the National War Dog Cemetery, Naval Base Guam

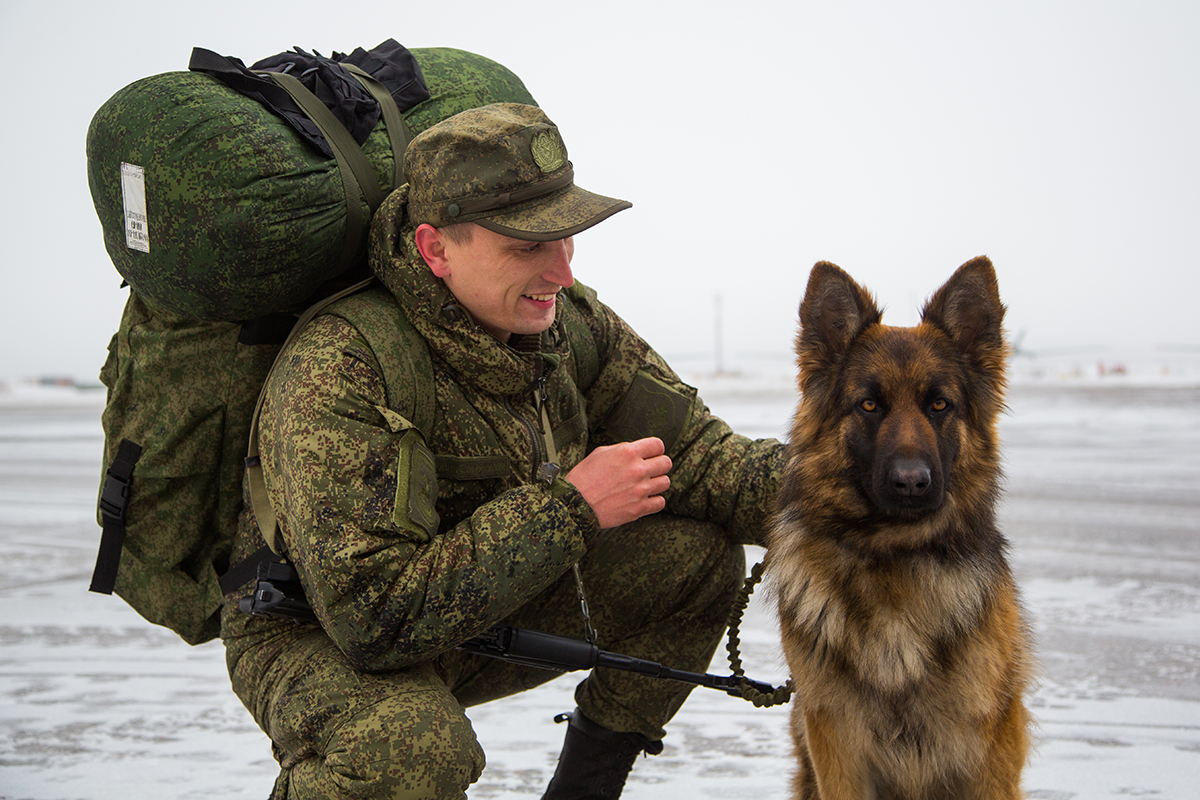
Russian sapper with his German Shepherd mine detection dog in Syria

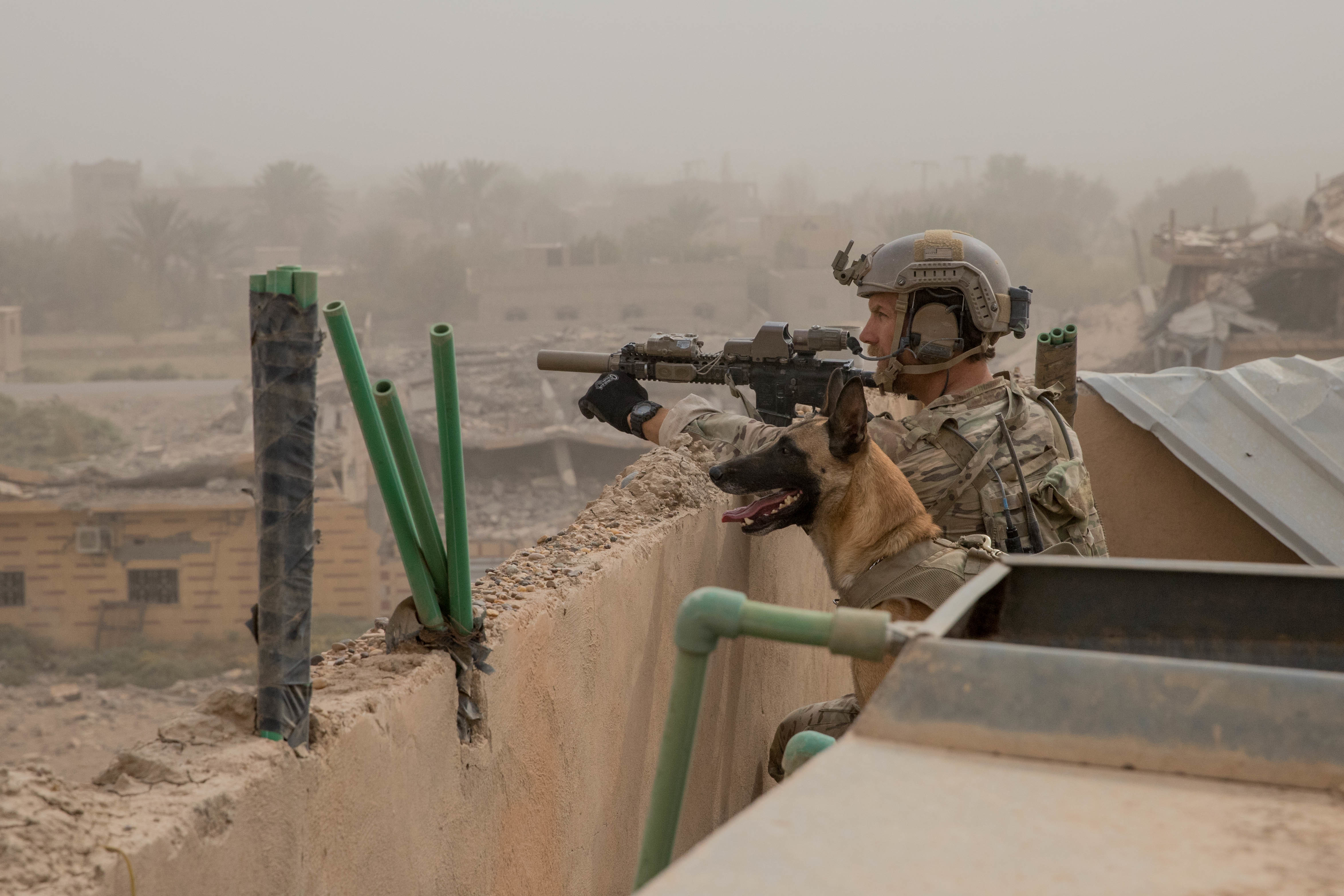
A Special Forces operator in Syria alongside a SF Multi-Purpose Canine provides security for a nearby mortar position during the Deir ez-Zor campaign, October 11, 2018

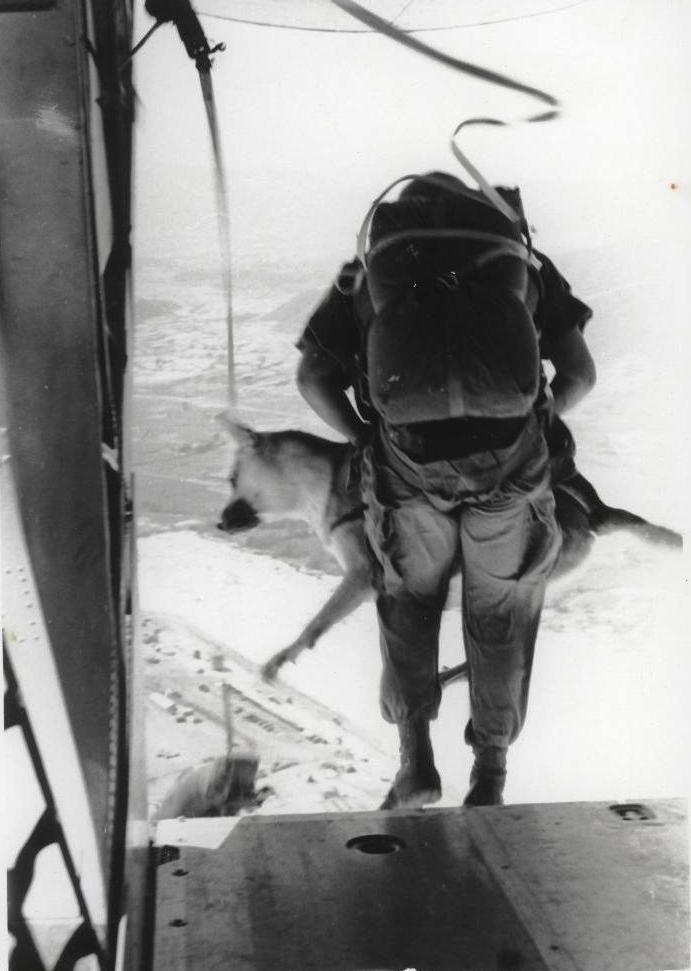
A US Marine conducts a parachute jump with his war dog over Da Nang, Vietnam, August 1968

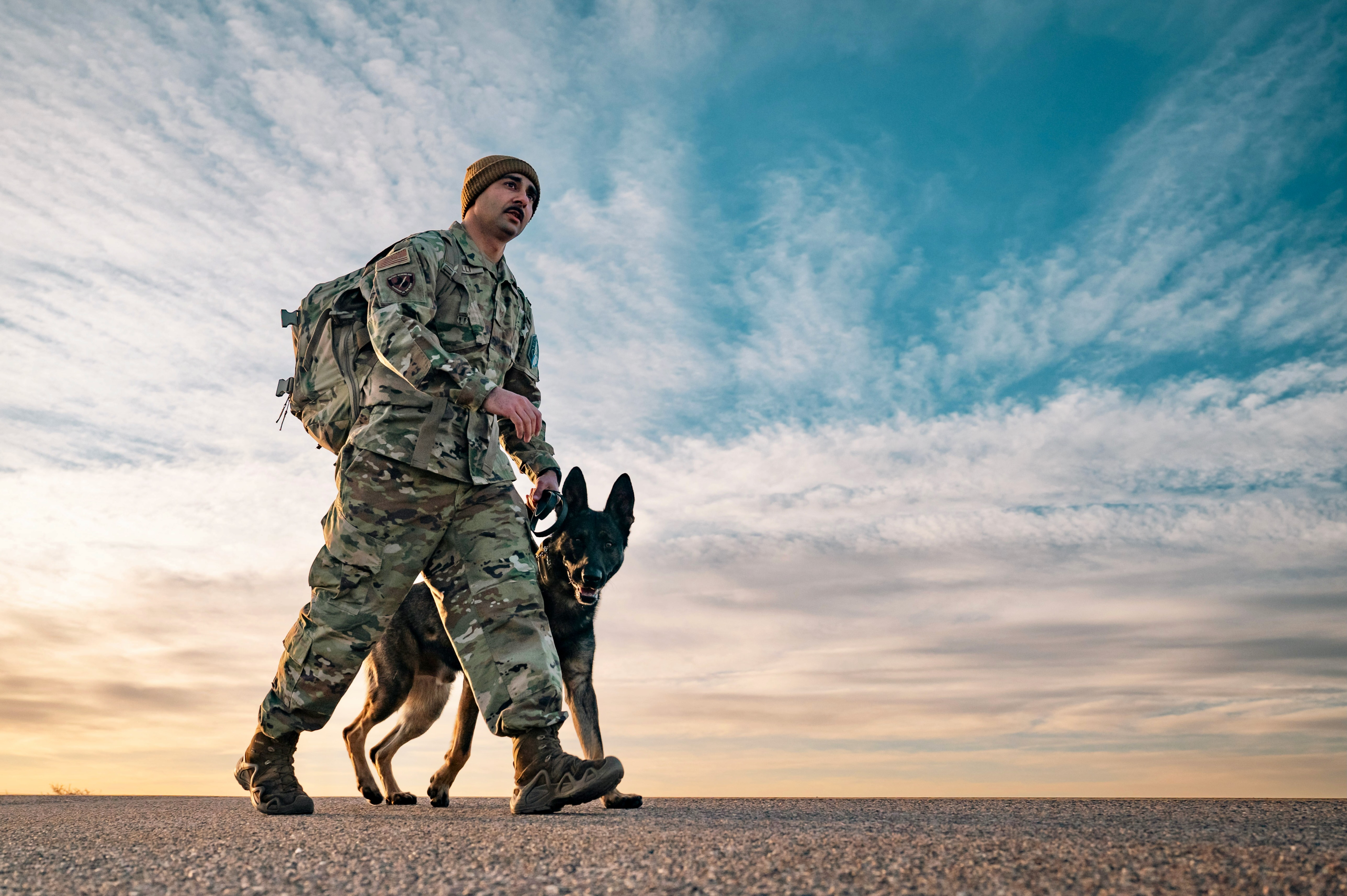
USAF airman completing a ruck march with his military working dog

== In popular culture ==
- I'd Like to Give my Dog to Uncle Sam (1944 Song), about a blind man who wishes to have his dog enlisted in the military during World War II. The dog is a service dog; its owner refers to himself as a "blind boy"
- Max (2015 film), tells the fictional story of an American military dog rehabilitating into public life after his owner dies in combat.
- Megan Leavey, (2017 film) tells the true story of US Marine corporal Megan Leavey and her military working dog Rex.
- War Dog: A Soldier's Best Friend (2017), HBO feature documentary about soldier-canine relationships at war.
- Sgt. Stubby: An American Hero (2018 film), tells the story of a stray dog who befriends an Army battalion during World War I.
- Dog (2022 film), tells the fictional story of an American Army Ranger who must escort his deceased partner's military dog to his funeral.
- Finding Rin Tin Tin (2007 Film), Rin Tin Tin was a real German Shepherd who became a Hollywood star after being rescued by an American soldier during World War I.
- Army Dog (2016 Film), “Army Dog is another family-friendly film, following Army sergeant Tom Holloway and his dog Conner, who return to the U.S. after a highly successful mission and aim to settle back into family life."
- Dog Jack (2010 Film), This dog war film is set during the American Civil War and follows the harrowing story of Benjamin Gardner, an enslaved man who escapes and eventually joins the Union Army to secure his freedom alongside his loyal dog named Jack.
- Books about Antis, a puppy rescued in WWII from no man's land in France by Czech fighter pilot Robert Bozdech:
  - Lewis, Damien (2013). War Dog: The No-Man's Land Puppy Who Took To the Skies. London: Sphere. ISBN 978-0751552751.
  - Richardson, Anthony (1961). One Man and His Dog. New York: Dutton. ISBN 978-1844155903.
  - Ross, Hamish (2007). Freedom in the Air: A Czech Flyer and His Aircrew Dog. Pen & Sword Aviation. ISBN 978-1844155903.
  - Kadohata, Cynthia (2007). Cracker! The Best Dog in Vietnam. Atheneum. ISBN 978-1416906384.
  - Damien Lewis (2014). The Dog Who Could Fly: The Incredible True Story of a WWII Airman and the Four-Legged Hero Who Flew At His Side. ISBN 978-1476739144.

== See also ==
- Ancient warfare – War through the end of the ancient period
- Animals in War Memorial – War memorial in London, England, London
- Dickin Medal – Award for animals in wartime, UK honour awarded to animals "for gallantry"
- Dogs of Roman Britain
- Examples of dogs that gained notability in war
- List of individual dogs
- National War Dog Cemetery – US military memorial in Guam, United States
- Parachuting animals
- Riot dog, a term used by media denoting dogs that accompany street protesters
- Working dog – Dog trained to perform practical tasks
- Oketz – Canine special forces (sayeret) unit of the Israel Defense Forces.
