= Late Extra =

1935 British film by Albert Parker

- Opening titles
- Directed by: Albert Parker
- Written by: Ingram D'Abbes; Fenn Sherie; Anthony Richardson
- Produced by: Ernest Gartside
- Starring: James Mason; Virginia Cherrill; Alastair Sim
- Cinematography: Alex Bryce
- Edited by: Reginald Beck
- Music by: Charles Cowlrick
- Production company: Fox-British Pictures
- Distributed by: Fox Film Company
- Release date: 19 November 1935
- Running time: 69 minutes
- Country: United Kingdom
- Language: English

Late Extra is a 1935 British crime film directed by Albert Parker and starring James Mason (his film debut), Virginia Cherrill, and Alastair Sim. It was written by Ingram D'Abbes and Fenn Sherie and Anthony Richardson.

== Plot ==
Cub reporter Jim Martin gets his big break when he is assigned to interview a woman who rang his newspaper claiming to have information about wanted murderer Rudolf Weinhart. Jim and his reporter girlfriend Janet Graham arrive at the woman's apartment only to discover her dead. When Janet meets a girl named Sylvia Caporelli who claims to have inside information but demands anonymity, Jim and Janet quarrel, as they struggle to choose between their loyalty to the newspaper and their duty to protect an individual. Despite being repeatedly thwarted by information leaks within his own office, Jim persists, eventually tracking down Weinhart and getting his exclusive story.

== Cast ==
- James Mason as Jim Martin
- Virginia Cherrill as Janet Graham
- Alastair Sim as MacPherson
- Ian Colin as Ronnie Carson
- Clifford McLaglen as Rudolf Weinhart
- Cyril Chosack as Jules
- David Horne as Williams, newspaper editor
- Antoinette Cellier as Sylvia Caporelli
- Donald Wolfit as Inspector Greville
- Hannen Swaffer as himself
- Andreas Malandrinos as Caporelli
- Edie Martin as apartment resident
- Bernard Miles as Charlie
- Bill Shine as Fred
- Desmond Tester as copy boy
- Ralph Truman as minor role
- Michael Wilding as newspaper telephone operator

== Production ==
The film was made at Wembley Studios by the British subsidiary of the Fox Film Company as a quota quickie. The film's sets were designed by the art director Ralph W. Brinton.

== Reception ==
The Monthly Film Bulletin wrote: "The plot is improbable but exciting; the development provides suspense while the climax is spectacular and thrilling. ... The newspaper office sequences are convincing; lighting and photography are good and the direction is thoroughly competent. There is a pleasant element of romance which relieves the tension without holding up the action."

The Daily Film Renter wrote: "Put over with an overplus of dialogue, the story is not always convincing, while certain parts of the development are occasionally obscure. Romance enters into the general scheme in the person of a girl reporter who helps the hero on his assignment, later getting together with him at the fade-out for the conventional embrace. Newspaper office settings appear fairly authentic, and direction manages to sustain the interest, despite the plot weaknesses."

Picture Show wrote: "The story is somewhat vague and confused, and lacks conviction. James Mason in the role of Jim gives an aceeptable performance in which he is strongly supported by Virginia Cherrill."
