= Soběkury =

- Municipality
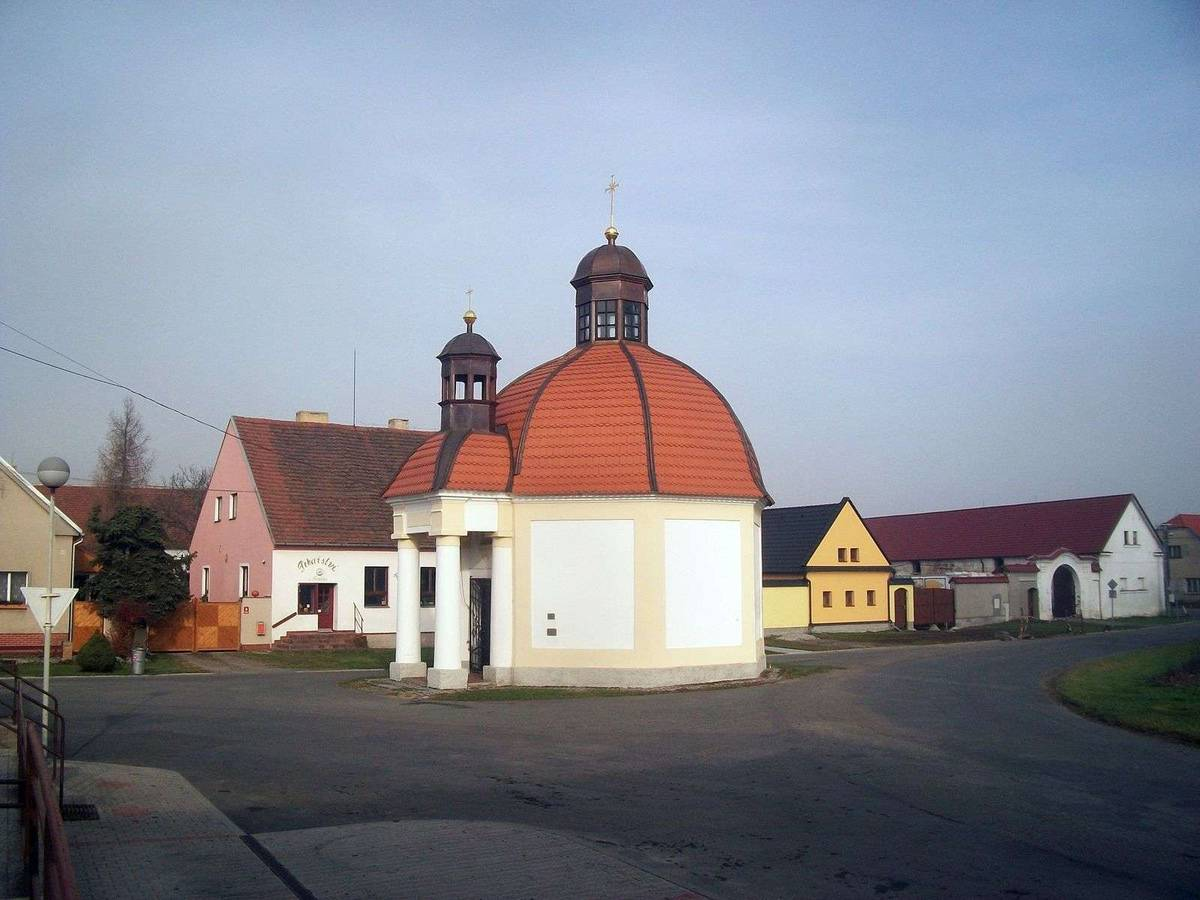
- Chapel of the Exaltation of the Holy Cross

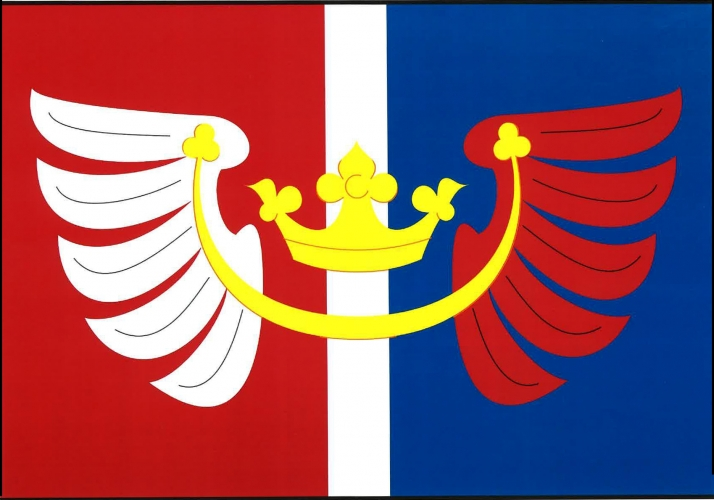
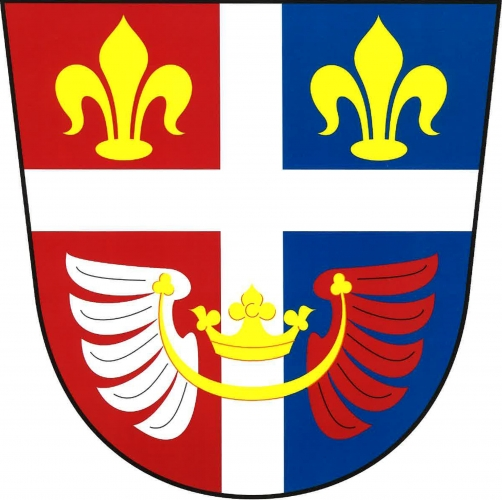
- Flag Coat of arms

- Location in the Czech Republic
- Coordinates: 49°34′35″N 13°14′21″E
- Country: Czech Republic
- Region: Plzeň
- District: Plzeň-South
- First mentioned: 1239

Area
  - Total: 11.85 km^{2} (4.58 sq mi)
- Elevation: 398 m (1,306 ft)

Population (2026-01-01)
  - Total: 630
  - Density: 53/km^{2} (140/sq mi)
- Time zone: UTC+1 (CET)
  - Summer (DST): UTC+2 (CEST)
- Postal code: 334 01
- Website: www.sobekury.cz

Soběkury (German: Sobichur) is a municipality and village in Plzeň-South District in the Plzeň Region of the Czech Republic. It has about 600 inhabitants.

== Administrative division ==
Soběkury consists of two municipal parts (in brackets population according to the 2021 census):

- Soběkury (380)
- Horušany (221)

== Geography ==
Soběkury is located about 20 kilometres (12 mi) southwest of Plzeň. It lies on the border between the Švihov Highlands and Plasy Uplands. The highest point is the hill Skočická mýť at 506 m (1,660 ft) above sea level. The stream Dnešický potok originates in the municipality and then flows through the Soběkury village.

== History ==
The first written mention of Soběkury is from 1239. The village of Horušany was first mentioned in 1379. During the Hussite Wars, Soběkury was badly damaged and Horušany was completely destroyed. Soběkury again suffered during the Thirty Years' War, but prosperity and economic development took place in the first half of the 18th century. At the end of the 18th century, Horušany was restored and resettled. From 1692 until the establishment of an independent municipality in 1850, the area was part of the Merklín estate and shared its owners.

== Demographics ==
Historical population

Year	Pop.	±%
1869	676	—
1880	679	+0.4%
1890	780	+14.9%
1900	802	+2.8%
1910	887	+10.6%

Year	Pop.	±%
1921	856	−3.5%
1930	839	−2.0%
1950	655	−21.9%
1961	659	+0.6%
1970	640	−2.9%

Year	Pop.	±%
1980	601	−6.1%
1991	606	+0.8%
2001	576	−5.0%
2011	605	+5.0%
2021	601	−0.7%

Source: Censuses

== Transport ==
There are no railways or major roads passing through the municipality.

== Sights ==
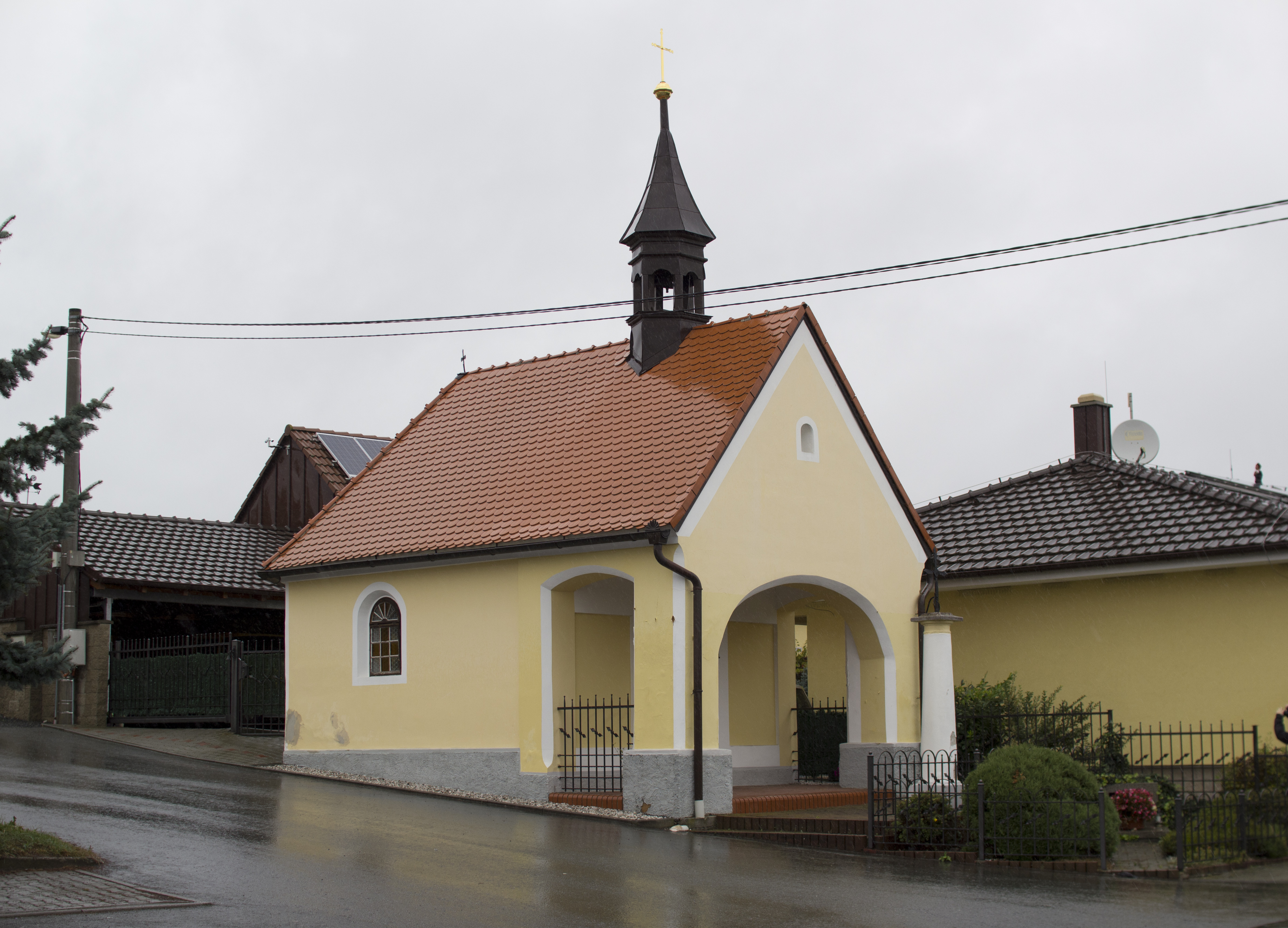
Chapel of the Virgin Mary

There are two chapels in the municipality. The Chapel of the Exaltation of the Holy Cross in the centre of Soběkury was built in 1829. The Chapel of the Virgin Mary in Horušany dates from the second half of the 19th century.

== Notable people ==
- Václav Robert Bozděch (1912–1980), air gunner
