= Antis (dog) =

Dog that received medal for bravery in WW2

- Species: Canis familiaris
- Breed: German Shepherd
- Sex: Male
- Born: c. 1939
- Died: 11 August 1953 (aged 13–14)
- Resting place: Ilford Animal Cemetery
- Nationality: France
- Notable role: Mascot, No. 311 (Czechoslovak) Squadron RAF
- Years active: 1940–1945
- Known for: Recipient of Dickin Medal for bravery
- Owner: Václav Robert Bozděch
- Appearance: Black streak down back

Antis (1939–1953), also known as Ant, was a dog who received the Dickin Medal in 1949 from the People's Dispensary for Sick Animals for bravery in service in England and North Africa during the Second World War.

== Discovery ==
During the winter of the Phoney War at the start of the Second World War, Václav Robert Bozděch and Pierre Duval were sent on a reconnaissance mission over the German front in their twin-seater Potez 630 aircraft from the French airbase at Saint-Dizier. It was hit by anti-aircraft fire and crashed in no-mans land between the French and German lines. Bozděch helped the injured Duval to an abandoned farm house nearby, wherein the Czech airman discovered a German Shepherd puppy on the floor in the kitchen. While the dog was not initially fond of Duval, it accepted Bozděch. Concerned that the puppy was emaciated, he began to feed it chocolate, but it would not eat it until the rations were partially melted. Bozděch also found an old frying pan, filled it with snow and melted it so that the dog could drink it.

The two airmen realised that they had to make for the French lines at night or risk capture by the Germans before morning. Bozděch left a pan of water and some more chocolate with the dog, and they locked it inside the farmhouse before heading off across the snow to a nearby wood. Almost immediately upon leaving the property, the night sky was lit up by flares fired by the Germans as they were looking for the aircrew from the nearby crash site. They had nearly reached the trees when they could hear the dog howling from the farmhouse. They agreed that the only course of action was for Bozděch to return and kill the dog. He left Duval in the snow, and went back to the house. As he approached he searched for a large rock or heavy object with which to kill the puppy in the most humane manner he could. The dog began to throw itself at the locked door as it heard someone approaching. Bozděch opened the door and found he could not kill the animal, instead picking it up and placing it next to his chest inside his flight jacket. The trio made it into the cover of the trees, and were discovered by a party of French troops who had been sent to look for them. They took the dog back to the base with them, where Duval was sent to the hospital. Bozděch met back up with his fellow Czech airmen in exile, who all played with the puppy. It was decided to name him Ant, after their favourite aircraft from back in Czechoslovakia.

== Military service ==
=== French Air Force ===
A diagram of a Potez 630, the type of plane in which Antis took his first flight

Ant saw little action during the remainder of the Phoney War, but adopted Bozděch as his master, sleeping at the foot of his bed in barracks. With the end of the Phoney War on 10 May 1940, the airfield at Saint-Dizier was bombed by a wing of German Dornier Do 17s, while Bozděch and Ant were huddled in a bunker. The attack destroyed all but fourteen of the planes at the base, and following this the local forces began their retreat. After moving to their third base, Bozděch took the decision to take Ant with him in the Potez 630 for the dog's first combat mission. Ant barely stirred, even when Bozděch was firing the guns at German fighters. The duo were reunited with a recovered Duval, who became Bozděch's pilot once again, while Ant continued to fly with them.

During the latter part of the Battle of France on 14 June, a flight of Messerschmitt Bf 110s destroyed the remaining planes of Bozděch's squadron while they were on the ground. Three days later, the squadron was informed by their adjutant that they were disbanding. Ant and the Czech airmen made for Tours, some 25 miles (40 km) to the south, where the nearest railway station was located to travel south to Spain and then Gibraltar, from where they could fight on from the United Kingdom. They were concerned how they might make their way at speed to Tours, but on leaving the village they discovered a party underway at a nearby house, celebrating the German invasion. The group proceeded to steal a trap from the house after subduing a guard using Ant as a distraction. They stacked their possessions on the trap, with Ant sat on top. The men took turns pulling the trap, heading instead to Blois, with the remainder pushing from behind. They joined the columns of refugees on the roads heading south. However, Ant kept getting unbalanced and falling off the cart, delaying their journey and causing one of the party to suggest that they should kill the dog.

Bozděch elected instead to carry the dog and, after a while, they began to take turns carrying Ant over their shoulders. They reached Blois and were directed to a train to Montpellier further down the track where they found it overwhelmed with people trying to board. Ant shot off towards the rear of the train, before stopping by a cattle truck. Bozděch tried to open it up, but it was locked. He banged on it in the hope someone was already inside and was surprised when it was opened, revealing that the only people inside were a woman and her two daughters. The reason why Ant had been attracted to that particular carriage, was because one of the girls had been eating chocolate at the time. When she later offered him a piece, he didn't wait for it to be melted like when he was a puppy, but instead ate it excitedly.

The overloaded train made slow progress, moving only 60 miles (97 km) in three days. They found feeding the dog difficult with a lack of food in the carriage. The Czechs jumped off at one stop to attempt to milk a cow in a nearby pasture to fill a baby's bottle for the dog, but they led some locals to believe they were seeking food for a baby, and so they were supplied with milk. This was repeated a further few times on the journey, each time they produced the bottle they would be given milk for the non-existent baby. From Montpellier, they changed trains to travel to Marseille where they boarded a boat to Gibraltar, where they arrived on 30 June.

=== Flight from Gibraltar ===
The trip to Gibraltar was uneventful, and once they arrived they sought to board MV Northmoor which was due to join a convoy for England. The ferry to the cargo vessel refused to allow any dogs on board, with one of the guards claiming that they had refused a Colonel's dog earlier that day. Bozděch instead elected to trust Ant's recall ability; the airman boarded the ferry and left Antis on the shore. He went on board Northmoor before taking a ladder down the outside of the hull to a swimming platform where he called out for Ant. The dog swam across the 100 yards (91 m) to the ship, where Bozděch wrapped Ant in his greatcoat before being smuggled into Northmoor's hold.

The duo spent most of the journey on Northmoor in the hold, where their Czech compatriots had created a sleeping area for them. The rest of the refugees spent their time on deck. However, Bozděch was concerned about their likelihood of survival in the event of a U-boat attack. The first attack came two days after the convoy left Gibraltar, resulting in the companying destroyers spreading out and dropping depth charges. The attack seemed to subside after a few hours, with man and dog staying below decks the whole time because of the risk of Ant's discovery if they went above decks. The submarine attack was followed up by a group of Junkers Ju 88s, when instead of remaining below decks, Bozděch took Ant up onto the upper deck; they were not discovered in the chaos. Northmoor was indirectly damaged by the action, as it developed an engine fault after steaming too fast and too long.

The refugees were transferred to the cruise ship Neuralia, which had been taken into war service. The Czechs looked to smuggle Ant between the two ships by hiding him in a kit bag. This failed as the dog pushed his head out of the bag just as they were boarding – fortunately for Ant the new crew seemed happy to have a dog on-board and welcomed him. The facilities on Neuralia were much better than Northmoor, as the cabins remained fitted out as a cruise ship and Ant could stay in the cabin with the men. The remainder of the voyage went smoothly, until Bozděch was informed about the quarantine rules for dogs upon entering the United Kingdom. Having no money with which to pay for the quarantine fees, the Czechs sought once again to smuggle him – this time into the UK. They elected to hide Ant once again in a bag, this time mixed up in those being transferred as cargo by crane. They arrived at the docks in Liverpool on 12 July, where they successfully took Ant ashore. They were nearly found out by a pair of military police as they were at the train station nearby as they were on their way to Cholmondeley, Cheshire.

== Life ==
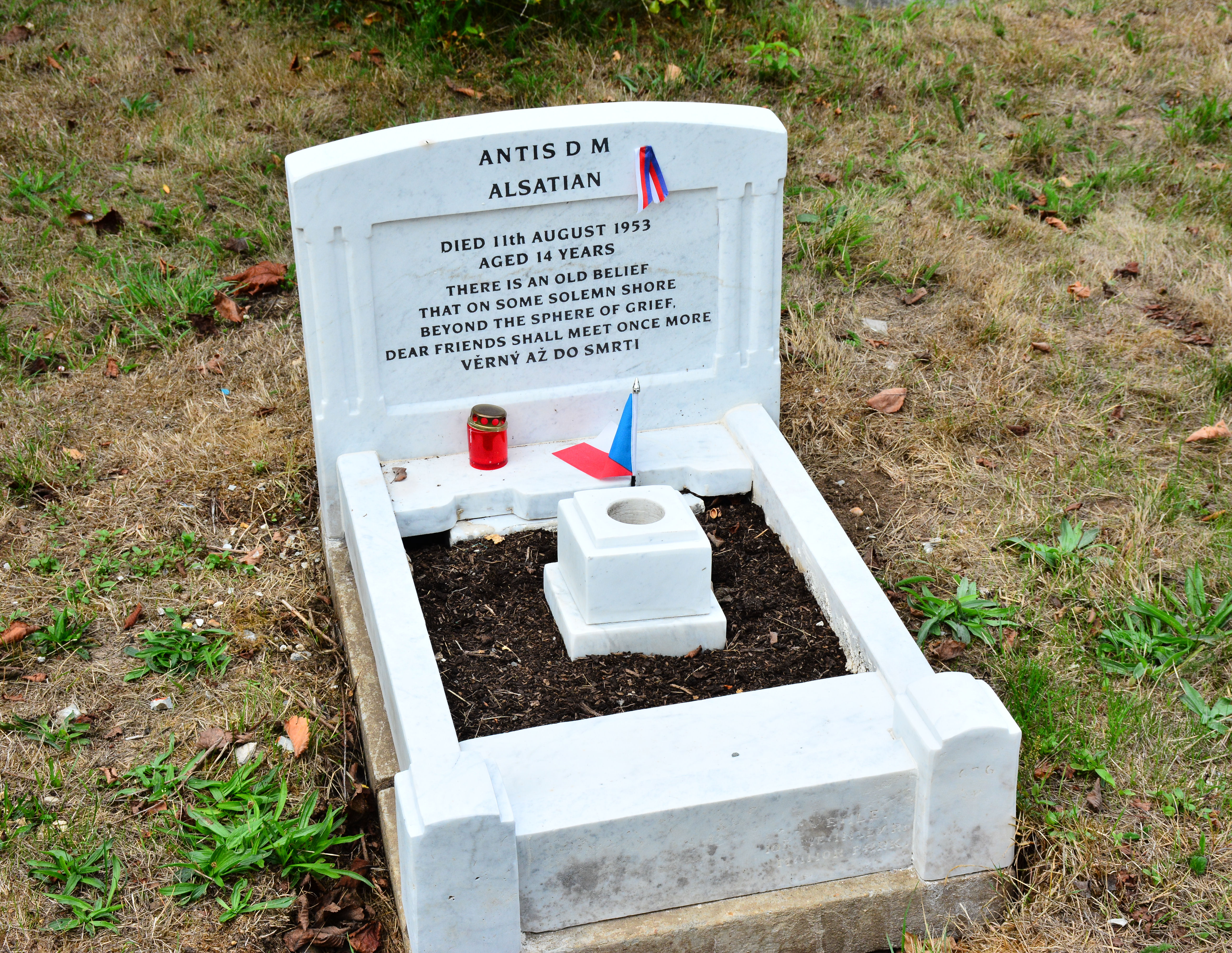

When France surrendered to Germany, Bozděch and Antis moved to England to join No. 311 (Czechoslovak) Squadron RAF, based first at Speke, Liverpool, where Antis assisted in searching for survivors after an air raid. A few months later, 311 Squadron was posted to RAF East Wretham in Norfolk and, despite regulations prohibiting Antis flying with Bozděch, he took part in around 30 missions. He became a mascot for the squadron as well as a personal pet, but stayed with Bozděch when he returned to his native Czechoslovakia after the war. When Bozděch had to flee Czechoslovakia again in 1948 from the growing persecution of army personnel who served on the side of western allies by the communists who recently gained power after the 1948 Czechoslovak coup d'état, Antis helped him escape, guiding him and several others around searchlights and the field of fire of a fixed machine gun position, and allowing them to cross safely into West Germany.

Antis was formally recognised for his heroics in 1949, when he was awarded the Dickin Medal, which is frequently referred to as "the animal's Victoria Cross". Václav Bozděch became a British national two years later, in 1951, and Antis lived with him until he died around the age of 13–14.

== Legacy ==
The first book to be written about Antis was Anthony Richardson's One Man and His Dog (1961), although several changes were made to his story such as Bozděch's first name becoming Jan. The airman had worked on the book with Richardson, and was dissatisfied with the result. There was talk at the time of the book being picked up as a film by 20th Century Fox, but it was never made.

== See also ==
- List of individual dogs
