= Václav Robert Bozděch =

- Born: 15 July 1912; Soběkury, Austria-Hungary
- Died: 27 February 1980 (aged 67); Devon, United Kingdom
- Military career
- Allegiance: Czechoslovakia
- Branch: Czechoslovak Air Force; French Air Force; Royal Air Force
- Service years: 1935– ?
- Rank: Colonel (posthumous)
- Conflicts: World War II: Battle of France; Battle of Britain
- Other work: Author

Colonel Václav Robert Bozděch (15 July 1912 in Soběkury– 27 February 1980 in Devon) was a Czech air gunner of World War II. He was a British Royal Air Force (RAF) squadron gunner and commander of training centers.

== Early life ==
Bozděch was trained as a locksmith. Before the war he became a soldier and a trained air gunner.

== World War II ==
He arrived in Great Britain via Poland and France, where he briefly served in the French Air Force. In the UK, he first served as an air gunner with No. 311 Squadron RAF. After having flown his first tour he became an instructor and commander of the training centres.

Bozdech was accompanied through the war by a German Shepherd dog, which he found as a puppy after a crash landing while in the French Air Force. He and his fellow Czech airmen named the dog Antis, after the Soviet ANT-40 bomber. Their story was later told in at least three books. (see Dogs in warfare)

== After World War II ==
After the war he returned to Czechoslovakia and worked at the Ministry of Defence. He married and had a son. He also wrote and published books – Gentlemen of Dusk and Duel with Destiny. After the 1948 Czechoslovak coup d'état he went into exile a second time and returned to the UK, where he rejoined the RAF and married again. He never returned to his homeland. In the context of rehabilitation, after 1989 he was posthumously promoted to the rank of colonel.

== References and further reading ==
- Velinger, Jan (18 March 2009). "The story of a Czech WW II airman and his remarkable dog". Radio Prague.
