= Anthony Richardson (writer) =

English writer (1899–1964)

- Born: 1899; London, England, U.K.
- Died: 4 February 1964 (aged 64–65)
- Education: Marlborough College
- Occupations: Fiction and non-fiction writer
- Writing career
- Period: 20th century
- Genre: Adventure
- Subject: Biography

Anthony Thomas Stewart Currie Richardson (1899 – 4 February 1964) was an English writer of adventure fiction and non-fiction books.

== Biography ==
Richardson was born in 1899 in the Kensington district of London and educated at Marlborough College. In 1940, he was commissioned in the Royal Air Force Volunteer Reserve (Administrative and Special Duties Branch).

Richardson's most well-known work is probably Wingless Victory: The Story of Sir Basil Embry's Escape from Occupied France in the Summer of 1940.

Richardson also wrote under the pseudonym Patrick Wynnton.

== Bibliography ==
- Word of the Earth. Conversations Between Fictitious Characters (1923)
- Ransom (1925)
- High Silver (1926)
- The Barbury Witch (1927)
- The Transgressor (1928)
- Milord and I (1930)
- City of the Rose (1933)
- Golden Empire (1938)
- Because of These: Verses of the Royal Air Force (1942)
- These – Our Children (1943)
- Full Cycle: Verses of the Royal Air Force (1946)
- Wingless Victory with Sir Basil Edward Embry (1950) [US ed.: Alone He Went (1951)]
- The Rose of Kantara (1951)
- The Crowded Hours: The Story of 'Sos' Cohen (1952)
- I Was a Pirate (1959)
- Crash Kavanagh: A Biography of Reg Kavanagh with Reg Kavanagh (1953)
- Nick of the River: The Story of Detective Inspector David Herbert Cyril Nixon with David Herbert Cyril Nixon (1955)
- No Place to Lay My Head. An Account of the Experiences of a Belarusian in the German Army during the Second World War (1957)
- Never Say Die: A Return to Everyday Living for the Partly Disabled (1959)
- One Man and His Dog (1962) – about a German Shepherd puppy, Antis, rescued from World War Two no man's land in France by Czech fighter pilot Robert Bozdech and their lives together
- Nick of Notting Hill: The Bearded Policeman. The Story of Police Constable J. Nixon of the Metropolitan Police with Joe Nixon (1965)

As Patrick Wynnton:

- The Black Turret (1925)
- The Third Messenger (1926)
- The Lady Zia (1928)
- The Lost Mark (1929)
- The Honourable Pursuit (1930)
- The Ten Jewels (1931)
- The Agent Outside (1931)

Short stories

Published in The Thriller:

- "Mystery of the Arches" (1933)
- "Hells' Gamble" (1933
- "Crooks Cove" (1934)
- "The Grand Duke's Seal" (1934)
- "Guardian of the Idol's Eye" (1935)

Published in Short Stories:

- "The Net – Parts 1–4" (1933)

== Sources ==
- Royal Air Force (Volunteer Reserve)
- The FictionMags Index
