= Lucha Libre World Cup (2023) =

Professional Mexican wrestling event

- Promotion poster featuring the participants of the tournament
- Promotion: Lucha Libre AAA Worldwide
- Date: March 19, 2023
- City: Zapopan, Jalisco, Mexico
- Venue: Estadio de Béisbol Charros de Jalisco

Event chronology
← Previous; The World is a Vampire	Next → Triplemanía XXXI

Lucha Libre World Cup chronology
← Previous; 2017	Next → —

The Lucha Libre World Cup was a professional wrestling event and tournament organized by Mexican professional wrestling promotion Lucha Libre AAA Worldwide (AAA). The tournament took place on March 19, 2023 at Estadio de Béisbol Charros de Jalisco in Zapopan, near Guadalajara, Mexico. The 2023 edition of the tournament featured three-person teams, referred to as trios in Lucha Libre; this differed from the previous edition of the event which featured traditional two-person tag teams.

The tournament showcased teams with wrestlers from numerous international promotions including Mexico's Nación Lucha Libre (NLL), America's All Elite Wrestling (AEW), Impact Wrestling (Impact), and the National Wrestling Alliance (NWA), Japan's Dragon Gate and Oz Academy (Oz), and Qatar Pro Wrestling (QPW). The men's tournament was won by Team Mexico (Taurus, Pentagón Jr., and Laredo Kid) and the women's tournament was won by Team United States (Deonna Purrazzo, Kamille, and Jordynne Grace).

== Background ==
The Mexican lucha libre promotion AAA, with the financial support of the Mexican brewing company Grupo Modelo organized the first ever Lucha Libre World Cup in the summer of 2015. The tournament itself was a one-night eight-team tournament for trios, or tag teams of three wrestlers. AAA reached out to several promotions both in Mexico and around the world and arranged for six of the eight teams to come from outside AAA. Japanese wrestling promotions All Japan Pro Wrestling (AJPW) and Pro Wrestling Noah both sent teams. Both Total Nonstop Action Wrestling (TNA) and Ring of Honor (ROH), based in the United States, also sent representatives to the tournament, in each case bolstered by representatives of Lucha Underground, an AAA joint-venture project based on Los Angeles. The tournament took place on May 25, 2015, and had the AAA labelled "Dream Team" of Rey Mysterio Jr., El Patrón Alberto and Myzteziz win the tournament, defeating Team TNA/Lucha Underground (Matt Hardy, Mr. Anderson and Johnny Mundo) in the finals. A second World Cup was held in the summer of 2016. The second edition featured two tournaments, one for male wrestlers and another for female wrestlers. The men's tournament was won by Brian Cage, Chavo Guerrero Jr., and Johnny Mundo of Team Lucha Underground while the women's tournament was won by Faby Apache, Lady Apache, and Mari Apache of Team Mexico. The 2017 tournament was won by Team Mexico AAA (Pagano and Psycho Clown).

The 2023 edition, the first since 2017, was officially announced on January 17 during a press conference.

== Teams ==
Men's
Team	Members	
Team	Name	Promotion
Dream Team	(Mexico) Alberto El Patrón	NLL
Dream Team	(Mexico) Hijo del Vikingo	AAA
Dream Team	(Mexico) Psycho Clown	AAA
Team Mexico	(Mexico) Taurus	AAA
Team Mexico	(Mexico) Pentagón Jr.	AAA
Team Mexico	(Mexico) Laredo Kid	AAA
Team United States	(United States) Johnny Caballero	Independent
Team United States	(United States) Sam Adonis	AAA
Team United States	(United States) Christopher Daniels	AEW
Team Canada	(Canada) Vampiro	AAA
Team Canada	(Canada) Josh Alexander	Impact
Team Canada	(Canada) PCO	Impact
Team Latin America	(Puerto Rico) Carlito	NLL
Team Latin America	(Brazil) Zumbi	Independent
Team Latin America	(Argentina) Hip Hop Man	Independent
Team Japan	(Japan) Takuma Nishikawa	Dragon Gate
Team Japan	(Japan) La Estrella	Dragon Gate
Team Japan	(Japan) Kuukai	Independent
Team Europe	(England) Thom Latimer	NWA
Team Europe	(France) Heddi Karaoui	Independent
Team Europe	(Scotland) Joe Hendry	Impact
Team Rest of the World	(Qatar) Rage	QPW
Team Rest of the World	(Qatar) Classy Ali	QPW
Team Rest of the World	(India) Bhupinder Gujjar	Impact

Women's
Team	Members	
Team	Name	Promotion
Team Mexico	(Mexico) Sexy Star II	AAA
Team Mexico	(Mexico) Flammer	AAA
Team Mexico	(Mexico) La Hiedra	AAA
Team United States	(United States) Kamille	NWA
Team United States	(United States) Deonna Purrazzo	Impact
Team United States	(United States) Jordynne Grace	Impact
Team Japan	(Japan) Emi Sakura	AEW
Team Japan	(Japan) Mayumi Ozaki	Oz
Team Japan	(Japan) Akino	Oz
Team Rest of the World	(Canada) Taya Valkyrie	Impact
Team Rest of the World	(Panama) Dalys (Note: Christi Jaynes, who represented the NWA and Brazil, was originally announced for Team Rest of the World, but was pulled from the tournament due to a visa issue. Dalys replaced her.)	AAA
Team Rest of the World	(Russia) Natalia Markova	NWA

== Results ==
No.	Results	Stipulations	Times
1	Dream Team (Psycho Clown, Alberto El Patrón, and Hijo del Vikingo) vs. Team Latin America (Carlito, Hip Hop Man, and Zumbi) ended in a draw	Trios match 2023 Lucha Libre World Cup men's tournament first round	10:00
2	Alberto El Patrón (Dream Team) defeated Carlito (Team Latin America)	Singles match 2023 Lucha Libre World Cup men's tournament first round sudden death match	3:54
3	Team United States (Sam Adonis, Johnny Caballero, and Christopher Daniels) defeated Team Japan (La Estrella, Takuma Nishikawa, and Kuukai)	Trios match 2023 Lucha Libre World Cup men's tournament first round	8:22
4	Team Mexico (Taurus, Pentagón Jr., and Laredo Kid) defeated Team Rest of the World (Classy Ali, Rage, and Bhupinder Gujjar)	Trios match 2023 Lucha Libre World Cup men's tournament first round	7:06
5	Team Europe (Joe Hendry, Heddi Karaoui, and Thom Latimer) defeated Team Canada (Josh Alexander, Vampiro, and PCO)	Trios match 2023 Lucha Libre World Cup men's tournament first round	8:51
6	Team United States (Deonna Purrazzo, Kamille, and Jordynne Grace) defeated Team Rest of the World (Dalys, Taya Valkyrie, and Natalia Markova)	Trios match 2023 Lucha Libre World Cup women's tournament first round	9:11
7	Team Mexico (Sexy Star II, Flammer, La Hiedra) vs. Team Japan (Emi Sakura, Mayumi Ozaki, and Akino) ended in a draw	Trios match 2023 Lucha Libre World Cup women's tournament first round	10:00
8	La Hiedra (Team Mexico) defeated Akino (Team Japan)	Singles match 2023 Lucha Libre World Cup women's tournament first round sudden death match	3:40
9	Team United States (Sam Adonis, Johnny Caballero, and Christopher Daniels) vs. Dream Team (Psycho Clown, Alberto El Patrón, and Hijo del Vikingo) ended in a draw	Trios match 2023 Lucha Libre World Cup men's tournament semi-final	10:00
10	Sam Adonis (Team United States) defeated Psycho Clown (Dream Team)	Singles match 2023 Lucha Libre World Cup men's tournament semi-final sudden death match	2:30
11	Team Mexico (Taurus, Pentagón Jr., and Laredo Kid) defeated Team Europe (Joe Hendry, Heddi Karaoui, and Thom Latimer)	Trios match 2023 Lucha Libre World Cup men's tournament semi-final	7:22
12	Team United States (Deonna Purrazzo, Kamille, and Jordynne Grace) defeated Team Mexico (Sexy Star II, Flammer, La Hiedra)	Trios match 2023 Lucha Libre World Cup women's tournament final	5:13
13	Team Mexico (Taurus, Pentagón Jr., and Laredo Kid) vs. Team United States (Sam Adonis, Johnny Caballero, and Christopher Daniels) ended in a draw	Trios match 2023 Lucha Libre World Cup men's tournament final	10:00
14	Pentagón Jr. (Team Mexico) vs. Johnny Caballero (Team United States) ended in a draw	Singles match 2023 Lucha Libre World Cup men's tournament final sudden death match	5:00
15	Pentagón Jr. (Team Mexico) vs. Johnny Caballero (Team United States) ended in a draw	Singles match 2023 Lucha Libre World Cup men's tournament final sudden death match	5:00
16	Pentagón Jr. (Team Mexico) defeated Johnny Caballero (Team United States)	Singles match 2023 Lucha Libre World Cup men's tournament final sudden death match	4:28

== Tournament brackets ==
Men's

1st Round
Dream Team	Win
Team Latin America
Team Japan
Team United States	Win
Team Mexico	Win
Team Rest of the World
Team Canada
Team Europe	Win

Semifinals
Dream Team
Team United States	Win
Team Mexico	Win
Team Europe

Final
Team United States
Team Mexico	Win

Women's

1st Round
Team Japan
Team Mexico	Win
Team Rest of the World
Team United States	Win

Final
Team Mexico
Team United States	Win

== See also ==
- 2023 in professional wrestling
