= Lucha Libre World Cup (2017) =

Professional Mexican wrestling event

- Promotional poster featuring Mil Muertes, Psycho Clown, Sexy Star, Vampiro, Drago, and King Cuerno
- Promotion(s): Lucha Libre AAA Worldwide; Lucha Underground
- Date: October 9, 2017; October 10, 2017
- City: Tokyo, Japan
- Venue: Shin-Kiba 1st Ring (October 9); Korakuen Hall (October 10)

Event chronology
← Previous; Héroes Inmortales XI	Next → Guerra de Titanes

Lucha Libre World Cup chronology
← Previous; 2016	Next → 2023

The Lucha Libre World Cup was a two-day professional wrestling event and tournament organized by Mexican professional wrestling promotion Lucha Libre AAA Worldwide (AAA) with the financial backing of the Grupo Modelo brewery, with Victoria Beer as the official sponsor. The tournament took place on October 9 and October 10 in Tokyo's Shin-Kiba 1st Ring and Korakuen Hall venues, marking the first time the tournament has been held outside AAA's home country of Mexico. The 2017 edition of the tournament also marked the first to feature traditional two-man tag teams, as the previous tournaments had featured a number of three-man tag teams, referred to as trios in Lucha Libre. The tournament showcased teams representing numerous international promotions such as the Inoki Genome Federation (IGF), Impact Wrestling, and Pro Wrestling Noah among others.

== Background ==
The Mexican lucha libre promotion AAA, with the financial support of the Mexican brewing company Grupo Modelo organized the first ever Lucha Libre World Cup in the summer of 2015. The tournament itself was a one-night eight-team tournament for trios, or tag teams of three wrestlers. AAA reached out to several promotions both in Mexico and around the world and arranged for six of the eight teams to come from outside AAA. Japanese wrestling promotions All Japan Pro Wrestling (AJPW) and Pro Wrestling Noah both sent teams. Both Total Nonstop Action Wrestling (TNA) and Ring of Honor (ROH), based in the United States, also sent representatives to the tournament, in each case bolstered by representatives of Lucha Underground, an AAA joint-venture project based on Los Angeles. The tournament took place on May 25, 2015, and had the AAA labelled "Dream Team" of Rey Mysterio Jr., El Patrón Alberto and Myzteziz win the tournament, defeating Team TNA/Lucha Underground (Matt Hardy, Mr. Anderson and Johnny Mundo) in the finals. A second World Cup was held in the summer of 2016. The second edition featured two tournaments, one for male wrestlers and another for female wrestlers. The men's tournament was won by Brian Cage, Chavo Guerrero Jr., and Johnny Mundo of Team Lucha Underground while the women's tournament was won by Faby Apache, Lady Apache, and Mari Apache of Team Mexico.

AAA officially announced the 2017 tournament and the participating teams on September 29.

== Teams ==
Team	Team member
Team Japan IGF	Kendo Kashin
Team Japan IGF	Nosawa
Team Japan Noah	Hi69
Team Japan Noah	Taiji Ishimori
Team Mexico AAA	Pagano
Team Mexico AAA	Psycho Clown
Team Mexico Lucha Underground	Aero Star
Team Mexico Lucha Underground	Drago
Team Rest of the World	Mil Muertes
Team Rest of the World	Vampiro
Team USA Impact	Andrew Everett
Team USA Impact	DJZ
Team USA Lucha Underground	Marty Martinez
Team USA Lucha Underground	Son of Havoc
Team USA Noah	Cody Hall
Team USA Noah	Quiet Storm

== Results ==
=== October 9 ===
No.	Results	Stipulations
1	Aero Star defeated Marty Martinez	Singles match
2	Angélico and Son of Havoc defeated Masamune and Taiji Ishimori	Tag team match
3	Team Mexico AAA (Pagano and Psycho Clown) defeated Tokyo Gurentai (Minoru Fujita and Nosawa)	Tag team match
4	King Cuerno defeated Drago	Singles match
5	Mil Muertes vs. Vampiro ended in a no contest	Singles match

=== October 10 ===
No.	Results	Stipulations	Times
1	Team Mexico AAA (Pagano and Psycho Clown) defeated Team USA Noah (Cody Hall and Quiet Storm)	Tag team match Lucha Libre World Cup quarter final	9:08
2	Team Japan IGF (Kendo Kashin and Nosawa) defeated Team Rest of the World (Mil Muertes and Vampiro)	Tag team match Lucha Libre World Cup quarter final	6:09
3	Team Japan Noah (Hi69 and Taiji Ishimori) defeated Team USA Lucha Underground (Marty Martinez and Son of Havoc)	Tag team match Lucha Libre World Cup quarter final	8:11
4	Team USA Impact (Andrew Everett and DJZ) defeated Team Mexico Lucha Underground (Aero Star and Drago)	Tag team match Lucha Libre World Cup quarter final	7:51
5	Heidi Katrina, Recca, and Taylor Adams defeated Danny Jones, Diego, and Sumire Natsu	International trios match	13:42
6	Team Mexico AAA (Pagano and Psycho Clown) defeated Team Japan IGF (Kendo Kashin and Nosawa)	Tag team match Lucha Libre World Cup semi final	5:14
7	Team Japan Noah (Hi69 and Taiji Ishimori) vs. Team USA Impact (Andrew Everett and DJZ) ended in a draw	Tag team match Lucha Libre World Cup semi final	10:00
8	Taiji Ishimori defeated DJZ	Singles match Lucha Libre World Cup semi final sudden death match	2:11
9	King Cuerno defeated Angélico	Singles match	11:08
10	Team Mexico AAA (Pagano and Psycho Clown) defeated Team Japan Noah (Hi69 and Taiji Ishimori)	Tag team match Lucha Libre World Cup finals	6:38

=== Tournament bracket ===
1st Round
Team Japan IGF (Kendo Kashin and Nosawa)	Disqualification
Team Rest of the World (Mil Muertes and Vampiro)	—
Team Mexico AAA (Pagano and Psycho Clown)	Pinfall
Team USA Noah (Cody Hall and Quiet Storm)	—
Team Japan Noah (Hi69 and Taiji Ishimori)	Pinfall
Team USA Lucha Underground (Marty Martinez and Son of Havoc)	—
Team Mexico Lucha Underground (Aero Star and Drago)	—
Team USA Impact (Andrew Everett and DJZ)	Pinfall

Semifinals
Team Japan IGF	—
Team Mexico AAA	Pinfall
Team Japan Noah	Pinfall
Team USA Impact	—

Final
Team Mexico AAA	Pinfall
Team Japan Noah	—

== See also ==
- 2017 in professional wrestling
