= Lucha Libre World Cup =

Lucha Libre AAA World Wide tournament

The Lucha Libre World Cup was an annual professional wrestling tournament and event organized by Mexican professional wrestling promotion Lucha Libre AAA Worldwide (AAA). The first two tournaments, which featured three-man tag teams, referred to as trios in lucha libre, were held in Mexico City, while the third tournament, which featured traditional two-man tag teams, was held in Tokyo, Japan.

== Tournaments ==
#	Year	Division	Winners	Date(s)	Location	Ref(s)
1	2015	—N/a	Dream Team (El Patrón Alberto, Myzteziz, and Rey Mysterio Jr.)	May 24, 2015	Mexico City, Mexico	
2	2016	Men	Team Lucha Underground (Brian Cage, Chavo Guerrero Jr. and Johnny Mundo)	June 3, 2016; June 5, 2016	Mexico City, Mexico	
3	2016	Women	Team Mexico (Faby Apache, Mari Apache, and Lady Apache)	June 3, 2016; June 5, 2016	Mexico City, Mexico	
4	2017	—N/a	Team Mexico AAA (Pagano and Psycho Clown)	October 9, 2017; October 10, 2017	Tokyo, Japan	
5	2023	Men	Team Mexico (Taurus, Pentagón Jr., and Laredo Kid)	March 19, 2023	Zapopan, Jalisco, Mexico	
6	2023	Women	Team United States (Deonna Purrazzo, Kamille, and Jordynne Grace)	March 19, 2023	Zapopan, Jalisco, Mexico	
