= Lucha Libre World Cup (2016) =

Professional Mexican wrestling event

- Official poster for the tournament
- Promotion: Lucha Libre AAA Worldwide
- Date: June 3, 2016; June 5, 2016
- City: Mexico City, Mexico
- Venue: Palacio de los Deportes

Event chronology
← Previous; Rey de Reyes	Next → Triplemanía XXIV

Lucha Libre World Cup chronology
← Previous; 2015	Next → 2017

The Lucha Libre World Cup was a two-day professional wrestling event and tournament organized by Mexican professional wrestling promotion Lucha Libre AAA Worldwide (AAA) with the financial backing of the Grupo Modelo brewery, with Victoria Beer as the official sponsor. The tournament included a number of three-man tag teams, referred to as trios in Lucha Libre, teams and wrestling promotions already announced are AAA, Total Nonstop Action Wrestling (TNA), Lucha Underground and Pro Wrestling Noah among others. The tournament was announced as "Lucha Libre Victoria World Cup".

== Production ==
=== Background ===
The Mexican lucha libre promotion Lucha Libre AAA Worldwide (AAA), with the financial support of the Mexican brewing company Grupo Modelo organized the first ever Lucha Libre World Cup over the summer of 2015. The tournament itself was a one-night eight-team tournament for trios, or tag teams of three wrestlers. AAA reached out to several promotions both in Mexico and around the world and arranged for six of the eight teams to come from outside of AAA. Japanese wrestling promotions All Japan Pro Wrestling (AJPW) and Pro Wrestling Noah. Both Total Nonstop Action and Ring of Honor, based in the United States, also sent representatives to the tournament, in each case bolstered by representatives of Lucha Underground, an AAA joint-venture project based on Los Angeles. The tournament took place on May 25, 2015, and had the AAA labelled "Dream Team" of Rey Mysterio Jr., El Patrón Alberto and Myzteziz win the tournament, defeating Team TNA/Lucha Underground (Matt Hardy, Mr. Anderson and Johnny Mundo) in the finals.

=== Storylines ===
The event featured various professional wrestling matches with different wrestlers involved in pre-existing scripted feuds, plots and storylines. Wrestlers were portrayed as either heels (referred to as rudos in Mexico, those that portray the "bad guys") or faces (técnicos in Mexico, the "good guy" characters) as they followed a series of tension-building events, which culminated in a wrestling match or series of matches.

Wrestlers and promotions from around the world, Pro Wrestling Noah, Total Nonstop Action Wrestling (TNA), Lucha Underground, Pro Wrestling Wave and Oz Academy, were announced as being involved. The inclusion of Wave and Oz Academy meant that female wrestlers were going to be included too as they are all-female wrestling promotions. On April 22, 2016, AAA made their first official press release confirming the 2016 version of the Lucha Libre World Cup. The statement confirmed that there would be two qualifying matches for the Cup during the April 29 show in Xalapa, Veracruz, but did not reveal a date for the tournament nor any other participants. The first qualifier was a three-way match between Perros del Mal ("The Bad Dogs") teammates Joe Líder, Daga and Pentagón Jr., with the winner becoming part of a team representing AAA. The other qualifier was announced as current AAA Mega Champion El Texano Jr. wrestling against Taurus and Garza Jr. Of all the announced participants only Texano Jr. had participated in the previous year's Lucha Libre World Cup. The third qualifying match for Team AAA took place during the May 14 show in Orizaba, Veracruz and it was originally a three-way match between Nicho el Millonario, Ricky Marvin and El Hijo del Pirata Morgan but later due to a request from Psycho Clown he was added to the match and eventually won.

== Tournament rules ==
AAA vice president Dorian Roldán explained the rules in a video uploaded to AAA's official YouTube channel last year. The tournament would consist of trios matches structured in quarterfinals, semi-finals and a final, plus an extra match to determine the third place. The bouts are slated to have a 15-minute time limit. If the time limit is reached without a clear winner, each of the participating teams selects one member, and the two picked wrestlers face off in a 5-minute sudden death in which the winning wrestler gets the victory for his team. There will be as many sudden deaths as necessary to determine a victor.

== Teams ==
Men's Division
Team	Team member	Ref.
Team AAA	Pentagón Jr.	
Team AAA	El Texano Jr.	
Team AAA	Psycho Clown	
Team Noah	Taiji Ishimori	
Team Noah	Naomichi Marufuji	
Team Noah	Maybach Taniguchi	
Team Ōdō and Zero1	Masato Tanaka	
Team Ōdō and Zero1	Akebono	
Team Ōdō and Zero1	Ikuto Hidaka	
Team Mexico Leyendas	Canek	
Team Mexico Leyendas	La Parka	
Team Mexico Leyendas	Blue Demon Jr.	
Team Mexico International	Rey Mysterio Jr	
Team Mexico International	Dr. Wagner Jr.	
Team Mexico International	Dragon Azteca Jr	
Team TNA	EC3	
Team TNA	Eli Drake	
Team TNA	Tyrus	
Team Lucha Underground	Chavo Guerrero Jr.	
Team Lucha Underground	Johnny Mundo	
Team Lucha Underground	Brian Cage	
Team Resto del Mundo	Mil Muertes	
Team Resto del Mundo	Rockstar Spud	
Team Resto del Mundo	Apolo	

Women's Division
Team	Team Member	Ref.
Team Mexico	Faby Apache	
Team Mexico	Mari Apache	
Team Mexico	Lady Apache	
Team Japan	Aja Kong	
Team Japan	Yuki Miyazaki	
Team Japan	Sumire Natsu	
Team Canada	Taya	
Team Canada	Allie	
Team Canada	K. C. Spinelli	
Team USA	Santana Garrett	
Team USA	Sienna	
Team USA	Cheerleader Melissa	

== Tournament bracket ==
=== Men's division ===
1st Round
Team AAA	Win
Team Ōdō and Zero1	—
Team Noah	Win
Team Resto del Mundo	—
Team Mexico Leyendas	—
Team Lucha Underground	Win
Team Mexico International	Win
Team TNA	—

Semifinals
Team AAA	Win
Team Noah	—
Team Lucha Underground	Win
Team Mexico International	—

Final
Team AAA	—
Team Lucha Underground	Win
3rd Place
Team Noah	—
Team Mexico International	Win

=== Women's division ===
1st Round
Team Mexico	Win
Team USA	—
Team Japan	Win
Team Canada	—

Final
Team Mexico	Win
Team Japan	—
3rd Place
Team USA	—
Team Canada	Win

== Results ==
Night 1 (June 3)
No.	Results	Stipulations	Times
1	Team Mexico (Faby Apache, Lady Apache, and Mari Apache) defeated Team USA (Cheerleader Melissa, Santana Garrett, and Sienna)	Lucha Libre World Cup: Women's Division first round trios match	5:45
2	Team Japan (Aja Kong, Natsu Sumire, and Yuki Miyazaki) defeated Team Canada (Allie, K. C. Spinelli, and Taya)	Lucha Libre World Cup: Women's Division first round trios match	7:32
3	Team Ōdō and Zero1 (Akebono, Ikuto Hidaka, and Masato Tanaka) vs. Team AAA (El Texano Jr., Pentagón Jr., and Psycho Clown) ended in a time-limit draw	Lucha Libre World Cup: Men's Division first round trios match	10:00
4	Masato Tanaka (Team Ōdō and Zero1) vs. Pentagón Jr. (Team AAA) ended in a time-limit draw	Sudden death singles match	5:00
5	El Texano Jr. (Team AAA) defeated Ikuto Hidaka (Team Ōdō and Zero1)	Sudden death singles match	3:51
6	Team NOAH (Maybach Taniguchi, Naomichi Marufuji, and Taiji Ishimori) defeated Team Resto del Mundo (Apolo, Mil Muertes, and Rockstar Spud)	Lucha Libre World Cup: Men's Division first round trios match	7:46
7	Team Lucha Underground (Brian Cage, Chavo Guerrero Jr., and Johnny Mundo) (with Dario Cueto) defeated Team Mexico Leyendas (Blue Demon Jr., Canek, and La Parka)	Lucha Libre World Cup: Men's Division first round trios match	9:09
8	Team Mexico International (Dr. Wagner Jr., Dragon Azteca Jr., and Rey Mysterio Jr.) vs. Team TNA (Eli Drake, EC3, and Tyrus) ended in a time-limit draw	Lucha Libre World Cup: Men's Division first round trios match	10:00
9	Dr. Wagner Jr. (Team Mexico International) vs. Eli Drake (Team TNA) ended in a time-limit draw	Sudden death singles match	5:00
10	EC3 (Team TNA) vs. Rey Mysterio Jr. (Team Mexico International) ended in a time-limit draw	Sudden death singles match	5:00
11	Dragon Azteca Jr. (Team Mexico International) defeated Tyrus (Team TNA)	Sudden death singles match	3:03

Night 2 (June 5)
No.	Results	Stipulations	Times
1	Team Canada (Allie, K. C. Spinelli, and Taya) defeated Team USA (Cheerleader Melissa, Santana Garrett, and Sienna)	Trios match for third place in the Lucha Libre World Cup: Women's Division	8:16
2	Team Resto del Mundo (Apolo, Mil Muertes, and Rockstar Spud) defeated Team Ōdō and Zero1 (Akebono, Ikuto Hidaka, and Masato Tanaka), Team Mexico Leyendas (Blue Demon Jr., Canek, and La Parka), and Team TNA (Eli Drake, EC3, and Tyrus) (Note: Order of elimination: Eli Drake, Rockstar Spud, Blue Demon Jr., Apolo, Canek, Akebono, EC3, Masato Tanaka, La Parka, Ikuto Hidaka, Tyrus)	Victoria Cup battle royal	12:57
3	Team AAA (El Texano Jr., Pentagón Jr., and Psycho Clown) defeated Team NOAH (Maybach Taniguchi, Naomichi Marufuji, and Taiji Ishimori)	Lucha Libre World Cup: Men's Division semifinal trios match	9:18
4	Team Lucha Underground (Brian Cage, Chavo Guerrero Jr., and Johnny Mundo) (with Dario Cueto) defeated Team Mexico International (Dr. Wagner Jr., Dragon Azteca Jr., and Rey Mysterio Jr.)	Lucha Libre World Cup: Men's Division semifinal trios match	9:57
5	Team Japan (Aja Kong, Natsu Sumire, and Yuki Miyazaki) vs. Team Mexico (Faby Apache, Lady Apache, and Mari Apache) ended in a time-limit draw	Lucha Libre World Cup: Women's Division final trios match	10:00
6	Aja Kong (Team Japan) vs. Faby Apache (Team Mexico) ended in a time-limit draw	Sudden death singles match	5:00
7	Mari Apache (Team Mexico) defeated Yuki Miyazaki (Team Japan)	Sudden death singles match	3:40
8	Dr. Wagner Jr. (Team Mexico International) vs. Naomichi Marufuji (Team NOAH) ended in a time-limit draw	Sudden death singles match for third place in the Lucha Libre World Cup: Men's Division	5:00
9	Dragon Azteca Jr. (Team Mexico International) vs. Maybach Taniguchi (Team NOAH) ended in a time-limit draw	Sudden death singles match for third place in the Lucha Libre World Cup: Men's Division	5:00
10	Rey Mysterio Jr. (Team Mexico International) defeated Taiji Ishimori (Team NOAH)	Sudden death singles match for third place in the Lucha Libre World Cup: Men's Division	4:04
11	Team AAA (El Texano Jr., Pentagón Jr., and Psycho Clown) vs. Team Lucha Underground (Brian Cage, Chavo Guerrero Jr., and Johnny Mundo) (with Dario Cueto) ended in a time-limit draw	Lucha Libre World Cup: Men's Division final trios match	10:00
12	Chavo Guerrero Jr. (Team Lucha Underground) vs. El Texano Jr. (Team AAA) ended in a time-limit draw	Sudden death singles match for the Lucha Libre World Cup: Men's Division	5:00
13	Brian Cage (Team Lucha Underground) vs. Psycho Clown (Team AAA) ended in a time-limit draw	Sudden death singles match for the Lucha Libre World Cup: Men's Division	5:00
14	Johnny Mundo (Team Lucha Underground) defeated Pentagón Jr. (Team AAA)	Sudden death singles match for the Lucha Libre World Cup: Men's Division	4:12
