= Nación Lucha Libre =

Mexican professional wrestling promotion

- Acronym: NLL
- Founded: 2019
- Style: Lucha libre
- Headquarters: Mexico City, Mexico
- Owner(s): Alberto El Patrón and Chavo Guerrero Jr.

Nación Lucha Libre is a Mexican professional wrestling promotion based in Mexico City, Mexico. The promotion, founded in 2019, was owned and managed by former WWE Champion Alberto Del Rio and Chavo Guerrero Jr. It closed down on January 8, 2020. However, As of February 9, 2021 it has been announced on their Instagram that the promotion will be returning for a Season 2 although an official date has not yet been given. On April 28, 2021 it was announced that they will be having a reunion show on July 31, 2021 in McAllen, Texas with the main event being Del Rio vs. Andrade.

== History ==
In early 2019, former AAA/CMLL/WWE/TNA luchador (wrestler) Alberto Del Rio "El Patron" posted images of a possible new promotion. On June 11, 2019, Alberto El Patron and Chavo Guerrero Jr. announced the arrival of the promotion entitled "Nación Lucha Libre". Before the first NLL event, there were modifications where they replaced Black Taurus, Laredo Kid, Dr. Wagner Jr., Fénix, Pentagon Jr., Daga, Flamita and Puma King who have an employment relationship with AAA and they appear on TV Azteca, so they cannot appear on another chain where it is not associated with NLL. On July 11, his first event was held in Mexico City in the Sala de Armas Magdalena Mixhuca. It was broadcast on the Mexico channel Imagen TV.

== See also ==
- List of professional wrestling promotions in Mexico
