= Alberto Del Rio =

Mexican professional wrestler (born 1977)

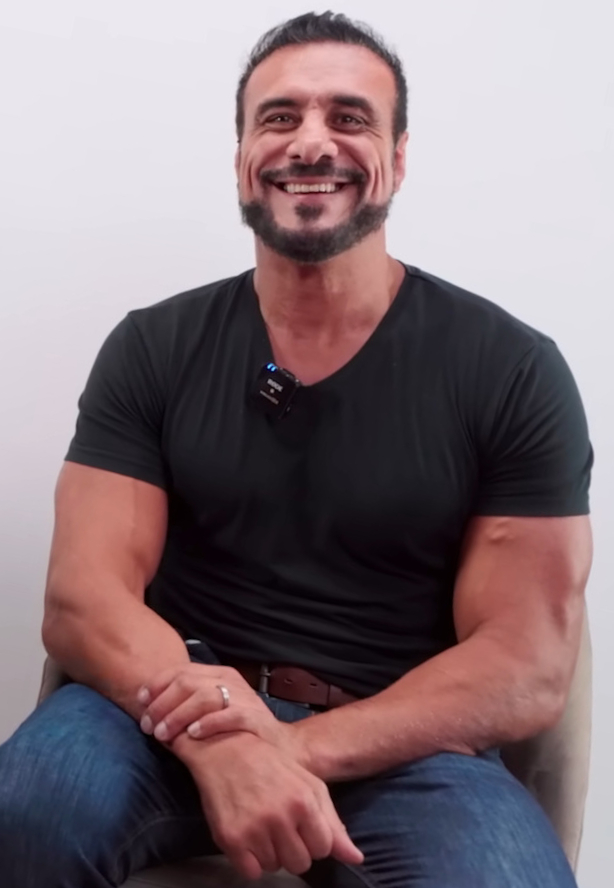
- Del Rio in 2025
- Born: José Alberto Rodríguez Chucuan; 25 May 1977 (age 49); San Luis Potosí City, San Luis Potosí, Mexico
- Education: Universidad Autónoma de San Luis Potosí
- Spouse: Angela Velkei (m. 2012; div. 2016)
- Partner(s): Saraya Bevis (engaged 2016–2017); Mary Carmen Rodríguez Lucero
- Children: 3
- Relatives: Dos Caras (father); El Hijo de Dos Caras (brother); Mil Máscaras (uncle); Sicodelico Jr. (cousin)
- Professional wrestling career
- Ring names: Alberto; Alberto Banderas; Alberto Del Rio; Alberto El Patrón; Alberto "El Presidente"; Dorado; Dos; Dos Caras; Dos Caras Jr.; El Dorado; El Hijo de Dos Caras; El Patrón; El Patrón Alberto; Hustle Kamen Gold
- Billed height: 6 ft 5 in (196 cm)
- Billed weight: 239 lb (108 kg)
- Billed from: San Luis Potosí, Mexico
- Trained by: Greco-Roman wrestling; Leonel Kolesni; Juan Fernández; Professional wrestling; Dos Caras; Sicodelico; Florida Championship Wrestling; MMA; Marco Ruas
- Debut: 29 September 2000

José Alberto Rodríguez Chucuan (born 25 May 1977) is a Mexican and American professional wrestler, professional wrestling promoter, sports commentator, and mixed martial artist. In professional wrestling, he is best known for his time in WWE under the ring name Alberto Del Rio, as well as in Impact Wrestling and Lucha Libre AAA Worldwide (AAA) under the ring name Alberto El Patrón.

Before working for WWE, Rodríguez used the ring name Dos Caras Jr. as both a mixed martial artist and luchador in mostly Mexico and Japan, achieving success in Consejo Mundial de Lucha Libre (CMLL) by winning the CMLL World Heavyweight Championship once. Rodríguez signed with WWE in 2009 and made his debut on their main roster the following year as Alberto Del Rio. In WWE, he became the first Mexican wrestler to achieve world champion in WWE history after he won the WWE Championship and the World Heavyweight Championship twice each. He also won the 2011 Royal Rumble and the 2011 Money in the Bank ladder match, making him the only professional wrestler to win both in the same calendar year.

Rodríguez departed WWE in 2014 and wrestled as Alberto El Patrón in other promotions such as Lucha Libre AAA Worldwide (AAA), Ring of Honor (ROH), Lucha Underground, Japanese and Puerto Rican promotions, and various United States independent promotions. He returned to WWE in 2015, winning the United States Championship twice, before departing again in 2016. He subsequently signed with Impact Wrestling and won the Impact World Championship before departing in 2018. Rodríguez would return to AAA in 2023, where he would win the AAA Mega Championship for a second time.

== Family and early life ==
Born in San Luis Potosí into one of the most well known Mexican wrestling families, his father is noted luchador Dos Caras, while his uncles are Mil Máscaras and Sicodelico. His cousins, Sicodelico Jr. and Hijo de Sicodelico, are also wrestlers. His younger brother Guillermo signed a WWE contract in August 2012 and was assigned to the promotion's developmental territory NXT under the ring name Memo Montenegro, but was released in July 2013.

Rodríguez graduated from Universidad Autónoma de San Luis Potosí where he earned a degree in architecture.

== Amateur wrestling ==
Growing up in a family of wrestlers Rodríguez decided to take up Greco-Roman wrestling, training under Leonel Kolesni and Juan Fernández. He earned a place on the Mexico national team in Greco-Roman wrestling and while competing on the national team obtained several accomplishments. In 1997, he placed third at the World Junior Championships, in the Czech Republic. He also won the Central American and Caribbean Games in his weight division three times and won a medal at the Pan American Games. Rodríguez was on track to compete at the 2000 Summer Olympics in Sydney, Australia, but due to a lack of funding and support, Mexico did not send a wrestling team that year.

== Professional wrestling career ==
=== AAA (2000–2002) ===
After not competing at the 2000 Olympic games, Rodríguez turned to the family business, and trained with his father to become a professional wrestler. He made his debut appearance on 9 May 2000 as Dos Caras Jr. when he ran in during an AAA (now known as Lucha Libre AAA Worldwide) show to save his father from a beat down from El Texano and Pirata Morgan. Over the next couple of years, Caras worked both in Mexico and Japan to gain experience in the ring. In Mexico he worked exclusively for AAA making appearances at shows such as the 2002 Verano de Escándalo, where he teamed with El Gronda and El Hijo del Solitario to defeat the trio of Pirata Morgan, Sangre Chicana and El Brazo.

=== Japanese promotions (2001–2004) ===
Rodríguez's first foray into puroresu was in 2001 for the Battlarts promotion, where he defeated Kazunari Murakami at the YUKI-BOM-BA-YE event. Rodríguez returned to Japan the following year wrestling for Pro Wrestling Zero1 (Zero1) and All Japan Pro Wrestling (AJPW). After wrestling for Zero1 primarily throughout 2002 and 2003, Rodríguez joined Hustle, debuting on their inaugural Hustle 1 event. He would continue to wrestle for Hustle under the ring names Dos Caras Jr. and Hustle Kamen Gold until October 2004.

=== Consejo Mundial de Lucha Libre (2005–2009) ===
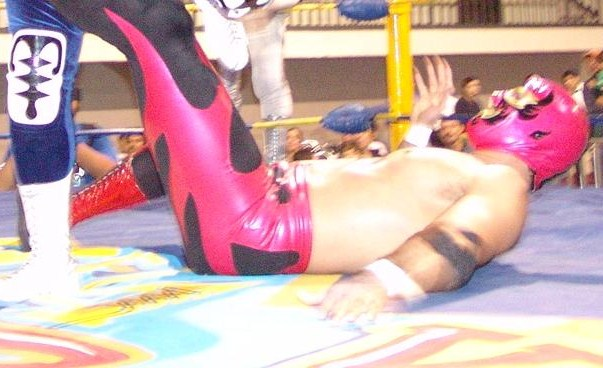
Del Río during a match as Dos Caras Jr., c. 2005

In 2005, Caras was signed to a contract with Consejo Mundial de Lucha Libre (CMLL). In his first test in the company, Caras competed in the 2005 La Copa Junior, but the storyline of the tournament saw him defeated in the semi-final by Dr. Wagner Jr. Caras's advancement to the semi-final of the cup, mere months after signing with the company was an indicator that the bookers were interested in elevating him up the rankings, this was further supported when he received matches for both the CMLL World Heavyweight Championship and the CMLL World Light Heavyweight Championship inside a three-week period. The following year on 31 March 2006 Caras was entered again into the La Copa Junior tournament and earned a return victory over Dr. Wagner Jr. who knocked him out of the tournament the previous year. He also won against Heavy Metal and Apolo Dantés to gain a place in the final, defeating Héctor Garza to win the prize. While working in Japan, Caras had taken to teaming with another second-generation wrestler, Lizmark Jr., and when both found themselves in CMLL they were teamed up once again with the team's famous fathers being the selling point. Over the next year Caras found himself without much direction, he worked storylines with Último Guerrero and Kenzo Suzuki but nothing long term came of it. Caras received two opportunities to challenge Universo 2000 for the CMLL World Heavyweight title but came up short until his third attempt on 8 July 2007 when he became the CMLL World Heavyweight Champion. While in wrestling promotions outside of Mexico the Heavyweight title would indicate that he was the top man in the federation, Mexican wrestling promotions tend to put more emphasis on the lower weight divisions over the heavyweights.

After the contract dealings with WWE surfaced he began showing signs of becoming a rudo (villain). He turned his attention away from the matches and instead try to win the approval of the fans, often costing his team the match because he was distracted. Caras himself explained this behavior by stating that he "hurt his shoulder, but bravely stayed in the arena". After hinting at a change for weeks Caras finally cemented his villainous persona on 11 April 2009, the second member of the Rodríguez family to be a heel (after his uncle, El Sicodélico Sr). Caras's run with the CMLL World Heavyweight Championship remained largely uneventful with only four title defenses in the 533 days that he held the championship, before losing it and departing for WWE.

=== World Wrestling Entertainment/WWE ===
==== Contract negotiations (2008–2009) ====
He made brief appearance for WWE as a security guard on 30 June 2008 episode of Monday Night Raw. By the fall of 2008, a story broke that Rodríguez had wrestled a dark match for World Wrestling Entertainment (WWE) and that they had offered him a contract. Over the following months conflicting reports of whether he had signed or not arose, but he remained CMLL World Heavyweight Champion. When he lost the title to Último Guerrero it was believed that he had indeed signed with WWE, with him being rumored to be a surprise participant in the 2009 Royal Rumble. However, he remained with CMLL and stated that he signed a four-year deal and chose CMLL because they offered him a better deal than WWE.

==== Florida Championship Wrestling (2009–2010) ====
On 17 June 2009, Rodríguez confirmed that he had signed a three-year contract with WWE, stating that he would not have to go to Florida Championship Wrestling (FCW), WWE's developmental territory, but directly to the main roster. Furthermore, he would retain the rights to his name, mask and image, but allow the WWE to use it for promotional purposes while he is under contract with them. He agreed to the contract since it addressed the main reasons why he turned down the WWE's offer in January 2009. Despite his claims, he had a match with Kris Logan at FCW under the name Dos. He later also went on to wrestle under the ring names Dorado and El Dorado. During a segment on the Abraham Washington show at the 6 August taping, Rodríguez revealed a new, unmasked wrestling character named Alberto Banderas. When he revealed his face, he was criticized by some Mexicans for revealing, to which he responded that only a few people know why he lost the mask in that way. During WWE's WrestleMania Revenge tour of Europe in April 2010, he made numerous appearances in untelevised matches for the Raw brand. One night he wrestled as Dos Caras, but he did not wear his mask. He was presented as a villain in a losing effort against Christian. The following month Caras put his mask back on for WWE's tour of Mexico and worked as a hometown hero, prior to returning unmasked during untelevised matches for subsequent Raw and SmackDown shows. Later, Rodríguez said that he hated his time in FCW, but that he learned a lot.

==== Early feuds (2010–2011) ====
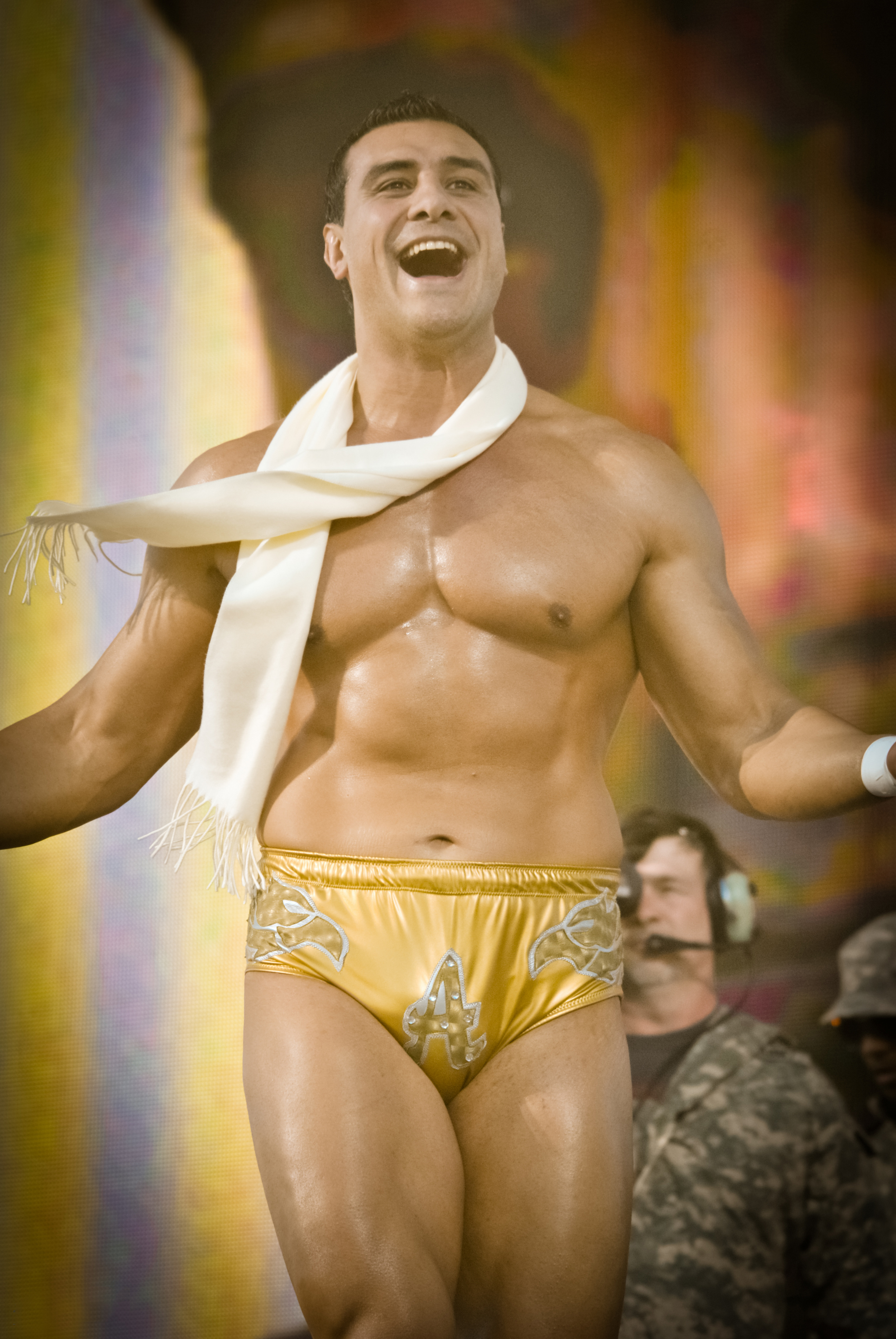
Del Rio at the 2010 Tribute to the Troops event

On 25 June 2010, episode of SmackDown, Rodríguez appeared on a taped promotional video as the unmasked Alberto Del Rio. Thereafter, a vignette aired every week on SmackDown promoting his character as an arrogant rich Mexican aristocrat, espousing his own virtues of honesty, integrity and mental faculties. After two months, Del Rio wrestled his first match at a house show in Brisbane, Australia and a week later, he made his television debut on the 20 August episode of SmackDown by defeating Rey Mysterio in the main event by submission with the cross armbreaker. As part of his act, Del Rio made his entrances in an expensive car, while he was introduced by his personal ring announcer, Ricardo Rodriguez. The following week, Del Rio continued the storyline with Mysterio by attacking him after his match with Kane, giving him a storyline injury by refusing to relinquish his armbar. Two weeks later, he defeated Matt Hardy via submission in Hardy's last appearance with the company causing Hardy's friend Christian to challenge Del Rio to a match at Night of Champions on 19 September. Despite declining the match, on the 24 September episode of SmackDown Del Rio attacked Christian and injured him the same way he did Mysterio the previous month. This was done to write Christian off television, as he had suffered a torn pectoral muscle. Mysterio returned on the 8 October episode of SmackDown, and handed Del Rio his first defeat in the main event match. On the 15 October episode of SmackDown, Del Rio defeated Chris Masters to represent the SmackDown brand at Bragging Rights on 24 October, but during the pay-per-view event, he attacked teammate Rey Mysterio, before being eliminated from the match by Team Raw's CM Punk. At Survivor Series on 21 November, in the traditional five-on-five elimination match, Del Rio captained a team against Rey Mysterio's team. Despite Del Rio's team losing, he was removed from the match after Big Show knocked him out with a WMD. On the 26 November episode of SmackDown, Del Rio defeated Big Show via countout to qualify for the 2010 King of the Ring tournament. In the tournament the next week on Raw, he made United States Champion Daniel Bryan submit in the first round, but was defeated by John Morrison in the semifinal after being distracted by Mysterio who was inside his car. At TLC: Tables, Ladders & Chairs on 19 December, Del Rio competed in a fatal four-way Tables, Ladders and Chairs match for the World Heavyweight Championship, which was won by Edge and also included Kane and Rey Mysterio. On 7 January 2011 episode of SmackDown, Del Rio defeated Mysterio in a two-out-of-three-falls match, with help from Ricardo Rodriguez by holding Mysterio out of the ring to end his long feud with Mysterio.

On the fourth season of NXT, starting in December 2010, Del Rio mentored rookie Conor O'Brian, who became the second contestant to be eliminated from the competition on 18 January. The following week the rookies competed in a fatal-four-way match, of which the winner could change their pro. Brodus Clay won the match and chose Del Rio as his new pro. After the conclusion of NXT, Del Rio hired Clay as his bodyguard.

At the Royal Rumble on 30 January, Del Rio defeated 39 other participants, last eliminating Santino Marella, to win the Royal Rumble match and earn the right to compete for either the World Heavyweight Championship or the WWE Championship at WrestleMania XXVII on 3 April. The next night on Raw, Del Rio chose to compete for Edge's World Heavyweight Championship. At Elimination Chamber on 20 February, Del Rio defeated Kofi Kingston and later attacked Edge, after he had successfully defended the World Heavyweight Championship in an Elimination Chamber match and solidified his spot as Del Rio's opponent at WrestleMania. However, Edge managed to come out the exchange victorious, after Christian returned from his injury and attacked Del Rio. On 18 March episode of SmackDown, Del Rio and Christian finally had their first one–on–one match in a steel cage, in which Christian won. At WrestleMania XXVII, Del Rio was unsuccessful in his World Heavyweight Championship match against Edge. On 8 April episode of SmackDown, Del Rio defeated Christian to earn a rematch against Edge at Extreme Rules on 1 May. However, when Edge unexpectedly retired from professional wrestling on 11 April episode of Raw, Del Rio was instead booked to face Christian in a ladder match for the vacant World Heavyweight Championship, after Christian won a battle royal.

==== WWE Champion (2011–2012) ====
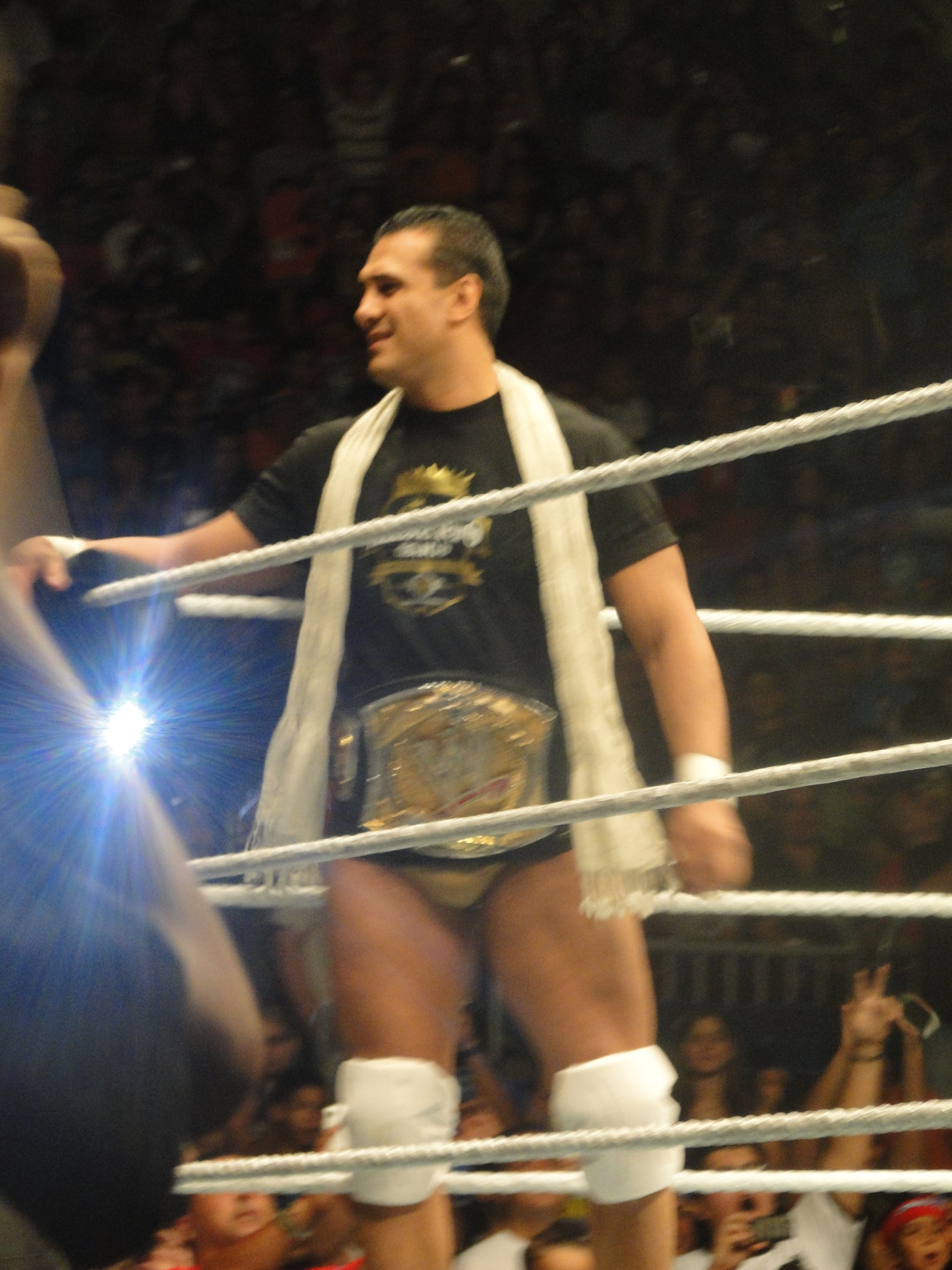
Del Rio as WWE Champion in 2011

On 25 April episode of Raw, Del Rio was drafted to the Raw brand. Ricardo Rodriguez moved to Raw with him, while Brodus Clay remained on SmackDown. At Extreme Rules, Del Rio lost to Christian in a ladder match for the vacant World Heavyweight Championship. On 23 May episode of Raw, Del Rio slapped Big Show after he had gotten into a confrontation with Ricardo Rodriguez. After competing in a match, Big Show was run over by Del Rio's car, driven by Rodriguez, leaving him sidelined with a storyline knee injury. Big Show made his return three weeks later, chasing Del Rio out of the ring and beating Rodriguez down. On 19 June at Capitol Punishment, Del Rio defeated Big Show via referee stoppage, when he was unable to continue the match due to a pre-match assault by Mark Henry. On 27 June episode of Raw, Del Rio defeated Big Show in a steel cage match, again after interference from Henry.

On 17 July at Money in the Bank, Del Rio defeated Alex Riley, Evan Bourne, Jack Swagger, Kofi Kingston, The Miz, R-Truth and Rey Mysterio in the Raw Money in the Bank ladder match for a future WWE Championship match whenever and wherever over the next year, while also becoming the first wrestler in history to win a Royal Rumble and a Money in the Bank match in the same year. Following the orders of Vince McMahon, Del Rio attempted to cash in his contract later that same night on CM Punk, who had just defeated John Cena for the WWE Championship, but was attacked and laid out by Punk before he could do so. Del Rio eventually cashed in his contract on 14 August at SummerSlam, challenging CM Punk after the main event, where he had defeated John Cena to become the undisputed WWE Champion. Between the two matches, Punk was attacked by Kevin Nash, which led to Del Rio scoring a quick pinfall victory to win the WWE Championship for the first time. In winning the title, Del Rio became the first ever Mexican-born WWE Champion. Del Rio made his first televised title defense the next night on Raw, defeating Rey Mysterio to retain his title. On 18 September at Night of Champions, Del Rio lost the championship to John Cena, but gained it back on 2 October at Hell in a Cell by defeating Cena and Punk in a Hell in a Cell match. On 23 October at Vengeance, Del Rio successfully defended the WWE Championship against John Cena in a Last Man Standing match, after The Miz and R-Truth interfered. On 20 November at Survivor Series, Del Rio lost the WWE Championship to Punk. Del Rio received a rematch for the WWE Championship on the 28 November episode of Raw SuperShow, but lost after Punk dropped him onto an exposed turnbuckle, managing to avoid a disqualification, which would have cost him the title. On 18 December at TLC: Tables, Ladders & Chairs, Del Rio failed again to regain the WWE Championship from Punk in a triple threat Tables, Ladders and Chairs match, also involving The Miz. The next night on Raw SuperShow, Del Rio suffered a torn groin muscle, which required surgery and sidelined him for four to six weeks.

==== World Heavyweight Champion (2012–2013) ====
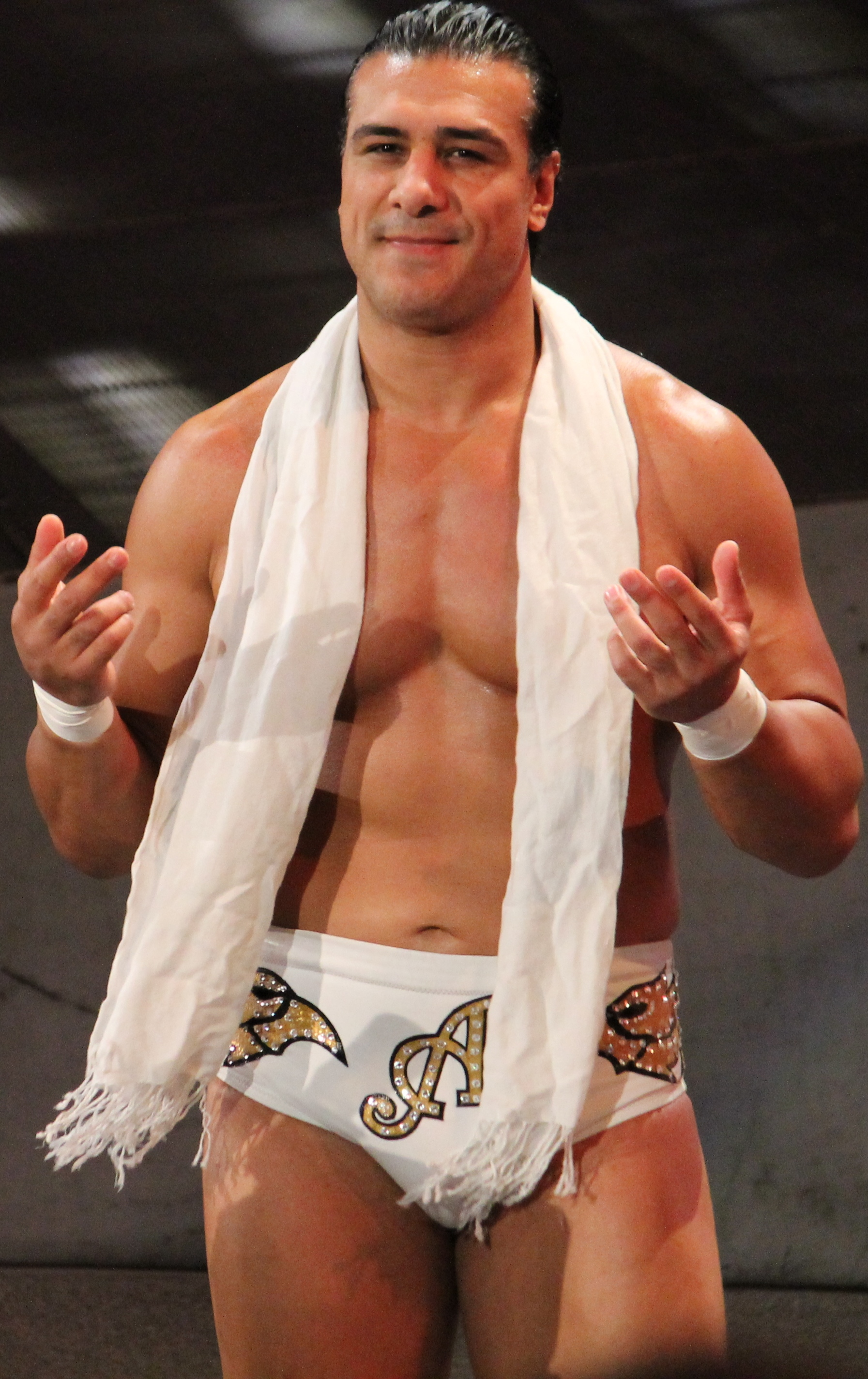
Del Rio in 2012

Del Rio returned at a WWE house show in San Francisco on 11 February 2012, arm wrestling Sheamus to a no contest. On 19 February at Elimination Chamber, Del Rio made an appearance to show support to Raw General Manager John Laurinaitis. Del Rio returned on the 2 April episode of Raw SuperShow, confronting World Heavyweight Champion Sheamus and vowing to become the next champion. On the 6 April episode of SmackDown, Del Rio defeated Sheamus in a non-title match by disqualification to earn a shot at the World Heavyweight Championship. On 20 May at Over the Limit, Del Rio failed to capture the World Heavyweight Championship from Sheamus in a fatal four-way match, also involving Chris Jericho and Randy Orton. On the 25 May episode of SmackDown, Del Rio defeated Kane and Randy Orton in a triple threat match to become the number one contender to the World Heavyweight Championship. The next week on SmackDown, Del Rio suffered a legitimate concussion, which led to WWE pulling him from his scheduled World Heavyweight Championship match against Sheamus at No Way Out. Del Rio returned on the 18 June episode of Raw SuperShow, defeating United States Champion Santino Marella in a non-title match. The next week on Raw SuperShow, Del Rio wrestled Dolph Ziggler to a no contest in a Contract on a Pole match for a shot at the World Heavyweight Championship. As a result, both Del Rio and Ziggler were entered into the championship match four days later on SmackDown, where Sheamus retained the title after pinning Ziggler. Del Rio received another shot at the World Heavyweight Championship on 15 July at Money in the Bank, where he again lost to Sheamus. The next night on Raw SuperShow, Del Rio was looking to take out his frustrations on Zack Ryder, but his post-match assault was interrupted by his longtime rival Rey Mysterio making his return and attacking him. Four days later on SmackDown, Del Rio and Ziggler lost to Mysterio and Sheamus by disqualification after Rodriguez interfered, but Del Rio viciously attacked Sheamus. On the 27 July episode of SmackDown, Del Rio defeated Daniel Bryan, Kane, and Mysterio in a fatal four-way match to again become number one contender for the World Heavyweight Championship. The title match, originally set for SummerSlam, was moved to the 10 August episode of SmackDown, after Del Rio threatened to press charges against Sheamus for stealing his car on the 6 August episode of Raw, which would have prevented Sheamus from appearing at SummerSlam. However, before the match began, Del Rio attacked Sheamus along with men posing as police officers, which led to SmackDown General Manager Booker T taking away his number one contender's status in result. However, the next week, Sheamus had the title match put back on for SummerSlam on 19 August, where Del Rio again failed in another attempt to dethrone Sheamus after the referee did not notice Del Rio's foot on the bottom rope. On the 24 August episode of SmackDown, Del Rio defeated Randy Orton by submission to once again become the number one contender for the World Heavyweight Championship. On the 7 September SmackDown, Del Rio filed assault charges against Sheamus, after Sheamus had attacked him and Rodriguez on the 3 September episode of Raw, which led to Booker T banning the Brogue Kick with the caveat that Sheamus would be stripped of the World Heavyweight Championship if he used the move again. However, on 16 September at Night of Champions, Booker T concluded his investigation into the dangers of the move and lifted the ban. In the match that followed, Sheamus used the Brogue Kick to defeat Del Rio and retain the World Heavyweight Championship.

With his rivalry with Sheamus behind him, Del Rio moved on to feuding with Randy Orton, with the two attacking each other on the 28 September episode of SmackDown. The rivalry built to a singles match on 28 October at Hell in a Cell, where Orton emerged victorious. On the 31 October episode of Main Event, Del Rio teamed with The Prime Time Players (Darren Young and Titus O'Neil) to face Orton, Rey Mysterio, and Sin Cara in six-man tag team bout that ended with Orton pinning Del Rio for the win. On the 6 November episode of SmackDown, Del Rio was again defeated by Orton in a Falls Count Anywhere match, after taking an RKO onto the ringside steel steps. The two were then on opposing teams for the traditional five-on-five elimination tag match on 18 November at Survivor Series. Del Rio's team, led by Dolph Ziggler, defeated Orton's team, led by Mick Foley, despite Del Rio being eliminated by Orton prior to the finish. The next night on Raw, Del Rio once again lost to Orton in a two-out-of-three-falls match, ending the feud.

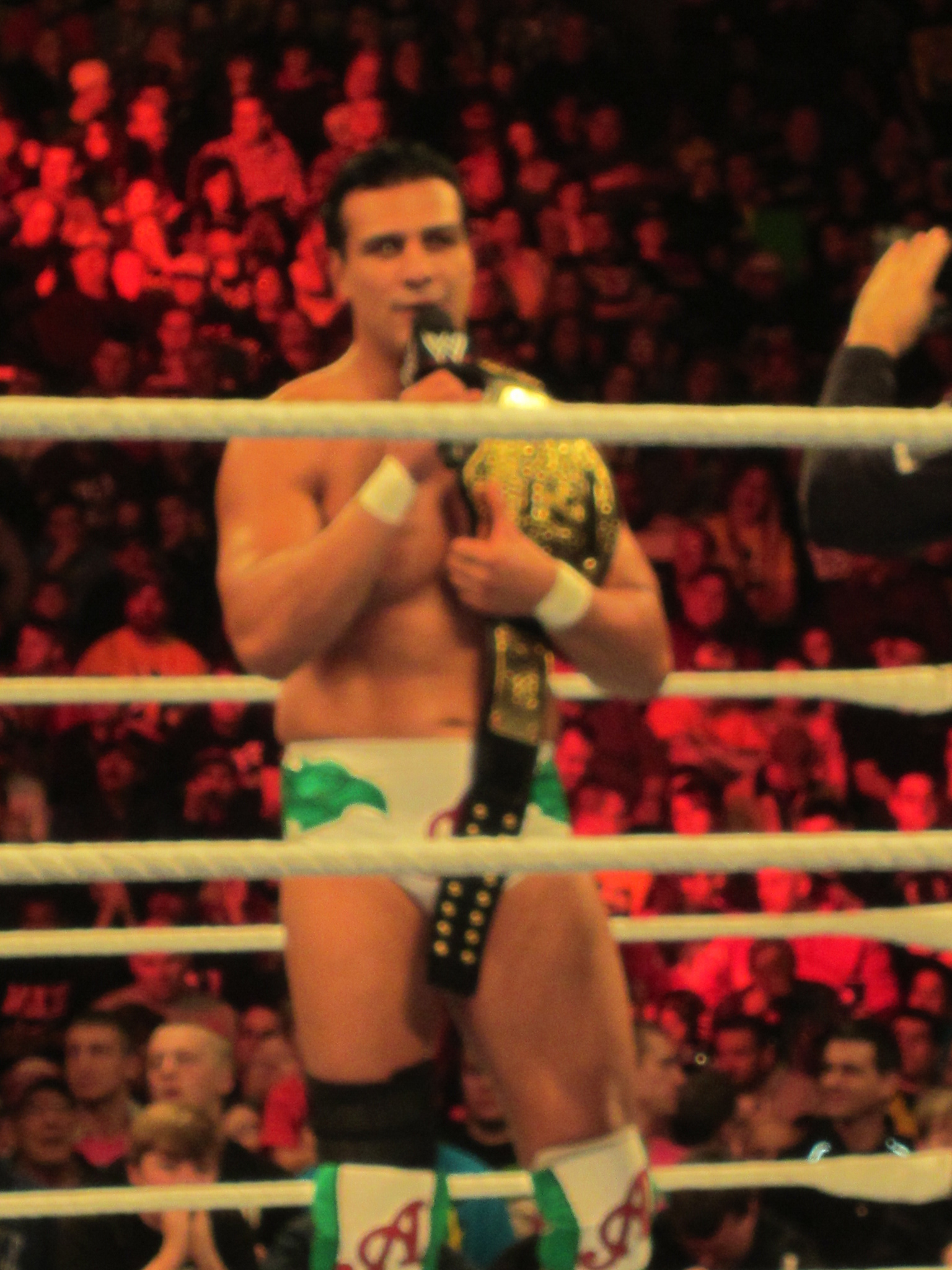
Alberto Del Rio as the World Heavyweight Champion in early 2013

On 16 December at TLC: Tables, Ladders & Chairs, Del Rio turned face when he saved Ricardo Rodriguez and the Spanish announcers from 3MB (Drew McIntyre, Heath Slater, and Jinder Mahal). Later in the event, Del Rio teamed with The Miz and The Brooklyn Brawler to defeat 3MB in a six-man tag team match. The next night on Raw, Del Rio and Miz teamed up with Tommy Dreamer to defeat 3MB in another six-man tag team match. On the 28 December episode of SmackDown, Ricardo Rodriguez was awarded a title match against World Heavyweight Champion Big Show, but Big Show knocked Rodriguez out backstage. Del Rio was then awarded the title match in Rodriguez's place, however, the match ended in a no contest after Sheamus attacked Big Show. On the 31 December episode of Raw, Big Show chose to defend his title against Ricardo Rodriguez. As Rodriguez was about to lose the match, Del Rio attacked Big Show from behind, causing a disqualification and re-igniting a feud between Del Rio and Big Show. On the 11 January episode SmackDown, as Del Rio's character transitioned into a hero of the Latino fanbase, he defeated Big Show in a Last Man Standing match to win his first World Heavyweight Championship. Del Rio made his first successful title defense on 27 January at the Royal Rumble, defeating Big Show in another Last Man Standing match, after Rodriguez duct taped Big Show's legs to the ropes. After repeated attacks from Big Show to both himself and Rodriguez, Del Rio and Big Show faced off in a singles match on 17 February at Elimination Chamber, where Del Rio submitted him to the cross armbreaker to retain his title. Del Rio then began a feud with his new number one contender, Jack Swagger, over his opposing political views regarding immigration in America. The feud escalated on the 18 March episode of Raw, when Swagger broke Rodriguez's ankle with his Patriot Lock submission. Del Rio continued feuding with Swagger on the 1 April episode of Raw, defeating Swagger's manager Zeb Colter via disqualification after Colter hit Del Rio with Ricardo Rodriguez's crutch. On 7 April at WrestleMania 29, Del Rio defeated Swagger via submission to retain the World Heavyweight Championship. The next night on Raw, Del Rio defeated Swagger and Zeb Colter in a Two-on-one handicap match after forcing Swagger to submit to the cross armbreaker. After that, Del Rio lost the World Heavyweight Championship to Dolph Ziggler who cashed in his Money in the Bank briefcase, ending his reign at 90 days. After losing the title, Del Rio would continue feud with Swagger and Ziggler over the title. On the 29 April episode of Raw, Ricardo Rodriguez defeated Big E Langston and Zeb Colter in a three-way match to give Del Rio the right to choose the stipulation of his three-way match at Extreme Rules and chose a ladder match. However, Ziggler would suffer a legitimate concussion at a SmackDown taping, thus removing their match from Extreme Rules. In result of Ziggler's injury, Del Rio instead would be booked to face Swagger in a number one contender "I Quit" match at Extreme Rules on 19 May, which Del Rio won. In the following weeks, Del Rio would face Ziggler's enforcer Big E. Langston in a series of matches, which Del Rio won 3–2.

Del Rio finally received his title shot on 16 June at Payback, and during the match, a double-turn occurred; Del Rio turned heel once again by repeatedly and ruthlessly targeting Ziggler's head after his recent concussion to defeat Ziggler and regain the World Heavyweight Championship. Del Rio later explained that he targeted Ziggler's head the same way Ziggler targeted Del Rio's injured leg when Ziggler cashed in Money in the Bank to win the title from Del Rio. On 14 July at Money in the Bank, Del Rio defeated Ziggler by disqualification to retain the World Heavyweight Championship, after Ziggler's girlfriend AJ Lee hit Del Rio in the face with her Divas Championship belt. The next night on Raw, Del Rio defeated Ziggler in a non-title rematch after a distraction by AJ. On the 29 July episode of Raw, Del Rio re-entered a feud with Christian after losing to him in a non-title match. On the 2 August episode of SmackDown, after Christian won a triple-threat match to become the number on contender to the World Heavyweight Championship, Del Rio attacked him during a post-match interview. On the 5 August episode of Raw, Del Rio lost a non-title match to Rob Van Dam, after Ricardo Rodriguez's interference backfired, which led to Del Rio viciously attacking Rodriguez post-match. On the 9 August episode of SmackDown, Del Rio again lost to Christian in a non-title match. On 18 August at SummerSlam, Del Rio successfully defended the World Heavyweight Championship against Christian. Upon Rodriguez's return, he aligned himself with Rob Van Dam, accompanying him to matches and helping him defeat Del Rio in a non-title match to earn a shot at the World Heavyweight Championship. On the 13 September episode of SmackDown, Del Rio defeated Rodriguez in a single match. On 15 September Night of Champions, Van Dam defeated Del Rio by disqualification after Del Rio refused to relinquish the cross armbreaker, retaining the World Heavyweight Championship in result. After the match, Van Dam attacked Del Rio and executed the Van Terminator. On 6 October at Battleground, Del Rio defeated Van Dam in a Hardcore match by submission to again retain the World Heavyweight Championship. The next night on Raw, Del Rio lost to Ricardo Rodriguez after Vickie Guerrero announced his Hell in a Cell opponent as John Cena. Afterwards, Del Rio brutally attacked Rodriguez. On 27 October at Hell in a Cell, Del Rio lost the World Heavyweight Championship to Cena, ending his reign at 133 days. Del Rio received his rematch for the title on 24 November at Survivor Series, but again lost to Cena.

==== Final feuds and departure (2013–2014) ====
The following night on the 25 November episode of Raw, Del Rio teamed up with Randy Orton in a losing effort against John Cena and Big Show in a tag team match. On the 2 and 9 December episodes of Raw, Del Rio suffered upset losses to the returning Sin Cara. Del Rio finally defeated Sin Cara on the 6 January 2014, episode of Raw. After the match, Del Rio insulted the soon-to-be returning Batista and that he would eliminate Batista in the Royal Rumble to get everyone talking about him. On the 13 January episode of Raw, he defeated Rey Mysterio and after the match, once again confronted Batista. On the 20 January episode of Raw, after he defeated Rey Mysterio, Batista returned and attacked Del Rio with a Batista Bomb. Six days later at the Royal Rumble, Del Rio entered the Rumble match at number 27 and performed well, but was eliminated by Batista who went on to win the match. On the 3 February episode of Raw, Del Rio confronted and ultimately assaulted Batista, which led to Batista powerbombing Del Rio through the broadcast table the following week. Before that, Del Rio squashed Dolph Ziggler. This led to a match between Del Rio and Batista at Elimination Chamber, which Batista won. The following night on Raw, Del Rio defeated Batista in a rematch from the previous night. At WrestleMania XXX, Del Rio participated in the Andre the Giant memorial battle royal and made a number of eliminations before being eliminated by Sheamus.

On the 2 June episode of Raw, Del Rio defeated Dolph Ziggler to qualify for the 2014 Money in the Bank ladder match which later became for the vacant WWE World Heavyweight Championship; Del Rio would lose the match to John Cena. On the 4 July episode of SmackDown, Del Rio unsuccessfully challenged Sheamus for the United States Championship. He defeated Ziggler on the 7 July episode of Raw to earn another United States Championship opportunity against Sheamus, but was again unsuccessful after a Last Man Standing match the following night on Main Event. At Battleground he participated in a battle royal for the vacant Intercontinental Championship but was eliminated by Dolph Ziggler. Del Rio lost several matches over the following weeks and was fired from WWE on 7 August, due to "unprofessional conduct" following an altercation with an employee who allegedly made a racist joke.

=== Return to AAA (2014–2015, 2018) ===
On 11 August 2014, AAA announced that after bring fired by WWE, Rodríguez would be returning to the promotion at Triplemanía XXII. In a press conference on 14 August, Rodríguez acknowledged that WWE owned the Alberto Del Rio name and also revealed that he would be working for AAA under the new ring name El Patrón ("The Boss"). He was nicknamed this in WWE by Ricardo Rodriguez, during ring introductions and Spanish commentary, but it was not trademarked. Rodríguez also stated that for the moment he was under a 90-day no-compete clause, which would prevent him from wrestling for AAA. He later also revealed that as part of his departure from WWE, Del Rio was banned from wrestling in the United States for one year. On 17 August at Triplemanía XXII, El Patrón and his father Dos Caras appeared to open the show, speaking on coming to AAA and addressing WWE, claiming that the company was racist. They were interrupted by the Los Perros del Mal stable. After one of the members laid his hands on Caras, El Patrón ran after the stable and cleared house, while officials reminded him that he has the no-compete clause from the WWE. The show ended with El Patrón attacking Los Perros del Mal leader El Hijo del Perro Aguayo, after his win in the main event. In early September 2014, Rodríguez's lawyers had resolved his issues with WWE and he was no longer restricted by the 90-day no-compete clause. On 14 September, Rodríguez, now billed as "El Patrón Alberto", made his AAA in-ring return teaming with Myzteziz and La Parka in a six-man tag team main event, where they defeated Aguayo, Averno and El Texano Jr. Alberto then began feuding with El Texano Jr. over the AAA Mega Championship. On 28 November, Ricardo Rodriguez made his AAA debut, once again becoming Alberto's personal ring announcer. On 7 December at Guerra de Titanes, Alberto defeated El Texano Jr. to become the new AAA Mega Champion. With the win, Rodríguez became the first wrestler to have held both the CMLL and AAA world heavyweight championships. On 24 May 2015, Alberto came together with Myzteziz and Rey Mysterio Jr. to form the "Dream Team" for AAA's Lucha Libre World Cup. The trio eventually won the tournament, defeating Johnny Mundo, Matt Hardy and Mr. Anderson in the finals. At Triplemanía XXIII, El Patrón defeated Brian Cage in a Hair vs. Hair Lucha de Apuestas. At Héroes Inmortales IX, El Patrón retained the Mega Championship against Johnny Mundo.

After Rodríguez returned to WWE and it became clear that he would not return to AAA to defend the Mega Championship and was therefore stripped of the title on 9 November. WWE had allowed him to participate at Guerra de Titanes but when the event was canceled, WWE rescinded the offer.

In 2018, it was announced that El Patrón would make his return at Triplemanía XXVI, facing a mysterious opponent. However, during a press conference on 21 August, AAA did not mention El Patrón's match as part of the final card. Rodríguez explained he would not appear since he had an unsuccessful discussion with Dorian Roldán over money and they did not find an opponent for him. Roldán said that Rodríguez had no communication with the promotion, so they did not include him in the final card.

=== World Wrestling Council (2014–2015, 2016–2017) ===
On 24 August 2014, the World Wrestling Council began a storyline by airing a backstage segment where heel manager Juan Manuel Ortega talked by telephone with someone only identified as "patrón" and referenced a reunion previously held at WrestleMania XXX. The following week featured a segment where the manager picked Ricardo Rodriguez from Luis Muñoz Marín International Airport and drove to a golf club where Ray González Sr. (who had been feuding with several of Ortega's protégés) was playing a round. There it was revealed that the former WWE ring announcer had been sent on behalf of El Patrón, delivering a sign of disrespect as a "personal message" before fleeing the scene. The following week a match between both was confirmed for Septiembre Negro, where González Sr. defeated and injured Rodriguez (now promoted as "El Emisario del Patrón") and immediately challenged El Patrón to a match at WWC Aniversario. On 24 September 2014, the storyline with Rodriguez continued, when he was depicted calling Ortega to confirm the presence of El Patrón at Aniversario. However, after being announced he was unable to make an appearance and the storyline digressed, with Hernandez supplanting him at Aniversario.

On 7 November 2015, WWC resumed the angle with El Patrón, beginning with a segment where he assaulted Ray González's son, El Hijo de Ray González, during a training session at Texas Wrestling Academy in retaliation for the injury that his father inflicted on Rodriguez. The following day, Ray González Sr. challenged El Patrón to a match. The majority of the promotional skits were filmed before he returned to WWE, but was given continuity, being the only external appearance cleared by the promotion after the enactment of a new contract. On 5 December 2015, González Sr. defeated El Patrón (who, by then was the WWE United States Champion) by disqualification in WWC's season closing event, Lockout.

On 15 October 2016, El Patrón returned to World Wrestling Council (WWC) at the second night of WWC's annual Aniversario event, where he faced Ray Gonzalez in a "Jaula de la Muerte" match.

=== Wrestle-1 (2014) ===
On 1 November 2014, Rodríguez, working under the ring name "Alberto", made his debut for the Japanese Wrestle-1 promotion, defeating Masakatsu Funaki.

=== Ring of Honor (2014–2015) ===
On 11 December 2014, Ring of Honor (ROH) announced that Rodríguez, billed as "Alberto El Patrón", had signed to make his debut for the promotion on 3 January 2015. He defeated Christopher Daniels in his debut match. During the ROH Winter Warriors tour on 30–31 January, El Patrón defeated A. C. H. and Roderick Strong. On 1 March 2015, at ROH 13th Anniversary Show, El Patrón unsuccessfully challenged Jay Lethal for the ROH World Television Championship.

=== World Wrestling League (2015) ===
Rodríguez competed for the World Wrestling League defeating champion Glamour Boy Shane and Ricky Banderas to capture the WWL World Heavyweight Championship in January 2015. The title was vacated on 19 September 2015, after a controversy during a defense against Ricky Banderas.

=== Lucha Underground (2015) ===
On 17 January 2015, Lucha Underground announced that Rodríguez had signed with the promotion. He debuted at the promotion's television tapings in Los Angeles, California later that same day. During his debut, Rodríguez, billed as Alberto El Patrón, was attacked by his AAA rival El Texano Jr., who was also making his debut. This led to a match on the 25 March episode, where he successfully defended the AAA Mega Championship against El Texano Jr. in a Bullrope match. On 6 May, Alberto defeated Johnny Mundo in a match for the number one contender for the Lucha Underground Championship. However, on 13 May 2015, Alberto was defeated by Hernandez after Mundo threw him against a window, losing his opportunity. Then, Alberto and Mundo feuded until Ultima Lucha, where Mundo defeated Alberto after an interference from Melina, Mundo's girlfriend.

=== Return to WWE (2015–2016) ===
Del Rio made a surprise return to the WWE at Hell in a Cell on 25 October 2015, with Zeb Colter as his manager, and defeated John Cena to win the United States Championship. The next night on Raw, Del Rio revealed that he and Zeb Colter had started their new country "MexAmerica" and unofficially renamed the United States Championship the "MexAmerican Championship". In November, Del Rio took part in the tournament for the vacant WWE World Heavyweight Championship, defeating Stardust in the first round and Kalisto in the quarterfinals, before being eliminated by Roman Reigns in the semi–finals at Survivor Series.

On the 30 November episode of Raw, Del Rio joined Sheamus' new stable, The League of Nations, and a week later ended his association with Zeb Colter. After retaining his championship against Jack Swagger, in a chairs match, at the TLC: Tables, Ladders & Chairs pay-per-view, Del Rio reignited his feud with John Cena, after the latter returned on 28 December. On the 11 January episode of Raw, Del Rio lost the United States Championship to Kalisto, regained the championship on the 14 January episode of SmackDown, but lost it again to Kalisto at Royal Rumble. After scoring three tag team victories over Kalisto and his partner Sin Cara, Del Rio demanded a two-out-of-three falls match for the United States Championship at Fastlane, which Del Rio then lost 1–2.

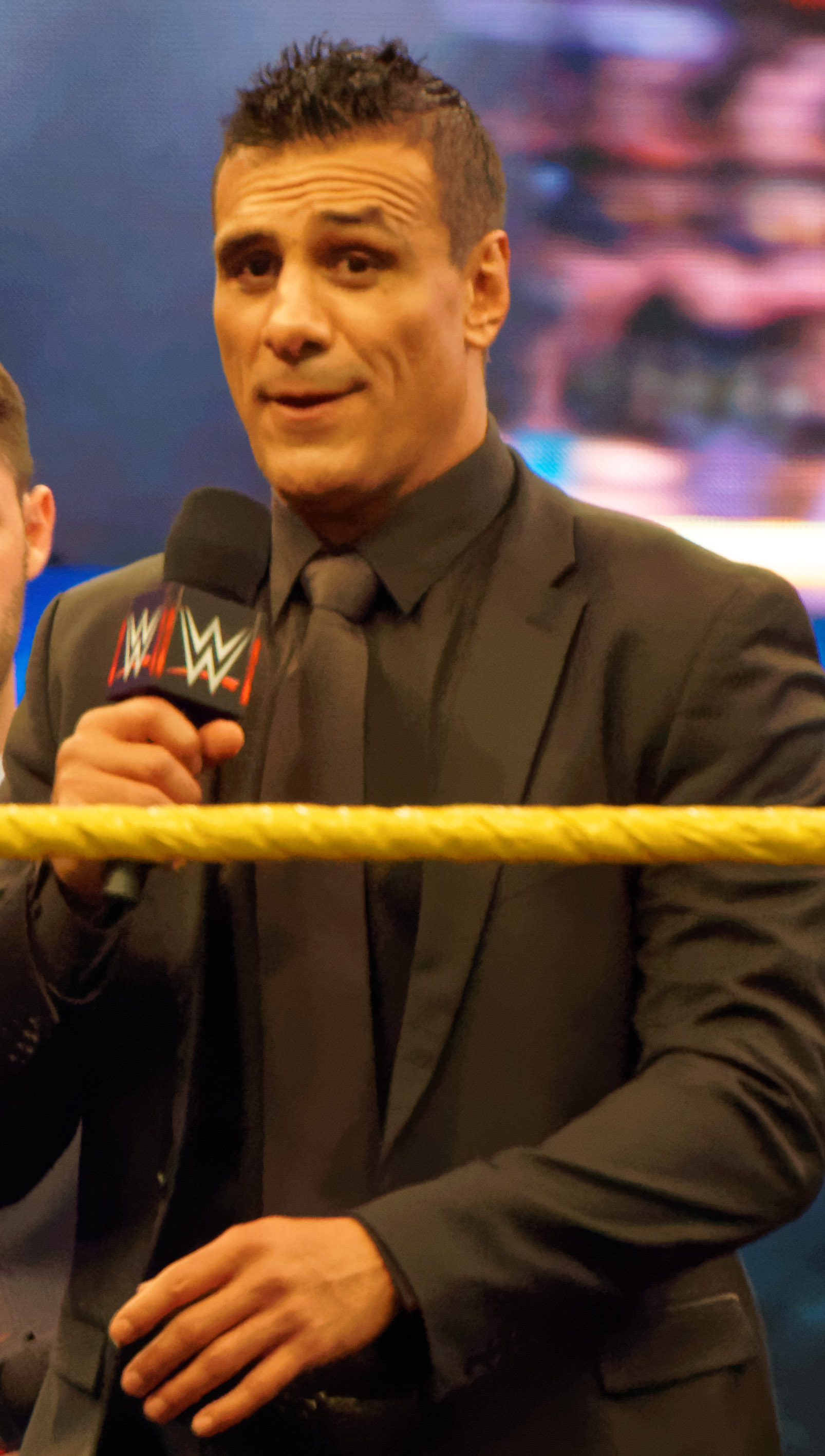
Del Rio in April 2016

At WrestleMania 32, Del Rio was part of a six-man tag match along with his fellow League of Nations members Sheamus and Rusev, against The New Day, where his team won when Sheamus pinned Xavier Woods. After WrestleMania, The League of Nations began to dissolve when King Barrett was ejected from the group on the 4 April episode of Raw, where Del Rio and the rest of the group attacked him. On the 28 April episode of SmackDown, the group officially disbanded after Del Rio and Rusev walked out on Sheamus during a six-man tag match against Kalisto, Cesaro and Sami Zayn.

On the 2 May episode of Raw, Del Rio was involved in a Battle Royal to determine the No. 1 contender for Kalisto's United States Championship, but was eliminated by Zack Ryder. On the 26 May episode of SmackDown, Del Rio defeated Zack Ryder to qualify for the 2016 Money in the Bank ladder match. At Money in the Bank, Del Rio was unsuccessful as the match was won by Dean Ambrose. During the 2016 WWE draft, Del Rio was drafted to the SmackDown brand. On the 26 July episode of SmackDown Live, Del Rio participated in a 16-man battle royal to determine who would advance in a number one contenders tournament for the WWE World Championship, he was ultimately unsuccessful in the match. His last appearance in WWE was on the 16 August episode of SmackDown Live, in which Del Rio was defeated by John Cena.

On 18 August 2016, Rodríguez was suspended for thirty days for his first violation of WWE's wellness policy. On 30 August, it was reported that Rodríguez would be exercising an opt-out clause from his WWE contract, allowing his departure should he be unhappy with his position within the company. Reportedly, Rodríguez was unhappy with WWE, claiming he had been given empty promises, including a main event push, when he made his return in October 2015. On 9 September, WWE officially announced that they had come to terms with his release from the company.

=== Independent circuit (2016–2022) ===
Following his second departure from WWE, Rodríguez would begin taking bookings on the independent circuit, returning to his Alberto El Patrón ring name. He stated that he did not want to sign with any promotion and would limit himself to 60 dates per year for the next two years before retiring from professional wrestling. Rodríguez was scheduled to return to AAA on 2 October at Héroes Inmortales X, but ended up no-showing the event. The following day, Rodríguez claimed that he had been attacked by a "knife-wielding criminal" at a restaurant prior to the event, suffering multiple lacerations on his arm and other parts of the body.

El Patrón made a number of appearances for the What Culture Pro Wrestling (WCPW) promotion, ending Big Damo's WCPW career in his first match before challenging unsuccessfully for WCPW's Internet and Tag Team Championships. He was forced to miss the "Delete WCPW" PPV on 30 November 2016, due to flight issues but was at their "Loaded" episode taping the following day, defeating Johnny Mundo.

El Patrón made a number of appearances for World Association Of Wrestling (WAW) promotion, El Patrón defeated Robbie Dynamite via pinfall then El Patrón defeating Chris Masters in the same event and won WAW Undisputed World Heavyweight Championship.

In 2019, Rodríguez and Chavo Guerrero Jr. created their own promotion, Nación Lucha Libre, which aired their first show on a television channel.

=== Impact Wrestling (2017–2018) ===
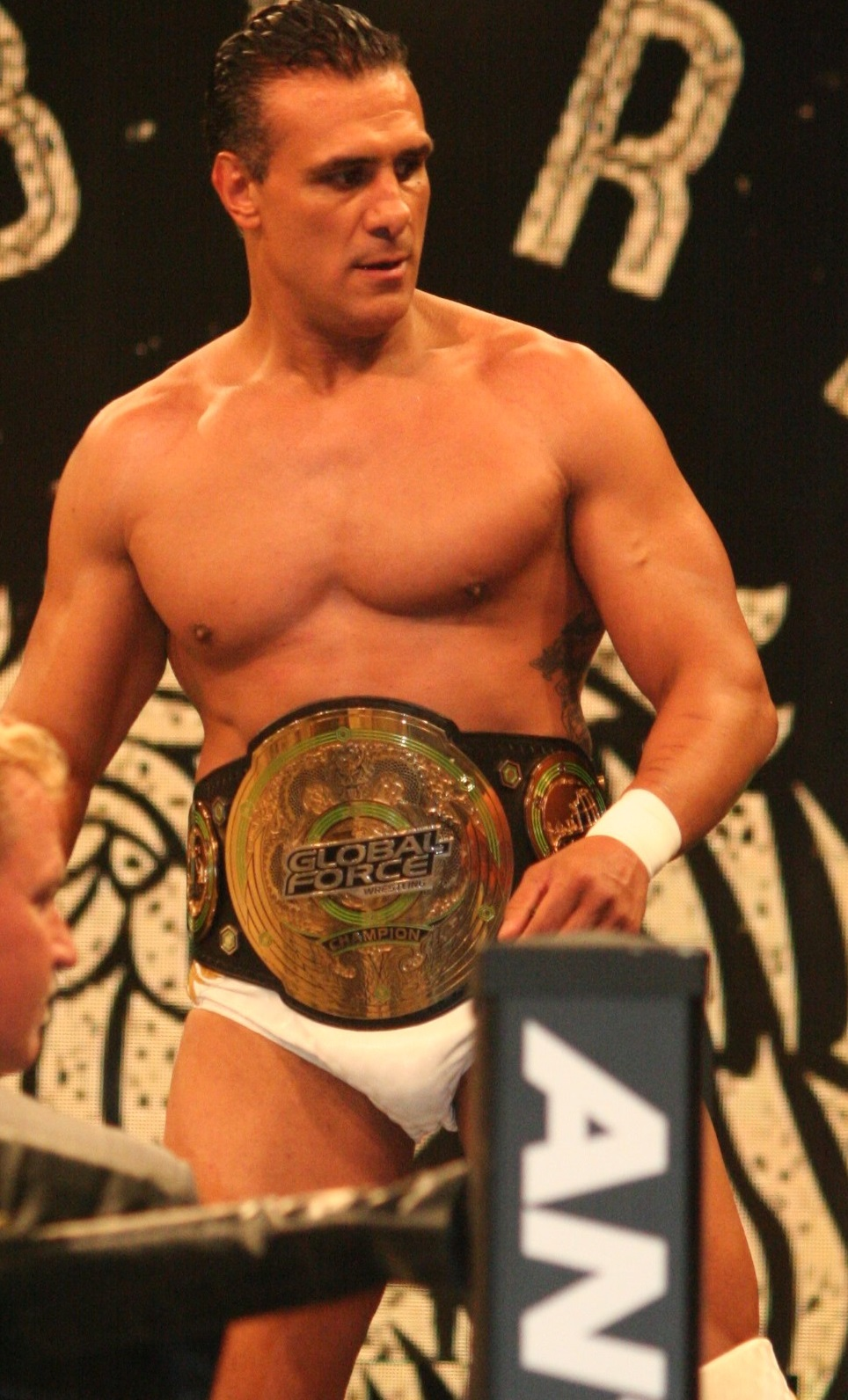
El Patrón as GFW Global Champion

During the Impact Wrestling tapings on 2 March 2017, Rodríguez debuted for Impact Wrestling, under the ring name Alberto El Patrón. He would defeat Magnus to win the GFW Global Championship on the television show and defeated Lashley at Slammiversary, El Patrón defeated Lashley to unify the GFW and the Impact Wrestling Championship. As champion, he started a feud with the stable LAX, most notably with the newest member, Low Ki. El Patron was scheduled to defend his Unified GFW World Heavyweight Championship against Low Ki at Destination X, but on 12 July 2017, El Patrón was suspended due to a personal domestic violence issue with his girlfriend Paige. As a result of the suspension, on 14 August, he was stripped of the title.

On 5 November 2017, at Bound for Glory, El Patrón returned from suspension. He was released from Impact on 7 April 2018 after no-showing the Lucha Underground vs Impact Wrestling event in New Orleans.

=== Second return to AAA (2023–2025) ===
On 19 March 2023, El Patrón made his first appearance in AAA in over seven years at the 2023 Lucha Libre World Cup. He was part of the "Dream Team" that was defeated in the semi-final, and wrestled as a técnico. On 27 April 2024 at Triplemanía XXXII: Monterrey he lost to Nic Nemeth (the former Dolph Ziggler) in a match for the vacant AAA Mega Championship. At Triplemanía XXXII: Mexico City on 17 August 2024, El Patrón reclaimed the title from Nemeth, turning rudo and aligning himself with Konnan and Dorian Roldán.

On 31 May 2025, El Patrón lost his title to El Hijo del Vikingo at Alianzas, ending his reign at 287 days. On 25 July at Alianzas, El Patrón lost to El Mesías and was exiled from AAA, ending his third tenure with the promotion. He continued to appear in AAA affiliated shows until October 2025.

=== Return to independent circuit (2025–present) ===
Rodríguez returned to the independent circuit following his release from AAA in 2025. He defeated Gilbert at WWC Euphoria on 24 January 2026. Rodríguez also made multiple appearances for The Crash Lucha Libre in 2026, however he was indefinitely suspended from the promotion in April 2026 following his arrest for domestic violence.

Rodríguez returned to wrestling after his release, teaming with L. A. Park to face Cibernético and Dr. Wagner Jr. on 1 May. Rodríguez was defeated by Xavant in a match for the WWC Puerto Rico Championship on Night One of WWC Aniversario 53 which took place on 27 June. On Night Two which took place on 28 June, he defeated Jake Hager. At WWC's Summer Madness event on 18 July, Rodríguez defeated Ray González.

== Mixed martial arts career ==
Dos Caras Jr.
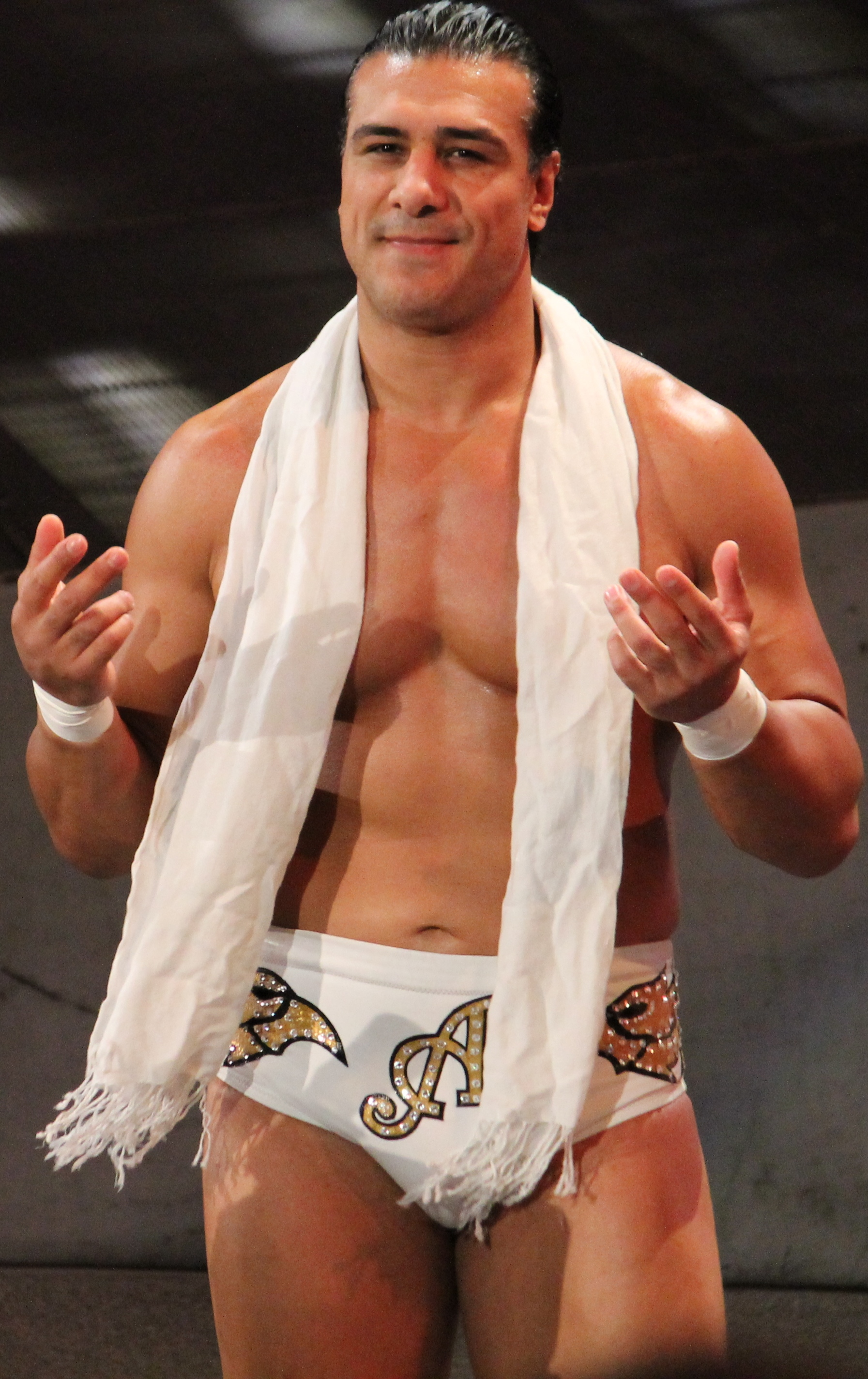
- Born: 25 May 1977 (age 49); San Luis Potosí, Mexico
- Nationality: Mexican
- Height: 1.96 m (6 ft 5 in)
- Weight: 96 kg (212 lb; 15.1 st)
- Division: Heavyweight
- Style: Professional wrestling
- Fighting out of: San Luis Potosí, Mexico
- Years active: 2001–2010, 2019

Mixed martial arts record
- Total: 15
- Wins: 9
- By knockout: 2
- By submission: 7
- Losses: 5
- By knockout: 2
- By submission: 1
- By decision: 1
- By disqualification: 1
- No contests: 1

Other information
- Mixed martial arts record from Sherdog

=== Early career ===
After making his professional wrestling debut in 2000, Dos Caras Jr. decided to try his hand at mixed martial arts (MMA). Dos Caras most notably faced Mirko Cro Cop in the Pride Fighting Championships promotion, losing by first-round head kick knockout.

=== Combate Americas ===
On 11 October 2016, he was named President of MMA promotion Combate Americas. The presidency was a figurehead role, where Rodríguez held no actual power in the company and was mainly in charge of promoting the brand to Mexican media. Rodríguez stepped down from the role on 20 July 2017, to concentrate on his professional wrestling career.

On 9 July 2019, it was announced that Rodríguez would be returning to mixed martial arts competition for the first time since 2010 to take on UFC Hall of Famer and former UFC Light Heavyweight Champion Tito Ortiz in Combate Americas. The event, which was contested at a catchweight of 210 pounds, took place in Hidalgo, Texas on 7 December 2019. Rodríguez lost the bout via first round submission.

=== Ultimate Fighting Championship ===
In March 2022, it was reported that Rodríguez had signed with the Ultimate Fighting Championship (UFC) as a Spanish-language commentator. He debuted for the promotion on 19 March at their UFC Fight Night: Volkov vs. Aspinall event.

== Personal life ==
Rodríguez was previously married to Angela Velkei, with whom he has three children. Velkei filed for divorce from Rodríguez in June 2016 and stated that the marriage ended the previous month due to adultery. On 28 April 2022, Del Río shared a video asking for blood donations for Velkei, who was hospitalized on the Hospital San José in Satélite, Naucalpan, State of Mexico, though without disclosing the health issue for which she was hospitalized. On 2 May of the same year, Del Río announced on his social media that Velkei had died.

In May 2016, Rodríguez and fellow professional wrestler Saraya-Jade Bevis, better known as Paige, went public with their relationship. The two became engaged in October 2016. They split up in late 2017. On 14 July 2021, during an interview with Hannibal TV, Rodriguez made threats to expose Paige for previous arrests and also made claims of domestic violence against her.

Rodríguez owned a restaurant in San Antonio, Texas named La Cantinita, which opened in 2016. However, the restaurant closed in November 2017. On 24 May 2018, Rodríguez became a naturalized citizen of the United States.

From at least 2024 to 2026, Rodríguez was in a relationship with Mary Carmen Rodríguez Lucero, who is a professional cyclist.

=== Legal issues ===
Rodríguez was arrested on 9 May 2020, in San Antonio, Texas after allegedly battering and sexually assaulting his girlfriend Reyna Quintero. He was booked into the Bexar County jail and charged with one count of sexual assault and one count of assault causing bodily harm. Rodríguez was later released on $50,000 bail at approximately 3:30 A.M. on 10 May. On 9 October, Rodríguez was indicted by a grand jury and formally charged with aggravated kidnapping and sexual assault, two felonies. Rodriguez's trial was delayed several times, until the charges were ultimately dropped on 10 December 2021.

On 6 April 2026, Rodríguez was arrested in San Luis Potosí by the State Civil Guard after his partner Mary Carmen reported via 911 that she was the victim of domestic violence. He was released on 11 April under condition of him paying Mex$ 1.13 million to his partner, attending rehabilitation therapy and following a restraining order after reaching a settlement with her.

== Championships and accomplishments ==
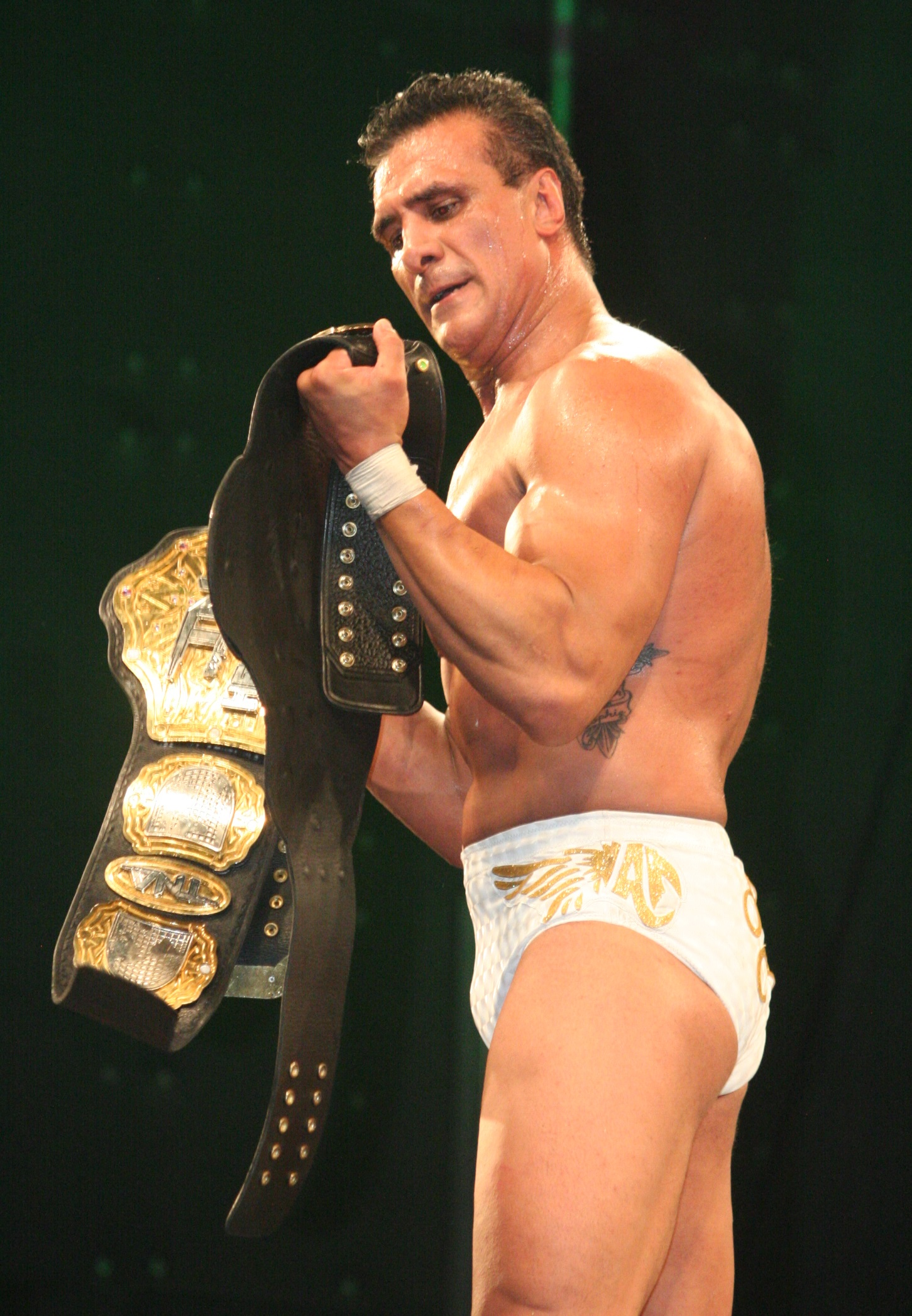
El Patrón is a one-time Unified GFW World Heavyweight Champion

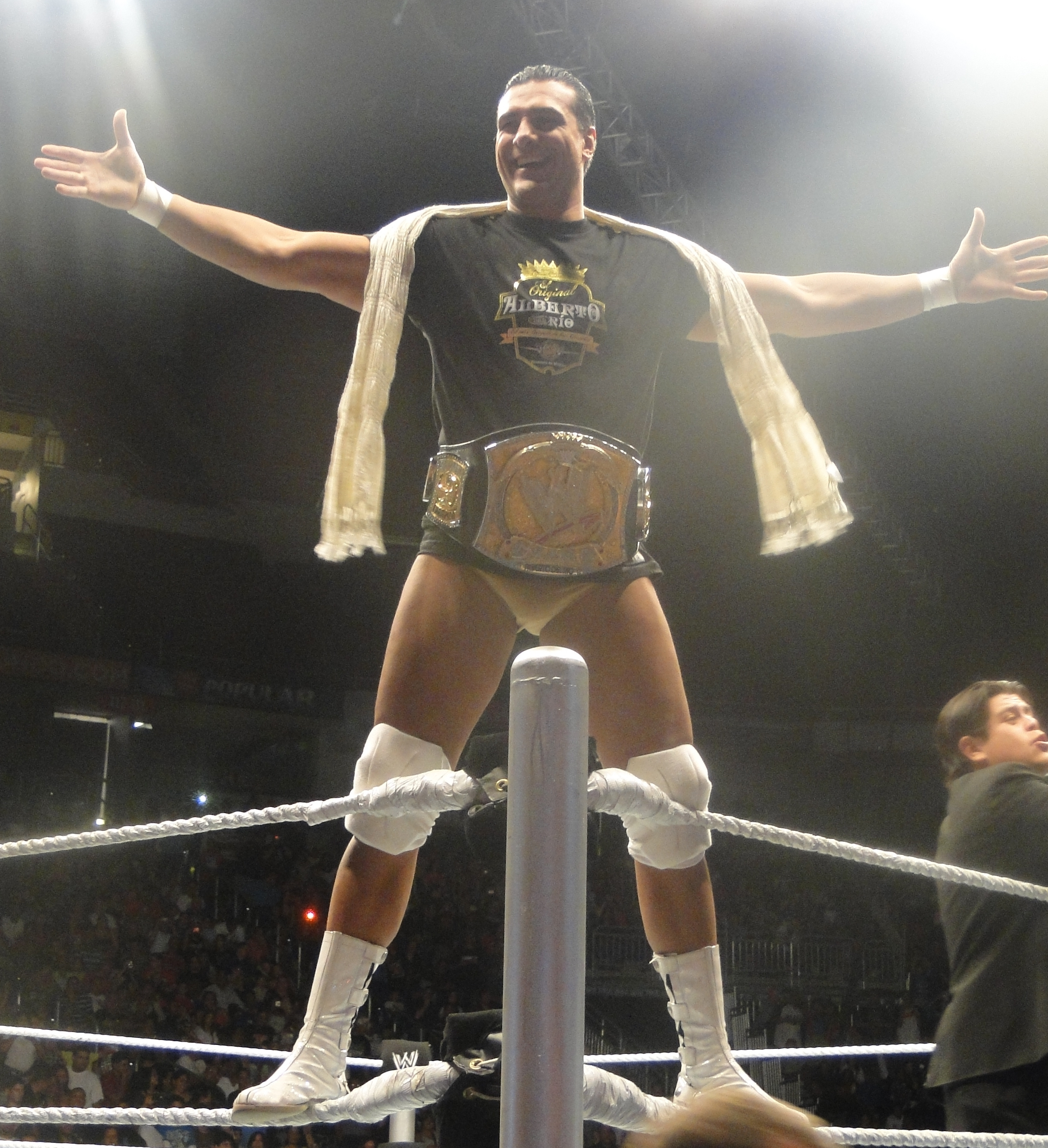
Del Rio is a two-time WWE Champion

Del Rio is a two-time World Heavyweight Champion, making him a four-time world champion overall in WWE

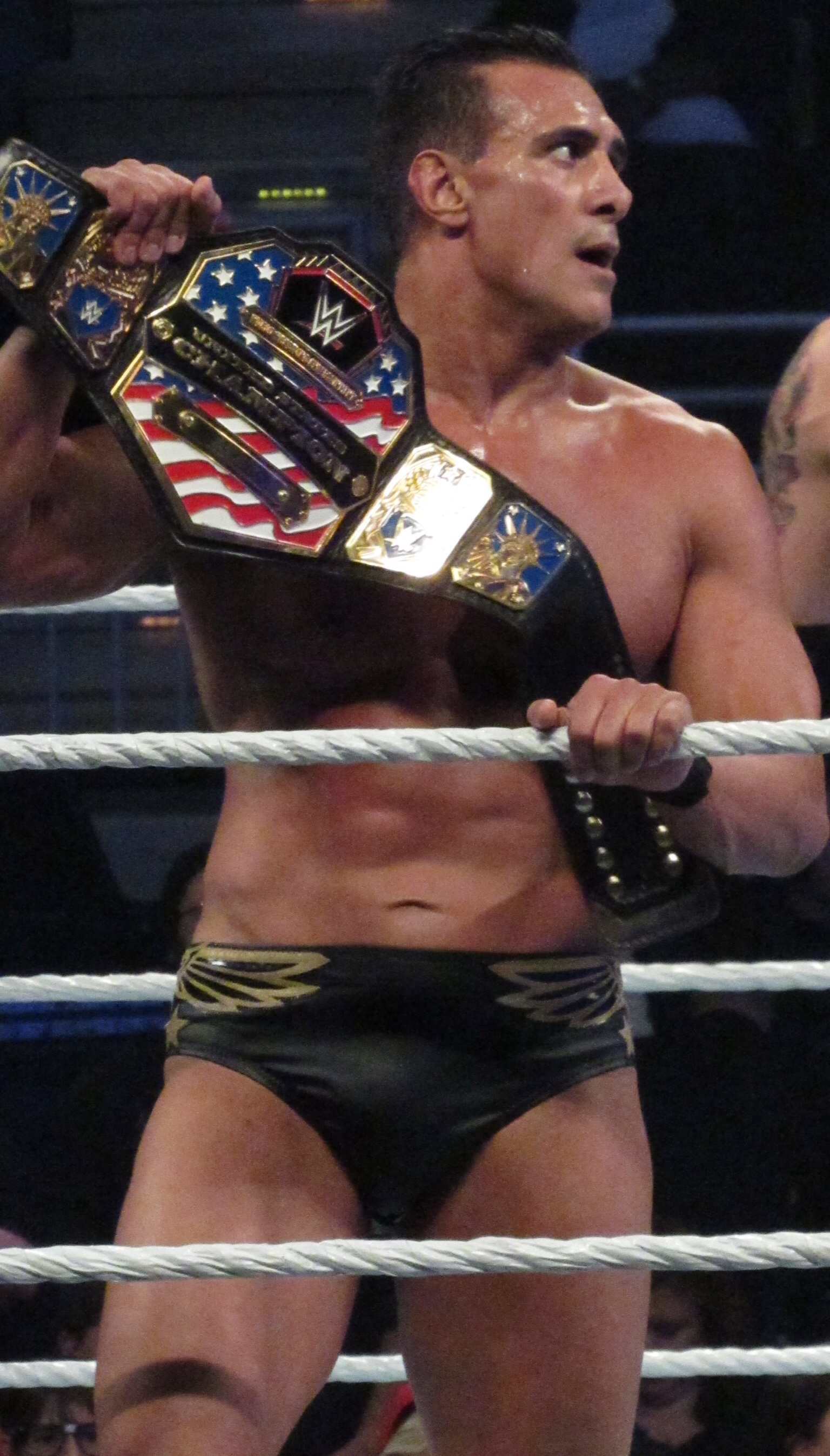
Del Rio is a two-time United States Champion

=== Amateur wrestling ===
- Central American and Caribbean Games
  - First place (3 times)
- World Junior Championships
  - Gold (1997)

=== Professional wrestling ===
- Alianza Universal De Lucha Libre
  - Copa Universo (2019) – with LA Park
- Big League Wrestling
  - BLW World Heavyweight Championship (1 time)
- Bologna Wrestling Team
  - BTW/WrestlingMegastar Championship (1 time)
- Consejo Mundial de Lucha Libre
  - CMLL World Heavyweight Championship (1 time)
  - La Copa Junior (2006)
- Global Force Wrestling
  - Impact Wrestling World Heavyweight Championship (1 time)
  - GFW Global Championship (1 time)
- Lucha Libre AAA Worldwide
  - AAA Mega Championship (2 times)
  - Lucha Libre World Cup (2015) – with Myzteziz and Rey Mysterio Jr.
  - Técnico of the Year (2014)
- New Generation Championship Wrestling
  - NGCW Heavyweight Championship (1 time)
- Pro Wrestling Illustrated
  - Ranked No. 6 of the top 500 singles wrestlers in the PWI 500 in 2011
- Qatar Pro Wrestling
  - QPW World Championship (1 time)
- World Association of Wrestling
  - WAW Undisputed World Heavyweight Championship (1 time)
- World Wrestling Entertainment/WWE
  - WWE Championship (2 times)
  - World Heavyweight Championship (2 times)
  - WWE United States Championship (2 times)
  - Bragging Rights Trophy (2010) – with Team SmackDown (Big Show, Rey Mysterio, Jack Swagger, Edge, Tyler Reks, and Kofi Kingston)
  - Money in the Bank (Raw 2011)
  - Royal Rumble (2011)
- World Wrestling League
  - WWL World Heavyweight Championship (1 time)
- Wrestling Observer Newsletter
  - Best Gimmick (2010)

== Mixed martial arts record ==
Professional record breakdown
15 matches	9 wins	6 losses
By knockout	3	2
By submission	6	2
By decision	0	1
By disqualification	0	1

Res.	Record	Opponent	Method	Event	Date	Round	Time	Location	Notes
Loss	9–6	Tito Ortiz	Submission (rear-naked choke)	Combate 51	7 December 2019	1	3:10	Hidalgo, Texas, United States	Catchweight (210 lb) bout.
Loss	9–5	Yamamoto Hanshi	TKO (punches)	Cage of Combat 4	27 February 2010	2	2:47	Madrid, Spain	
Win	9–4	Arthur Bart	KO (head kick)	Cage of Combat 3	13 February 2010	1	3:51	Torreón, Mexico	
Win	8–4	Toshiyuki Moriya	Submission (neck crank)	Cage of Combat 1	26 December 2009	1	3:17	Veracruz, Mexico	
Win	7–4	Ignacio Laguna	Submission (rear-naked choke)	Berkman MMA Promotions 1	15 December 2008	2	2:36	Mexico City, Mexico	
Win	6–4	Hato Kiyoshi	Submission (rear-naked choke)	MMA Xtreme 17	15 December 2007	2	2:31	Tegucigalpa, Honduras	
Win	5–4	Joao Tua	Submission (guillotine choke)	MMA Xtreme 14	13 October 2007	1	2:41	Tegucigalpa, Honduras	
Win	4–4	George King	Submission (rear-naked choke)	Vale Tudo Fighters Extreme: Mexico	27 May 2007	1	4:00	Tláhuac, Mexico	
Loss	3–4	Kazuhiro Nakamura	Decision (unanimous)	Pride 27	1 February 2004	3	5:00	Osaka, Japan	
Loss	3–3	Mirko Cro Cop	KO (head kick)	Pride Bushido 1	5 October 2003	1	0:46	Saitama, Japan	Heavyweight debut.
Win	3–2	Brad Kohler	TKO (shoulder injury)	Deep: 12th Impact	15 September 2003	1	1:25	Tokyo, Japan	
Loss	2–2	Hiroyuki Ito	DQ (grabbing the ropes)	DEEP 9 Impact	5 May 2003	1	3:21	Tokyo, Japan	
Win	2–1	Tatsuaki Nakano	Submission (rear-naked choke)	DEEP 6 Impact	7 September 2002	1	4:05	Tokyo, Japan	
Loss	1–1	Kengo Watanabe	Submission (rear-naked choke)	DEEP 4 Impact	30 March 2002	2	3:52	Nagoya, Japan	
Win	1–0	Kengo Watanabe	TKO (broken arm)	DEEP 2 Impact	18 August 2001	1	0:50	Yokohama, Japan	Openweight debut.

== Luchas de Apuestas record ==
Winner (wager)	Loser (wager)	Location	Event	Date	Notes
Dos Caras Jr. (mask)	Darketo (mask)	Aguascalientes, Aguascalientes	Live event	6 March 2003	
El Patrón Alberto (hair)	Brian Cage (hair)	Mexico City	Triplemanía XXIII	9 August 2015	

== See also ==
- List of professional wrestlers by MMA record

Preceded by Edge	Royal Rumble winner 2011	Succeeded by Sheamus
Preceded by Jack Swagger; Kane (WHC); The Miz (WWEC)	Mr. Money in the Bank; 2011 (WWEC); With: Daniel Bryan (WHC)	Succeeded by Dolph Ziggler (WHC); John Cena (WWEC)
