= Lucha Libre World Cup (2015) =

Professional Mexican wrestling event

- Official poster for the tournament
- Promotion: Lucha Libre AAA Worldwide
- Date: May 24, 2015
- City: Mexico City, Mexico
- Venue: Palacio de los Deportes
- Attendance: 17,000

Event chronology
← Previous; Rey de Reyes	Next → Verano de Escándalo

Lucha Libre World Cup chronology
← Previous; First	Next → 2016

The Lucha Libre World Cup (2015) was a professional wrestling event and tournament organized by Mexican professional wrestling promotion Lucha Libre AAA Worldwide (AAA) with the financial backing of the Grupo Modelo brewery, with Victoria Beer as the official sponsor. The tournament included a number of three-man tag teams, referred to as trios in Lucha Libre, two of which represented AAA itself, another team from outside AAA to represent Mexico as well as teams representing Total Nonstop Action Wrestling (TNA), Lucha Underground, Ring of Honor (ROH), All Japan Pro Wrestling (AJPW) and Pro Wrestling Noah as well as an "International team". The tournament was originally announced as "Copa Victoria", but later rebranded as the "Lucha Libre World Cup".

== Background ==
The event featured eight professional wrestling matches, in which some wrestlers may have been involved in pre-existing scripted feuds or storylines and others were matched up with no back story outside of the tournament. Wrestlers themselves portrayed either villains (referred to as "Rudos" in Mexico) or fan favorites ("Tecnicos" in Mexico) as they competed in matches with pre-determined outcomes. AAA originally announced that together with Grupo Modelo, specifically "Victorian Beer", to arrange "Copa Victoria", a trios tournament with teams from around the world competing in a one night tournament. At the time of the announcement AAA revealed that the first team to represent AAA would be the team of Alberto el Patron (team captain), Myzteziz and Rey Mysterio Jr. In late April it was announced that former AAA regular Kenzo Suzuki would captain a team representing All Japan Pro Wrestling (AJPW) that would also include Tiger Mask III and Masamune. In addition former holder of the AAA World Tag Team Championship, Taiji Ishimori, would captain a team representing Pro Wrestling Noah consisting of himself, Yoshihiro Takayama and Atsushi Kotoge. It was also announced that Matt Hardy would captain the team representing the U.S. based Total Nonstop Action and Lucha Underground. The other two team members would be Mr. Anderson (TNA) and Johnny Mundo (LU). AAA also invited their rival promotion Consejo Mundial de Lucha Libre (CMLL) to take part in the tournament, but they declined the offer. AAA announced that they would hold qualifiers to determine the second team representing AAA, with the winners of three qualifying matches earning the right to represent AAA. Fênix, Electroshock and El Hijo del Fantasma; La Parka, El Texano Jr. and Cibernético took place on April 30 with Psycho Clown, El Zorro and Averno to took place May 2. Winning their respective matches, El Hijo del Fantasma, El Texano Jr. Psycho Clown became members of the second AAA team. It has also been revealed that Blue Demon Jr., Dr. Wagner Jr. and El Solar would represent Mexico. The team called "The Rest of the World" would be represented by the Scottish Drew Galloway, Puerto Rican El Mesías and Angélico from South Africa.

== Tournament rules ==
AAA vice president Dorian Roldán explained the rules in a video uploaded to AAA's official YouTube channel. The tournament would consist of trios matches structured in quarterfinals, semi-finals and a final, plus an extra match to determine the third place. The bouts are slated to have a 15-minute time limit. If the time limit is reached without a clear winner, each of the participating teams selects one member, and the two picked wrestlers face off in a 5-minute sudden death in which the winning wrestler gets the victory for his team. There will be as many sudden deaths as necessary to determine a victor.

== Teams ==
Team	Team member
Dream Team	El Patrón Alberto (Captain)
Dream Team	Myzteziz
Dream Team	Rey Mysterio Jr.
Team AAA	El Hijo del Fantasma
Team AAA	El Texano Jr.
Team AAA	Psycho Clown
Team MexLeyendas	Blue Demon Jr.
Team MexLeyendas	Dr. Wagner Jr.
Team MexLeyendas	El Solar
Team "Rest of the World"	Drew Galloway
Team "Rest of the World"	Angélico
Team "Rest of the World"	El Mesías
Team TNA/Lucha Underground	Matt Hardy (Captain)
Team TNA/Lucha Underground	Mr. Anderson
Team TNA/Lucha Underground	Johnny Mundo
Team ROH/Lucha Underground	Moose
Team ROH/Lucha Underground	A. C. H.
Team ROH/Lucha Underground	Brian Cage
Team Noah	Taiji Ishimori (Captain)
Team Noah	Yoshihiro Takayama
Team Noah	Atsushi Kotoge
Team AJPW	Kenzo Suzuki (Captain)
Team AJPW	Tiger Mask III
Team AJPW	Masamune

Other on-screen personnel
Role:	Name:
Spanish commentary	Leo Riano
Spanish commentary	Adolfo Morales
Spanish commentary	Hugo Savinovich
English commentary	Matt Striker
English commentary	Vampiro
English commentary	Jeff Jarrett (semi-finals)
Ring announcer	Jesus Zuniga
Judges	El Fantasma
Judges	Dos Caras
Judges	El Canek
Judges	Arturo Rivera
Judges	Villano IV
Judges	Villano V
Judges	Cien Caras
Judges	Máscara Año 2000
Judges	Universo 2000

== Tournament bracket ==
1st Round; Victoria Lucha Libre World Cup; May 24, 2015
Dream Team	Submission
Team Noah	—
Team AAA	—
Team ROH/Lucha Underground	Pinfall
Team AJPW	—
Team MexLeyendas	Submission
Team Rest of the World	—
Team TNA/Lucha Underground	Pinfall

Semifinals; Victoria Lucha Libre World Cup; May 24, 2015
Dream Team	Submission
Team ROH/Lucha Underground	—
Team MexLeyendas	—
Team TNA/Lucha Underground	Pinfall

Final; Victoria Lucha Libre World Cup; May 24, 2015
Dream Team	Pinfall
Team TNA/Lucha Underground	—
3rd Place
Team ROH/Lucha Underground	Pinfall
Team MexLeyendas	—

== Results ==
No.	Results	Stipulations	Times
1	Dream Team (El Patrón Alberto, Myzteziz, and Rey Mysterio Jr.) defeated Team Noah (Taiji Ishimori, Atsushi Kotoge, and Yoshihiro Takayama)	Lucha Libre World Cup first round trios match	—
2	Team AAA (El Hijo del Fantasma, El Texano Jr., and Psycho Clown) vs. Team ROH/Lucha Underground (Moose, A. C. H., and Brian Cage ended in a time-limit draw	Lucha Libre World Cup first round trios match	15:00
3	Brian Cage (Team ROH/Lucha Underground) defeated El Texano Jr. (Team AAA)	Sudden death singles match	—
4	Team MexLeyendas (Blue Demon Jr., Dr. Wagner Jr., and El Solar) defeated Team AJPW (Kenzo Suzuki, Masamune, and Tiger Mask III)	Lucha Libre World Cup first round trios match	—
5	Team Rest of the World (Angélico, Drew Galloway, and El Mesías) vs. Team TNA/Lucha Underground (Matt Hardy, Johnny Mundo, and Mr. Anderson) ended in a time-limit draw	Lucha Libre World Cup first round trios match	15:00
6	Johnny Mundo (Team TNA/Lucha Underground) defeated Drew Galloway (Team Rest of the World)	Sudden death singles match	—
7	Dream Team (El Patrón Alberto, Myzteziz, and Rey Mysterio Jr.) defeated Team ROH/Lucha Underground (Moose, A. C. H., and Brian Cage	Lucha Libre World Cup semifinal trios match	—
8	Team TNA/Lucha Underground (Matt Hardy, Johnny Mundo, and Mr. Anderson) defeated Team MexLeyendas (Blue Demon Jr., Dr. Wagner Jr., and El Solar)	Lucha Libre World Cup semifinal trios match	—
9	A. C. H. (Team ROH/Lucha Underground) vs. Blue Demon Jr. (Team MexLeyendas) ended in a time-limit draw	Singles match for third place in the Lucha Libre World Cup	5:00
10	Brian Cage (Team ROH/Lucha Underground) defeated Dr. Wagner Jr. (Team MexLeyendas)	Sudden death singles match	—
11	Dream Team (El Patrón Alberto, Myzteziz, and Rey Mysterio Jr.) vs. Team TNA/Lucha Underground (Matt Hardy, Johnny Mundo, and Mr. Anderson) ended in a time-limit draw	Lucha Libre World Cup final trios match	15:00
12	Mr. Anderson (Team TNA/Lucha Underground) vs. Myzteziz (Dream Team) ended in a time-limit draw	Sudden death singles match	5:00
13	El Patrón Alberto (Dream Team) vs. Matt Hardy (Team TNA/Lucha Underground) ended in a time-limit draw	Sudden death singles match	5:00
14	Rey Mysterio Jr. (Dream Team) defeated Johnny Mundo (Team TNA/Lucha Underground)	Sudden death singles match	4:50

== Aftermath ==
At the press conference after the show Rey Mysterio dedicated the victory to Perro Aguayo Jr. who had died a few weeks earlier after an accident during a match where he wrestled against Rey Mysterio. Following the event it was announced that Dr. Wagner Jr. had suffered a "Second degree cervical sprain" from the finish of the 3rd place match and would be unable to wrestle for 20 to 25 days. Dr. Wagner Jr. would wrestle the following Friday on a show in Tijuana.

== Reception ==
Apolo Valdés, who writes about lucha libre on the sports website MedioTiempo rated the show as an 8.5 out of 10, noting that while the winning team was predictable the matches were very entertaining. He also hope that some of the competitors would return to AAA at a future date, listing ACH, Drew Galloway, Masamune, Matt Hardy and Johnny Mundo as those he would like to see at future AAA events. Josh Boutwell, who writes a weekly Lucha column for wrestleview stated that the event had a very special atmosphere, making it feel like a SuperBowl level event for AAA. He cited the semi-final match between the Dream Team and Team ROH/LU as the best match of the night. His biggest complaints related to the feed, especially on the English language feed and gave the show itself an "A". Rob Barry of "Voices of Wrestling", which regularly covers Lucha Libre had a very different take on the show, calling it "a new leader for worst show of the year", citing the English commentary and the refereeing as particularly bad and that the show dragged on.

== Awards ==
At final of the event, before the podium medals were given to its respective winners, there was given awards to some wrestlers. Judging panel gave "Wrestler of the Night" award to Rey Mysterio Jr., "Dive of the Night" award to Angélico, and "Match of the Night" award to bout contested between Dream Team and Team ROH/Lucha Underground.
