= Destination X (2017) =

2017 professional wrestling event

- Promotion: Global Force Wrestling
- Date: August 17, 2017
- City: Orlando, Florida
- Venue: Impact Zone
- Tagline: Live and Free on Pop TV

Destination X chronology
← Previous; 2016	Next → 2026

Impact! special episodes chronology
← Previous; Genesis	Next → Victory Road

Destination X (2017) (aka Impact!: Destination X) was a professional wrestling event produced by Global Force Wrestling (GFW) promotion, which took place on August 17, 2017, at the Impact Zone in Orlando, Florida. It was the thirteenth event under the Destination X chronology. It was featured as a live special edition of GFW's weekly broadcast of Impact! and, until 2026, was the final event under the Destination X name.

Five professional wrestling matches were contested at the event. The main event featured Matt Sydal defeating Lashley, with the winner earning a title shot at any GFW championship of his choice. On the undercard, Sonjay Dutt retained the X Division Championship against Trevor Lee in a ladder match and Sienna retained the Knockouts Championship against Gail Kim. The final round of the Super X Cup Tournament took place at the event, in which Dezmond Xavier defeated Taiji Ishimori to win the tournament and Ohio Versus Everything (Dave Crist and Jake Crist) made their GFW debut at the event. The event also marked the returns of Jim Cornette, Petey Williams and Taryn Terrell to GFW.

== Storylines ==
=== Main event match ===
On the July 20 episode of Impact!, Matt Sydal demanded a title shot after defeating Low Ki and El Hijo del Fantasma in a three-way match. However, Lashley interrupted Sydal and demanded a title shot of his own and then both men insulted each other on mic, leading to Lashley attacking Sydal. On the July 27 episode of Impact!, Lashley demanded that executive Bruce Prichard give him a title shot at Destination X. However, Sydal interrupted Lashley and attacked him as retribution for the previous week. On July 28, it was announced that Lashley would compete against Sydal in a match at Destination X, with the winner getting a title shot of his choice.

=== Undercard matches ===
At Slammiversary XV, the GFW Women's Champion Sienna defeated the Impact Knockouts Champion Rosemary in a title unification match to unify both titles and create the Unified Knockouts Championship. Sienna began demanding respect and confronted Karen Jarrett on the July 20 episode of Impact!, demanding Jarrett to show her respect and acknowledge her as the most dominant wrestler in GFW's Knockouts division ever. This came to a head on the August 10 episode of Impact!, where Jarrett announced that Sienna would defend the title against Gail Kim at Destination X.

On July 4, it was announced that the Super X Cup would return to GFW after a twelve-year absence, the last edition being held in 2005, and the 2017 edition would begin on the July 6 episode of Impact!. The eight participants announced for the tournament were: Dezmond Xavier, Davey Richards and Andrew Everett representing GFW, with Idris Abraham representing original GFW and the Can-Am Wrestling School, ACH representing All American Wrestling, Drago representing Lucha Libre AAA Worldwide, Sammy Guevara representing Wrestle Circus and Taiji Ishimori representing Pro Wrestling Noah. Ishimori and Xavier qualified for the tournament final, setting up a match between the two in the final of Super X Cup at Destination X.

On the July 6 episode of Impact!, Trevor Lee attacked Sonjay Dutt after the latter defeated Caleb Konley and stole Dutt's the X Division Championship belt, proclaiming himself to be the next X Division Champion. Dutt attacked Lee the following week on Impact!, and then Bruce Prichard banned Dutt from the Impact Zone. On the August 3 episode of Impact!, Dutt defeated Lee under a disguise as the masked Mumbai Cat. After the match, Dutt challenged Lee to a ladder match for the X Division Championship at Destination X until he was escorted out of the arena by security guards on Prichard's orders. On the August 10 episode of Impact!, the match was made official for Destination X.

On July 27, vignettes began airing on Impact!, hyping the debut of Crist Brothers (Dave Crist and Jake Crist) as a tag team called Ohio Versus Everything (oVe). The following week, on Impact!, it was announced that oVe would make its GFW debut at Destination X.

=== Cancelled match ===
At Slammiversary XV, the GFW Global Champion Alberto El Patron defeated Lashley to win the Impact World Championship in a title unification match to unify both titles, thus creating the Unified World Championship. On the July 6 episode of Impact!, Latin American Exchange interfered in a rematch between Patron and Lashley for the title and Konnan attacked Lashley, causing Patron to get disqualified. Konnan and LAX dragged Patron out of the ring to the backstage after the match. The following week, on Impact!, Konnan offered Patron to join LAX but Patron declined the offer, leading to Konnan directing LAX to attack Patron until Lashley made the save. Later that night, Patron and Lashley defeated LAX members Santana and Ortiz, but LAX attacked Patron after the match. On the July 20 episode of Impact!, LAX interrupted Patron's father Dos Caras and brother El Hijo de Dos Caras, while they were being interviewed for a documentary on Patron. LAX attacked them until Patron made the save. On the August 3 episode of Impact!, Low Ki interrupted a six-man tag team match pitting Patron and his family against the LAX trio of Homicide, Santana and Ortiz. Ki attacked Patron, causing his team to lose the match. After the match, Ki revealed himself as the newest member of LAX and raised Patron's Unified World Championship title belts. On the August 10 episode of Impact!, it was announced that Patron would defend the title against Ki at Destination X. However, the status of the match remained in question after El Patron was suspended by GFW due to a domestic violence allegation by his girlfriend Paige. As a result, on August 14, GFW stripped Patron off the Unified World Championship, thus cancelling his scheduled Destination X match against Ki.

== Event ==
=== Preliminary matches ===
The event kicked off with Sienna defending the Unified Knockouts Championship against Gail Kim. Kim nailed an Eat Defeat to Sienna but KM distracted the referee and Kim knocked off KM from the apron, which allowed Taryn Terrell to hit a Taryn Cutter to Kim. Sienna then nailed an AK47 to Kim to retain the title.

After the match, the executive Bruce Prichard declared that he would be awarding the vacant Unified World Championship to Lashley. However, Jim Cornette came out to announce that he was the new executive and fired Prichard and then decided that a Gauntlet for the Gold would take place for the vacant title on the following week's Impact!.

Next, the final round of the 2017 Super X Cup tournament took place between Dezmond Xavier and Taiji Ishimori. Ishimori nailed a 450° splash to Xavier for a near-fall and then Xavier nailed a Jocay-le to Ishimori to win the tournament.

Next, Sonjay Dutt defended the X Division Championship against Trevor Lee in a ladder match. Caleb Konley interfered in the match on Lee's behalf while Dutt was climbing the ladder to retrieve the title belt and attacked Konley until Petey Williams made his return to GFW and delivered a Canadian Destroyer to Konley, allowing Dutt to knock Lee off the ladder and retrieve the title belt to retain the title.

In the penultimate match of the event, Ohio Versus Everything (Dave Crist and Jake Crist) made their GFW debut against enhancement talents Jason Cade and Zachary Wentz. oVe knocked out Cade with the high low kick for the win.

=== Main event match ===
In the main event, Matt Sydal took on Lashley in which the winner would get a GFW title shot of his choosing. Lashley blocked a shooting star press by Sydal by raising his knees up and attempted to hit a spear but Sydal sidestepped it and rolled him up for the win.

== Reception ==
Larry Csonka of 411 Mania gave a rating of 5.5 to Destination X, considering "the card was good on paper, even with losing the GFW title match" and criticized GFW on reversion to "interference in title matches, old names returning, and some sort of authority figure/power struggle angle." According to him, "the matches greatly under delivered, mostly average, especially the X-division matches." He thought that Destination X "had a ton of potential," but "failed to deliver and felt like the usual poorly planned “reboot” style episode we get from the company. This wasn’t the best first step on the road to Bound for Glory; you have to do better when there's so much product out there to choose from."

== Aftermath ==
Eli Drake won the vacant Unified World Championship (renamed to GFW Global Championship) in a Gauntlet for the Gold match on the August 24 episode of Impact!. The following week, on Impact!, Jim Cornette announced that Matt Sydal would receive his earned title shot against Drake for the Global Championship on the September 7 episode of Impact!.

Petey Williams' interference in the X Division Championship match led to Williams making his in-ring return to Impact for the first time since 2009, defeating Caleb Konley on the August 31 episode of Impact!. Trevor Lee attacked Williams after the match until Sonjay Dutt made the save. The following week, on Impact!, Dutt and Williams defeated Lee and Konley in a tag team match. It led to a falls count anywhere match between Dutt and Lee for the X Division Championship on the September 14 episode of Impact!.

Taryn Terrell explained her betrayal of Gail Kim, saying that Kim never thanked or appreciated her for accompanying Kim during the latter's Hall of Fame induction and insulted her, saying that Kim cheated on her husband Robert Irvine and the Knockouts division, leading to Kim rushing to the ring to brawl with her. Allie confronted Terrell on her attitude towards Kim, leading to Terrell attacking her. On the September 7 episode of Impact!, Sienna and Terrell defeated Kim and Allie in a tag team match and continued to attack them after the match, until Rosemary made the save. Taya Valkyrie made her GFW debut and chased Sienna and Terrell away from the ring and then attacked Rosemary. The six Knockouts would feud with each other over the following weeks, leading to a six-Knockout tag team match being announced for Victory Road, pitting the team of Sienna, Terrell and Valkyrie against Kim, Allie and Rosemary.

Taiji Ishimori and Dezmond Xavier would compete in a Destination X rematch on the January 18, 2018 episode of Impact!, where Ishimori defended the X Division Championship against Xavier. Ishimori retained the title.

== Results ==
No.	Results	Stipulations	Times
1	Sienna (c) (with KM) defeated Gail Kim	Singles match for the GFW Knockouts Championship	07:02
2	Dezmond Xavier defeated Taiji Ishimori	2017 GFW Super X Cup Tournament Final	08:56
3	Sonjay Dutt (c) defeated Trevor Lee	Ladder match for the GFW X Division Championship	16:03
4	Ohio Versus Everything (Dave Crist and Jake Crist) defeated Jason Cade and Zachary Wentz	Tag team match	02:18
5	Matt Sydal defeated Lashley	Singles match where the winner gets a GFW title shot of his choosing	14:52
(c) / – the champion(s) heading into the match

=== Tournament bracket ===
First round Impact! July 3–5, 2017 (Aired July 6–27)
Dezmond Xavier	Pinfall
Idris Abraham	11:57
Drago	Pinfall
Sammy Guevara	4:38
A. C. H.	Pinfall
Andrew Everett	6:25
Davey Richards	8:30
Taiji Ishimori	Pinfall

Semifinals; Impact! July 5–6, 2017 (Aired August 3–10)
Dezmond Xavier	Pinfall
Drago	15:10
A. C. H.	10:07
Taiji Ishimori	Pinfall

Final; Impact!: Destination X August 17, 2017
Dezmond Xavier	Pinfall
Taiji Ishimori	8:56
