= War Dog Memorial =

War Dog Memorial may refer to:

- War Dog Memorial (Bristol Township, Pennsylvania), honoring US service dogs from all wars
- National War Dog Cemetery, memorial on Guam honoring US Marine service dogs from World War II
- Military Working Dog Teams National Monument, honoring US service dogs and their handlers for all 5 services since World War II
