= 2017 GFW Super X Cup Tournament =

2017 Global Force Wrestling tournament

- Venue: Impact Zone
- Location: Orlando, Florida
- Start date: July 16, 2017
- End date: August 17, 2017
- Competitors: A. C. H.; Andrew Everett; Davey Richards; Dezmond Xavier; Drago; Idris Abraham; Sammy Guevara; Taiji Ishimori

Champion
- Dezmond Xavier

The 2017 GFW Super X Cup Tournament is a professional wrestling single-elimination X Cup Tournament produced and unified with and by both Impact Wrestling's and Global Force Wrestling's professional wrestling promotion's and others. It is the first Super X Cup to be held since 2005, however in 2006 and 2008 TNA held team based World X Cup Tournaments. The tournament features eight X Division wrestlers: Dezmond Xavier, Davey Richards and Andrew Everett representing Global Force Wrestling; with Idris Abraham representing GFW and the Can-Am Wrestling School, A. C. H. representing AAW, Drago representing Lucha Libre AAA Worldwide, Sammy Guevara representing Wrestle Circus and Taiji Ishimori representing Pro Wrestling Noah.

The tournament final took place at Destination X special episode of Impact! on August 17, 2017, in which Dezmond Xavier defeated Taiji Ishimori to win the tournament.

== Background ==
The 2017 Impact Wrestling Super X Cup Tournament is a professional wrestling single-elimination X Cup Tournament produced by the Impact Wrestling promotion. It is the first Super X Cup to be held since 2005, however in 2006 and 2008 TNA held team based World X Cup Tournaments. The tournament features eight wrestlers: Dezmond Xavier, Davey Richards and Andrew Everett representing Global Force Wrestling; with Idris Abraham representing GFW and the Can-Am Wrestling School, ACH representing All American Wrestling, Drago representing Lucha Libre AAA Worldwide, Sammy Guevara representing Wrestle Circus and Taiji Ishimori representing Pro Wrestling Noah.

== Tournament bracket ==
First round Impact! July 3–5, 2017 (Aired July 6–27)
Dezmond Xavier	Pinfall
Idris Abraham	11:57
Drago	Pinfall
Sammy Guevara	4:38
A. C. H.	Pinfall
Andrew Everett	6:25
Davey Richards	8:30
Taiji Ishimori	Pinfall

Semifinals; Impact! July 5–6, 2017 (Aired August 3–10)
Dezmond Xavier	Pinfall
Drago	15:10
A. C. H.	10:07
Taiji Ishimori	Pinfall

Final; Impact!: Destination X August 17, 2017
Dezmond Xavier	Pinfall
Taiji Ishimori	8:56
