= War Dogs =

War Dogs, or wardog, or variant, may refer to:

== Art, entertainment, and media ==
=== Films ===
- War Dogs (1942 film), an American film directed by S. Roy Luby
- War Dogs (1943 film), an animated short subject by Hanna-Barbera
- War Dogs (2016 film), an American film directed by Todd Phillips

=== Literature ===
- War Dogs (novel) (2014), a science-fiction novel by Greg Bear

=== Video games ===
- Wardogs, an upcoming multiplayer first-person shooter

=== Fictional entities ===
- WARDOG, a fictional character from the videogame series SOCOM (series)
- The Wardogs, a fictional team from the videogame Manhunt (video game)

== Warfare ==
- Dogs in warfare, the use of dogs in combat
- Mercenaries, soldiers who take part in a conflict for personal gain

== Other uses ==
- Columbus Wardogs, defunct arena football (gridiron) team from Columbus, Georgia, USA

== See also ==
- The Dogs of War (disambiguation)
- War Dog Memorial (disambiguation)
