= Paula Slater =

American sculptor

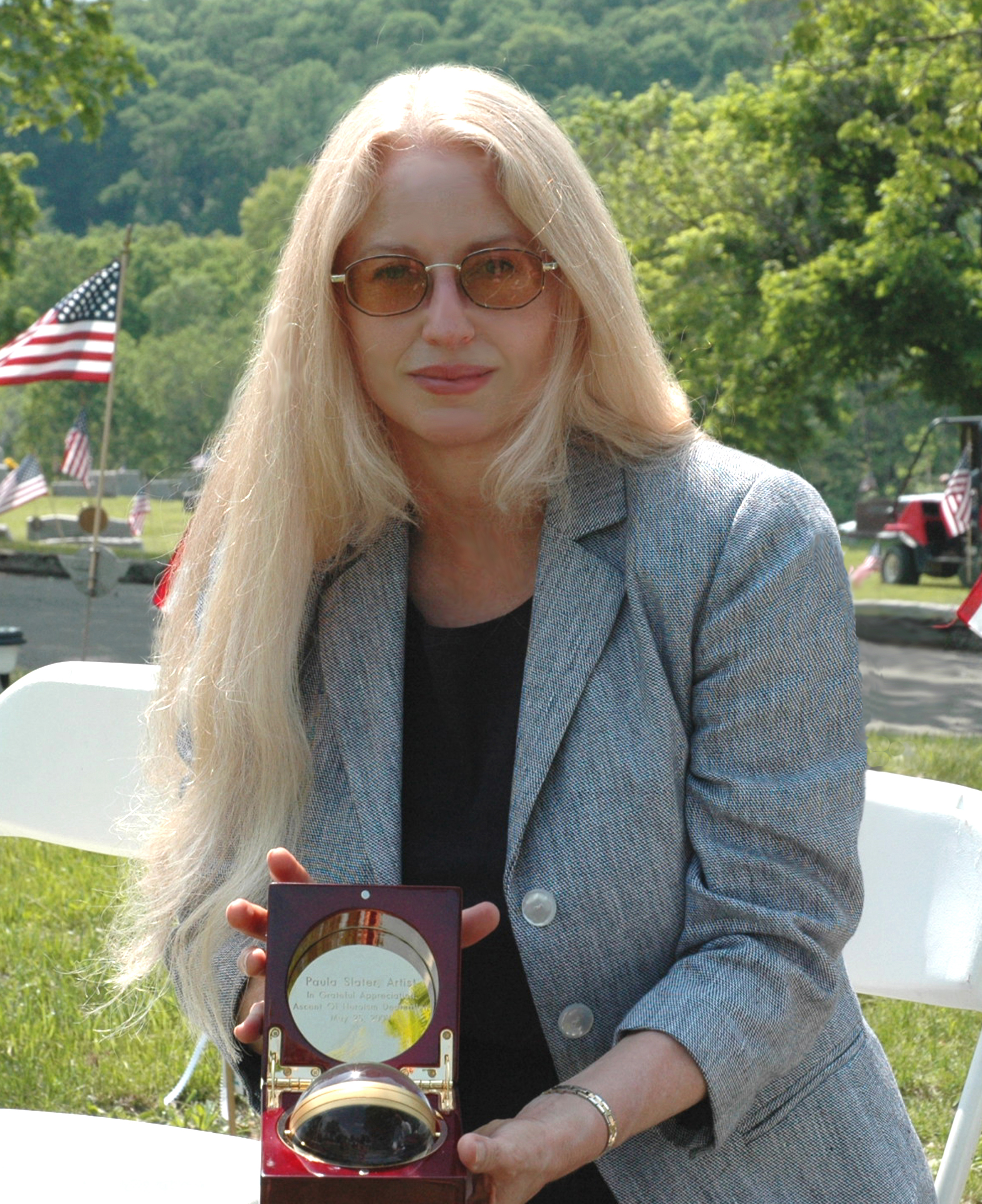
- Known for: U.S. Military Working Dog Teams National Monument
- Style: Sculpture
- Website: paulaslater.com

Paula Slater is an American sculptor.

Slater is a member of the National Sculpture Society, the National Museum of Women in the Arts and the Portrait Society of America.

== Early life and education ==
Born in Fullerton, California, she obtained her Associate of Arts degree in Fine Art from the Orange Coast College in 1973. In 1976, she obtained her Bachelor of Arts, followed by her Master of Arts degree in 1988 from California State University and John F. Kennedy University, respectively.

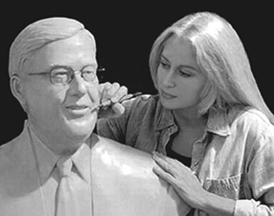
Congressman Bill Thomas clay bust in-progress. Bronze bust was placed at the William Thomas Airport Terminal, Bakersfield, California.

== Career ==
Slater works primarily in figurative bronze sculpture, creating realist monuments and portrait works that commemorate historical figures, military service, and civic subjects. She is most notable for her U.S. Military Working Dog Teams National Monument sculpture at Lackland Air Force Base in San Antonio, Texas (introduced to the United States Congress by Rep. Walter B. Jones and signed into law by George W. Bush), and for her public and privately commissioned busts and monuments.

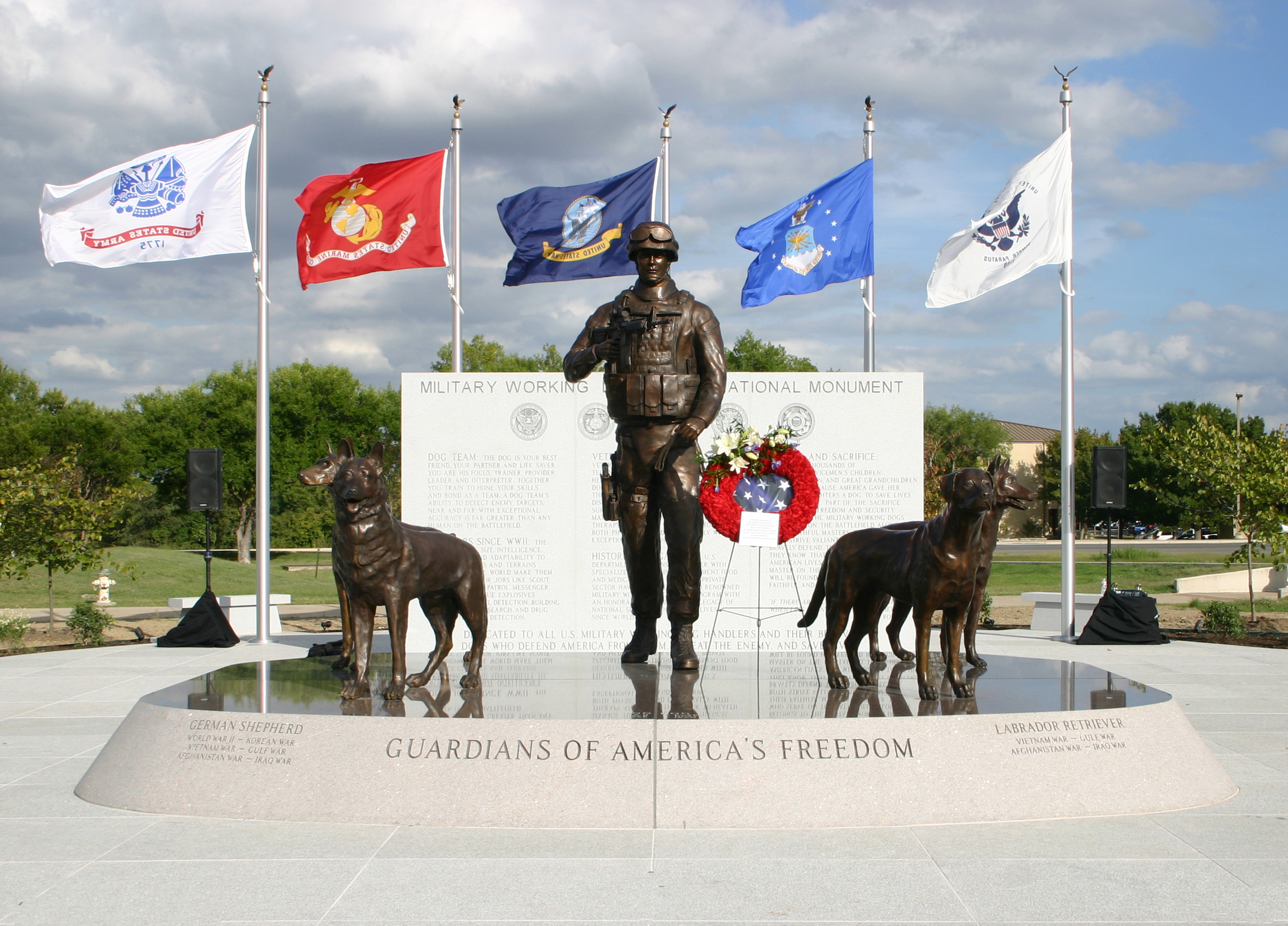
The U.S. Working Dog Teams National Monument.

She has been commissioned to sculpt several Congressmen and historical figures, such as Abraham Lincoln at the Abraham Lincoln Museum and Washington County Courthouse in Springfield, Kentucky, and Giulio Cesare Graziani in the Italian Air Force Museum in Rome.

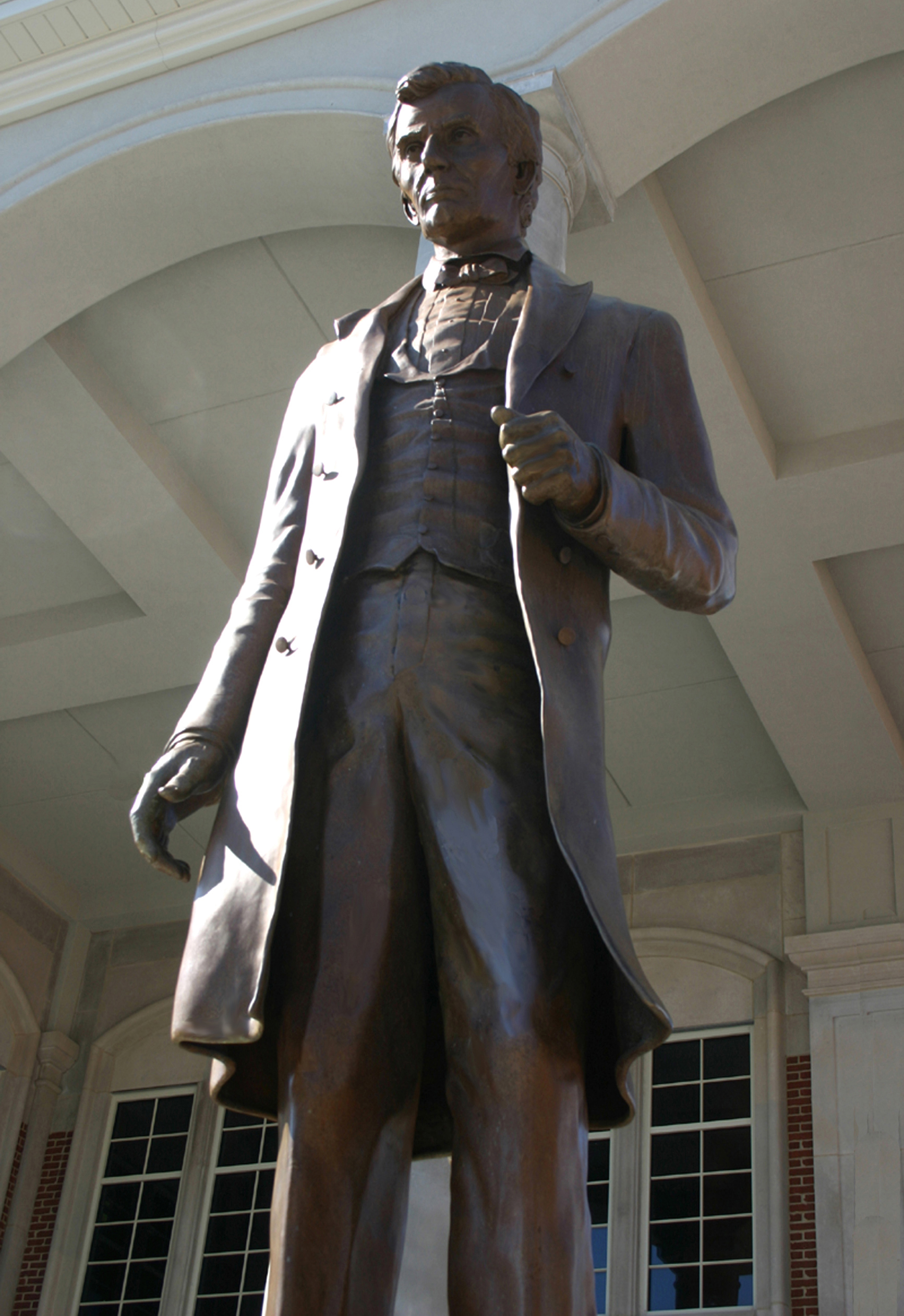
The Abraham Lincoln Monument, created by sculptor Paula Slater.

Among her works is the Port Huron Tunnel Explosion Memorial (2006), a bronze sculpture in Port Huron, Michigan, dedicated to workers who died in the 1971 tunnel disaster.

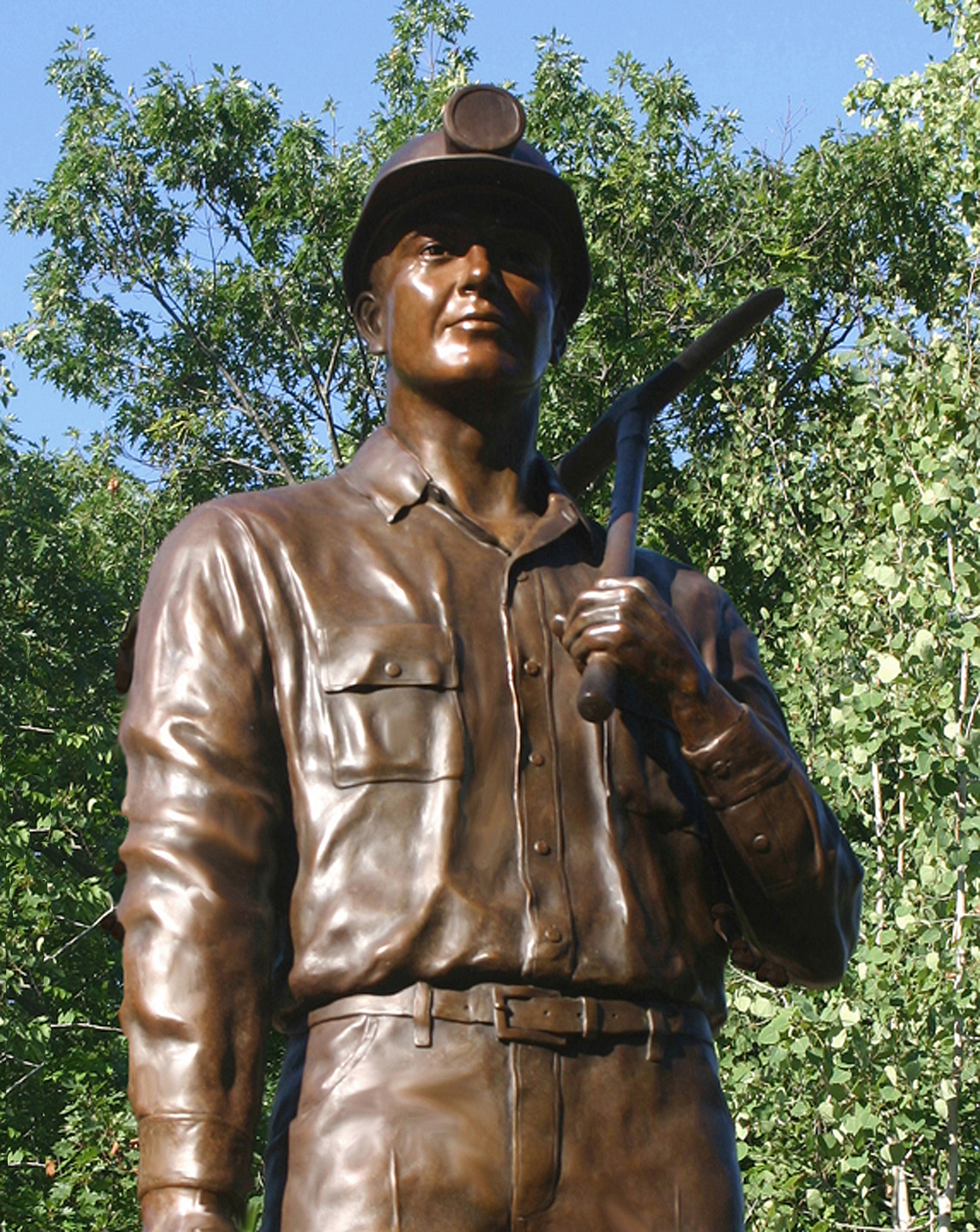
The Port Huron Mining Memorial.

In 2009, Slater completed The Ascent of Heroism, a bronze veterans memorial in Altoona, Pennsylvania, depicting seven military figures representing American conflicts from the Revolutionary War to the Iraq War in a symbolic ascending composition honoring the sacrifice and service of veterans.

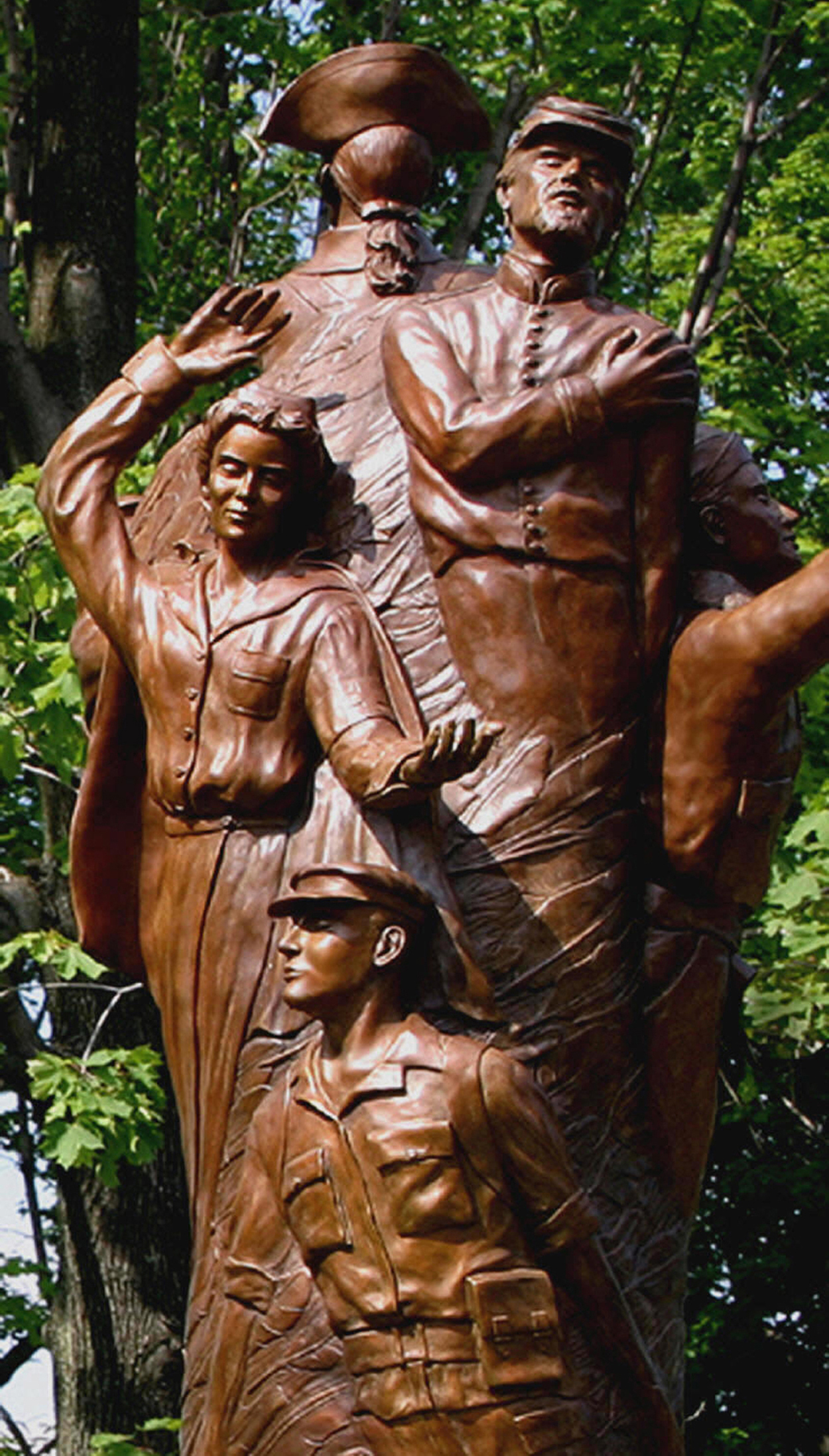
The Ascent of Heroism.

In 2016, Slater completed the General Vang Pao Monument, a 10-foot-high bronze sculpture installed at the San Joaquin County Fairgrounds in Stockton, California, honoring the Hmong military leader General Vang Pao. The monument was unveiled on March 28, 2016 and includes bronze relief panels depicting his life and legacy.

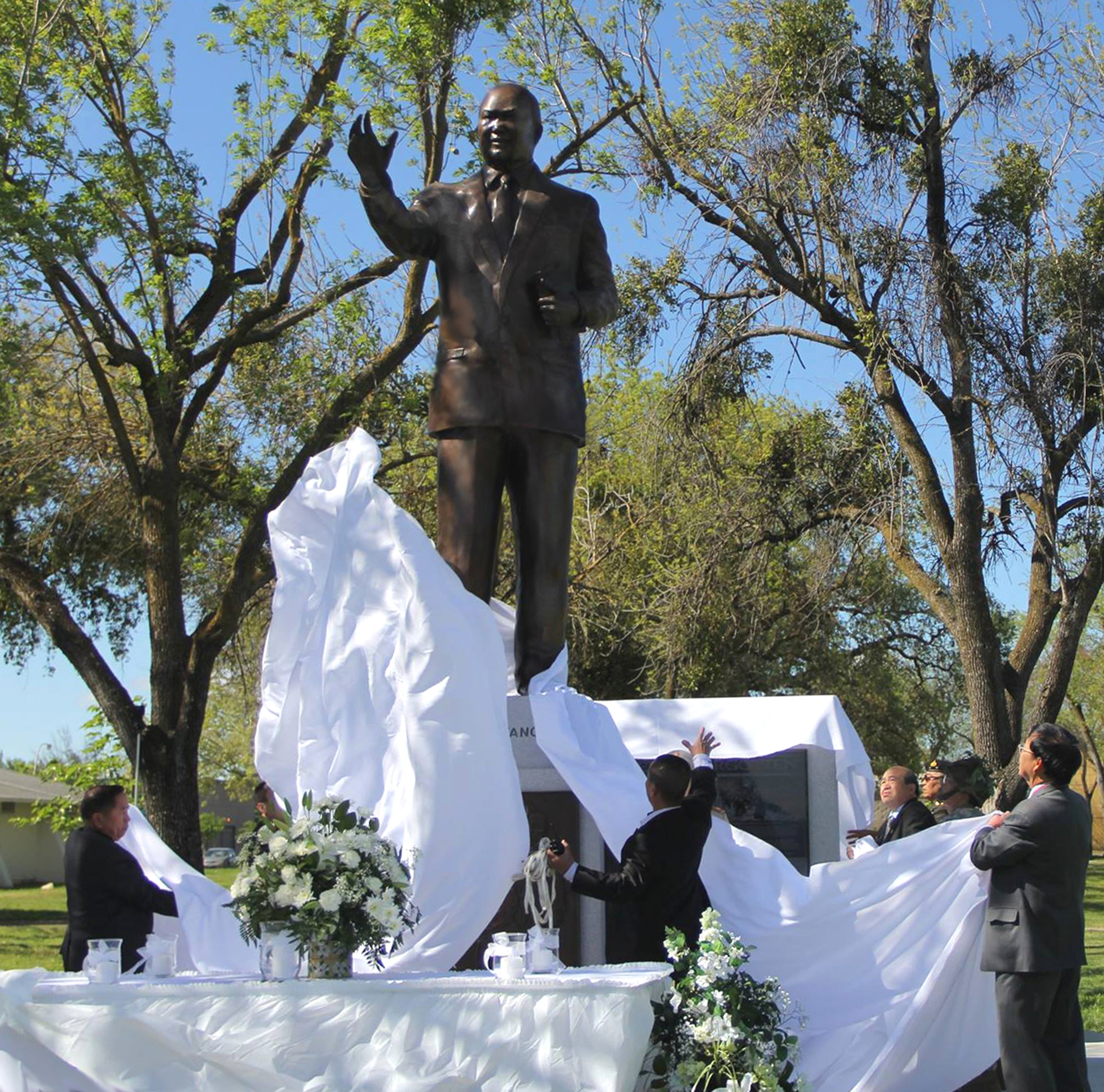
The General Vang Pao Monument.

She also created a bronze monument of General Ulysses S. Grant for the United States Military Academy at West Point, New York.

She also created a bronze monument of General Ulysses S. Grant for the United States Military Academy at West Point, New York.

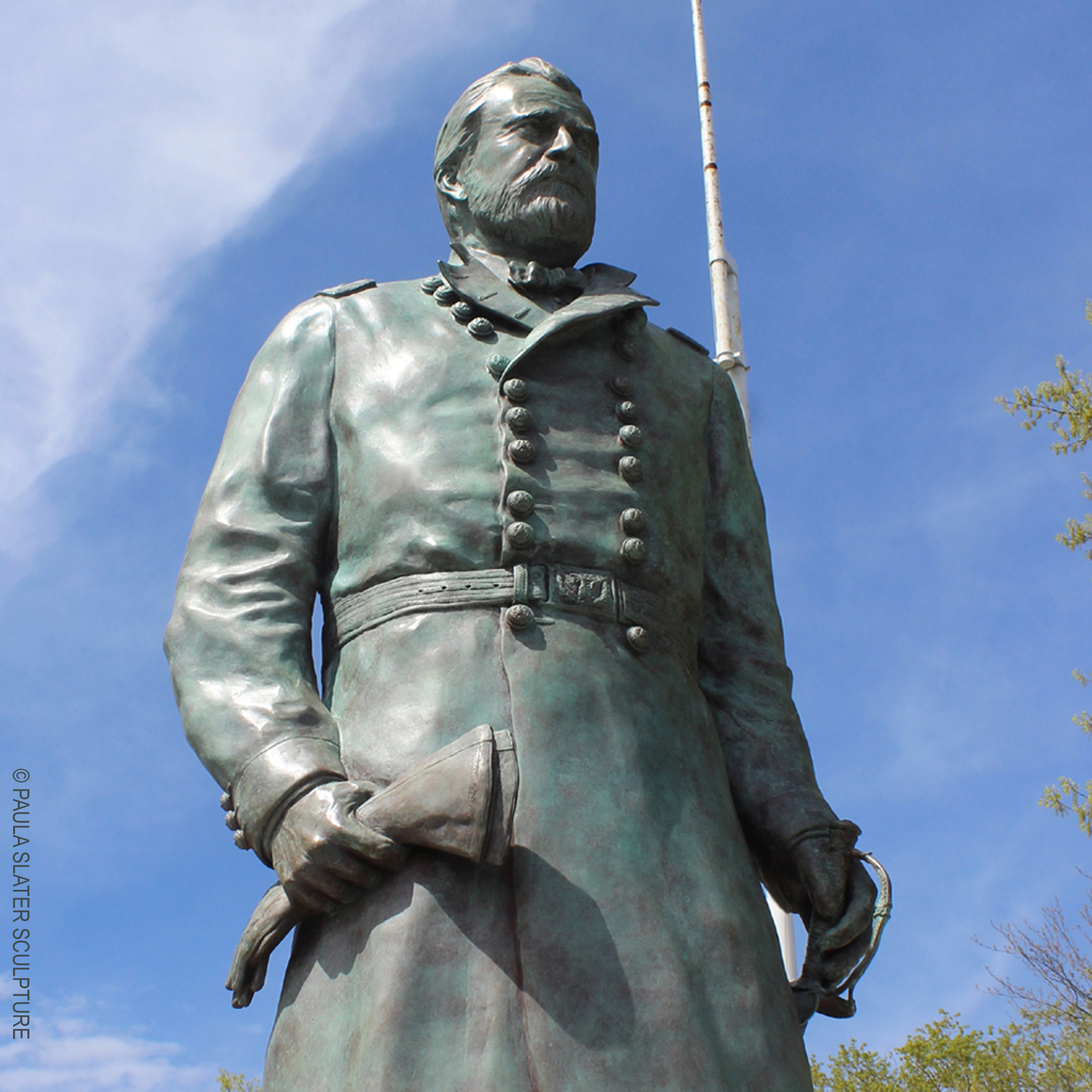
Cropped view of the General Grant Monument.

In 2022, Slater created My Faithful Warrior, a 1.3‑times‑life‑size bronze monument installed at the National Vietnam War Museum in Weatherford, Texas, honoring the nearly 4,000 military working dogs that served during the Vietnam War.

Slater contributed to the creation of fifteen Neil Armstrong Apollo 11 spacesuit replicas for the National Air and Space Museum, displayed at Major League Baseball stadiums nationwide during the 50th anniversary of the Apollo 11 Moon landing.

Neil Armstrong Apollo 11 Spacesuit

She also sculpted public art portraits of Canton mayor Stanley A. Cmich and federal judge Leroy John Contie Jr., installed in the renovated City Plaza in downtown Canton. Slater is also the master sculptor behind the Don Salvio Pacheco Monument in Concord, CA.

Mayor Stanley A. Cmich Bronze Bust

Judge Leroy Contie Bronze Bust

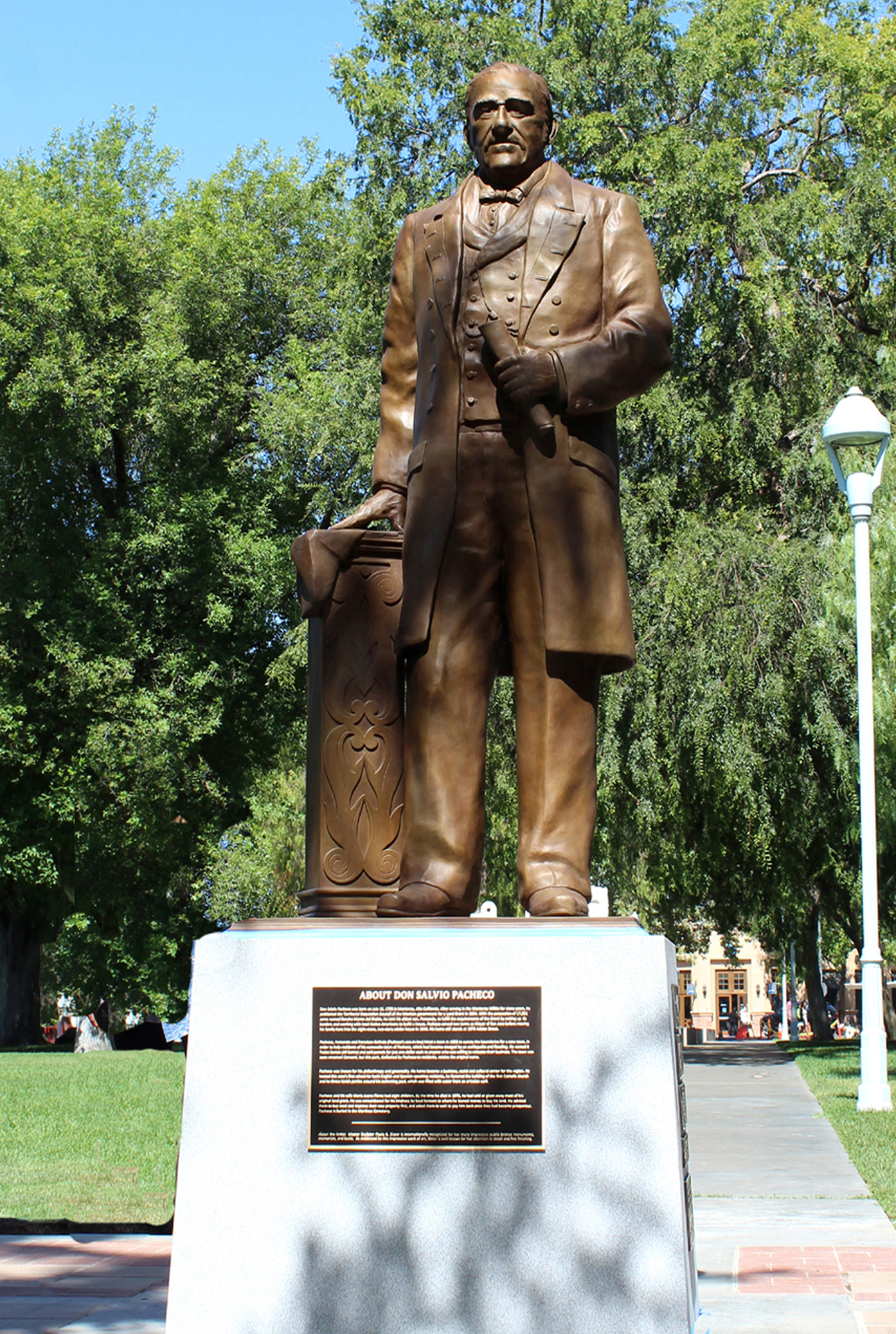
The Don Salvio Pacheco Monument.

Other of her works include the monument honoring Steven Stayner in Merced, California, sculptures of Sohrab Aarabi and Neda Agha-Soltan in San Francisco, the General Ulysses S. Grant Monument (2019) at the United States Military Academy, West Point, and the Mahsa Jina Amini bronze bust (2025).

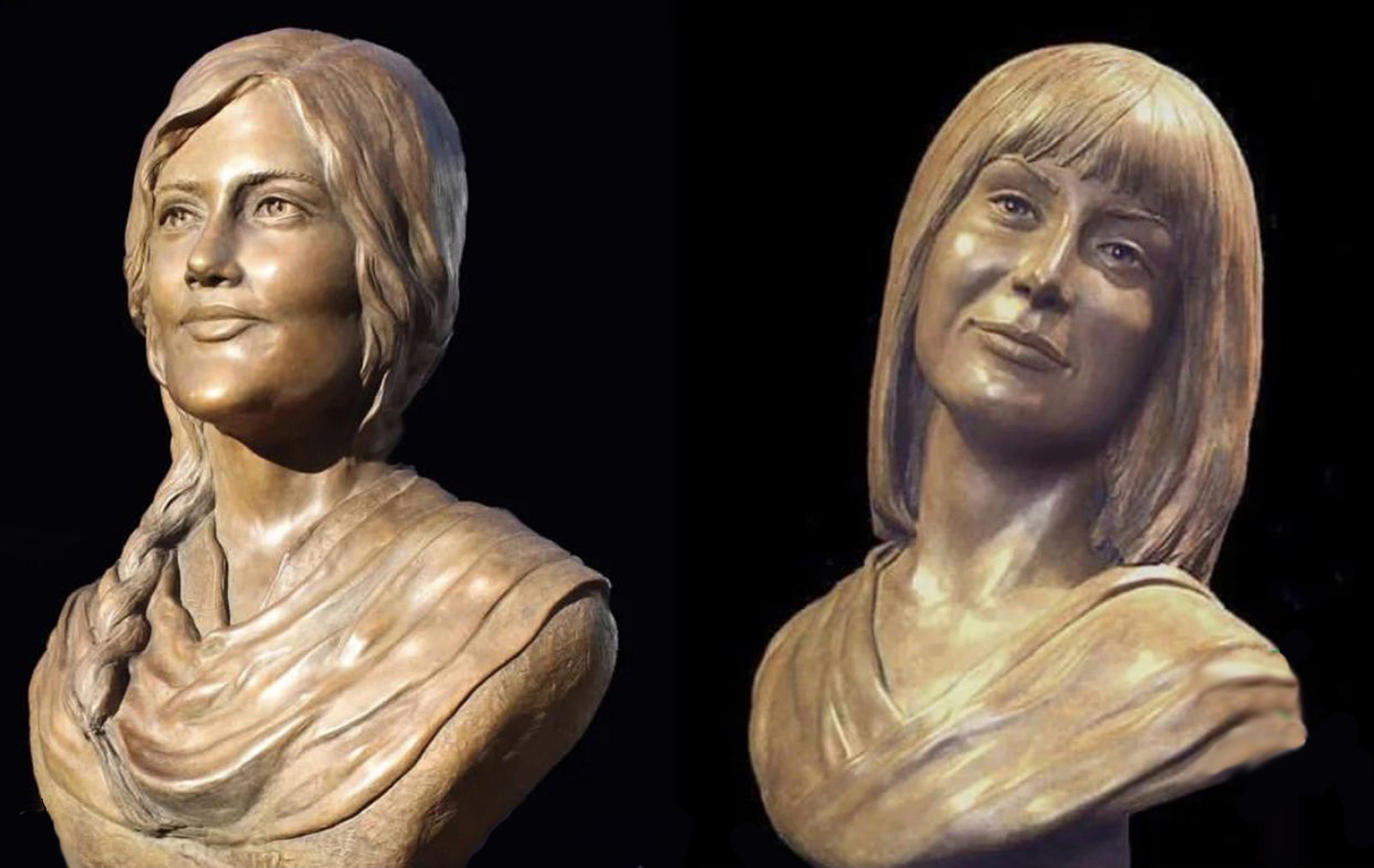
The Mahsa and Neda bronze busts.

Among her other works is a 1.5-times-life-size bronze portrait bust of William Charette, a recipient of the Congressional Medal of Honor who served as a U.S. Navy hospital corpsman for 26 years, including during the Korean War.

William Charette Bronze Bust
