= Drago (wrestler) =

Mexican professional wrestler (born 1975)

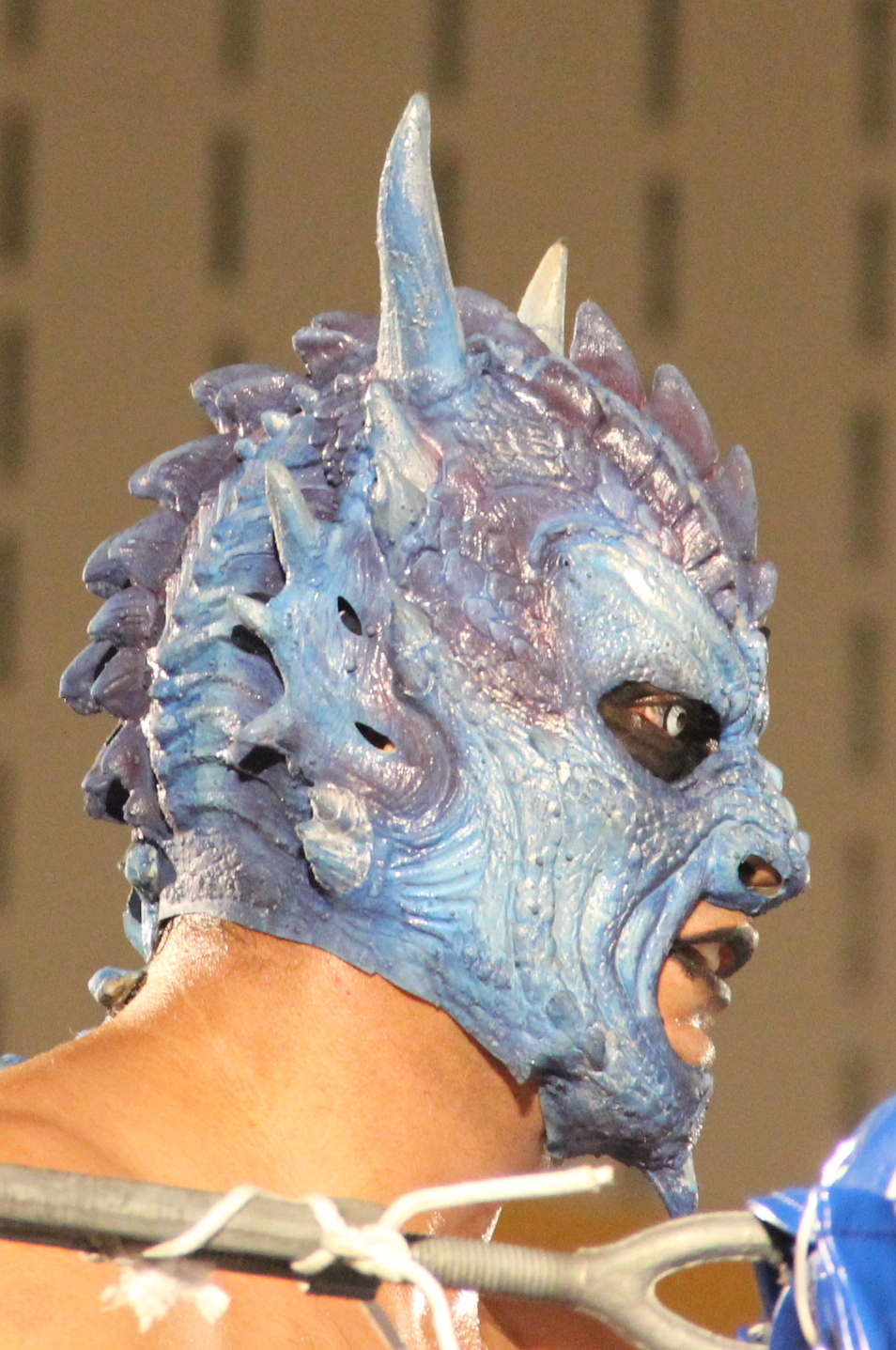
- Drago in 2015

Personal information
- Born: Víctor Manuel Soto Flores; July 23, 1975 (age 51) Mexico City, Mexico

Professional wrestling career
- Ring name(s): Alan; Billy Jean; Dios del Inframundo; Drago; Gato Eveready; El Gato; Jimmy Boy; Morfo
- Billed height: 1.74 m (5 ft 8 1/2 in)
- Billed weight: 79 kg (174 lb)
- Billed from: El Inframundo
- Trained by: El Picudo
- Debut: April 1998

Víctor Manuel Soto Flores (born July 23, 1975) is a Mexican professional wrestler known by his ring name Drago. He is best known for his work in promotion Lucha Libre AAA Worldwide, where he is the former one-time AAA Latin American Champion. He is also known for his time in Pro Wrestling Guerrilla (PWG) and Lucha Underground.

Currently working as Dios del Inframundo, Flores has worked as Drago as Gato Eveready or simply El Gato under which he was an unofficial member of the wrestling group Real Fuerza Aérea, and as Alan in the group called Los Barrio Boys.

== Professional wrestling career ==
=== Asistencia, Asesoría y Administración ===
==== Early years (1998–2001) ====
Victor Soto made his professional wrestling debut in April, 1998 on a Lucha Libre AAA Worldwide (AAA) show, under the name Morfo. Later on his ring name was changed to "Jimmy Boy" and he was teamed up with Billy and Vangelis to form a Boy band inspired group called Los Spice Boys. At Triplemanía VII Jimmy Boy, Billy and Vangelis defeated Los Payasos (Coco Amarillo, Coco Rojo and Coco Verde) in one of the undercard matches. At the 2000 Guerra de Titanes event Los Spice Boys lost to Los Vatos Locos (Espiritu, Nygma, Picudo and Silver Cat).

==== Los Barrio Boys (2001–2008) ====
In 2001 his gimmick was changed to Alan and he was made part of a group called Los Barrio Boys along with Billy Boy (formerly known as "Spice Boy" Billy) and Decnis. The team worked extensive storyline feuds with Los Diabólicos (Ángel Mortal, Mr. Condór and Marabunta) and with AAA trainer Gran Apache to help the young team improve their in-ring skills, especially the storyline with Gran Apache would shape the development of Los Barrio Boys over the years. On September 16, 2001 Los Barrio Boys made their first major show appearance as they wrestled the team of Milano Collection AT, Nitohei Oyanagi and Yasushi Tsujimoto to a draw at Verano de Escandalos. A few months later Los Barrio Boys teamed with Ice Cream to defeat Los Diabolicos and Police Man in the opening match of Guerra de Titanes. On December 12, 2002 Los Barrio Boys teamed up with Oscar Sevilla to defeat Los Vatos Locos to win the Mexican National Atómicos Championship. The team had one successful title defense, defeating Hator, Monje Negro, Jr., El Potro and Ben Hur on April 6, 2003 On July 18, 2003 the team lost the Atómicos title back to Los Vatos Locos but would regain them under a month later when they defeated Los Vatos Locos on August 8, 2003. Sevilla and Los Barrio Boys successfully defended the Atómicos title against Los Exoticos (Pimpinela Escarlata, May Flowers, Polvo de Estrellas and Sexy Francis) on October 26, 2003. Their second, and final run with the Mexican National Atómicos title ended on August 20, 2004 when they were defeated by The Black Family (Chessman, Ozz, Cuervo and Escoria, ending their combined reigns at 606 days in total. On December 5, 2004 Los Barrio Boys won a four-way match against The Black Family, Los Kumbria Kids and Los Espantapajaros at Guerra de Titanes.

By 2007 Los Barrio Boys feud with Gran Apache led to both Alan and Decnis turning against Billy Boy, attacking him and turning Rudó (bad guy or Heel in wrestling terms). Alan and Decnis even sided with Gran Apache for a while. After a few months Decnis decided to join a group called Guapos VIP, leaving Alan alone. Once the storyline with Billy Boy ended Alan turned tecnico (good guy or Face) and formed a new Barrio Boys group. Alan began teaming with Kevin, Javi and Ricky. The team only worked in opening matches and soon after Alan left the group altogether.

==== Gato Eveready / El Gato (2008–2011) ====
In 2008 Victor Soto began working as Gato Eveready, a masked character sponsored by the Eveready Battery. Originally another wrestler worked under the mask but Alan took over in the spring of 2008 and plays the character to this day, while occasionally working as Alan as well. Soto's first verified appearance as Gato Eveready came at AAA's 2008 Reina de Reina show, teaming with Aero Star, El Ángel and Pegasso in a loss to Los Piratas (Pirata Morgan, Pirata Morgan, Jr. El Hijo de Pirata Morgan and Barbe Roja). As Gato Eveready Soto often teams up with members of group Real Fuerza Aérea, although he has not yet officially been announced as a member of the group. On October 24, 2008 Gato Eveready was one of thirteen men participating in the annual Copa Antonio Peña tournament at the 2008 Antonio Peña Memorial show but was eliminated by Histeria in the first match of the Copa. In 2009 Gato Eveready has spent most of his time losing to Los Psycho Circus (Murder Clown, Monster Clown and Psycho Clown) in random six-man tag team matches or in a storyline where Exotico Pimpinela Escarlata made several advances towards him. In February 2011 Soto's ring name was simplified to El Gato, after Eveready Battery ended their sponsorship deal with AAA.

==== Drago (2011–2023) ====
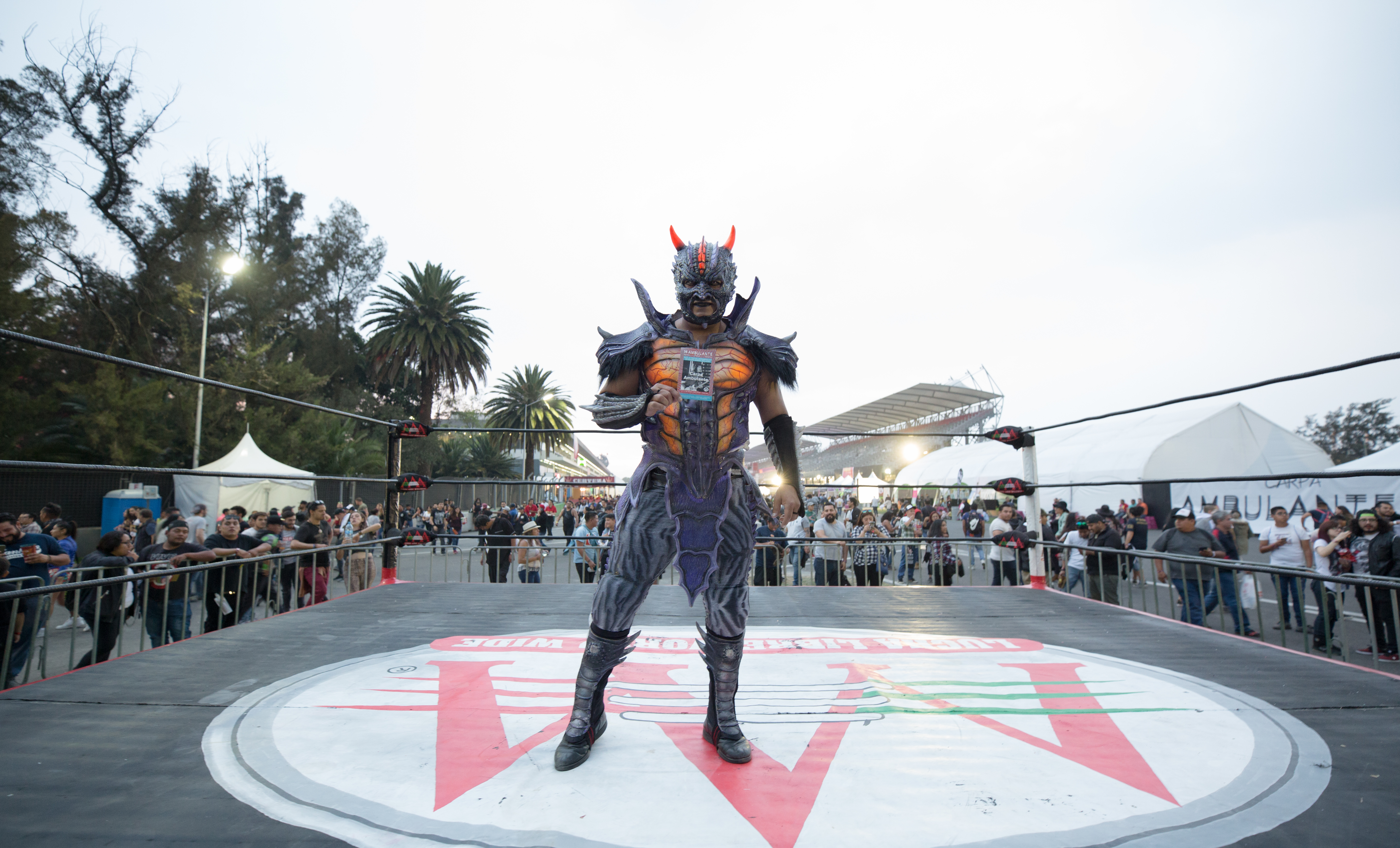
Drago in 2019

On April 20, 2011, Soto debuted under a new character Drago and was given a major push as a face fighting for AAA in the war against La Sociedad and Los Bizarros. Drago then joined forces with La Parka, Dark Cuervo, Dark Espíritu and Dark Ozz to form El Inframundo ("The Underworld"). On December 16 at Guerra de Titanes, Vampiro became the new leader of El Inframundo, replacing La Parka, who had recently turned rudo and joined La Sociedad. On July 19, 2013, Drago and Faby Apache defeated Halloween and Mari Apache for the AAA World Mixed Tag Team Championship. On August 11, Drago and fellow AAA worker Argenis made their debuts for All Japan Pro Wrestling in Tokyo, defeating Kenso and Sushi in a tag team match. Even before their first match in the promotion, Drago and Argenis were named the number one contenders to the All Asia Tag Team Championship, held by Burning members Atsushi Aoki and Kotaro Suzuki. In the build-up to the August 25 title match, Drago and Argenis began working against the Burning stable, defeating Aoki and Yoshinobu Kanemaru on August 14 and Suzuki and Kanemaru on August 16. On August 25, Drago and Argenis failed in their attempt to capture the All Asia Tag Team Championship from Aoki and Suzuki. On April 19, 2014, Drago and Apache lost the AAA World Mixed Tag Team Championship to Pentagón Jr. and Sexy Star. On June 14, Drago won AAA's 2015 Alas de Oro.

In early July 2023, Drago made a special appearance at an independent event under his new name as Dios del Inframundo confirming his departure from AAA.

=== Lucha Underground (2014–2018) ===
In August 2014, Drago was announced as one of five AAA wrestlers to star in Lucha Underground, a new American television series on El Rey. Drago debuted on the third episode on November 12, losing a three-way main event involving Pentagón Jr. and winner Fénix. Over the following weeks, Drago feuded with King Cuerno. On January 21, 2015, Cuerno defeated Drago in a Last Man Standing match, ending their feud. Then, he defeated Aero Star in a Best of 5 Series match. On February 21, 2015, Drago unsuccessfully challenged Prince Puma for the Lucha Underground Championship after Hernandez' interference cost him the match. As a result, Drago was in storyline forced to leave Lucha Underground. Drago returned on the June 10 episode, agreeing to put his mask on the line for another shot at being allowed to remain in Lucha Underground. Drago went on to win the match, defeating Cage, Hernandez and King Cuerno to retain his mask and become the number one contender to the Lucha Underground Championship. However, next week, Drago lost his opportunity against Mil Muertes after an interference from Hernandez. Soon after, Drago faced Hernandez and won via disqualification, before a rematch between the rivals would be announced for the upcoming Ultima Lucha event. At the first night of Ultima Lucha, Drago defeated Hernandez in a Believer's Backlash Match. At the season two Ultima Lucha on January 31, 2016, Drago, Aero Star and Fénix defeated Jack Evans, Johnny Mundo and P. J. Black to win the Lucha Underground Trios Championship. On May 7, Drago turned on Aero Star and Fénix and turning heel and took the Lucha Underground Trios Championship to form a new championship trio with Pindar and Vibora.

The series was discontinued after season finale, Ultima Lucha Cuatro.

=== Pro Wrestling Guerrilla (2015–2016) ===
On August 28, 2015, Drago made his debut for Pro Wrestling Guerrilla (PWG) by entering the 2015 Battle of Los Angeles tournament, losing to Pentagón Jr. in his first round match.

=== Chikara (2015) ===
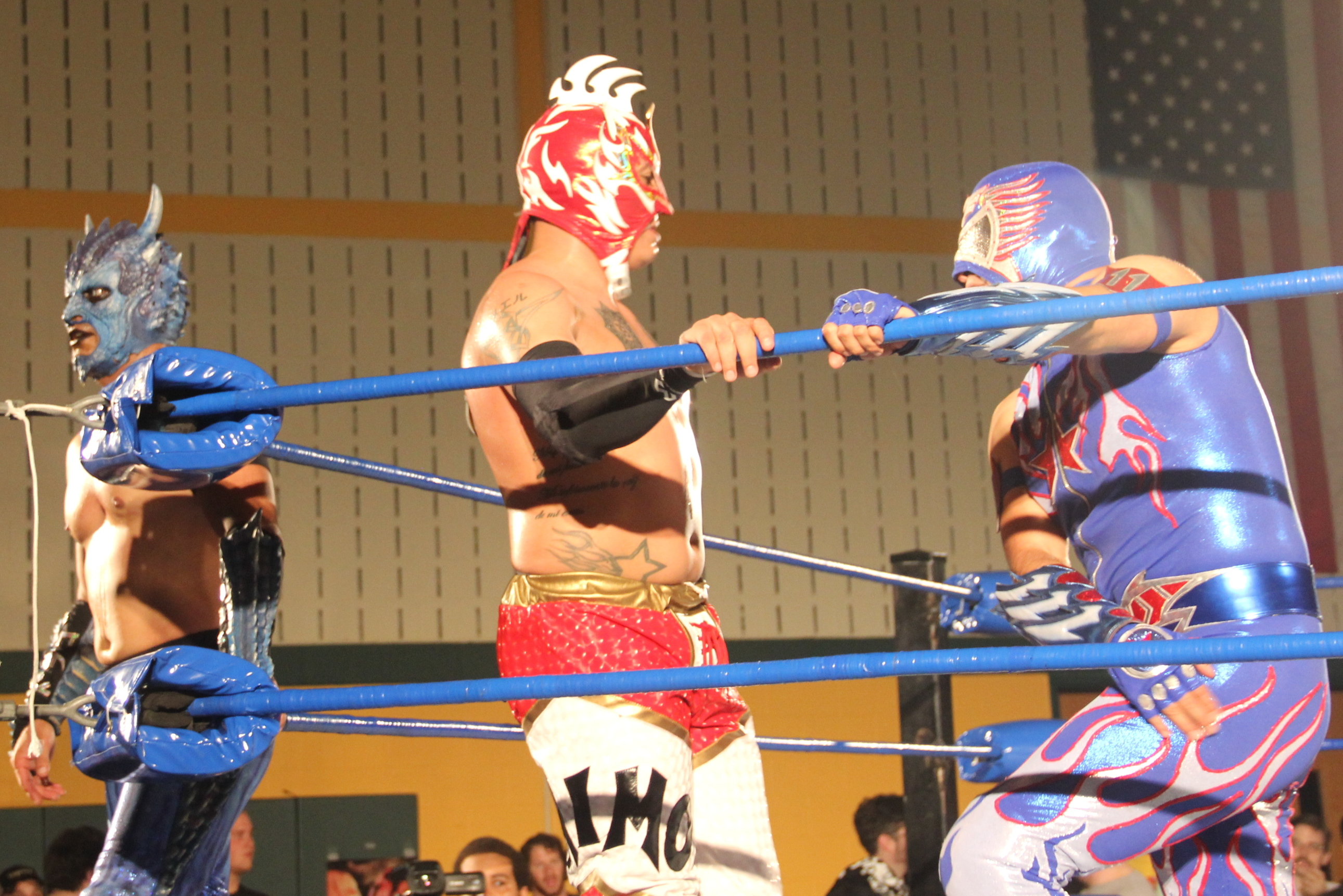
Drago (left) with Fénix and Aero Star at Chikara's King of Trios in 2015.

Drago made his debut for another American promotion, Chikara, when he, Aero Star and Fénix entered the 2015 King of Trios tournament as "Team AAA". They defeated the Gentleman's Club (Chuck Taylor, Drew Gulak and The Swamp Monster) in their first round match. The following day, Team AAA defeated the Nightmare Warriors (Frightmare, Hallowicked and Silver Ant) to advance to the semifinals of the tournament. On September 6, Team AAA first defeated reigning King of Trios winners, the Devastation Corporation (Blaster McMassive, Flex Rumblecrunch and Max Smashmaster), in the semifinals and then Bullet Club (A.J. Styles, Matt Jackson and Nick Jackson) in the finals to win the 2015 King of Trios.

=== Global Force Wrestling/Impact Wrestling (2017–2018) ===
On July 2, 2017 Drago and El Hijo del Fantasma represented AAA at Impact Wrestling's Slammiversary XV show, the team lost to The Latin American Xchange (Ortiz and Santana), who successfully defended the Impact Wrestling World Tag Team Championship and GFW Tag Team Championship in a match that also included Laredo Kid/Garza Jr. and Naomichi Marufuji/Taiji Ishimori. On the July 6 episode of Impact Wrestling, Drago entered the 2017 GFW Super X Cup Tournament.`

== Championships and accomplishments ==
- Battle Championship Wrestling
  - BCW Tag Team championship (1 time) – with Aero Star
- Chikara
  - King of Trios (2015) – with Aero Star and Fénix
- Inoki Sports Management
  - Inoki Dojo Cruiserweight Championship (1 time, current)
- GALLI Lucha Libre
  - GALLI Tag Team Championship (1 time) – with Aero Star
- Lucha Libre AAA Worldwide
  - AAA Latin American Championship (1 time)
  - AAA World Tag Team Championship (1 time) – with Aero Star
  - AAA World Mixed Tag Team Championship (1 time) – with Faby Apache
  - Mexican National Atómicos Championship (2 times) – with Oscar Sevilla, Decnis, and Billy Boy
  - Alas de Oro (2015)
  - Lucha Libre World Cup Best Match of the Night (2017) with Aero Star vs. DJZ and Andrew Everett
- Lucha Underground
  - Lucha Underground Trios Championship (2 times) – with Aero Star and Fénix (1), and Pindar and Vibora (1)
- Pro Wrestling Illustrated
  - Ranked No. 121 of the top 500 singles wrestlers in the PWI 500 in 2017
- Promociones EMW
  - EMW World Middleweight Championship (1 time)

== Luchas de Apuestas record ==
Winner (wager)	Loser (wager)	Location	Event	Date	Notes
Alan (hair)	Tony Cirio (hair)	N/A	Live event	Unknown	
Vangelis (hair)	Alan (hair)	Huamantla, Mexico	Live event	August 13, 2002	(Note: This was a steel cage match with Los Warriors (Kevin, Brandon, Vangelis) vs Los Barrio Boys (Alan, Decnis, Billy Boy).)
Drago (mask)	Tito Santana (hair)	San Luis Potosí, San Luis Potosí	Héroes Inmortales XI	October 1, 2017	(Note: This was a four-team twelve-man Domo de la Muerte match.)
