= Taiji Ishimori =

Japanese professional wrestler

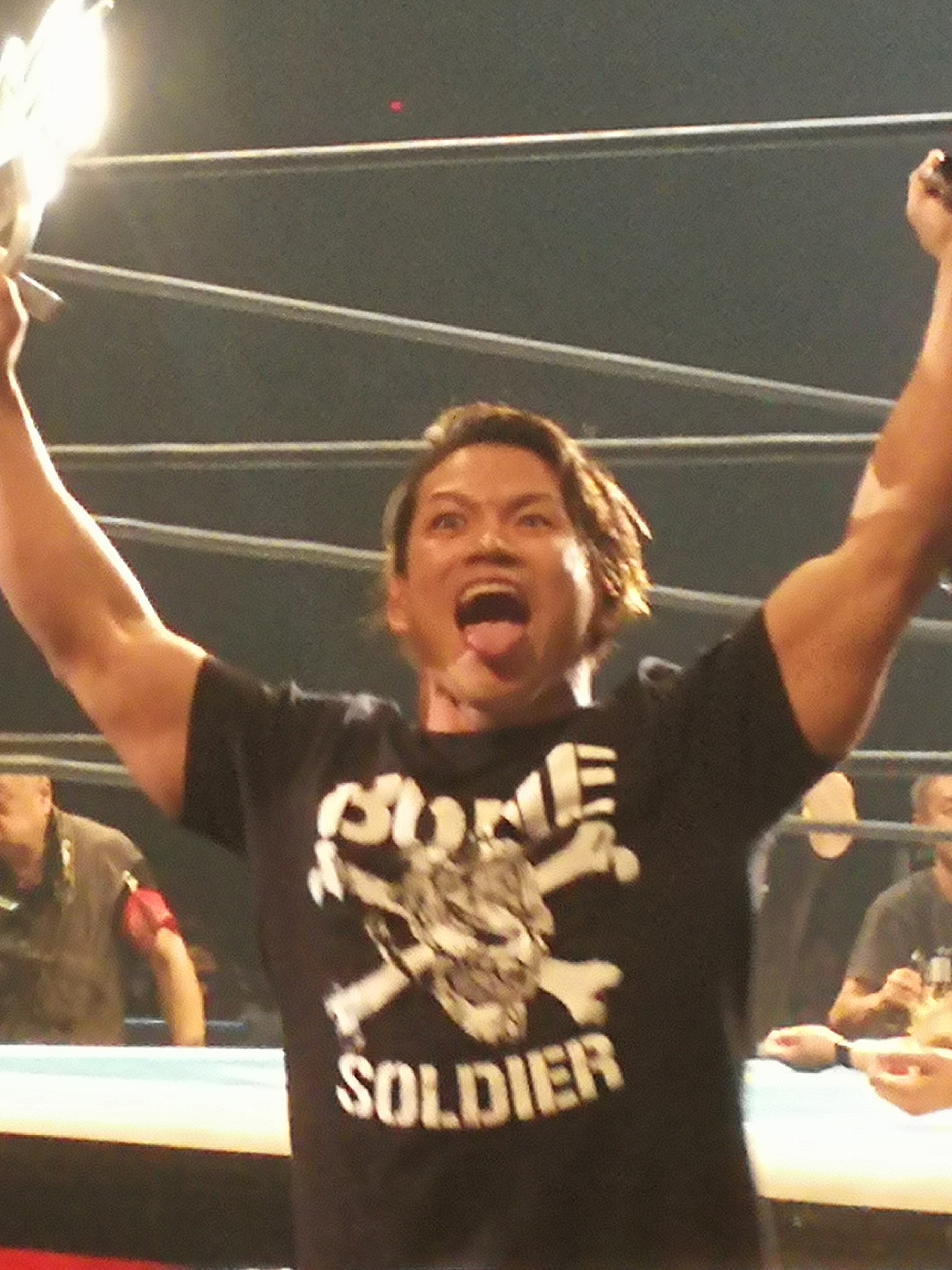
- Ishimori in November 2019

Personal information
- Born: February 10, 1983 (age 43) Tagajo, Miyagi, Japan

Professional wrestling career
- Ring name(s): Army Santa; Bone Soldier; Ishimori; Tai-chan; Taiji Ishimori; Superstar; Bone Soldier Jr
- Billed height: 1.63 m (5 ft 4 in)
- Billed weight: 75 kg (165 lb)
- Trained by: Tamon Honda; Último Dragón
- Debut: May 11, 2002

Taiji Ishimori (石森 太二, Ishimori Taiji; born February 10, 1983) is a Japanese professional wrestler. He is signed to New Japan Pro-Wrestling (NJPW), where he is a member of Unbound Co. and is one-half of the Strong Openweight Tag Team Champions with Titan. He is a former three-time IWGP Junior Heavyweight Champion, a four-time IWGP Junior Heavyweight Tag Team Champion (thrice with El Phantasmo and once with Robbie X) and is also a one-time NEVER Openweight 6-Man Tag Team Champion alongside former Bullet Club teammates Tama Tonga and Tanga Loa.

Ishimori is best known for his 12-year stint with Pro Wrestling Noah, where he became one of the most decorated junior heavyweights in the promotion's history, holding the GHC Junior Heavyweight Championship three times, while also setting the record for the longest reign with the championship at 405 days during his first reign. Ishimori also held the GHC Junior Heavyweight Tag Team Championship a record six times, and won the promotion's Nippon TV Cup Jr. Heavyweight Tag League a record four times. He is also known for his work in Impact Wrestling, where he is a one-time Impact X Division Champion.

== Professional wrestling career ==
=== Toryumon (2002–2004) ===
When he was an amateur wrestler, Taiji Ishimori was trained in Toryumon Mexico and debuted against Fumiyuki Hashimoto in 2002. He went to compete in the Young Dragons Cup and won after beating Jun Ogawauchi, Henry III Sugawara and lastly Condotti Shuji. Shortly after, he was given a pop idol gimmick and formed a boy band-like faction with Kei and Shu Sato, calling themselves the Sailor Boys. Ishimori was intended to become the "ace" (the top student) of his graduating class, even going so far as to release an album, "Keep on Journey", to support their gimmick. However, the fan interest never matched his hype, and Ishimori became one of Toryumon's bigger failures. Sailor Boys' rival faction, Los Salseros Japoneses (Takeshi Minamino, Pineapple Hanai and Mango Fukuda) was in turn more successful with the fans. While in the Toryumon X brand, Sailor Boys also feuded with Mini Crazy Max (Mini Cima, Suwacito and Small Dandy Fujii), defeating them in X's debut show.

Unlike the rest of his class, Taiji did his Japanese debut for All Japan Pro Wrestling's Wrestle-1 project. Returning to Mexico, he won the UWA World Welterweight Championship on May 11, 2003, defeating Super Crazy to win the belt. Ishimori defended the UWA World Welterweight Championship 2 times, against Fuerza Guerrera on August 31, 2003 and against Yossino on December 7, 2003. He dropped the UWA championship to Takeshi Minamino on August 29, 2004. He tried to regain the title in the Dragon Fire The Final Challenge event, but it was unsuccessful. Also, at the last Toryumon X show, Sailor Boys challenged Gedo, Jado and Katsushi Takemura for the UWA World Trios Championship, but they were defeated.

=== New Japan Pro-Wrestling (2004–2005) ===
Following the title loss, Ishimori began working for New Japan Pro-Wrestling (NJPW) as one of their "Young Lions" prospects. Very early in his NJPW run he was teamed up with Hiroshi Tanahashi for a one night U-30 (Under 30) tag team tournament. In the first round the team defeated Blue Wolf and Katsuhiko Nakajima and in the finals they defeated Ryusuke Taguchi and Shinsuke Nakamura to win the tournament. At one point he teamed up with his mentor Último Dragón for an unsuccessful shot at the IWGP Junior Heavyweight Tag Team Championship, held by Jado & Gedo at the time. By mid-2005, Ishimori had left NJPW and begun working for All Japan Pro Wrestling (AJPW).

=== All Japan Pro Wrestling (2005–2006) ===
In August 2005, Ishimori debuted in AJPW teaming with Keiji Muto. They, along with Kaz Hayashi, Satoshi Kojima and other face wrestlers, feuded with the villainous Voodoo Murders group. Ishimori also started teaming with another former NJPW rookie, Katsuhiko Nakajima, eventually taking part in the AJPW 2006 Junior Tag League. Together they defeated Kikujiro (Nobutaka Araya) & Kikutaro and Akira & Ryuji Hijikata, but they passed without achieving much success. Ended the league, Ishimori left All Japan.

During his time in AJPW, Ishimori also worked for the short lived promotion dragondoor as the top face (good guy), and once again failed to be accepted in that role by fans. He formed a high-flying faction with Kota Ibushi, Little Dragon and Milanito Collection a.t., but they were beaten by the stable Aagan Iisou led by Shuji Kondo. Ishimori also was in the El Dorado Wrestling debut show, leaving the promotion right after.

=== Pro Wrestling Noah (2006–2018) ===
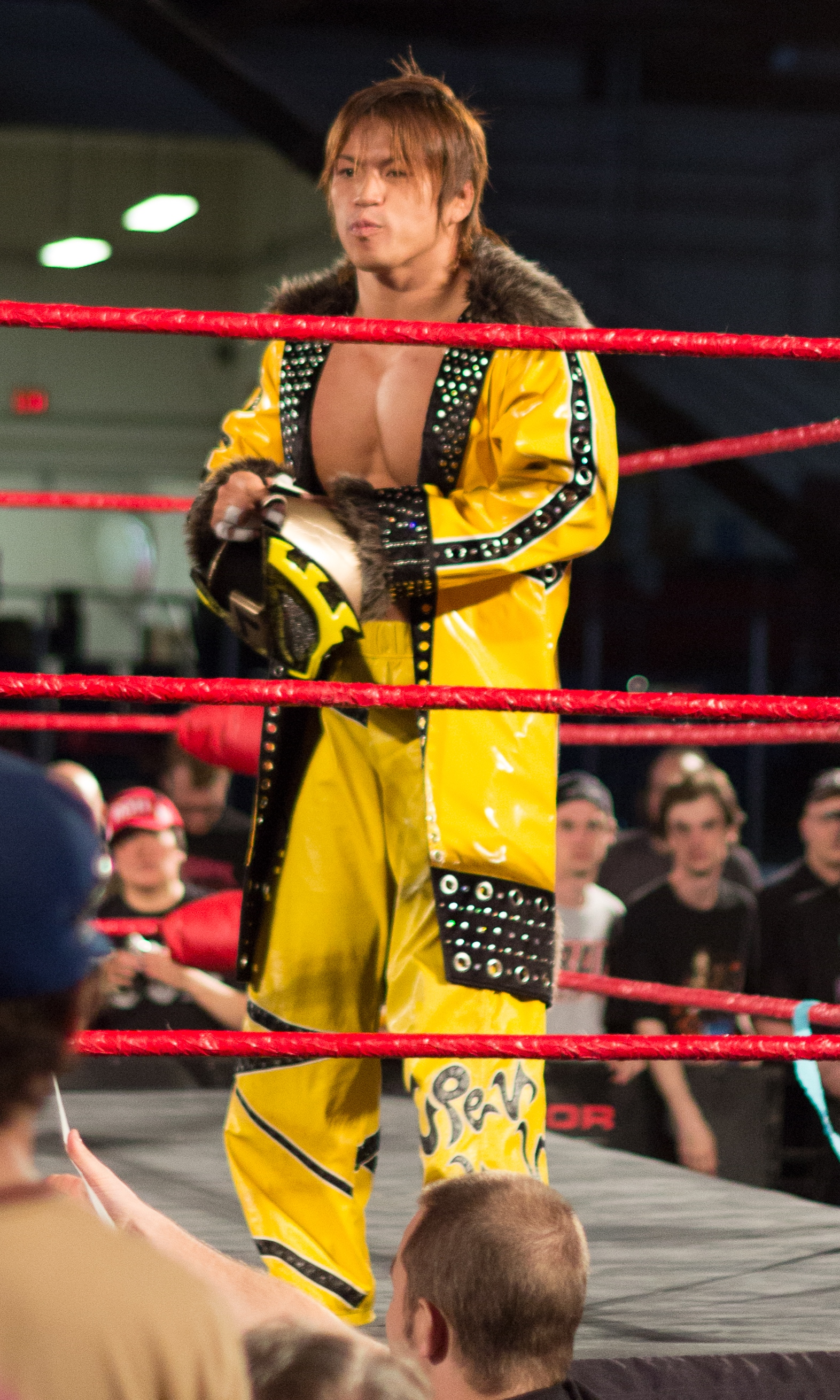
Ishimori in 2013

Ishimori began working as a freelance wrestler for Pro Wrestling Noah in March, 2006 and often worked as part of the SEM promotion that was considered the developmental territory for Noah. He began teaming up with Kenta, wrestling on many shows together, trying to earn a match for the GHC Junior Heavyweight Tag Team Championship. The team failed to win the title on their initial chance. Due to being trained in Mexico Ishimori often wrestled against Mexican Luchadores who toured with Noah, facing such opponents as Charly Manson or Abismo Negro. He also wrestled on the Noah / AAA co-promoted show TripleSEM on September 3, 2007 teaming with El Elegido and Kenta to lose to the Mexican Powers (Crazy Boy, Joe Líder and Juventud Guerrera). In 2007 Ishimori became a full-time Noah wrestler and shortly after Ishimori and Kenta won the Tag Champions. The team went to Dragon Gate and defeated the team of BxB Hulk and Shingo Takagi on March 20, 2008. to bring the Noah Junior Heavyweight Tag Title back to Noah. Ishimori and Kenta successfully defended the title against Ricky Marvin and Kotaro Suzuki and also the team of Bryan Danielson and Eddie Edwards from Ring of Honor. On July 13, 2008 Ishimori and Kenta were defeated by Yoshinobu Kanemaru and Kotaro Suzuki and lost the GHC Junior Heavyweight Tag Team Championship. In September, 2008 the team won the 2008 Nippon TV Cup Junior Heavyweight Tag League, with 12 points for 6 victories including defeating the reigning GHC Junior Heavyweight Tag team champions in the last match. In 2009 Ishimori began teaming regularly with Ricky Marvin, chasing after the Junior tag team titles. In early 2010 the GHC Junior Heavyweight Tag title became vacant when Kotaro Suzuki suffered a knee injury. Ishimori and Marvin teamed up for a tournament to determine the next champions. They defeated Bobby Fish and Eddie Edwards in the first round and Genba Hirayanagi and Yoshinbou Kanemaru in the finals to win the GHC Junior Heavyweight Tag Team Championship. On August 22 Ishimori and Marvin lost the GHC Junior Heavyweight Tag Team Championship to New Japan Pro-Wrestling representatives Koji Kanemoto and Tiger Mask. On January 27, 2013, Ishimori defeated Shuji Kondo to win the GHC Junior Heavyweight Championship for the first time. Through Noah's working relationship with Ring of Honor, Ishimori made his debut for the promotion on May 4, 2013, in Toronto, Ontario, Canada, facing Eddie Edwards in a losing effort. During the following day's tapings of Ring of Honor Wrestling Ishimori defeated Roderick Strong in a singles match. After a 405-day reign, the longest in the title's history, Ishimori lost the GHC Junior Heavyweight Championship to Daisuke Harada on March 8, 2014. He won the title for the second time on December 23, 2015, by defeating Taichi.

On July 5, 2016, Ishimori defeated Yoshinari Ogawa in a four-man tournament final to win one of Noah's three spots in NJPW's 2016 Super J-Cup. In this same month, Ishimori took part in the 2016 NTV G+ Cup Junior Heavyweight Tag League with his partner being American wrestler ACH. The pair won the tag league defeating Hajime Ohara and Kenoh for a spot in the final match then defeating Momo no Seishun (Atsushi Kotoge and Daisuke Harada), at the time the GHC Junior Heavyweight Tag Team Championship holders, in the final match. Their title match against Momo no Seishun was held on the final of the 2016 Super J-Cup and they were defeated.

Upon Atsushi Kotoge's vacation of the GHC Junior Heavyweight Championship, Ishimori faced Hajime Ohara for the vacant title on January 7, 2017, Noah's first show of the year. Ishimori lost the match to Ohara. Following a victory over Hi69 on January 9, the two agreed to form a tag team and made their interest in the newly vacant GHC Junior Heavyweight Tag Team Championship known. The team squared off with the team of Hayata and Yo-Hey on February 18 for the vacated title and defeated them to become the thirtieth champions. They went on to lose the title to Hayata and Yo-Hey in a rematch on August 26. On March 12, 2018, Ishimori officially announced his departure from Pro Wrestling Noah. Ending his 12-year tenure with the company.

=== Lucha Libre AAA Worldwide (2006–2007, 2010, 2015–2016) ===
Through Noah's working relationship with AAA in Mexico Ishimori sometimes travels to Mexico, wrestling for AAA. This began in 2006 when he travelled to Mexico to team up with El Oriental and Naomichi Marufuji to defeat The Mexican Powers (Crazy Boy, Joe Líder and Juventud Guerrera). Subsequently, he appeared on AAA's 2007 Rey de Reyes event, teaming with El Alebrije, El Zorro and Brazo de Plata to defeat Los Vipers Revolution (Antifaz, Histeria, Mr. Niebla and Kaoma, Jr.). On March 19, 2010 Ishimori teamed up with Takeshi Morishima to defeat La Hermandad 187 ("The Brotherhood of 187"; Nicho el Millonario and Joe Líder) to win the AAA World Tag Team Championship, representing the AAA heel ("bad guy") faction La Legión Extranjera ("The Foreign Legion"). On May 23, 2010 Morishima and Ishimori lost the AAA World Tag Team Championship to the team of Atsushi Aoki and Go Shiozaki during Pro Wrestling Noah's Navigation with Breeze show in Niigata, Niigata, Japan.

Ishimori returned to AAA on May 24, 2015, when he, Atsushi Kotoge and Yoshihiro Takayama represented Pro Wrestling Noah in the Lucha Libre World Cup. They were, however, defeated in the first round of the tournament by the Dream Team (Myzteziz, El Patrón Alberto and Rey Mysterio Jr.).

In early June 2016, Ishimori again represented Noah in the 2016 Lucha Libre World Cup. Team Noah, made up of Ishimori, Maybach Taniguchi and Naomichi Marufuji, finished fourth in the tournament.

=== Return to NJPW (2016) ===
On July 20, 2016, Ishimori returned to NJPW to take part in the 2016 Super J-Cup events. On night one, he was eliminated from the Super J-Cup tournament in the first round by Kushida. At night two on August 21, he and ACH utilized their championship opportunity granted by winning the 2016 NTV G+ Cup Junior Heavyweight Tag League to unsuccessfully challenge the GHC Junior Heavyweight Tag Team Champions Atsushi Kotoge and Daisuke Harada.

On October 21 at Road to Power Struggle, Ishimori and ACH entered the 2016 Super Junior Tag Tournament. They advanced to the next round after defeating the IWGP Junior Heavyweight Tag Team Champions, The Young Bucks in the first round. After defeating David Finlay and Ricochet in the semifinals on October 30, Ishimori and ACH were defeated in the finals of the tournament by Roppongi Vice (Beretta and Rocky Romero) on November 5.

=== Impact Wrestling (2017–2018) ===
Through a working relationship between Noah and Global Force Wrestling (GFW), Ishimori made his debut for the American promotion on July 2, 2017, at Slammiversary XV. Teaming with fellow Noah wrestler Naomichi Marufuji, he took part in a four-way tag team match, contested for both the GFW Tag Team Championship and the Impact Wrestling World Tag Team Championship, which was won by The Latin American Xchange (Santana and Ortiz). Ishimori also took part in the following week's GFW Impact! tapings, where he entered the 2017 Super X Cup, making it all the way to the finals, before losing to Dezmond Xavier on August 17.

Ishimori returned to GFW, now known as Impact Wrestling, on November 5, 2017, at Bound for Glory, where he defeated Tyson Dux to earn a future shot at the Impact X Division Championship. Four days later, Ishimori defeated Trevor Lee to win the Impact X Division Championship for the first time. He dropped the title to Matt Sydal on January 12, 2018, in a match where the Impact Grand Championship of his opponent was also on the line. In March, Ishimori signed his release from Pro Wrestling Noah, declaring himself a free agent, but with questions surrounding if he will ever be back on Impact Wrestling.

On June 4, the official Impact Wrestling Twitter announced that Ishimori would make his return to the company, under his NJPW Bone Soldier gimmick for Slammiversary XVI. At the event Ishimori lost a fatal four-way match which was won by Johnny Impact. On the July 26 episode of Impact Wrestling, Ishimori defeated Petey Williams. On the August 9 episode of Impact Wrestling, Ishimori and Williams defeated Desi Hit Squad which turned out to be his final match in Impact. After November 24, 2018, his profile was removed from Impact website.

=== Second return to NJPW (2018–present) ===
==== Bullet Club (2018–2026) ====
On May 4, 2018, at Wrestling Dontaku 2018, Ishimori returned to New Japan Pro-Wrestling (NJPW) as the new Bone Soldier, joining Bullet Club by attacking Will Ospreay. He reached the final of the 2018 Best of the Super Juniors tournament, where he lost to Hiromu Takahashi. At G1 Special in San Francisco, Ishimori aligned with the Bullet Club OG faction led by Tama Tonga. Later that year, he teamed with Tonga and Tanga Loa to win the NEVER Openweight 6-Man Tag Team Championship.

On January 4, 2019, at Wrestle Kingdom 13, Ishimori defeated Kushida to win the IWGP Junior Heavyweight Championship for the first time. He lost the title to Dragon Lee in a three-way match also involving Bandido at G1 Supercard on April 6. In June 2019, Ishimori and El Phantasmo won the IWGP Junior Heavyweight Tag Team Championship by defeating Roppongi 3K. Their 203-day reign ended at Wrestle Kingdom 14 in January 2020, when they lost the titles to Roppongi 3K.

On August 29, 2020, at Summer Struggle in Jingu, Ishimori defeated Hiromu Takahashi to win the IWGP Junior Heavyweight Championship for the second time. He lost the title back to Takahashi at Wrestle Kingdom 15 in January 2021. Ishimori and Phantasmo won the IWGP Junior Heavyweight Tag Team Championship for a second time in January 2021, but lost the titles the following month to Yoshinobu Kanemaru and El Desperado. They won the titles for a third time in June, before losing them to Robbie Eagles and Tiger Mask at Wrestle Grand Slam in MetLife Dome in September.

At Wrestling Dontaku 2022, Ishimori defeated El Desperado to win the IWGP Junior Heavyweight Championship for the third time. He held the title for 248 days before losing it to Takahashi in a four-way match at Wrestle Kingdom 17 on January 4, 2023. During the 2023 Best of the Super Juniors, Ishimori suffered a cervical spine injury during his match against Takahashi, forcing him to withdraw from the tournament. He returned at Destruction in Ryōgoku on October 9, attacking Takahashi and challenging him for the IWGP Junior Heavyweight Championship.

In January 2024, Ishimori won the vacant KOPW Championship by defeating Great-O-Khan, Toru Yano, and Yoh in a four-way match at New Year Dash!!. He lost the title to Great-O-Khan later that month. Later that year, Ishimori reached the final of the 2024 Best of the Super Juniors, defeating TJP in the semifinals before losing to El Desperado at Dominion 6.9 in Osaka-jo Hall.

On January 6, 2025, Ishimori announced that he had joined Bullet Club's War Dogs subgroup. At Battle in the Valley on January 11, he unsuccessfully challenged El Desperado for the IWGP Junior Heavyweight Championship.

==== Unbound Co. (2026–present) ====
After Wrestle Kingdom 20, at New Year Dash!!, David Finlay and Yota Tsuji announced the dissolution of Bullet Club and Unaffiliated, replacing the alliance with Unbound Co., which was a complete merger. On February 11, 2026 at The New Beginning in Osaka, Ishimori teamed with stablemate Hiromu Takahashi in Takahashi's NJPW farewell match, defeating Francesco Akira and Jakob Austin Young. On March 6 at NJPW's 54th Anniversary Show, Ishimori and Robbie X defeated Ichiban Sweet Boys (Robbie Eagles and Kosei Fujita) to win the IWGP Junior Heavyweight Tag Team Championship, marking Ishimori's fourth time winning the titles. On April 25 at Wrestling RedZone, Ishimori and Robbie X lost their titles back to Ichiban Sweet Boys. On November 3 at Power Struggle, Ishimori and Robbie X defeated the Ichiban Sweet Boys to win the 2026 Super Junior Tag League.

== Championships and accomplishments ==
- DDT Pro-Wrestling
  - Ironman Heavymetalweight Championship (1 time)
- Impact Wrestling
  - Impact X Division Championship (1 time)
- Lucha Libre AAA Worldwide
  - AAA World Tag Team Championship (1 time) – with Takeshi Morishima
  - Best Wrestler of the Lucha Libre World Cup award (2017)
- New Japan Pro-Wrestling
  - IWGP Junior Heavyweight Championship (3 times)
  - IWGP Junior Heavyweight Tag Team Championship (4 times) – with El Phantasmo (3) and Robbie X (1)
  - NEVER Openweight 6-Man Tag Team Championship (1 time) – with Tama Tonga and Tanga Loa
  - Strong Openweight Tag Team Championship (1 time, current) – with Titán
  - KOPW Provisional Championship (1 time)
  - Super Jr. Tag League (2026) – with Robbie X
  - U-30 One Night Tag Tournament (2004) – with Hiroshi Tanahashi
- Pro Wrestling Illustrated
  - Ranked No. 83 of the top 500 singles wrestlers in the PWI 500 in 2022
- Pro Wrestling Noah
  - GHC Junior Heavyweight Championship (3 times)
  - GHC Junior Heavyweight Tag Team Championship (6 times) – with Kenta (1), Ricky Marvin (1), Atsushi Kotoge (2) and Hi69 (2)
  - Nippon TV/NTV G+ Cup Jr. Heavyweight Tag League (4 times) – 2007 and 2008 with Kenta, 2012 with Atsushi Kotoge, 2016 with ACH
  - Super J-Cup Qualifying Tournament A (2016)
- Toryumon X
  - UWA World Welterweight Championship (1 time)
  - Young Dragons Cup (2002)
  - Yamaha Cup (2003) – with Shu Sato
