= Military Working Dog Teams National Monument =

National Monument of the United States in Texas

U.S. Military Working Dog Teams National Monument
- Military Working Dog Teams National Monument

- Location within the United States Location within Texas
- Location: Lackland Air Force Base, Bexar County, Texas, United States
- Nearest city: San Antonio, Texas
- Coordinates: 29°23′26″N 98°37′01″W
- Governing body: Department of Defense
- Website: myairmanmuseum.org/military-working-dogs/

The U.S. Military Working Dog Teams National Monument is a monument to military working dogs located at Joint Base San Antonio (JBSA)-Lackland in San Antonio, Texas. The monument represents handlers, dogs, and veterinary support, from all military service branches (Army, Marines, Navy, Air Force, and Coast Guard) that have made up the Military Working Dog program since World War II. The monument grounds include a 3,000 square feet granite plaza, granite pedestals, granite history wall, granite benches and water fountain. The granite pedestals have large bronze statues of dogs and handlers. The monument was dedicated on October 28, 2013.

== Monument ==
The Military Working Dog Teams National Monument consists of five bronze sculptures (four dogs and dog handler) seated on a large granite pedestal inscribed, "Guardians of America's Freedom." The center sculpture is a highly detailed 9-foot modern day Military Working Dog Handler wearing combat gear and holding a dog leash in his left hand and a M4 rifle in his right hand.

The remaining sculptures are four of the more common breeds of Military Working Dogs utilized by the United States Department of Defense since World War II. They include a Doberman Pinscher, German Shepherd, Labrador Retriever, and Belgian Malinois.

Behind the main granite pedestal is a large granite wall containing inscriptions about the history of the Military Working Dog program on one side. The other side of the wall contains laser etched images of Military Working Dog Teams in action during World War II, the Korean War, the Vietnam War, the Gulf War and the Wars in Afghanistan and Iraq.

Behind the granite wall are five flag poles, one for each of the five U.S. Armed Services which existed when the monument was built.

The "Not Forgotten Fountain", found in the south east corner of the Monument area, is a bronze sculpture depicting a Vietnam War dog handler pouring water from his canteen into a helmet. The sculpture represents a Vietnam era dog handler and his working dog. A significant feature is the dog's paw resting on the thigh of his hander accentuating their bonding relationship. The water fountain idea was conceived of by John Burnam and sculpted by artist Paula Slater as a means to honor and remember the dogs left behind at the end of the Vietnam War and to depict our commitment to never leave another dog behind. The water fountain is fully functional so that a visiting dog may have a drink. The granite pedestal of the "Not Forgotten Fountain" reads "In everlasting memory of all the war dogs who served, died, and were left behind in the Vietnam War".

== History ==
The monument was conceived by John C. Burnam, author and Vietnam veteran infantryman and German shepherd scout dog handler from 1966 to 1968). In February 2004, Burnam founded the John Burnam Monument Foundation to design, fund, build, and maintain a Military Working Dog Teams National Monument. Joining John Burnam were U.S. Air Force Vietnam veteran security/patrol dog handlers, Richard Deggans and Larry Chilcoat.

In 2007, U.S. Representative Walter B. Jones sponsored congressional legislation within H.R. 4986 National Defense Authorizations Act for FY 2008, Section 2877 of Pub. L. 110–181 (text) (PDF) authorizing the JBMF the exclusive rights to design, fund, build, and maintain the Military Working Dog Teams National Monument. The bill was signed into public law by the President George W. Bush on January 28, 2008.

Over a span of nine years, the JBMF raised $2.1 million from corporate sponsors and public donations to fund the construction and maintenance of the national monument. Arrangements were made with the Department of Defense to accept the monument and have it installed in the southeast corner of the 37th Training Wing Basic Military Training Parade Field at Joint Base San Antonio-Lackland. This site was selected by the JBMF due to its historical significance as the training center and headquarters of the Department of Defense Military Working Dog Program since 1958.

== Design ==
Graphic artist and designer Brian Rich, was tasked to digitally illustrate renderings that would bring their visions to life while telling the story of military working dog teams. The final design creates a visual structure that incorporates the simplicity of the subjects but also details the complexity of military working dogs and their handler's lives on the battlefield. The monument is meant to embody the history of the war dog program from World War II to present-day War on Terror theaters with meaningful purpose and accurate historical representation. It included all four U.S. Armed Services (Army, Marines, Navy, Air Force) and the US Coast Guard. The materials selected to build the national monument were granite and silicone bronze, which could stand the test of weather and time with minimum maintenance for its outdoor location. The concept and design was presented and approved by the U.S. Department of Defense (DoD).

The Keith Monument Company procured the entire horde of granite from the Rock of Ages Granite Quarry, Graniteville, Vermont. The granite components were cut to specifications, shipped to JBSA-Lackland and installed on-site. Pieces of the granite were cut-out to allow for lighting. Those pieces were gifted by the JBMF to key contributors and members of the Dedication and Unveiling Ceremony.

Artist Jim Smith, Laser Imaging and Design, Inc., created the artistic impression of authentic photos of war dog teams in action scenes since World War II. Authentic photos from World War II to the war on terror was acquired from public records at the National Archives in Washington, DC. The black granite panels were seamlessly mounted on the large gray granite wall.

The four large bronze dog sculptures and the 9-foot bronze military dog handler were crafted by artist and bronze sculptor Paula Slater, M.A. which were based on the initial creative design.

The bronze and granite fully functional "Not Forgotten Fountain" was conceived by John C. Burnam and sketched and sculpted by Artist, Paula B. Slater, M.A.

== Dedication and unveiling ceremony ==
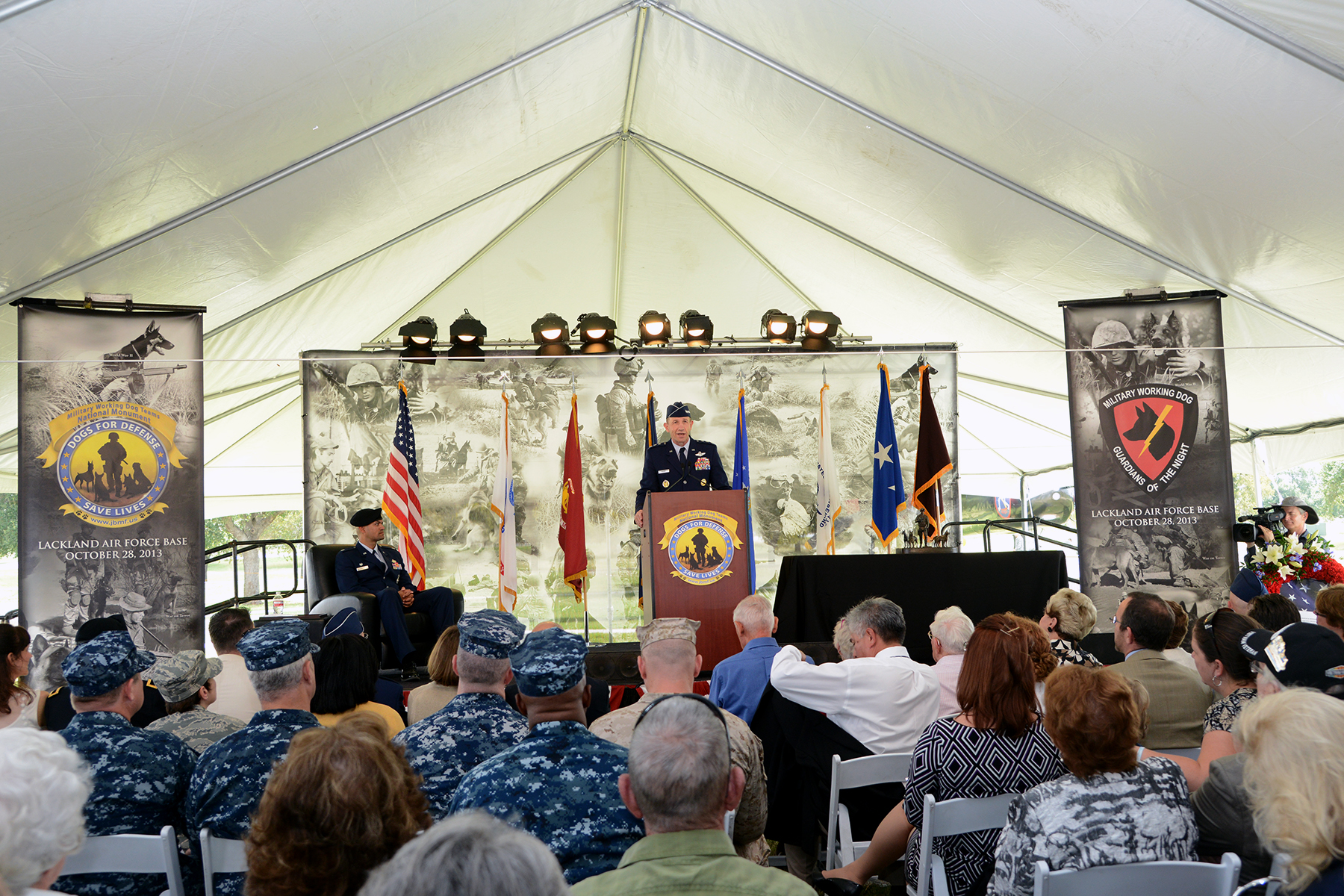
Lieutenant General Holmes speaks at the dedication ceremony.

The Military Working Dog Teams National Monument was unveiled during a formal dedication ceremony with full military fanfare on October 28, 2013. The event was covered by many local and national news organizations and was open to the American public. The ceremony was organized by the JBMF along with the assistance and under the direction of Lt Col Harris, 341st Training Squadron (TRS) Commander and TSgt Christopher Dion, 341st TRS Military Working Dog Handler Course Team Chief and representative to the JBMF.

Speakers included its founder and author, John C. Burnam, retired USMC Handler Ron Aeillo, President US War Dogs Association, USAF Wounded Warrior and K9 Handler cast member of the film Glory Hounds, TSgt Leonard Anderson, and USMC Handler and author of Sergeant Rex, SGT Mike Dowling.

== Public access ==
The Military Working Dog Teams National Monument is located on a secure United States Air Force Installation. However, Public Law 110-181 requires the Department of Defense to provide reasonable access to the monument by visitors and their dogs. Therefore, members of the public (and their dogs) who wish to visit the Military Working Dog Teams National Monument can access the installation to see the monument by requesting a base pass at the Lackland Air Force Base visitor control centers. The pass is limited to four hours of base access and can only be used to visit the monument. All those requesting access should know that they will be vetted for security purposes.

== Transfer of responsibility ==
In 2014 following the official unveiling of the monument, total responsibility for the care, maintenance, and promotion of the U.S. Military Working Dog Teams National Monument was transferred in perpetuity from the John Burnam Monument Foundation (JBMF) to the Airman Heritage Foundation under the leadership of its president, Jaime Vazquez. Following this the JBMF was shut down by its president, John Burnam. As a result, the Airman Heritage Foundation is the only organization allowed to create officially licensed products for the sole purpose of raising funds to care for and promote the Monument.

== See also ==
- List of national monuments of the United States
- National War Dog Cemetery
- Dogs in warfare
