= National War Dog Cemetery =

US military memorial in Guam

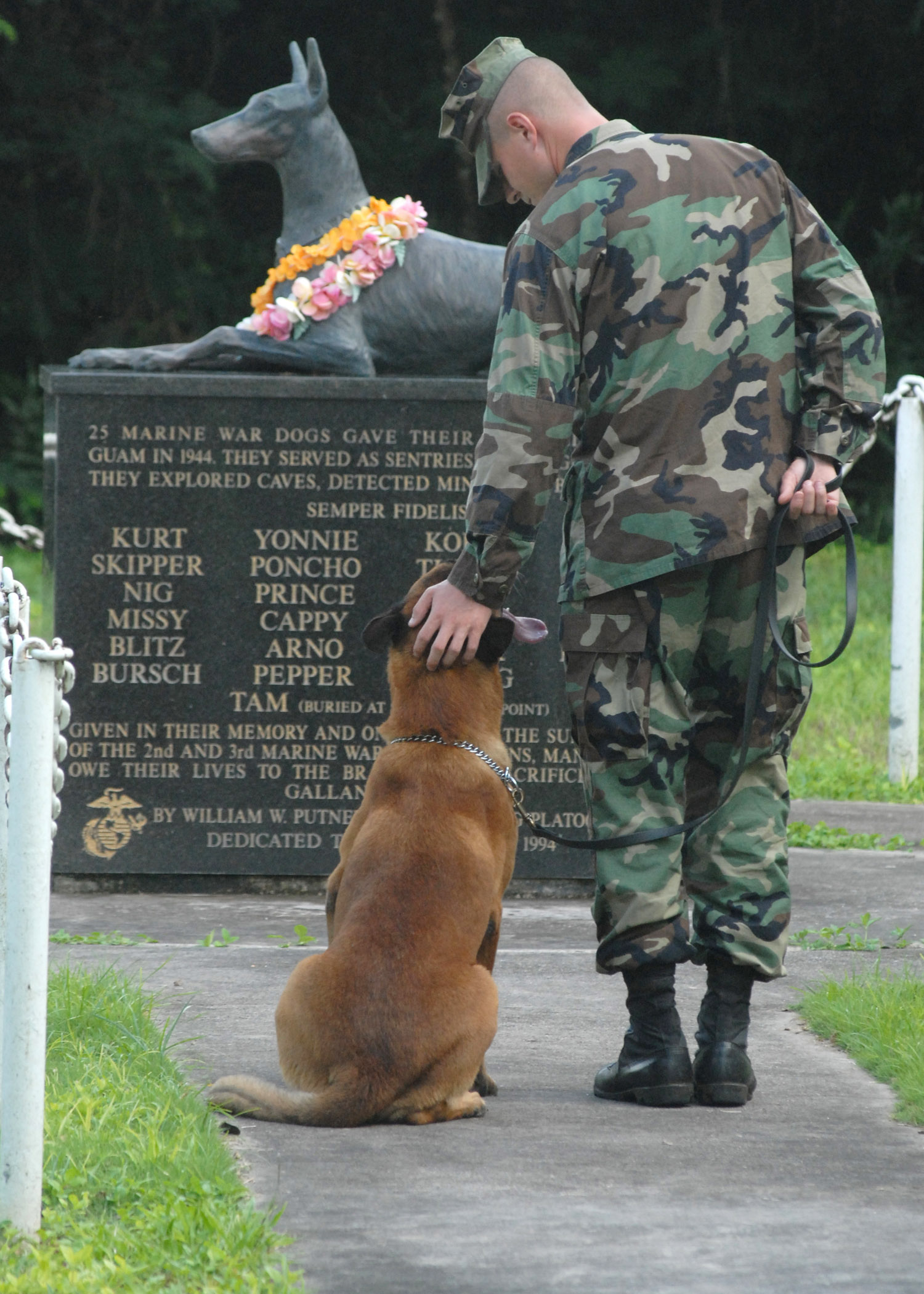
A U.S. Navy dog handler at the War Dog Memorial

The National War Dog Cemetery is a memorial to war dogs located at Naval Base Guam and is the first official war dog monument in the U.S. The cemetery honors the dogs—mostly Doberman Pinschers—that were killed in service with the United States Marine Corps during the Second Battle of Guam in 1944.

== History ==
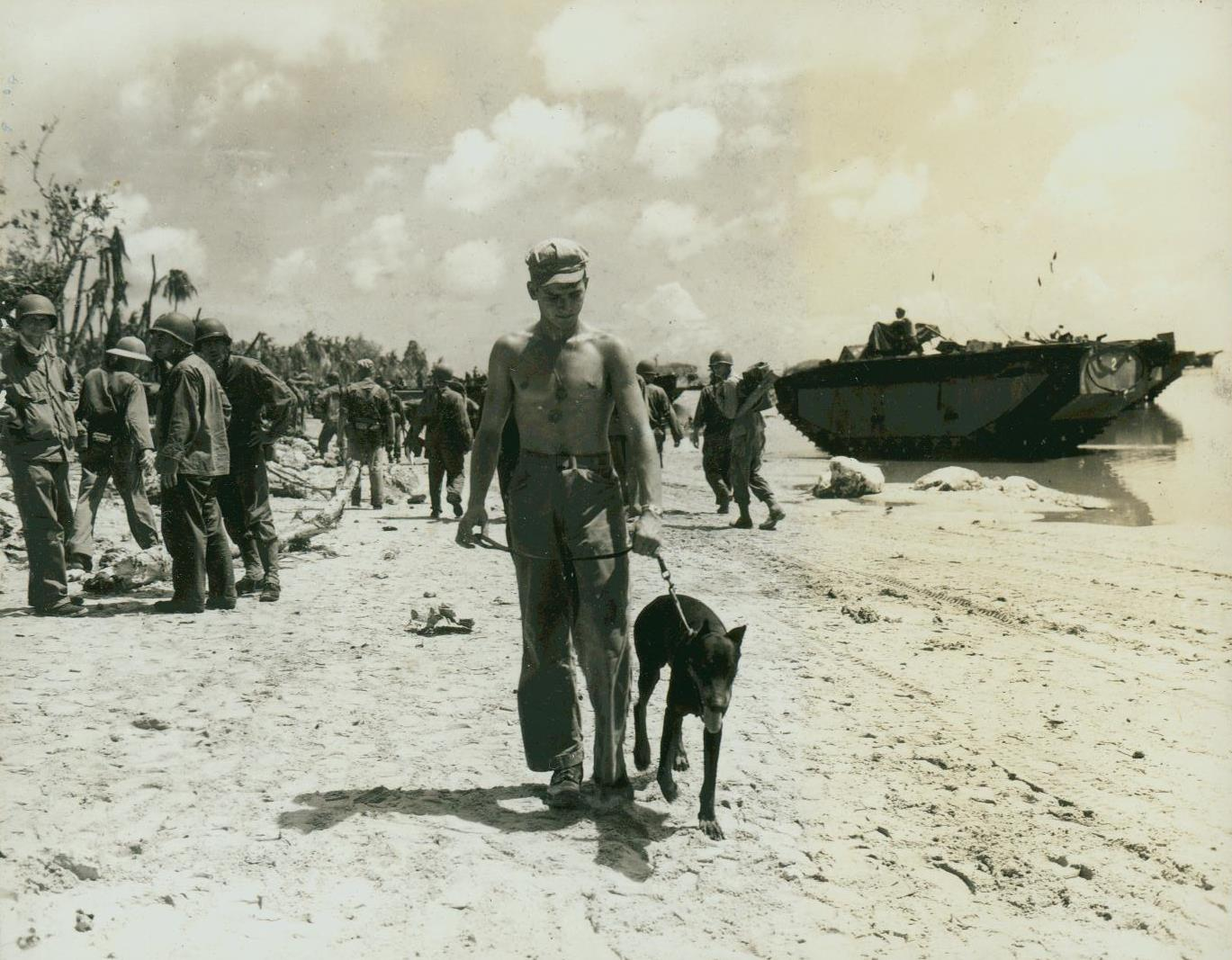
War dog and handler on a Guam beach, 1944

The island of Guam, an American territory since 1898, was captured by Japanese forces on December 10, 1941, in the first days of the U.S. entry into World War II. Guam was held by the Japanese for two and a half years, until U.S. Marines landed to retake the island in July 1944. Along with them were the 2nd and 3rd War Dog Platoons, used as sentries and scouts in over 450 patrols. They explored the island's cave system, detected land mines and booby traps, and guarded sleeping Marines.

In the most famous incident, a Doberman named Kurt, per Always Faithful: A Memoir of the Marine Dogs of WWII by William W. Putney, saved the lives of 250 Marines when he warned them of a massive Japanese force ahead. Kurt was badly injured in the ensuing mortar attack, along with his handler, PFC Allen Jacobson, who is said to have refused treatment until Kurt had been evacuated. Kurt became the first of the war dogs to be killed in action on Guam. Of the 60 Marine war dogs that landed on Guam, 25 died there and 20 more were wounded.

== Monument ==
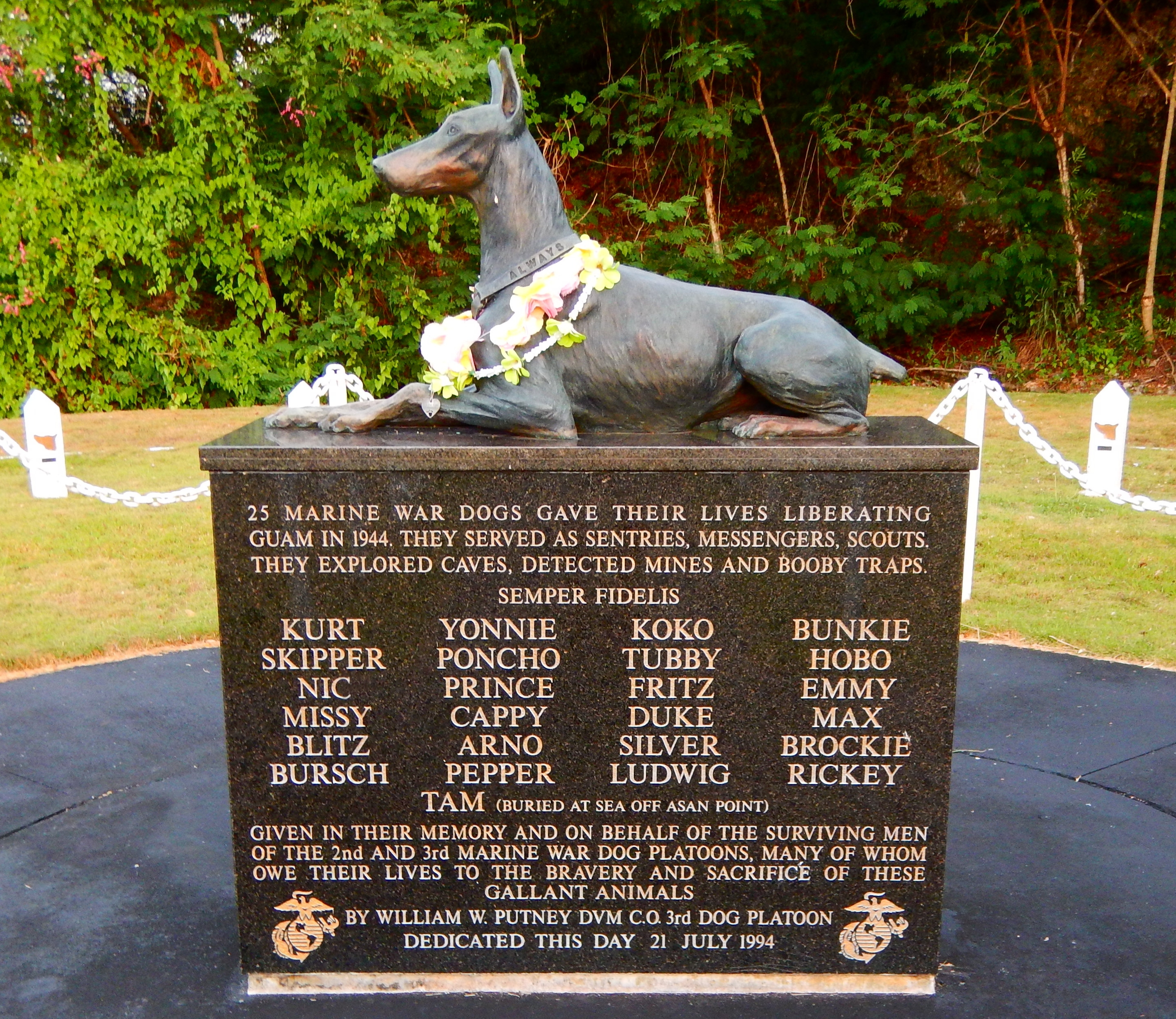

As the dogs died over the course of the battle, they were buried along with other Marines at Asan, the initial landing point of the invasion. White headstones were added later, forming a small plot in the cemetery. The human remains were eventually returned to the United States, and by the 1980s the dogs' graves had been largely forgotten and were overgrown with weeds. William Putney, who had served as the commanding officer of the 3rd War Dog Platoon, lobbied for the creation of a memorial to the dogs and with the aid of the United Doberman Club, raised funds for the monument. The monument was unveiled at the Pentagon in June 1994 and became the first official war dog monument in the U.S. The remains and markers were moved to a new cemetery on the naval base in June 1994 created by a Seabee detachment from NMCB 1.The memorial was dedicated on July 21, 1994, the 50th anniversary of the battle.

The sculpture atop the memorial depicts the famous Doberman, Kurt. Entitled Always Faithful, in reference to the Marine Corps' own motto, Semper Fidelis, it was created by California sculptor Susan Bahary.

== Other memorials ==
Fort Benning has a memorial to war dogs at the National Infantry Museum, installed in 2004. An identical sculpture is at March Air Force Base in Riverside, California.

Other life-size castings of the Guam memorial were installed at the following locations:

- 1998 – University of Tennessee's College of Veterinary Medicine
- 2001 – Alfred M. Gray Marine Corps Research Center, the university and conference center for the Marine Corps in Quantico, Virginia
- 2005 – Centennial Garden at Auburn University College of Veterinary Medicine, Auburn Alabama
- AKC Museum of the Dog in St. Louis, Missouri

John Burnam, a dog handler during the Vietnam War, successfully raised funds for the Military Working Dog Teams National Monument at Lackland Air Force Base, where military dogs have been trained since 1958.
