= Enab Baladi =

Syrian media organization

Enab Baladi عنب بلدي
- Logo with Motto

- The 24 January 2025 front page of Enab Baladi issue #674
- Type: Weekly newspaper
- Format: Tabloid
- Owner: Enab Baladi - Nonprofit Media Organization
- Editor-in-chief: Jawad Sharbaji
- Managing editor: Ammar Ziadeh, Bilal Abo Laban
- Founded: 2011; 15 years ago
- Language: Arabic; English
- Headquarters: Darayya, Syria (2011–2013); Istanbul, Turkey (2013–2025); Damascus, Syria (2025–present)
- Country: Syria
- Circulation: 7,000 (Weekly)
- Website: www.enabbaladi.org english.enabbaladi.net
- Free online archives: en.syrianprints.org/issues?agency=1

Enab Baladi (Arabic: عنب بلدي, lit. 'Grapes of My Country') is a Syrian nonprofit media organization that publishes a newspaper of the same name in Arabic and English. It was established in Darayya, Syria, in 2011, and has been recognized as a 501(c)(3) nonprofit organization.

== History and profile ==
Enab Baladi newspaper was launched in 2011 by a group of citizen journalists and activists in Daraya, a Syrian town in the suburbs of Damascus. Their names were Nabil Waleed Sharbaji, Ahmad Waleed Helmi, Jawad Sharbaji, Ammar Ziadeh, Mohammad Dalain, Rudaina Khoulani, Majd Ezzat Sharbaji, Manal Shakhashirou, Kholoud Helmi, Bahaa Ziadeh, Moawia Sharbaji, Muhammad Koraytem, Afraa Sharbaji, Ghada Al Abbar, Fadi Dabbas, Fadi Sharbaji, Noor Al Tall, Anas Al Saqqa, Rasha Khoulani, Moataz Murad, Mohammad Khaled Shehadeh, Mostafa Reesha, Mohammad Fares Shehadeh, and Azhar Sharbaji.

On January 29, 2012, its first issue was published. Since then, it has been printed each week on Sundays, with one two-week interruption in August 2012 due to the Darayya massacre committed by the forces of the Ba'athist Syrian government.

Since its establishment during the first year of the Syrian revolution, Enab Baladi (EB) has focused on promoting peaceful resistance methods to counter the sectarian and violent narratives of the Syrian government. EB coverage includes human rights violations perpetrated by the Syrian regime, the emergence of nascent Syrian civil society, as well as news in politics, the economy, and social affairs.

== Growth ==
The newspaper evolved from an amateur-run organization into one of the most prominent Syrian media organizations, according to the BBC Syria profile page.

Currently, Enab Baladi produces a weekly newspaper, an online news service in Arabic and English, and a print media archive. These projects are supported by a network of reporters and journalists who provide on-the-ground reporting in Syria.

Enab Baladi has drawn the attention of several local and international media channels. Its story appeared in Der Spiegel, The Guardian, and AFP News, among others. The French magazine Elle published an article about EB's women's team. As of May 2015, approximately ten women worked as reporters, editors, and translators for the organization. The Elle article tells the story of one of them, Kholoud Waleed, and highlights the role women played in establishing the newspaper, the challenges they faced as citizen journalists in Syria, and the successes.

== Partnerships, alliances, and coalitions ==
Enab Baladi built relationships with several international organizations, including the National Endowment for Democracy, Internews, Free Press Unlimited, European Endowment for Democracy, l'Association de Soutien aux Médias Libres, Adopt a Revolution, L'agence française de coopération médias, Norwegian People's Aid, and International Media Support.

Enab Baladi joined several alliances and coalitions:

- The Ethical Journalism for Syria Alliance (EJSA), which is funded by Free Press Unlimited, has partnered with over thirty Syrian independent media organizations. It "aims to restore and promote the fundamental rights of freedom of speech, thought, and expression in Syria through a gender-sensitive, multi-level approach."
- The International Coalition of Sites of Conscience (ICSC), which focuses on documenting the oral heritage of the Syrian conflict.
- The Syrian Network for Printed Media (SNP), which has partnered with four other Syrian independent newspapers to print and distribute news both inside and outside the country.
- The Syrian Regional Program (SRP), which provides media exposure for Local Councils in Syria, and the Assistance Coordination Unit (ACU), which produces multimedia reports on local initiatives across the country.

== Post-Assad era ==
In a July 2025 interview with the German cultural magazine Kulturaustausch, Enab Baladi co-founder Kholoud Helmi described the organisation's ongoing work as an attempt to provide "an alternative to propaganda and hate" in post-conflict Syria. According to Helmi, the organisation's reopening of an office in Damascus, the resumption of its print edition, and the launch of journalist-training programmes are intended to maintain a local presence and safeguard spaces for ethical reporting. She stated that Enab Baladi continued to face financial and operational difficulties following the withdrawal of some international donors. After President Trump halted funding for Syria, Enab Baladi lost USAID-related funding, including support from the International Research & Exchanges Board (IREX).

In July 2025, the staff considered safety risks when returning to Syria. Some of the editors in Turkey, Germany, and elsewhere outside of Syria who are part of the organization's extended team had not planned to return to Syria. Although the Ministry of Information had previously received copies of the newspaper, and ministers and other government officials were usually helpful in answering Enab Baladi staff questions, Helmi stated that the "margin of freedom" that the staff had might be reduced in the future by tightening government restrictions.

== Awards ==
The newspaper has won two awards through its co-founders: Majd Sharbaji, who received the U.S. State Department's Women of Courage Award, and Kholoud Helmi, who received the 2015 Anna Politkovskaya Award.

== See also ==
- Media coverage of the Syrian civil war
- SyriaUntold
