= SyriaUntold =

Media platform for articles related to Syria

- Native name: حكاية ما انحكت
- Categories: Civil society, culture, economy, environment, gender, and Syrian cities
- Format: Online, published under Creative Commons
- Publisher: UntoldStories e.V., Berlin, Germany
- First issue: 2013
- Country: Syria
- Based in: Berlin, Germany
- Language: English, Arabic
- Website: syriauntold.com/en/
- ISSN: 2944-764X
- OCLC: 1477620523

SyriaUntold (Arabic: حكاية ما انحكت) is a bilingual media platform that publishes stories, features, testimonies, and cultural reporting related to Syria and the Syrian diaspora. Founded in 2013, it publishes mainly in Arabic and English and operates as an online platform. It is registered as a nongovernmental organization in Berlin, Germany.

== History and profile ==
SyriaUntold was founded in 2013 as an online media initiative focused on producing narrative coverage of events and stories from Syria. The platform was created to disseminate critical perspectives on Syria and Syrians through testimonies, features, and journalistic articles. It covers topics such as civil society, culture, economy, environment, gender, and Syrian cities. The website is published both in English and Arabic, with three articles in Kurdish language published in 2024. Stories and news about Kurds in Syria have appeared in other articles. In 2015, SyriaUntold was registered as a nongovernmental organization in Berlin, Germany.

Following their goal of publishing in-depth information about Syria and to combine storytelling with other journalistic techniques, SyriaUntold features work by journalists, researchers, and writers from Syria, the Syrian diaspora as well as other contributors specialized in the North Africa and West Asia region. Examples of contributors listed on the platform include researchers in media and migration, journalists covering cultural and social developments, and editors working across SyriaUntold and its associated publication UntoldMag. It publishes a wide range of media, including narrative features, personal testimonies from the Syrian civil war, cultural and political analysis, as well as visual media, including illustrations, photographs, and videos.

In line with the platform's reporting on LGBTQ people, their 2010 article about the suicide of Egyptian activist Sarah Hegazi described how Hegazi’s death triggered grief, fear, and identification within Syrian queer communities. The article noted that some artists and other cultural figures expressed solidarity, sometimes at personal risk, indicating a gradual change in public attitudes.

According to their website, SyriaUntold is part of the broader “UntoldStories” ecosystem, which includes the global‑focus platform UntoldMag and the Mena Art Gallery. UntoldMag refers to SyriaUntold as its “sister website” and directs readers to it for in‑depth coverage of Syria. Its content is released under a Creative Commons license.

== Reception ==
In 2013, SyriaUntold joined the non-profit organization for grassroots citizen writers Global Voices. The Global voices website has since republished articles from SyriaUntold in English, Spanish, French and Russian as part of a content-sharing agreement.

In their 2014 article that translates as "Syria. How do you tell the story?" the London-based Arabic news media Al-Araby Al-jadeed discussed the questions "Who writes history and how?" in the age of multimedia that "has broken the strategic monopoly enjoyed by the victors of the past." The article reported about SyriaUntold presenting social and human stories as a complement to the image of the Syrian civil resistance, which usually was dominated by military and political news. The portal's editorial approach was described as first compiling a database of what Syrians publish on social media. After verifying this information, these accounts are presented it in narrative form by another editorial team. Finally, accompanying videos, photos or artworks are added to the stories.

In 2016, assistant professor in international media and communication studies Yazan Badran from Vrije Universiteit Brussel contributed a research paper for a conference at Lund University in Sweden titled "SyriaUntold and the anxiety of (digital) memory". This presentation introduced SyriaUntold's work and explained some of the journalistic techniques it uses. Its approach to storytelling was presented as crucial, as it presents stories without compromising their importance as pieces of evidence.

In 2020 the German Hannchen Foundation funded eight articles in SyriaUntold about LGBTQ people in Syria and the wider Arab world.

In 2021, the Delegation of the European Union to Lebanon and the Samir Kassir Foundation awarded their Samir Kassir Award for Freedom of the Press in the category for investigative articles to researcher and investigative journalist Sultan Jalabi from Syria. His report entitled “Syria’s lucrative detainment market: How Damascus exploits detainees’ families for money”, published by SyriaUntold on 16 April 2020, described 100 cases of families of detainees in prisons of the Syrian Ba'athist regime and their exploitation in a "complex web of financial transactions within the prison, security and judiciary system."

A case study published in 2023 by the World Humanities Report described SyriaUntold as an online media site that employs multiple forms of storytelling, including survivor testimonies and cultural features, to present critical perspectives on Syrian life.

== See also ==
- Media coverage of the Syrian civil war
- Enab Baladi
