= Kevin Fegan =

Playwright and poet local to Nottinghamshire, England

- Born: 25 July 1957 (age 68); Shirebrook, Nottinghamshire, England
- Occupations: Playwright and poet

Kevin Fegan (born 1957 in Shirebrook, Derbyshire, UK) is a British-Irish playwright and poet, known for his work in theatre, radio, and poetry. Over his career, he has written more than 50 original plays, published 10 collections of poetry, and edited several anthologies. Many of his works have been commissioned by major theatres across the United Kingdom. Fegan is recognised for his innovative site-specific productions, adaptations of real-life stories, and contributions to live literature and radio drama.

His writing style often blends prose and verse. His work explores a wide range of subjects, frequently focusing on the voices of disadvantaged communities, identity, artistic expression among non-professional artists, and the industrial regions of Britain.

His stage productions range from traditional one-person shows to large-scale multi-media performances. Notable works include The Palace of Varieties: The Life and Times of Dennis Skinner, Bess: The Commoner Queen, Obama: The Mamba, Fireflies, Slave: A Question of Freedom, White Trash, 52 Degrees South, Private Times, Excess XS, Strange Attractors, and Rule 43.

== Theatre ==
Recent commissions include The Palace of Varieties – life and times of Dennis Skinner, performed at Derby Theatre in early 2022., The Ruck (play about girls' rugby league) at Lawrence Batley Theatre then national tour, Down The Line (site-specific play for Barrow Hill Railway Roundhouse featuring The Flying Scotsman and Stephenson's Rocket) and Bess - the Commoner Queen (about Bess of Hardwick) opening at The Guildhall Theatre Derby then also commencing on a national tour.

Obama the Mamba, about Barack Obama's Kenyan brother, George Hussein Obama (loosely adapted from George's autobiography with Damien Lewis), was a co-production for Curve Theatre Leicester and The Lowry Salford and was Nominated Best New Play Manchester Theatre Awards 2012. Fegan's other recent plays for The Lowry Salford include Slave (from the book by Mende Nazer & Damien Lewis) produced by Feelgood Theatre at The Lowry in 2010, followed by a national tour in 2011 (Winner Pete Postlethwaite Best New Play Manchester Theatre Awards 2010 and Winner Best Play or Film Human Trafficking Foundation 2011); Fireflies: a love story waiting to happen commissioned & produced by The Lowry (nominated Best New Play Manchester Evening News Theatre Awards 2010); a 2008 studio play, The Forest; adaptations of Love on the Dole (nominated Best Special Entertainment M.E.N. Theatre Awards 2004) and Oh Wot A Lovely War (2006), both commissioned & produced by The Lowry.

His early stage plays for Contact Theatre Manchester include McAlpine’s Fusilier (a verse play about the Irish in Britain 1988, nominated Best New Play Manchester Evening News Theatre Awards); Excess XS (the first stage play about the rave scene, in verse, 1992 Winner Best New Play in UK Regions Plays International) and Strange Attractors: love in a virtual world (the first stage play about virtual reality 1994 Winner Best New Play in UK Regions Plays International). Other early plays include Private Times for The Library Theatre Manchester (nominated Best New Play M.E.N. Theatre Awards 1990) & in 1999 performed by prisoners and staff at H.M.Prison Grendon and Rule 43 (British prisons tour 1989 & 90, nominated Best New Play M.E.N. Theatre Awards 1989) and the community play for Moss Side/Hulme in 1993 Game Challenge Level 7 (N.I.A.Centre & Contact Theatre).

His large-scale site-specific work includes Lord Dynamite (co-written with John Fox), a Welfare State International production for L.I.F.T.’91, The Clay Man at Upper Campfield Market Manchester (a Manchester City of Drama 1994 production and Woolaton Park Nottingham (a Newartswork commission), Seven-Tenths for Walk the Plank Theatre Ship (British tour by sea, nominated Best Special Entertainment M.E.N. Theatre Awards 1996), 52 Degrees South(co-written & co-directed with Andy Farrell) at the Imperial War Museum North which was a Commonwealth Games Cultureshock production and Winner of Best New Play Manchester Evening News Theatre Awards 2002, Captured Live (Expo Leicester for Leicester Haymarket Theatre 2004) and Not Much Matches Mansfield (site-specific community play for Mansfield town centre).

His devised work includes Quarantine's award-winning White Trash(with young unemployed men at Contact Theatre 2004 and EatEat (with refugees & asylum-seekers at Leicester Guildhall 2003 in association with Leicester Haymarket Theatre).

His plays for young people include Get Real (Blackpool Grand Theatre 2003), The Ghosts of Crime Lake (Oldham Coliseum Theatre 2005), When Frankenstein Came to Matlock (Mansfield Palace Theatre 2008), ABC123 and The Selkie Boy (Ashton Group at Forum 28 Theatre Barrow 2009 and 2010) and Wan2tlk? (Liverpool Everyman Theatre 2001 and published by Methuen Drama 2008).

== Poetry and Print ==
Fegan has published ten books of poetry and edited over a dozen anthologies. He has performed widely at live literature venues across the UK and his poetry has appeared in multiple publications, such as the New Statesman and Index on Censorship. Several of his dramatic poems, including Matey Boy (commissioned by Welfare State International), Racer, Blast, and Let Your Left Hand Sing, have toured nationally. Racer and Blast were originally commissioned as radio dramas for BBC Radio 4 and were later adapted for the stage. Let Your Left Hand Sing was commissioned as part of the 2002 Commonwealth Games Cultural Programme.

His most recent poetry collections include Away Pitch (2012), as part of the Olympic Games Cultural Programme. The project, which paired regional artists with athletes, received the Inspire Mark award from the London 2012 organisers. The Singing Tree (2012) was commissioned by Corby Community Arts and published in the book Our Corby, reflecting the town’s diverse communities.

Between the late 80’s and mid 90’s, Fegan relaunched the Amazing Colossal Press, editing and publishing a series of first collections for fellow poets. He has also compiled and edited a number of community-focused anthologies, including Fabulous (2008), published by People Express, celebrating the lives of women in South Derbyshire.

Poetry Collections by Kevin Fegan
| Title | Year | Publisher/Commissioning Body | Notes |
|---|---|---|---|
| The Blue Balloon | 1988, 1990 | The Amazing Colossal Press | Collection inspired by Fegan’s residency at Stocken Prison. |
| Matey Boy | 1990 | Iron Press / Welfare State International | Book-length dramatic poem about a Trident shipyard worker. |
| The Space Between Us | 1991 | A Twist in the Tail | Collection of poems, with foreword by Henry Normal |
| Let Your Left Hand Sing | 2002, 2008 | Five Leaves | Book-length long poem about migration. Toured nationally. |
| Blast | 2002 - 2004 | Five Leaves / BBC Radio 4 | Dramatic poem about a Sheffield steelworker, commissioned by BBC Radio 4, adapted for stage at Contact Theatre. Nominated for a Sony Award. |
| Racer | 2003 | Five Leaves / BBC Radio 4 | Book-length dramatic poem about Isle of Man TT racing. Commissioned & broadcast by BBC Radio 4. |
| A Will of Iron | 2004 | Amber Valley Artery Project | Commission celebrating the village of Ironville. |
| Iron in the Blood | 2005 | Amber Valley Artery Project | Sequel to A Will of Iron, co-written with Roy Bainton. |
| Away Pitch | 2011 | The Brewhouse, Burton-on-Trent | Cultural Olympiad commission on sports and art. Winner of an Inspire Mark Award. |
| The Singing Tree | 2012 | Corby Community Arts | Reflecting the diverse communities of Corby. Published within Our Corby. |

== Radio, Film and TV ==
Fegan has written several original radio dramas commissioned by BBC Radio 4, spanning drama, documentary, comedy, and verse. His radio works include eight produced plays. Notable titles include In Denial: The Story of Paul Blackburn, Blast (nominated for a Sony Award for Best Drama in 2001), The Classic Serial drama In A Grove (starring Natasha McElhone), and the 15-part Woman’s Hour Drama Serial The Furys (starring Brenda Fricker).

BBC Radio 4 productions by Kevin Fegan
| Year | Title | Format | Notes |
|---|---|---|---|
| 2007 | In Denial: the Story of Paul Blackburn | Friday Night Play | Verse drama-documentary about a miscarriage of justice case. Featuring Paul Blackburn as himself. |
| 2002 | Racer | Afternoon Play | Dramatic poem about the Isle of Man TT races, performed by Paul McGann, including interviews with TT riders and staff. |
| 2002 | The Tuner | Friday Night Play | Follows an ex-miner who receives a call from a stranger. |
| 2001 | The Furys | Woman’s Hour Drama Serial | 15-part daily serial. Dramatization of five novels by James Hanley, starring Brenda Fricker as Fanny Fury. |
| 2001 | Blast | Afternoon Play | Dramatic poem about the South Yorkshire steel industry, performed by Paul Copley. Includes interviews with former steelworkers. Published by Five Leaves. Nominated for Sony Award for Best Radio Drama. |
| 2000 | In A Grove | Classic Drama Serial | Adaptation of Akutagawa’s short story, starring Natasha McElhone, Gerard Murphy, and Jack Davenport. |
| 1993 | A Dark Corner of Our Democracy | The Monday Play | Commissioned but not produced. Drama-documentary about the Anthony Alexandrowicz miscarriage of justice case. |
| 1989 | Upon St. George’s Hill | The Monday Play | Comedy about a group of modern-day “diggers” recreating the English Civil War. |
| 1985 | The Joke Shop | Afternoon Play | About government schemes (YOPS) for the young unemployed. |

He has also written and produced multiple short films, including Dancing in the Ruins (starring Lemn Sissay and produced in collaboration with Granada Television), which was screened at Kino Manchester and the Institute of Contemporary Arts, winning a North West Arts Film Award. He has also worked as a storyline writer for Granada TV's Coronation Street.

Fegan has made several appearances in national and regional media, both performing and promoting his work. He has been featured on BBC Radio 4’s Encyclopedia Poetica, ITV’s Word of Mouth, Granada TV’s Celebration, and BBC Three’s Whine Gums. He also served as gatekeeper for VPRO's production George Hussein Obama and Granada TV’s The Curious Case of Alex.
