= Damien Lewis (filmmaker) =

British journalist and writer

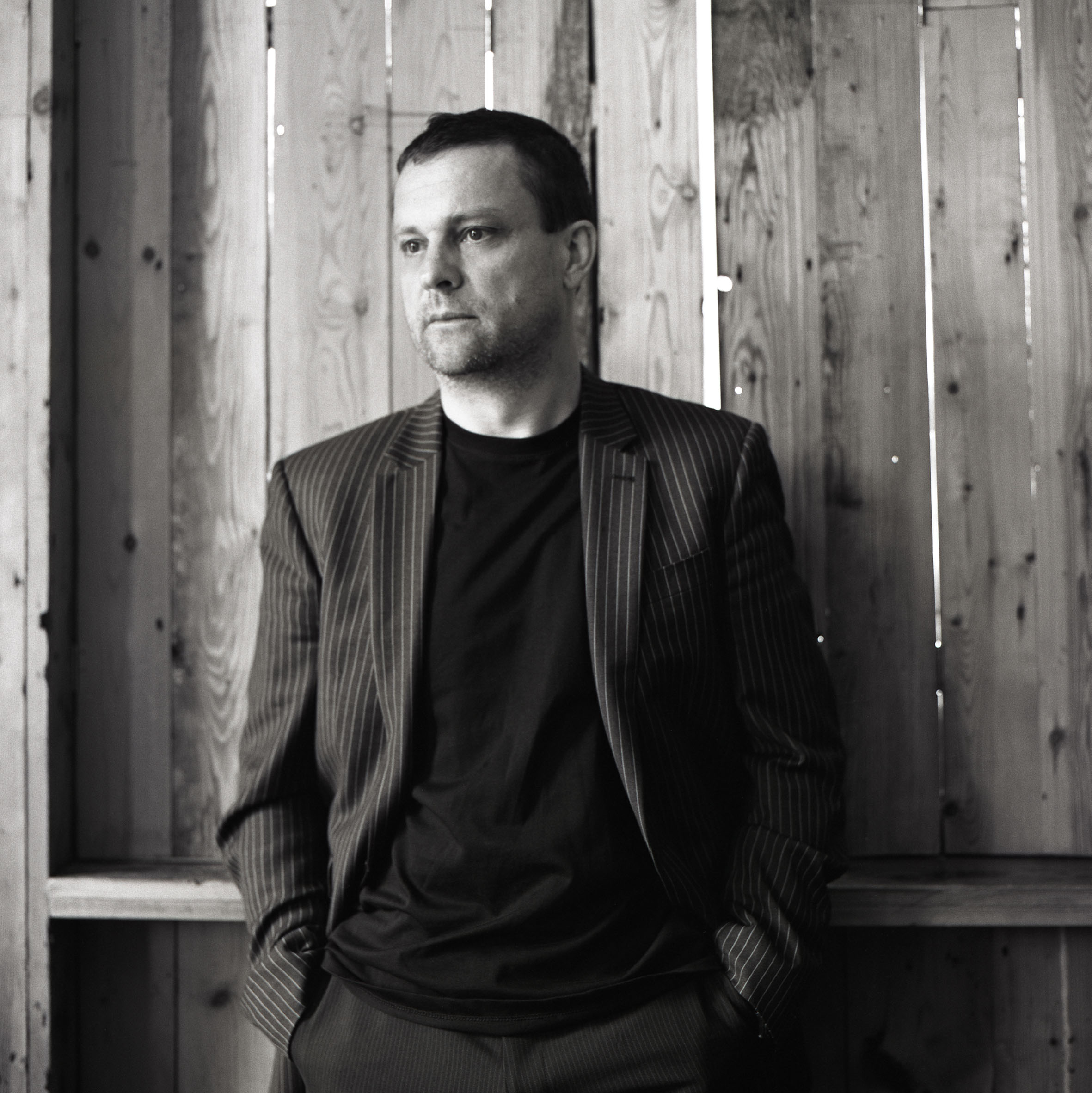
- Damien Lewis at The Frontline Club in 2011
- Born: March 1966 (age 60); Weymouth, Dorset, England
- Occupations: Author, filmmaker
- Spouse: Eva Maletnlema (m. 2004)
- Children: 3

Damien Gavin Lewis is a British author and filmmaker who has spent over twenty years reporting from and writing about conflict zones in many countries. He has produced about twenty films.

Lewis has written more than fifteen books, some of which have been published in over thirty languages. His books have appeared on bestseller lists in many countries. He is a Fellow of the Winston Churchill Memorial Trust and a Fellow of the Royal Geographical Society.

== Life and work ==
Lewis worked as a war correspondent, and between 1991 and 2005 he wrote, directed, produced and filmed documentary films for National Geographic, the BBC, Channel 4 and Discovery, amongst others, largely focusing on investigating and exposing environmental and human rights violations in Africa, the Middle East and Asia.

== Awards ==
- 1991: documentary film Parks or People?, about conflict between rainforest conservationists and indigenous tribes in the Congo, won the Wildscreen Film Festival Panda Award.
- 1998: BBC documentary film, Hidden Cost of Heroin, exposing how heroin is traded for wildlife on the Burmese border. This film won at the BBC One World Awards.
- 2000: Death in the Air, about the use of chemical weapons in the Sudanese Civil War, was a finalist in the British Rory Peck Awards.
- 2004: Slave, a novel, won the Index on Censorship Book Award at the Index on Censorship Awards.
- 2005 Lewis's War Hospital, about International Committee of the Red Cross doctors working in the world's largest field hospital in Sudan, won the Best of the Festival Award at the Columbus International Film & Video Festival.
- 2006 Lewis was chosen as one of the "Nation's Twenty Favourite Authors" by the UK Government's Quick Reads Initiative in war with World Book Day.
- 2011: Slave was adapted as the film, I Am Slave, which won the Drama Award at the BBC One World Media Awards in 2011.
- 2011: Slave was adapted into a stage play: Slave - A Question of Freedom, by Kevin Fegan. It won Best Stage Production at the inaugural Media Awards 2011 in association with the Human Trafficking Foundation, and Best New Play at the Manchester Evening News Awards.

== Personal life ==
In February 2018 Lewis became a patron for the Scottish charity Bravehound which provides assistance dogs for veterans.

Lewis's father lives in France and showed him Chateau des Milandes, which inspired Lewis to write a book about Josephine Baker.

== Books ==
=== Military ===
- Operation Certain Death: The Inside Story of the SAS's Greatest Battle (Century, 2004) - The account of Operation Barras, the attempt by the SAS to rescue the British Forces captured by guerrilla militia group the West Side Boys in Sierra Leone.
- Bloody Heroes: Ultimate Betrayal – Ultimate Firepower - Ultimate Revenge: The True Story of Britain's Secret Warriors in Afghanistan (Century 2006) - The account of British and American special forces unit deployed against Al Qaeda in Afghanistan.
- Apache Dawn: Always Outnumbered, Never Outgunned (Sphere, 2008) A chronicle of the Apache pilots deployed in the Afghanistan war.
- Fire strike 7/9 (Ebury, 2010) An account of an Apache helicopter Fire Support Team's tour of Afghanistan.
- It's all about Treo: Life and War with the World's Bravest Dog (Quercus Publishing, 2012) - The true story of Treo - the world's most highly decorated living dog – whose job it was to sniff out bombs in Afghanistan.
- Zero Six Bravo: 60 Special Forces, 100,000 Enemy, The Explosive True Story (Quercus, 2013) - Tells the story of a Special Boat Service unit caught in a ferocious enemy ambush in Iraq, who managed to inflict massive damage on their enemies despite being outnumbered and outgunned.
- War Dog: The No-man's Land Puppy Who Took to the Skies (Sphere, 2013, ISBN 978-0751552751) - The true story of a German Shepherd puppy Antis, rescued from World War Two no man's land in France by Czech fighter pilot Robert Bozdech, and their lives together.
- Churchill's Secret Warriors: The Explosive True Story of the Special Forces Desperadoes of WWII (Quercus, 2014) - The story of Winston Churchill's first 'deniable' secret operative force to operate behind enemy lines in World War II. This book was adapted into the 2024 action-comedy film The Ministry of Ungentlemanly Warfare. The book was republished in 2023 as The Ministry of Ungentlemanly Warfare.
- Judy: A Dog in a Million: The Heartwarming Story of WWII's Only Animal Prisoner of War (Quercus, 2014) - An account of the only dog to be declared an official Prisoner of War in Sumatra in World War Two.
- The Nazi Hunters (Quercus, 2015) ISBN 978-1-7842-9390-1 - About the SAS's secret mission after WWII to hunt the SS commanders responsible for the murder of their comrades.
- Hunting Hitler's Nukes: The Secret Race to Stop the Nazi Bomb (2016), ISBN 978-1-78648-208-2, details the Norwegian heavy water sabotage by Norwegian & British Commandos of the Vemork Hydroelectric Plant during WW2.
- SAS Ghost Patrol (Quercus, 2017) ISBN 978-1-7864-8313-3; LRDG/SAS raids on Tobruk and Barce in 1942.

=== Biographies and memoirs ===
- Slave (PublicAffairs, 2004) The life story of Mende Nazer who was stolen from her village in the Nuba Mountains and sold into life as a domestic slave in Khartoum and then London.
- Tears of the Desert: Surviving The Genocide - One Woman's True Story (Hodder & Stoughton 2008) The biography of Sudanese doctor Halima Bashir who suffered greatly as a result of speaking out about the torture of her people by the Janjaweed Arab militias.
- Little Daughter: A Memoir of Survival in Burma and the West (Simon & Schuster, 2009) The life story of Zoya Phan, a Karen refugee from war-torn Burma who went on to become the face of Burma's enslaved people.
- Homeland: An Extraordinary Story of Hope and Survival (Simon & Schuster, 2010) Tells the story of U.S. President Barack Obama's Kenyan half-brother George Obama who gave up a life of crime to help improve the lives of children in the Nairobi slums.
- Forbidden Lessons in a Kabul Guesthouse: The True Story of One Woman Who Risked Everything to Bring Hope to Afghanistan (Virago, 2011) Is the story of how Suraya Sadeed set up an underground school for girls in Kabul, offering hope and aid to thousands of fellow Afghans.
- Against a Tide of Evil: How One Man Became the Whistleblower to the First Mass Murder of the Twenty-First Century (Mainstream Publishing 2013) - The story of Mukesh Kapila, the former head of the United Nations in Sudan, who brought about justice for those responsible for the Darfur genocide.
- Lewis, Damien (2022). Agent Josephine: American beauty, French hero, British spy (First US ed.). New York: PublicAffairs. ISBN 978-1541700666.

=== Thrillers ===
- Desert Claw (Arrow, 2006) The fictional tale of ex-SAS soldier Mat Kilbride who takes on a black ops deniable mission to forcibly retrieve a priceless Van Gogh painting looted from a palace in post war Iraq.
- Cobra Gold (Century 2007) The fictional story of SAS veteran Luke Kilbride's search for 50 million dollars' worth of gold bullion he and his team stole in a Beirut bank heist twenty years before.
