= Mariana Katzarova =

Bulgarian journalist and UN special rapporteur

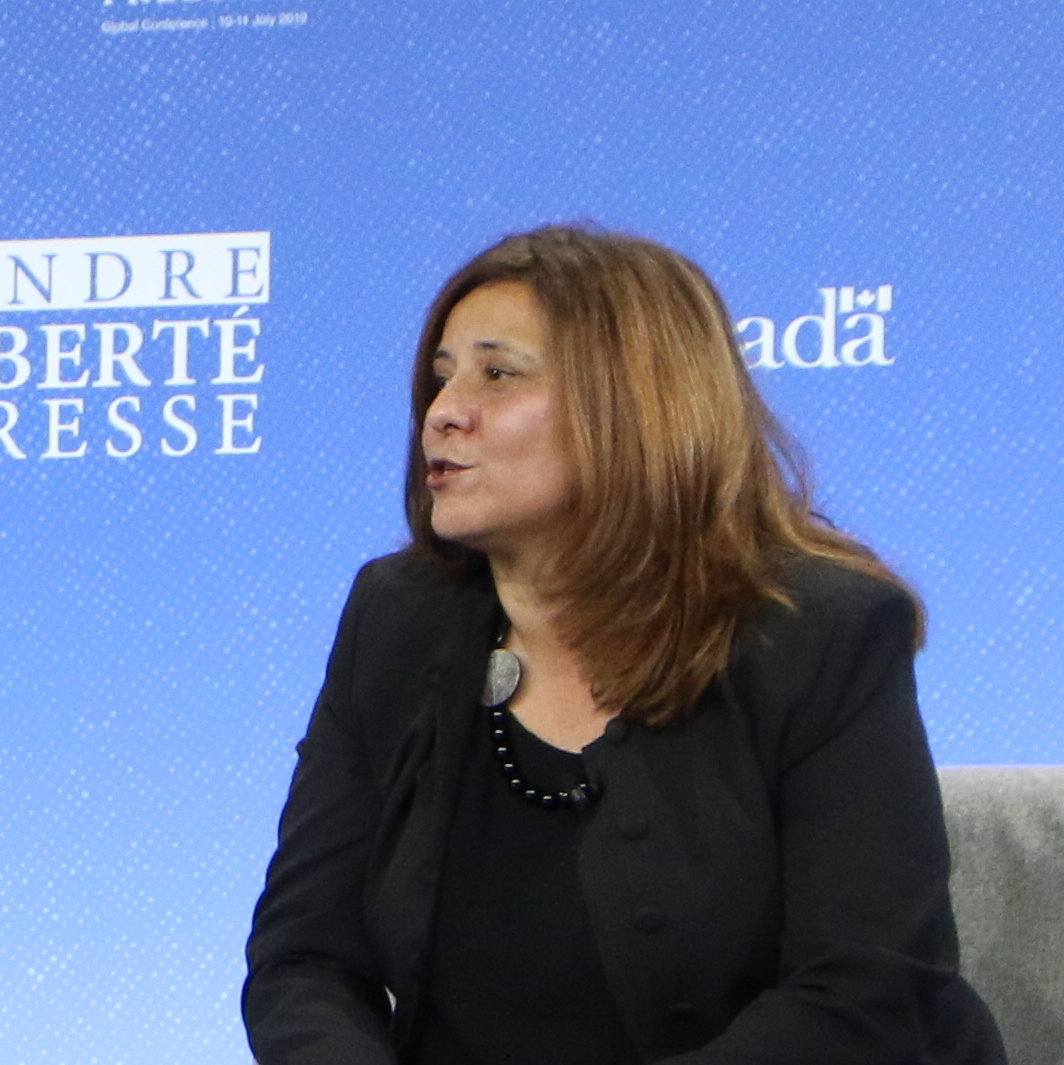
- in 2019
- Born: August 1966 (age 59); Sofia
- Occupations: journalist and campaigner
- Known for: United Nations Special Rapporteur on Russia

Mariana Katzarova (born 1966) is a Bulgarian journalist who founded the charity 'RAW on WAR', which created the Anna Politkovskaya Award. She became the first United Nations Special Rapporteur for the Russian Federation in 2023.

== Early life and education ==
Katzarova was born in 1966 in Sofia in Bulgaria. She was an only child and she was in trouble in school when she put up posters after John Lennon died. She attended Sofia University and New York's Columbia University. After graduating, she later studied at the Geneva Academy of International Humanitarian Law and Human Rights and the London School of Economics to learn about humanitarian law and human rights.

== Career ==
In 1989 the undemocratic Bulgarian government was changed, and Katzarova became a co-founder of the new Bulgarian newspaper, Democracy. She moved to America in 1990.

After completing her course at Columbia University she worked for the Institute for Human Rights and the Bar Committee for Human Rights. She left New York when she became the first Bulgarian hired by Amnesty International (in the UK) in 1995. She was employed for over a decade researching Russian related information.

In 2006, she founded the charity 'RAW on WAR', after reporting on wars in Bosnia, Kosovo, and then Chechnya for a decade. That charity created the Anna Politkovskaya Award in 2007 which is named for a journalist who was assassinated in Moscow.

Katzarova was chosen as the United Nations Special Rapporteur to look at human rights issues within the Russian Federation from 1 May 2023. In September 2023 Russia made moves in the United Nations to restore its position on the Human Rights Council. Katzarova commented that the human-rights situation in Russia was getting worse. Critics in Russia of the invasion of Ukraine were receiving arrest and torture.

In February 2024, she spoke out when the Russian opposition leader, Alexei Navalny, died while in an arctic prison.
