= Suraya Sadeed =

Afghan-American author and philanthropist

- Born: Kabul, Afghanistan
- Occupations: Writer, philanthropist
- Writing career
- Genre: Autobiography

Suraya Sadeed is an Afghan-born American author, philanthropist, and activist. She is the executive director of Help the Afghan Children, a charity organization.

== Biography ==
Born in Kabul, Afghanistan, Sadeed came to the United States following the Soviet invasion of her native country. After her husband died in 1993 she founded the non-profit organization Help the Afghan Children (HTAC) to help the people of Afghanistan. The goal of HTAC is to educate women and children in countries under Taliban rule.

In 2002 a documentary was made about Sadeed, titled "Inshallah: Diary of an Afghan Woman", directed by Randall Scerbo Truitner. The film chronicles Sadeed on two trips to deliver aid in remote areas of Pakistan and Afghanistan, and aired on Oprah Winfrey's Oxygen network

In 2011 Sadeed released an autobiography Forbidden Lessons in a Kabul Guesthouse, written by Sadeed and Damien Lewis.
