= Valentina Cherevatenko =

Valentina Ivanovna Cherevatenko (Russian: Валент́ина Ив́ановна Черев́атенко) is a veteran of human rights and peace-building initiatives in southern Russia, the Caucasus and, more recently, Ukraine. She is the founder and chair of the Women of the Don NGO, which was set up in 1993.

In 2016 Valentina's long service to these causes was recognised by two international awards.

One was a special prize announced in October 2016, to be given concurrently with the annual Anna Politkovskaya Award. (The main 2016 prize-winner was Jineth Bedoya Lima; she and Valentina received their prizes in London on 11 March 2017.) The other award is a new prize jointly created by the French and German governments. It was awarded for the first time in December 2016 in Berlin to 15 men and women from all over the world.

Cherevatenko was given these prizes in recognition of past achievement and as a response to present harassment. The Russian government has shown its displeasure with her recent activities and those of the Women of the Don by bringing criminal charges against Valentina Cherevatenko under the 2012 Foreign Agent law. If convicted she faces a heavy fine or two years' deprivation of liberty.

In late July 2017, the charges against Cherevatenko were dropped.

== Early life ==
Valentina grew up in Novocherkassk in the Rostov Region and as a child witnessed part of the 1962 events in the city (see Novocherkassk massacre). Later in life she learned that her mother, then 23, had saved the life of a policeman during those confused and tragic days. Her father was Ukrainian; the city of Novocherkassk has many historical ties with Ukraine, as do its present inhabitants (pop. 170,233 in 2016).

== First intervention in an armed conflict, 1990 ==
Valentina's first intervention in an armed conflict came when the USSR was still in existence. Late in 1990 the army recruitment offices in Novocherkassk called up the city's middle-aged reservists, put them on airplanes and sent them to Baku, the capital of Soviet Azerbaijan.

This was not the local six-monthly training camps that such men usually attended and rumours of the continuing unrest and violence in Azerbaijan alarmed people whose husbands and fathers had now been sent there (see Baku pogrom). The director of the factory where Valentina was working gave her and her team access to his telex and they sent urgent messages to Gorbachev, Yeltsin and other decision-makers in the Soviet and RSFSR governments.

As a result, the men returned home. They had not advanced beyond the airport in Baku or engaged in combat, but some had already been killed by stray bullets.

== Creation of Women of the Don, 1993 ==
"The Union of Women of the Don is unique," wrote an OpenDemocracy profile of the organisation and its leader Valentina Cherevatenko in 2016. Set up in 1993 to help local women left unemployed in the wake of the Soviet collapse, over the past 23 years it had turned into "one of Russia’s largest human and civil rights NGOs".

== Harassment by Russian authorities, 2012 onwards ==
In 2012, after Putin's re-election as President of Russia for a third term, a law was passed that required NGOs receiving funding from abroad and engaging in "political activities" to register as Foreign Agents (see Russian foreign agent law).

Like many other long-standing non-commercial organisations, the Women of the Don refused to adopt this denigrating term or voluntarily add themselves to the Register organised by the Ministry of Justice. Pressure was then brought to bear and Cherevatenko and her colleagues decided to divide the Women of the Don into two distinct organisations, one dealing with matters at the local level (the Union of the Women of the Don, operating in the Rostov Region), and the other operating in Russia and abroad (the "Women of the Don" Foundation for Civil Society and Human Rights).

The Union of the Women of the Don was, nevertheless, declared a Foreign Agent in 2014. Two years later that designation was withdrawn, though it still applied to the companion Women of the Don Foundation. In June 2016 charges were brought against Valentina Cherevatenko herself (see below).

== Contacts with Nadia Savchenko, 2015-2016 ==
In her role as a member of the Public Oversight Agency for places of confinement run by the Federal Penitentiary Service in the Rostov Region Valentina paid regular visits to the jailed Ukrainian airforce pilot Nadia Savchenko after she was moved to the Novocherkassk pre-trial detention centre in July 2015. Savchenko was held there before and after her conviction at the trial in Rostov in March 2016.

During this period Cherevatenko kept the media informed about Savchenko's health—she was then refusing to eat or drink—and Valentina's reports were published in a variety of outlets, before and after the trial when Savchenko was due for transfer to a penal colony.

As a consequence of this behaviour Cherevatenko lost her position with the Oversight Agency.

== People's diplomacy and the Minsk Accords ==
On 24 July 2015 Valentina and the Women of the Don suggested, in an address to the Presidential Council on Civil Society and Human Rights, that people's diplomacy should also become part of the Minsk Agreements, establishing terms for ending armed conflict in eastern Ukraine and ensuring respect for the agreements on all sides.

Cherevatenko said that such preliminary meetings had already taken place between women from Ukraine and Russia, involving journalists, members of NGOs and action groups; specialists—such as psychologists, doctors and others—were also ready to help individuals, and support the process of dialogue. "A great many initiatives are already being implemented," she said: "to overcome the breakdown in [formerly] close relations, to withstand propaganda and aid the formation of a critical approach, and to help those suffering from the effects of post-traumatic stress".

== Charges against Cherevatenko, 2016-2017 ==
In late June 2016 Valentina Cherevatenko was the first individual against whom a criminal investigation was formally opened under the 2012 law on "foreign agent" NGOs. She was accused of "malicious evasion” of the duties imposed on “NGOs that perform the functions of a foreign agent", and if convicted could pay a heavy fine or be given a two-year sentence in a penal colony. This attack on a prominent, veteran rights defender aroused concern in Russia and abroad.

On 2 June 2017 Cherevatenko was formally charged with the above-mentioned offence, and now awaits a date for a court hearing of her case.

Two months later the charges were dropped.

== See also ==
- Baku 1990
- First Chechen War
- Russian "Foreign-Agent" Law
- Novocherkassk events, 1962
- Ukraine conflict, 2014 to present

== External sources ==
- Women of the Don NGO (in Russian).
- Women of the Don - Statute of incorporation, 2013 (in English).
- "Rights in Russia" news website.
