= Natalya Estemirova =

Russian human rights activist (1958–2009)

- Наталья Эстемирова
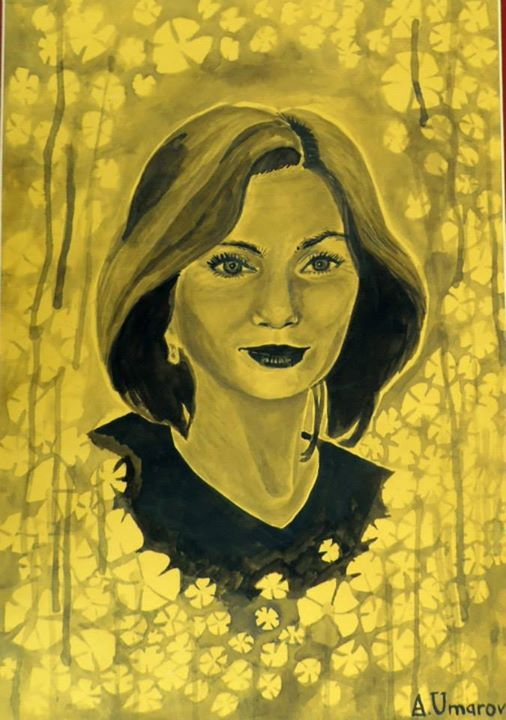
- Posthumous portrait of Estemirova by Chechen painter Asya Umarova
- Born: 28 February 1958; Kamyshlov, Sverdlovsk Oblast, Russian SFSR, Soviet Union
- Died: 15 July 2009 (aged 51); Gazi-Yurt, Ingushetia, Russia
- Cause of death: Assassination
- Education: Grozny University
- Occupations: Human rights activist, journalist, teacher
- Board member of: Memorial (society)
- Awards: Right Livelihood Award; Robert Schuman Medal, EPP Group; Anna Politkovskaya Award

Natalya Khusainovna Estemirova (Russian: Наталья Хусаиновна Эстемирова, Chechen: Наталья Хусайнан йоI Эстемирова; 28 February 1958 – 15 July 2009) was a Russian human rights activist and board member of the Russian human rights organization Memorial. Estemirova was abducted by an unknown group of people on 15 July 2009 around 8:30 a.m. from her home in Grozny, Chechnya, as she was working on "extremely sensitive" cases of human rights abuses in Chechnya. Two witnesses reported they saw Estemirova being forced into a car shouting that she was being abducted. Her remains were later found with bullet wounds in the head and chest area at 4:30 p.m. in woodland 100 metres (330 ft) away from the federal road "Kavkaz" near the village of Gazi-Yurt, Ingushetia.

== Biography ==
Born in Kamyshlov, Sverdlovsk Oblast to Russian and Chechen parents, Estemirova graduated with a history degree from Grozny University and taught history in a local high school until 1998. In 1991, she worked as a correspondent for the local newspapers The Voice and The Worker of Grozny. While working on TV in Grozny, she filmed thirteen short documentaries about victims of the Russian punitive practices. She participated in the Organization of Filtration Camps Inmates as a press secretary. The widow of a Chechen policeman, she gathered evidence on human rights violations since the beginning of the Second Chechen war in 1999, leaving her daughter in Yekaterinburg with relatives. In 2000, she became a representative for the Memorial Human Rights Centre in her native Grozny. She visited many hospitals in Chechnya and Ingushetia, taking hundreds of photographs of child victims of the war.

Estemirova was a frequent contributor to the independent Moscow newspaper Novaya Gazeta and the Caucasus news website Kavkazsky Uzel.

Estemirova received the Right Livelihood Award as a representative of Memorial at a ceremony in the Swedish parliament building in 2004. Along with Sergey Kovalyov, chairman of Memorial, she was awarded the Robert Schuman Medal by the Group of the European People's Party in 2005. In October 2007, she was awarded the first Anna Politkovskaya Award, honouring brave women human rights defenders from war and conflict, who speaks up for the victims, who are often at a great personal risk. The Anna Politkovskaya Award is presented annually to honour the memory of Russian investigative journalist Anna Politkovskaya on the anniversary of her murder on 7 October 2006, by Reach All Women in War (RAW), an international human rights organization supporting women human rights defenders in war and conflict zones. Estemirova worked together with investigative journalist Anna Politkovskaya and human rights lawyer Stanislav Markelov, both of whom were also murdered, in 2006 and 2009, respectively. According to colleagues, a significant portion of Politkovskaya's reports were based on information gathered by Estemirova, who was not credited in order to protect her from reprisals.

In 2008, Estemirova publicly condemned efforts by Chechen authorities to force women to wear headscarves in public. Her statements reportedly angered Ramzan Kadyrov, the head of the Chechen Republic, who summoned her to a personal meeting and threatened her. Following the meeting Estemirova left Chechnya for several months on the advice of her colleagues, but she eventually returned.

== Assassination ==
Estemirova was abducted on 15 July 2009 from her home in Grozny, Chechnya. According to Tanya Lokshina of the Moscow bureau of Human Rights Watch, an unknown group of individuals abducted Estemirova near her house in Grozny at around 8:30 a.m. Her colleagues raised an alert when she did not come to a planned meeting and went to her home, found witnesses and questioned them. Two witnesses reportedly saw Estemirova being forced into a car while shouting that she was being abducted. Lokshina said Estemirova was abducted as she was working on "extremely sensitive" cases of human rights abuses in Chechnya. Lokshina said that she had been targeted for her professional activities. Human Rights Watch had demanded the Kremlin and Ramzan Kadyrov to return Estemirova home safely.

Vladimir Markin, press secretary for the investigative committee of the Prosecutor General of Russia, said a body of a woman with bullet wounds in the head and chest was found at 4:30 p.m. in woodland 100 m away from the federal road "Kavkaz" near the village of Gazi-Yurt, Ingushetia. Investigators found items belonging to Estemirova in the purse of the woman. These items were a passport, an ID of the Chechnya expert for the Human Rights Commissioner of Russia and the mandate of the penitentiary supervision public committee.

== Funeral ==
Estemirova was "buried in line with Islamic tradition before sunset on Thursday, in a cemetery in her ancestral village, Koshkeldy, in Chechnya's Gudermes district."

About 150 people attended a vigil that was held in Moscow's Pushkin Square about nine days after the murder, following Russian Orthodox tradition. After all but twenty people had left, police arrested the organizer of the event, Viktor Sotirko of Memorial. He was held for two hours and charged with disturbing the peace. Police said only 30 people had been sanctioned to attend the event, but far more had shown up.

== Response ==
The BBC's Rupert Wingfield-Hayes, stationed in Moscow, reported that Estemirova was engaged in "very important and dangerous work", investigating hundreds of cases of alleged kidnappings, torture and extrajudicial killings by Russian government troops or paramilitaries in Chechnya.

Russian President Dmitri Medvedev expressed "outrage" at the murder and ordered a top-level investigation. Speaking in Germany at the time of her funeral, he paid tribute to her and again pledged a thorough investigation. He said it was "obvious" to him that her murder was linked to her professional work.

Memorial claimed that "state terror" was to blame, calling the killing an "extrajudicial execution" by government-backed death squads. Memorial's chairman Oleg Orlov said that Ramzan Kadyrov threatened Natalya and that Russian president Medvedev was content with Kadyrov being a murderer. Orlov said in a statement: "I know, I am sure who is guilty of Natalya Estemirova's murder, we all know him. His name is Ramzan Kadyrov." According to Orlov, shortly before the murder Kadyrov made an open threat to her by saying: "Yes, my hands are up to the elbows in blood. And I am not ashamed of that. I killed and will kill bad people". Kadyrov denied any involvement and promised to investigate the killing personally. He condemned the killers, saying they "must be punished as the cruelest of criminals". It was later reported that in response to Orlov's accusation, Kadyrov would be suing the rights group for defamation, and would target Orlov personally in the complaint. Nurdi Nukhazhiyev, Chechen human rights ombudsman, called Orlov's accusation "groundless and ludicrous".

In January 2010, Ramzan Kadyrov, in an interview to Russia Today accused Boris Berezovsky of murdering Estemirova. Despite expressing confidence that the crime would be solved, he acknowledged that as of that date it had not:

Estemirova's murder was provoked by the people who murdered Politkovskaya and Litvinenko. I am pretty sure that that's Berezovsky's job. Politkovskaya was speaking about Chechnya all the time. When everything became fine in our republic, and there was nothing to blame us for, was the perfect time to kill her and shift the blame on Kadyrov to undermine the system.

Medvedev responded to the accusation, saying the timing of the crime, a day before his trip to Germany for talks with Chancellor Angela Merkel, was a provocation intended to give rise to "the most primitive theories and those most disagreeable to the state". Merkel said she expressed her "outrage" over the killing in her talks with Medvedev "and made clear that everything must be done to solve this crime".

United Nations Secretary-General Ban Ki-moon said he was "appalled and saddened" by Estemirova's murder. UN spokeswoman Marie Okabe stated that Ban "urges the Russian authorities to conduct a thorough and impartial investigation in order to bring the perpetrators of this heinous killing to justice, and by doing so, to send a strong and unambiguous message that the targeting of human rights activists will not be tolerated". The chairman of the EPP Group in the European Parliament, Joseph Daul, condemned the perpetrators and called for an investigation and bringing the perpetrators to trial.

The Sweden-based human rights organization Civil Rights Defenders named the Natalia Project after Estemirova. The Natalia Project is an alarm and positioning system for human rights defenders at risk.

== Investigation ==
In February 2010, an anonymous source in the Russian law enforcement bodies claimed that investigators knew Estemirova's murderer. Yet, the murderer wasn't caught, nor was the organizer of the crime identified.

Journalists of Novaya Gazeta together with the human rights society Memorial and the International Federation for Human Rights are conducting their own investigation, they also monitor the official investigation. According to them, the main version of the official investigators is that Estemirova was murdered by rebel Alkhazur Bashayev, a member of a jamaat in the Chechen village of Shalazhy (Шалажи). On 15 January 2010, during a search in the house of Alkhazur Bashayev, the investigators found a large stockpile of weapons, including the handgun that was used to murder Estemirova and a counterfeit police id with a photograph of Bashayev. On 7 February 2010, they found an abandoned VAZ-2107 car that was identified as the car bought by Bashayev. In the car, they found a suppressor made of the same material as the fragment found on the crime scene. The plant fragments found on the suspension on the car were similar to the plants found at the crime scene.

According to the official investigators, Bashayev was trying to smear Kadyrov and the leadership of the Chechen Republic, and he might also have been upset by publications by Estemirova where she had alleged that Bashayev had been recruiting for the rebel group without any opposition of the officials and suggested that he might be an agent for Kadyrovtsy.

According to the official information, on 13 November 2009, Bashayev was killed by an air strike during a special operation led by Adam Delimkhanov.

Novaya Gazeta journalists and human rights activists disagree with the conclusions of the investigators and suspect a massive cover-up:

- The DNA analysis of materials found on the crime scene is not matched to Alkhazur Bashayev or his relatives.
- The relations between Bashayev and official Kadyrovtsy are very dubious.
- The killing of Bashayev is not proven. Quite possible that he is alive and the information of his deaths were cover-up.
- It is probable that the handgun was put into Bashayev's house after Bashayev's death.

== See also ==
- List of journalists killed in Russia
- Freedom of the press in Russia
- Media freedom in Russia
- Russian mafia
