= Control Arms Foundation of India =

- Predecessor: India Working Group on Arms Control (IWGAC)
- Formation: 2004
- Founder: Binalakshmi Nepram
- Purpose: Promote gun control
- Location: New Delhi

Control Arms Foundation of India is a New Delhi–based gun control organisation co-founded in 2004 by activist Binalakshmi Nepram to curb armed violence caused by the proliferation of small arms and improvised explosive devices.

The organisation was formerly known as India Working Group on Arms Control (IWGAC).
