= Gazi-Yurt =

Gazi-Yurt Гази-Юрт
- Selo

Other transcription(s)
  - Ingush: ГӀаьзе-Коа
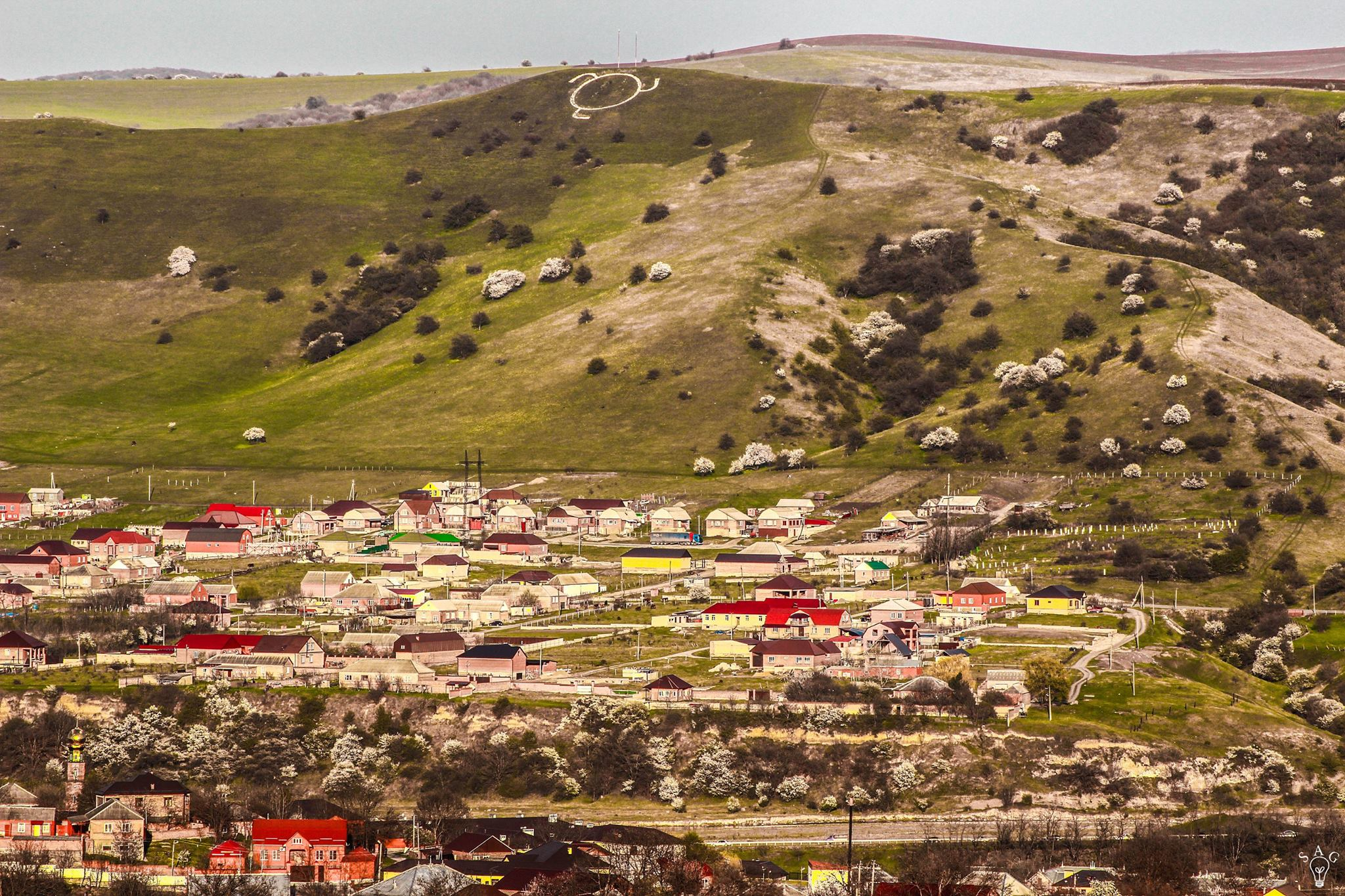
- View of Gazi-Yurt
- Interactive map of Gazi-Yurt
- Location of Gazi-Yurt Gazi-Yurt (Republic of Ingushetia)
- Coordinates: 43°15′39″N 44°50′26″E
- Country: Russia
- Federal subject: Ingushetia
- Administrative district: Nazranovsky District
- Elevation: 501 m (1,644 ft)

Population (2010 Census)
  - Total: 1,650
  - Estimate (2025): 2,699 (+63.6%)
- Time zone: UTC+3 (MSK)
- Postal code: 366318
- OKTMO ID: 26605440101

Gazi-Yurt (Russian: Гази-Юрт; Ingush: ГӀаьзе-Коа, romanized: Ghäze-Koa) is a rural locality (a selo) in the Nazranovsky District in Ingushetia, Russia. Population: 1,650 (2010 census);

== History ==
According to one journal, the village was once part of ancient Maghas, the capital of the medieval polyethnic state of Alania. This complex of ancient settlements, known as "Yandare-Gazi-Yurt-Ekazhevo-Ali-Yurt-Surkhakhi," consisted of early medieval fortresses and numerous settlements that formed a single fortified area. Archaeological evidence suggests that the area was once home to about 30 settlements and numerous burial monuments from the Alanian period.

The fortified region was strategically located on a natural hill that was convenient for defense, with rivers to the west and north and the Sunzhensky Range to the north, as well as the deep Assinskoye Gorge to the east and the wooded ridges of the Black Mountains to the south. The settlements formed several defensive belts around the central part, where the largest settlement, "Khatoi-Borz", was located. This central part was also believed to be the former citadel of ancient Magas.

In 1944, after the deportation of the Ingush and the abolition of the Chechen-Ingush Autonomous Soviet Socialist Republic, the village was renamed Zarechnoye. However, in 1958, the settlement was restored to its former name of Gazi-Yurt after the restoration of the Chechen-Ingush Autonomous Soviet Socialist Republic.

On July 15, 2009, the Russian journalist and human rights activist, Natalya Estemirova, was killed in Gazi-Yurt.

== Geography ==
The village of Gazi-Yurt is situated on the right bank of the Sunzha River, approximately 1.5 km northeast of the regional center city of Nazran and 9 km north of Magas. It is surrounded by several neighboring settlements including Barsuki to the west, Plievo to the north, Yandare to the northeast, Surkhakhi to the southeast, and Ekazhevo to the southwest.

=== Infrastructure ===
Gazi-Yurt has several important infrastructure facilities, including an Administration House and a municipal secondary school.
