= Binalakshmi Nepram =

Indian humanitarian, author, and feminist activist

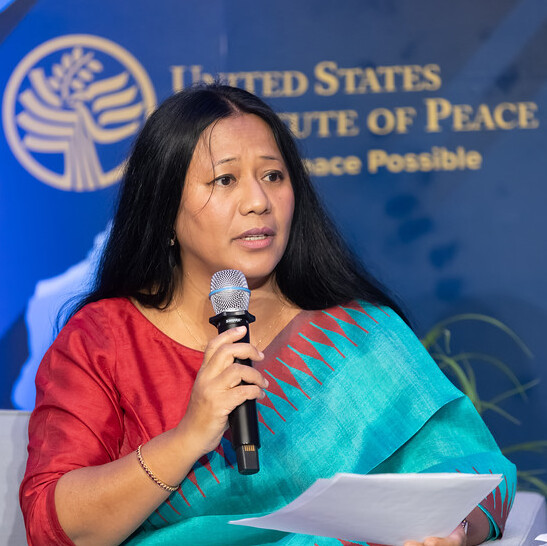
- Nepram in November 2023
- Born: Imphal, Manipur, India
- Occupations: Humanitarian, author and civil rights activist of a disarmament movement
- Years active: From 2004
- Known for: Founder of Control Arms Foundation of India (CAFI), 2004, and Manipur Women Gun Survivors Network (MWGSN)

Binalakshmi Nepram is an Indian humanitarian, author, and female activist for the advocacy of gender rights and women-led disarmament movements with the objective of arresting gun culture and bringing about peace for her home state of Manipur in particular and northeast India in general. For her contributions in this field to Manipur and northeast India she is known by the epithet "The Face & Voice of North East".

Nepram has established many institutions such as the Control Arms Foundation of India (CAFI) in 2004, and Manipur Women Gun Survivors Network (MWGSN).

On the disarmament issue she opines, "You cannot shoot an unarmed person. This goes for both the State and non State actors... nonviolence will win at the end."

Forbes named Nepram as one of its "24 Young Minds to Watch out for in 2015", and the Action on Armed Violence of London listed her among the top 100 influential people in the world actively pursuing a reduction in armed violence.

== Biography ==
Nepram was born in Imphal, Manipur, northeast India. Her parents are Nepram Bihari and Yensembam Ibemhal. She grew up in Imphal in an atmosphere of violence and bloodshed which shaped her future work, and there was even a general curfew in Imphal imposed by the army when she was born. She did her schooling in Imphal and obtained a second rank in her High School Leaving Certificate (HSLC) examination, for which she received the Amusana and Gouro Memorial Award. She holds a master's degree in history from the Delhi University and a Master of Philosophy (M.Phil) degree in South Asian studies in international relations from the Jawaharlal Nehru University (JNU).

During her research stints in JNU she became aware of the seriousness of violence in her home state. Her research was influenced by the book Trafficking in Small Arms and Sensitive Technologies and a White Paper related to small arms issued by the Canadian government which had a lasting impact on her. Her two years of research in JNU resulted in the publication titled South Asia's Fractured Frontier (2002) and she continued to work on her favourite subject of "Small Arms and Light Weapons (UNPoA)". In 2004, she was instrumental in establishing the Control Arms Foundation of India (CAFI) in New Delhi with the objective of study of conventional disarmament issues as relevant to the increase in the use of small arms and light weapons that was detrimental to the social groups, in particular to women, children and old people.

In 2004, she was disturbed when Buddha Moirangthem, owner of a car-battery workshop in Wabagai Lamkhai village of Thoubal district, was gunned down by unidentified persons for no known reason, and his wife never came to know who did it and why. There were several such incidents in Manipur which disturbed Nepram and prompted her to return to Imphal and establish the Manipur Women Gun Survivors Network (MWGSN) in 2007 with the primary objective of providing financial and other type of assistance to the female dependents of the people who were gunned down.

In 2004, Nepram co-established the Control Arms Foundation of India which is the first of its kind in India dealing with conventional disarmament issues. In 2007, she took pioneering action to institute an organization in Manipur to help the many who have suffered due to gun violence. She also started the Manipuri Women Gun Survivor Network. She has participated in many conferences related to disarmament and also in the United Nations in New York City.

== Fellowships and awards ==
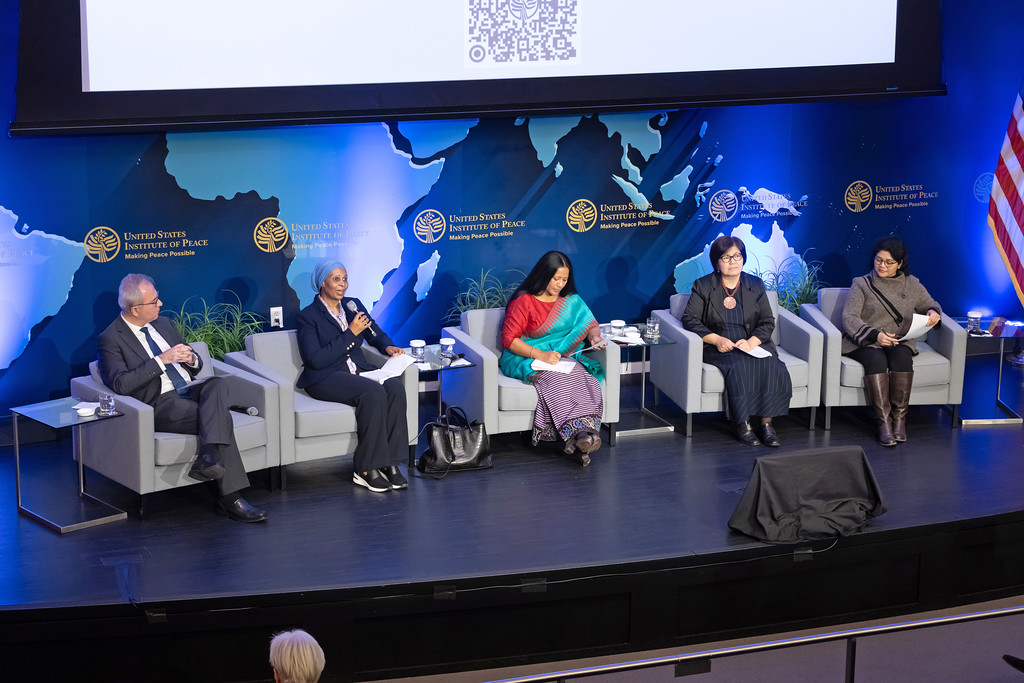
RISE Action Guide Launch Symposium at the United States Institute of Peace in 2023

Nepram is the recipient of the Ploughshares fellowship to pursue research on small arms mitigation in the Indo-Myanmar/Burma region. She has also received the Dalai Lama Foundation's WISCOMP Scholar of Peace Award for her research work in conflict resolution and peace process of specific relevance to "women and micro-disarmament".

Nepram is the recipient of several national and international awards for her efforts to rehabilitate oppressed women and sufferers of armed conflict in Manipur and North East Region. Some of the notable awards are Best Humanitarian Initiative of the Year 2010, the Sean MacBride Peace Prize for disarmament work in 2011, the CNN IBN Real Heroes Award in 2011, Ashoka Fellowship by the Ashoka: Innovators of the Public of Washington, and the L’Oréal Paris Femina Women Award 2015 under the category of "Face of A Cause".

On Thursday 4 October 2018, RAW in WAR (Reach All Women in WAR) honoured Binalakshmi Nepram, a courageous human rights defender from the war-torn Indian state of Manipur with the 2018 Anna Politkovskaya Award, which she shared with Belarusian writer and 2015 Nobel Prize winner in literature, Svetlana Alexievich.

== Publications ==
Nepram has published several research papers and four books: Poetic Festoon (1990), South Asia's Fractured Frontier: Armed Conflict, Narcotics and Small Arms Proliferation in India's Northeast (2002), Meckley (2004) based on unrest in Manipur, and India and the Arms Trade Treaty (2009).
