= Lucy Kassa =

Ethiopian journalist

- Occupations: Journalist, human rights defender
- Awards: Amnesty International UK Media Awards (2022); Anna Politkovskaya Award (2023)

Lucy Kassa (in Amharic: ሉሲ ካሳ (Lusī Kāsa)) is an Ethiopian journalist and war correspondent. For her coverage of the Tigray War, where she exposed to major global media outlets about the atrocities committed by the Ethiopian government and all other warring parties, particularly civilian massacres, weaponised sexual violence, concentration camps and other serious war crimes, she received international recognition and influenced international reactions from the UN and Western Parliaments.

== Biography ==
Kassa originally wrote as a journalist on development, political and economic issues.

However, with the outbreak of war in Tigray Region in November 2020, she began documenting war crimes. The journalist faced numerous threats and an attack at her home, during which security agents confiscated her computer and investigative evidences. She then decided to leave Ethiopia. She has since lived in Europe, but does not share specific details about her location for security reasons.

== Work ==
Through her work, Kassa drew international attention to the victims of the war and the suffering of the civilian population, particularly women and children. Her investigative articles, notably in The Guardian, BBC, Los Angeles Times (LA Times), Al Jazeera Media Network (Al Jazeera), The Daily Telegraph (The Telegraph), VICE World News, The Globe and Mail, and many other major global media outlets exposed crimes such as war crimes, crimes against humanity, ethnic cleansing, massacres, weaponised sexual violence, and grave human rights violations. Kassa countered misinformation and propaganda, uncovered hidden atrocities committed by all parties in the conflict, and thus influenced international reactions, including sanctions against war criminals. Her contributions to investigative journalism have received several awards, including the Amnesty International Media Awards, The Magnitsky Award, the Anna Politkovskaya Award and have been mentioned notably in British parliamentary debates and in a U.S. Senate resolution. In 2022–2023, she received the Anna Politkovskaya Award and the Amnesty Media Award.
