= Halima Bashir =

Sudanese writer and physician

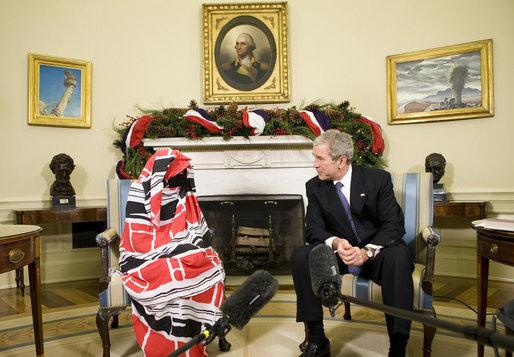
- Bashir meeting President George W. Bush in 2008
- Occupation: Doctor/writer
- Spouse: Sharif Bashir
- Children: 2
- Writing career
- Pen name: Halima Bashir
- Genre: Autobiography
- Notable work: Tears of the Desert
- Notable awards: Anna Politkovskaya Award 2010

Halima Bashir (Arabic: حليمة بشير) is the fictitious name of a Sudanese medical doctor, who is the author of Tears of the Desert, a memoir about women's experiences with genocide and war in Darfur. She worked as a doctor in rural Sudan, before being abused at the hands of the National Intelligence and Security Service after reporting truthfully to United Nations officials about an attack by the Janjaweed militia on a nearby school. She has since moved to the United Kingdom, where she claimed asylum.

== Life ==
Halima Bashir, a pseudonym later adopted to protect her, grew up in rural Darfur in Western Sudan. She was the oldest of four children, and did well in school. At the age of eight, she underwent female circumcision. A special meal was held, and she was given money, before being held down in the hut of her grandmother while a razor without anaesthetic was used to cut off any external genitalia.

Her father was supportive when she trained to become a doctor; her father was wealthy enough to send her to a city school, where she excelled as a student. She completed her training just prior to the start of the genocide and War in Darfur. While she was posted in a clinic, she gave an interview in which she disagreed with the official position of the Sudanese government. In response, she was detained and threatened by the authorities, before being posted to a rural clinic in North Darfur and warned not to speak to western journalists.

At her new clinic, she found herself treating the victims of the Janjaweed militia, including 42 school girls who had been gang-raped in a government supported attack on the village. She later explained, "At no stage in my years of study had I been taught how to deal with 8-year-old victims of gang rape in a rural clinic without enough sutures to go around." When two officials from the United Nations came to gather information about the attack, Bashir told them the truth. In response, she was taken by the National Intelligence and Security Service, and was gang raped, cut with knives and burned with cigarettes repeatedly over the course of several days. She was released and returned to her village, where her father arranged for her to be married to her cousin Sharif, who she had only met once before. He had chosen Sharif, because he was viewed as being progressive. The village was attacked shortly afterwards, resulting in the death of her father and the disappearance of her siblings.

For speaking out about this attack to United Nations investigators, Bashir herself was brutally tortured and raped. When she returned to her home village, it had been destroyed by government helicopters and Janjaweed militia. Shortly after, Halima fled the country for fear of the government still hunting her.

== Journey overseas and writing ==
Bashir left Sudan and travelled to the United Kingdom to claim asylum, she had paid a people trafficker with jewellery. While in the UK, she protested the country's lack of action against Sudan, handing a letter personally to Lord David Triesman, the Minister for Africa within the British government. She wrote an autobiography, Tears of the Desert, in collaboration with Damien Lewis, published in 2008.

== Tears of the Desert ==
Halima Bashir
- Author: Halima Bashir and Damien Lewis
- Subject: Darfur genocide
- Genre: Memoir
- Publisher: Oneworld Publications and Ballantine Books
- Publication date: September 9, 2008
- ISBN: 978-0-345-50625-2

Tears of the Desert: A Memoir of Survival in Darfur is an autobiographical book co-written by Bashir and English journalist Damien Lewis. This autobiography gives an account of Bashir's life in the Darfur region of Sudan, marked by personal experience of civil war, genocide, sexual violence and murder. As a result of speaking out about the torture of her compatriots inflicted by Janjaweed militias, Bashir applied for political asylum in the United Kingdom.

In her book, she has changed names and places. However, independent verification by The New York Times has demonstrated the facts appear without any exaggeration. The newspaper also campaigned for Bashir to be granted a visa for entry into the United States. In 2010, she was awarded the Anna Politkovskaya Award for speaking out about the Janjaweed's violent attacks on school girls in Darfur.

=== Synopsis ===
When Halima attends secondary school in the city, she comes up against traditional enmities between the black Africans of Darfur and the minority Arab elite and their group's subsequent discrimination against the black Africans ever since. She further speaks about the lack of support from teachers in physical fights stemming from prejudices against schoolgirls, which leads to expulsion – all of it an early lesson in helplessness.

=== Aim of the novel ===
Co-author Damien Lewis stated that one of his goals was to, "make (…) you or I or anybody else in the West feel that that could be them (…) how would they feel, if that happened to them, brings it home to on the personal human family level. What would you feel, if it was your children or your father, or your grandparents, or your village? (…) So it doesn't feel like thousands of miles away in a different culture in a place we don't understand".

=== Critical reception ===
Kirkus Reviews called Tears of the Desert "both heartrending and chilling." Publishers Weekly expanded on the idea, saying the book "offers a vivid personal portrait of life in the Darfur region of Sudan before the catastrophe," and "the violence the author recounts is harrowing."

Booklist also reviewed Tears of the Desert.
