= Kholoud Helmi =

Syrian journalist

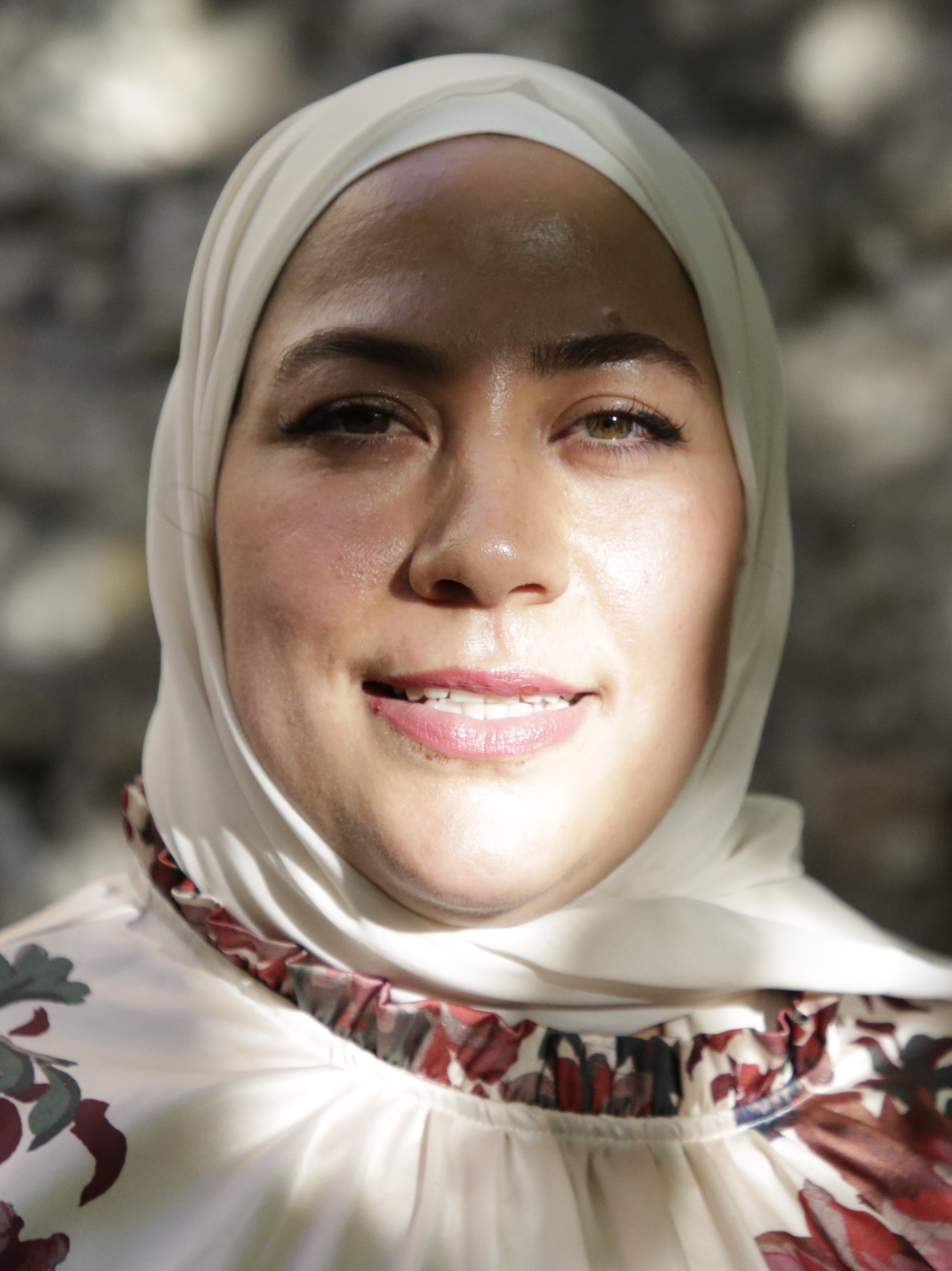
- Kholoud Helmi 2026
- Born: 1984 (age 41–42); Darayya, Syria
- Education: Damascus University
- Employer: newspaper Enab Baladi.
- Known for: journalist Anna Politkovskaya Award for her reporting about the Syrian Civil War

Kholoud Waleed Helmi (Arabic: خلود وليد حلمي; born in 1984 in Darayya) is a Syrian journalist, co-founder and editor of the independent newspaper Enab Baladi. She is a recipient of the Anna Politkovskaya Award for her reporting about the Syrian Civil War.

== Early life ==
Helmi grew up in Darayya and studied English Literature at Damascus University before becoming a teacher in her native Syria. As a result of the Darayya massacre, she left the town and fled to the countryside with her family.

== Work as journalist and activism ==
Not having any journalistic training, Helmi teamed up with friends to report about civil war in Syria. As their work gained momentum, these citizen journalists created the underground newspaper Enab Baladi with the intention of reporting the "voice of the vulnerable".

Helmi and the newspaper claim that they have been subject to threats from multiple parties involved in the war which prompted her to live in hiding. Her brother was arrested by government forces in 2012 and his fate is unknown. For a period of time she was exiled in Turkey.

Despite this, she also organised demonstrations, demanding democracy and free speech as well as highlighting human rights abuses. In 2015 she was awarded the Anna Politkovskaya Award for her continued efforts as a journalist.
