= Anna Politkovskaya Award =

British human rights award

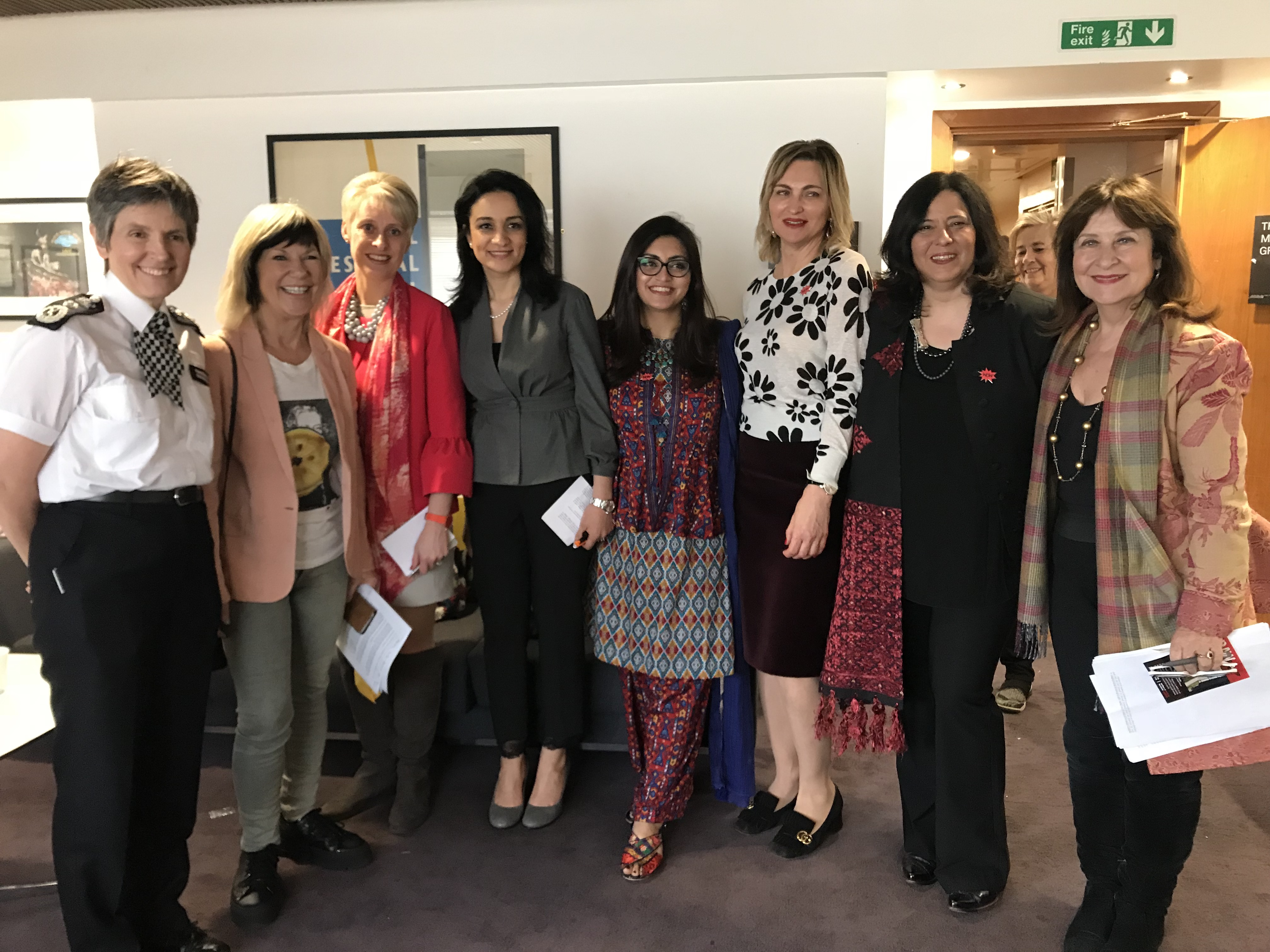
Gulalai Ismail (center) received the 2017 Anna Politkovskaya Award at the Women of the World Festival at the Royal Festival Hall in London.

The Anna Politkovskaya Award was established in 2006 to remember and honor the Russian journalist Anna Politkovskaya (1958–2006), murdered in Moscow on 7 October 2006 in order to silence her reporting about the war in Chechnya.

The award is presented annually by the international human rights organisation RAW in WAR (Reach All Women in War), and honours women human rights defenders from around the world, who work in war and conflict zones, often at great personal risk. Mariana Katzarova, a friend and a human rights colleague of Politkovskaya, founded RAW in WAR (Reach All Women in WAR) and the Anna Politkovskaya Award in 2006 in London, after being a journalist and human rights advocate in the war zones of Kosovo, Bosnia and Chechnya.

In 2016, to mark the tenth anniversary of the murder of Anna Politkovskaya, an additional special award was presented to a woman human rights defender from Russia who, like Anna Politkovskaya and the first winner of the award, Natalia Estemirova, who was murdered in Chechnya in 2009, has worked to build peace in conflict zones and help civilians trapped between opposing armed forces. The special award was presented to Valentina Cherevatenko who, since 1990, has intervened in a succession of conflicts in the former Soviet Union, working through her organisation, the Women of the Don NGO.

In October 2018, ahead of the 12th anniversary of the murder of Anna Politkovskaya, RAW in WAR presented the 2018 Anna Politkovskaya Award to Binalakshmi Nepram, a courageous indigenous human rights defender and author from the state of Manipur, on the Indo-Myanmar border area, and Svetlana Alexievich, a writer and investigative journalist from Belarus and the 2015 Nobel Prize laureate in literature.

A group of more than 100 influential cultural and political leaders joined the Committee of Supporters for the RAW in WAR Anna Politkovskaya Award. Among them are:

- Nobel Women's Initiative
- Mairead Maguire (Nobel Peace Prize Laureate)
- Betty Williams (Nobel Peace Prize Laureate)
- Jody Williams (Nobel Peace Prize Laureate)
- Shirin Ebadi (Nobel Peace Prize Laureate)
- Rigoberta Menchú Tum (Nobel Peace Prize Laureate)
- Archbishop Desmond Tutu (Nobel Peace Prize Laureate)
- Tatiana Yankelevich
- Václav Havel
- Jon Snow
- John Pilger
- Amy Goodman
- Jeremy Bowen
- Andre Glucksmann
- Gloria Steinem
- Sergey Kovalyov
- Alexei Simonov
- Vladimir Bukovsky
- Svetlana Gannushkina
- Lyudmila Alekseeva
- Karinna Moskalenko
- Lyse Doucet
- Lindsey Hilsum
- Gillian Slovo
- Eva Hoffman
- Adam Michnik
- Oleg Panfilov
- Tom Stoppard
- Bernard-Henri Lévy
- Natasha Kandic
- Elisabeth Rehn
- Zbigniew Brzezinski
- Mariane Pearl
- Azar Nafisi
- Asma Jahangir
- Carl Gershman
- Hina Jilani
- Susan Sarandon
- Jane Birkin
- Sophie Shihab
- Naomi Klein
- Sister Helen Prejean
- Ariel Dorfman
- Vanessa Redgrave
- Eve Ensler
- Michael Cunningham
- John Sweeney
- Jonathan Schell
- Noam Chomsky
- Marina Litvinenko
- Lucy Ash
- Sussan Deyhim
- Heidi Bradner
- Desmond O'Malley
- Anne Nivat
- Annabel Markova
- Lord Frank Judd
- Lord Nicolas Rea
- Shirley Williams
- Lord Anthony Giddens
- Lord Nazir Ahmed
- Baroness Molly Meacher
- Baroness Vivien Stern
- Baroness Helena Kennedy QC
- Dame Evelyn Glennie
- Yakin Erturk
- Elena Kudimova
- Andrey Nekrasov
- Peter Gabriel
- Stina Scott
- Anna Stavitskaya
- Dubravka Ugresic
- Katrina vanden Heuvel
- Victor Navasky
- Holly Near
- Joan Baez
- Elizabeth Frank
- Elizabeth Kostova
- Bill Bowring
- Irena Grudzinska Gross
- Monica Ali
- Isa Blyden
- Nayereh Tohidi
- Claire Bertschinger
- Tsvetana Maneva
- Elif Shafak

== Laureates ==
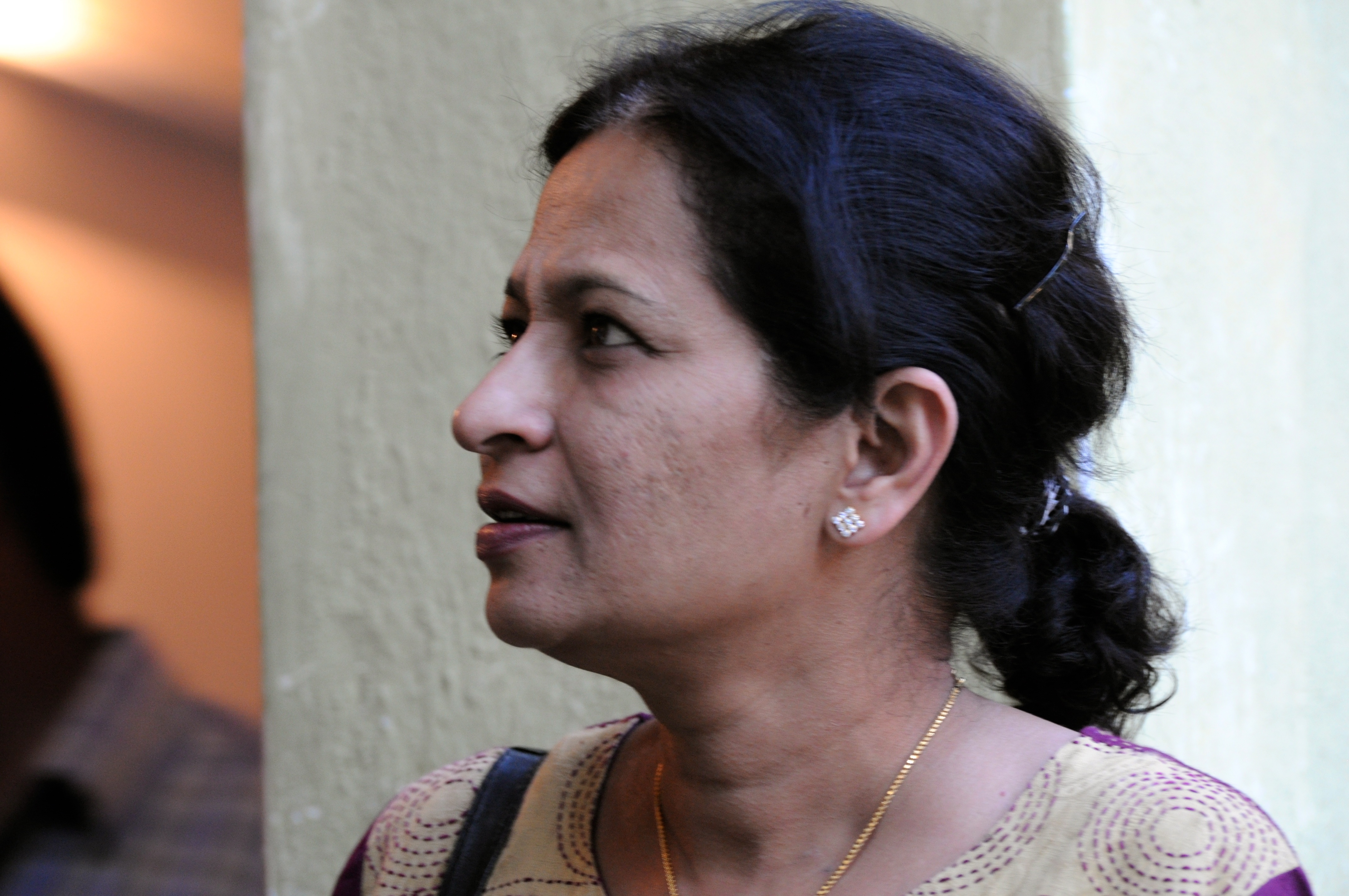
Indian journalist Gauri Lankesh, who was shot to death by unknown assailants in 2017

- 2007: Natalia Estemirova (1958–2009), Russia / Chechnya
- 2008: Malalai Joya (1978–), Afghanistan
- 2009: One Million Signatures Campaign for Equality, Iran (human rights lawyer, Leila Alikarami received the award on behalf of the One Million Signatures Campaign)
- 2010: Halima Bashir, Sudan / Darfur
- 2011: Razan Zaitouneh (1977–), Syria
- 2012: Marie Colvin (1956–2012), US
- 2013: Malala Yousafzai (1997–), Pakistan
- 2014: Vian Dakhil (1971–), Iraq
- 2015: Kholoud Waleed (1984–), Syria
- 2016: Jineth Bedoya Lima (1974–), Colombia and special 10th-anniversary award for Valentina Cherevatenko (1956–), Russia
- 2017: Gulalai Ismail (1986–), Pakistan and Gauri Lankesh (1962–2017), India
- 2018: Svetlana Alexievich (1948–), Belarus and Binalakshmi Nepram, India
- 2019: Alex Crawford (1963–), UK
- 2020: Radhya Al-Mutawakel (1967–), Yemen
- 2021: Fawzia Koofi (1975–), Afghanistan
- 2022: Tatjana Sokolowa (1958), Ukraine, and Swetlana Alexejewna Gannuschkina, Russia
- 2023: Lucy Kassa Tigray/Ethiopia
- 2024: The Palestinian women journalists in Gaza
