= Media coverage of the Syrian civil war =

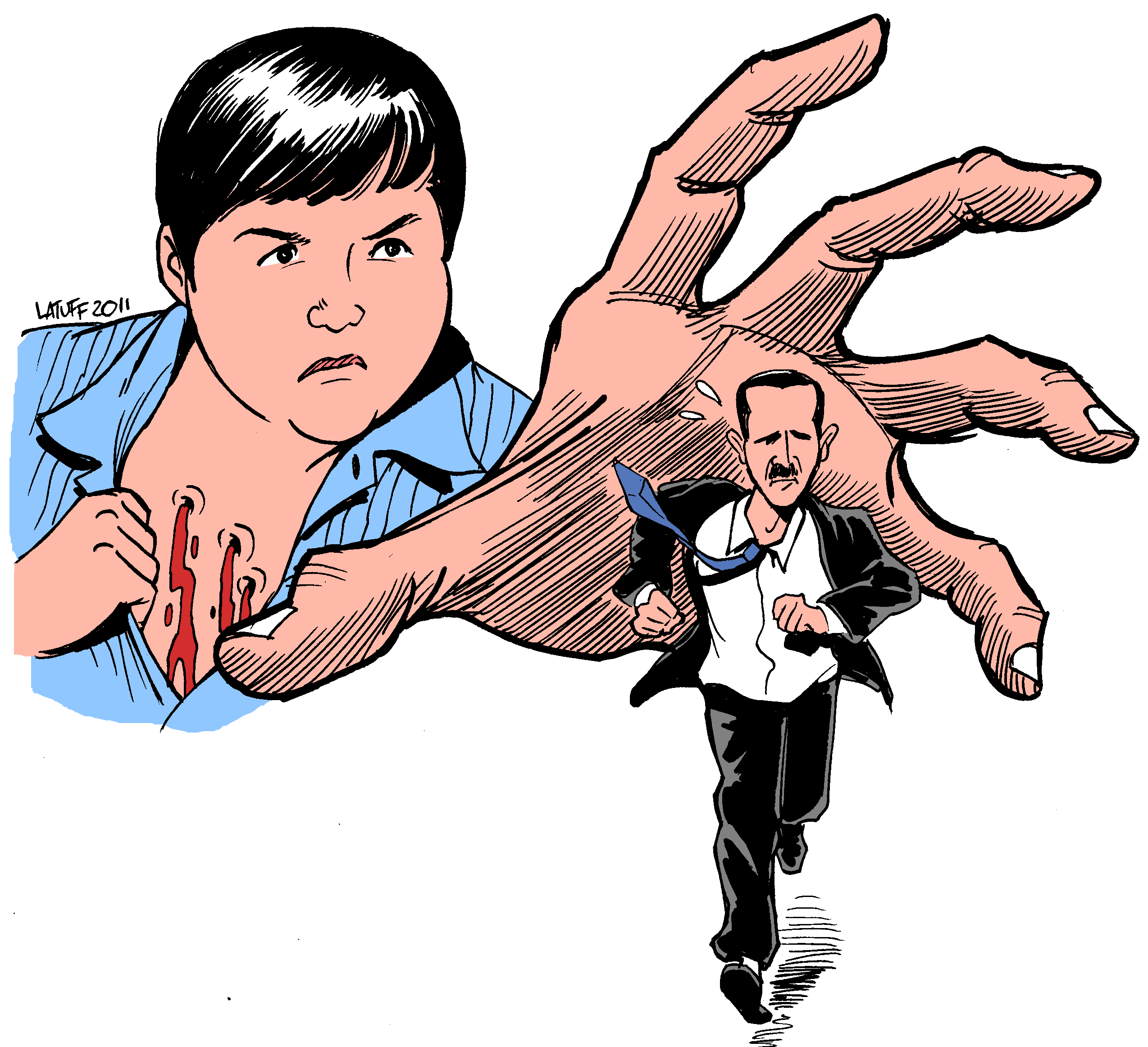
Bashar al-Assad fleeing Hamza Ali al-Khatib, the Syrian boy whose killing sparked massive protests across the country. Cartoon by Carlos Latuff

Since the start of the Syrian Civil War, all sides have used social media to try to discredit their opponents by using negative terms such as 'Syrian regime' for the government, 'armed gangs/terrorists' for the rebels, 'Syrian government/US State Department propaganda', 'biased', 'US/Western/foreign involvement'. According to the Stockholm International Peace Research Institute, given the complexity of the Syrian conflict, media bias in reporting remains a key challenge, plaguing the collection of useful data and misinforming researchers and policymakers regarding the actual events taking place.

== Internet activists ==
=== Social media ===
As in the revolutions in Tunisia and Egypt, the Internet played a major role in the organization and coverage of the protests/armed-uprising. As of 2011 the largest Facebook page in support of the Syrian uprising was "The Syrian Revolution 2011", which claimed more than 383,000 followers. The page, co-founded by Fida al-Sayed, reports on news related to the uprising and provides general guidelines for protests. As of 2020, it had more than 6.5 million followers.

- Bana Alabed, a 2016 Twitter account of unclear provenance about a child purportedly tweeting in English from Aleppo as the city was being destroyed.
- Maram Susli, a Pro Assad "activist" who claims the Syrian President is a victim of a "Zionist conspiracy"
- Many Pro Assad activists assert that the Syrian President is a target of a CIA "regime change operation". This is despite the fact that the Syrian government used to outsource torture to the CIA

=== Mobiles ===
Since international news media was banned in Syria, the main source of second-hand information/dis-information was private videos usually taken by shaky mobile phone cameras and uploaded to YouTube. Such videos were difficult to verify independently, and several TV stations showed older footage from Iraq and Lebanon, which was claimed to have been filmed in Syria.

== Visual media ==
Between January 2012 and September 2013, over a million videos documenting the war have been uploaded, and they have received hundreds of millions of views. The Wall Street Journal states that the "unprecedented confluence of two technologies—cellphone cams and social media—has produced, via the instant upload, a new phenomenon: the YouTube war." The New York Times states that online videos have "allowed a widening war to be documented like no other."

Prominent videos include the rebel commander Abu Sakkar cutting organs from the dead body of a Syrian soldier and putting one of them in his mouth, "as if he is taking a bite out of it". He called rebels to follow his example and terrorize the Alawite sect, which mostly backs Assad.

== Propaganda ==
Since the start of the war, all sides have used the media to try to discredit their opponents and show them in their worst possible light. On the other hand, not all situations have been shown in the worst possible light.

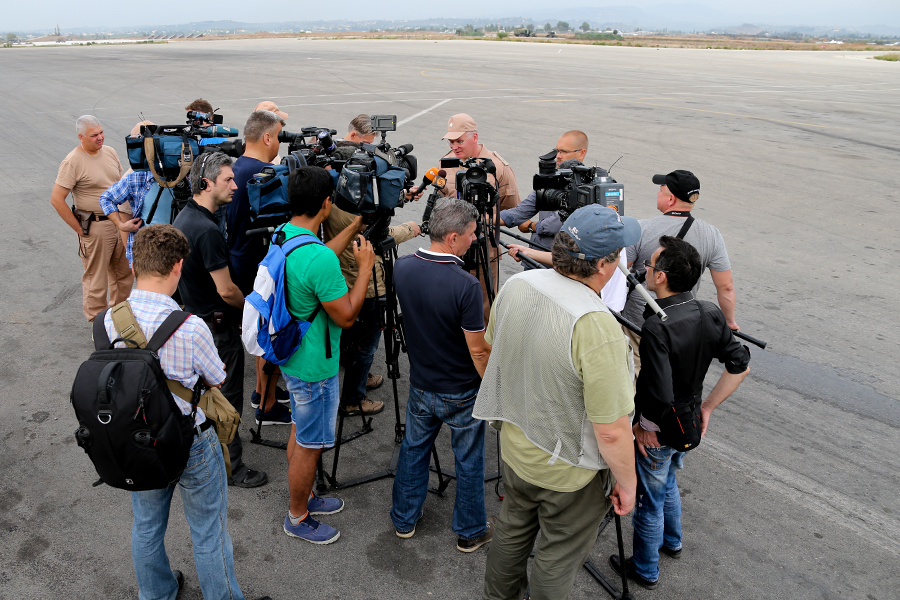
Journalists interviewing Russian General Igor Konashenkov (ru:И́горь Конаше́нков) at Latakia International Airport during the Russian military intervention in the Syrian Civil War

Syria is ranked the third most repressive country in the world in terms of press freedom by the Committee to Protect Journalists, and the 4th most repressive by Reporters Without Borders. Propaganda has been used by the Syrian government since the beginning of the conflict. Ba'athist government's propaganda outlet SANA has repeatedly characterized Syrian opposition groups as "armed terrorist gangs". Former employees have said that Syrian Arab News Agency (SANA)'s role was to "fabricate, make deceptions and cover up for Bashar al-Assad's crimes" and that television interviews sometimes use government supporters 'disguised as locals' who stand near sites of destruction and claim that they were caused by rebel fighters.

Al-Jazeera has also been accused of biased coverage. The Lebanese newspaper As-Safir cited outtakes of interviews showing that the channel's staff coached Syrian eyewitnesses and fabricated reports of oppression by Syria's government. It refers to leaked internal e-mails suggest that Al Jazeera has become subordinated to the Qatari emir's assertive foreign policy, which supports Syria's rebels and advocates military intervention in the country. Al Jazeera reportedly put pressure on its journalists to use the term "martyr" for slain Syrian rebels, but not pro-government forces. In January 2013, a former news editor at Al Jazeera, who was from Syria, and had been at Al Jazeera for "nearly a decade" was fired without cause given, but in an interview stated their belief that it was linked to his/her resistance of ongoing strong pressure to conform to biased coverage of the Syrian civil war. The former editor stated that the Muslim Brotherhood was "controlling the Syrian file at Al-Jazeera" with both organizations biasing news coverage in favour of the Brotherhood ousting the Syrian government of Assad by force and warning the then-editor "the majority [in Syria] is with the Muslim Brotherhood and [taking power] is within our grasp" so "thank your god if you get a pardon when we become the government." The source named the names of several other former employees who resigned in protest, including director of the Berlin bureau Aktham Sleiman, a Syrian, "who was, at the beginning, with the [Syrian] opposition" but resisted what the interviewee terms the "lies and despicable [political and ethnic] sectarianism" and concluded that "Al-Jazeera has lied and is still lying" about Syria and in favour of armed overthrow and of the Muslim Brotherhood. In 2016, it was revealed through emails of Hillary Clinton that Google and Al-Jazeera planned to encourage defections from the Syrian government, through various internet tools that disseminate information.

=== Hoaxes ===
Both sides have been distributing on social media videos and photos of violence, while falsely claiming that the atrocities had been committed by the opposition: later it turned out to be footage from conflicts in other countries.

Examples:

- A Gay Girl In Damascus, a 2011 blog written by an American posing as a gay girl in Damascus.
- "Syrian Hero Boy", a 2015 viral video showing a Syrian boy rescuing a girl under gunfire, watched online by millions of viewers, was faked by a Norwegian film crew, according to its director. Posted on YouTube, the "Syrian Hero Boy" video was shot on location in Malta in the summer of 2014 with professional actors, directed by 34-year-old Norwegian Lars Klevberg, who hoped to provoke debates about media distortion and context children in war zones.
- In 2011, the 18-year-old Zainab Alhusni was claimed to have been taken in Syrian custody and later killed and mutilated, due to her brother being an activist. Her family held a funeral, but she later turned out to be alive, and had run away from home because her brothers beat her.

== Attacks on journalists ==
It has been maintained that, by October 2012, 'more than hundred professional or citizen journalists' had reportedly been killed in the Syrian Civil War. According to the Committee to Protect Journalists, 13 journalists were killed in work-related incidents during the first eighteen months of the uprising. During the same period, Reporters Without Borders said a total of 33 journalists were killed. The Sunday Times contributor Marie Colvin was killed by an explosion during the battle of Homs, but at least one, French journalist Gilles Jacquier, was killed by rebel mortar fire.

Except for those selected by the Syrian government, journalists have been banned from reporting in Syria. Those who have entered the country regardless have been targeted. Within a month of the protests taking off, at least seven local and international journalists were detained, and at least one of them was beaten. 'Citizen journalist' Mohammed Abdelmawla al-Hariri was arrested in April 2012, tortured in prison, and sentenced to death in May 2012 for giving an interview for Al Jazeera. Jordanian Salameh Kaileh was tortured and detained in deplorable conditions before being deported.

=== NBC News team kidnapping ===
On 13 December 2012, NBC News reporter Richard Engel and his five crew members, Aziz Akyavaş, Ghazi Balkiz, John Kooistra, Ian Rivers and Ammar Cheikh Omar, were abducted in Syria. Having escaped after five days in captivity, Engel said he believed that a Shabiha group loyal to al-Assad was behind the abduction, and that the crew was freed by the Ahrar ash-Sham group five days later. Engel's account was however challenged from early on. In April 2015, NBC had to revise the kidnapping account, following further investigations by The New York Times, which suggested that the NBC team "was almost certainly taken by a Sunni criminal element affiliated with the Free Syrian Army," rather than by a loyalist Shia group.

== See also ==
- Media of Syria
