= Mende Nazer =

Sudanese author and human rights activist

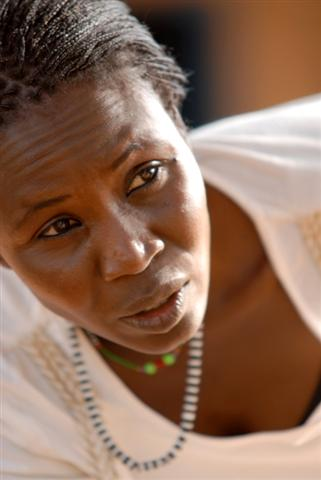
- Nazer in 2006
- Born: c. 1982 (aged c. 42); Sudan

Mende Nazer (born c. 1982) is a UK-resident, Sudanese author and human rights activist. Nazer was a slave in Sudan and in London for eight years. She later co-wrote the 2002 book Slave: My True Story.

== Abduction ==
Nazer is a Nuba woman from a village in the Nuba Mountains of southern Sudan. According to her own account, at the age of twelve or thirteen (her birthdate is unknown), she was abducted and sold into slavery in Sudan following a slaving raid on her village. Although her family fled the raiders into the mountains, she became separated from her family and was caught by one of the raiders. For six years, Nazer served a family in Khartoum, where she was forced into hard labour and was subjected to physical abuse.

== Escape and asylum claim ==
Six years into her captivity, Nazer was sent to London to be a household servant to a Sudanese diplomat, Abdel al-Koronky, acting chargé d'affaires at Sudan's embassy, who resided in Willesden Green. After three months, and with the help of a fellow Sudanese, she managed to escape. She claimed asylum. At first, the Home Office denied her claim, two years after it was submitted. This provoked the rise of a movement in support of her, consisting of individuals and human rights groups, including Anti-Slavery International.

By the time of the denial, she had already had her autobiography published in Germany, coauthored by a British professional journalist. The Home Office reversed its denial in November 2002, and granted her political asylum. The decision stated: "In view of the widespread publication of her book and the high profile given to her claims both in Sudan and elsewhere, I am satisfied that Ms. Nazer would face difficulties which would bring her within the scope of the 1951 convention were she to be returned to Sudan. For these reasons it has been decided to recognise her as a refugee and grant her Indefinite Leave to Remain in the United Kingdom."

In 2005, the English-language edition of her autobiography was published. In 2010, her life story was dramatised in the Channel Four film I Am Slave, starring Wunmi Mosaku. In the same year, on 23 November, it was the subject of a stage play entitled Slave — A Question of Freedom, by Feelgood Theatre Productions, featuring British actress Lashana Lynch on the role of Mende. The theatre company reprised the production in 2011, with British actress Ebony Feare taking the lead role. She had played the role of Mende's friend Keko in the original stage performance.

== Daily Telegraph libel lawsuit ==
After the Sunday Telegraph printed a second-hand account of her version of her experience as a slave in September 2000, al-Koronky sued the paper for libel. In July 2002, before the case went to trial, the paper retracted its story and agreed to pay damages. Nazer and the coauthor of her autobiography, which was published in 2003, have blamed this outcome on the Telegraph reporter's professional incompetence. In particular, the reporter never met with or even spoke to Mende prior to publication of the article. As part of the case settlement, the Telegraph retracted the entire story. Nazer later wrote that she should have been given the opportunity to clarify the story's inaccuracies and point out the truths it contained.

== See also ==
- Francis Bok
- Slavery in Sudan
- List of slaves
